= List of least concern birds =

- Extinct in the wild (EW): 5 species
- Critically endangered (CR): 216 species
- Endangered (EN): 372 species
- Vulnerable (VU): 670 species
- Near threatened (NT): 967 species
- Least concern (LC): 8,767 species
- Data deficient (DD): 37 species
Avian species (IUCN, 2025-2)
- 11,198 extant species have been evaluated
- 11,161 of those are fully assessed (Note: excludes data deficient evaluations.)
- 9,734 are not threatened at present (Note: NT and LC.)
- 1,427 to 1,464 are threatened (Note: Threatened comprises CR, EN and VU. Upper estimate additionally includes DD.)
- 169 to 187 are extinct or extinct in the wild:
  - 164 extinct (EX) species (Note: Chart omits extinct (EX) species)
  - 5 extinct in the wild (EW)
  - 18 possibly extinct [CR(PE)]

In December 2019, the International Union for Conservation of Nature (IUCN) listed 8460 least concern avian species. Of all evaluated avian species, 76.9% are listed as least concern. No subpopulations of birds have been evaluated by the IUCN.

This is a complete list of least concern avian species evaluated by the IUCN. Where possible common names for taxa are given while links point to the scientific name used by the IUCN.

== Struthioniformes ==
Ostriches

- Ostrich

== Rheiformes ==
Rheas

- Darwin's rhea

== Casuariiformes ==
Emu and cassowaries

- Dwarf cassowary
- Southern cassowary
- Northern cassowary
- Emu

== Tinamiformes ==
Tinamous

- Black-capped tinamou
- Bartlett's tinamou
- Berlepsch's tinamou
- Rusty tinamou
- Barred tinamou
- Cinereous tinamou
- Thicket tinamou
- Grey-capped tinamou
- Red-legged tinamou
- Brown tinamou
- Western thicket tinamou
- Small-billed tinamou
- Tepui tinamou
- Little tinamou
- Brazilian tinamou
- Tataupa tinamou
- Undulated tinamou
- Variegated tinamou
- Elegant crested tinamou
- Quebracho crested tinamou
- Highland tinamou
- Tawny-breasted tinamou
- Hooded tinamou
- Brushland tinamou
- Curve-billed tinamou
- Ornate tinamou
- Andean tinamou
- Chilean tinamou
- White-bellied nothura
- Chaco nothura
- Darwin's nothura
- Spotted nothura
- Huayco tinamou
- Red-winged tinamou
- Patagonian tinamou
- Puna tinamou

== Anseriformes ==
Ducks, geese, swans, screamers

=== Anhimidae ===
Screamers

- Northern screamer
- Horned screamer
- Southern screamer

=== Anseranatidae ===
Magpie goose (monotypic)

- Magpie goose

=== Anatidae ===
Ducks, geese, and swans

- Mandarin duck
- Wood duck
- Egyptian goose
- Brazilian teal
- Northern pintail
- Andean teal
- White-cheeked pintail
- Cape teal
- Chestnut teal
- Eurasian teal
- Eaton's pintail
- Red-billed teal
- Yellow-billed teal
- Mottled duck
- Yellow-billed pintail
- Sunda teal
- Grey teal
- Philippine duck
- Mallard
- Spot-billed duck
- American black duck
- African black duck
- Pacific black duck
- Yellow-billed duck
- Eastern spot-billed duck
- Greater white-fronted goose
- Greylag goose
- Pink-footed goose
- Snow goose
- Emperor goose
- Taiga bean goose
- Bar-headed goose
- Ross's goose
- Lesser scaup
- Redhead
- Hardhead
- Ring-necked duck
- Tufted duck
- Greater scaup
- New Zealand scaup
- Canvasback
- Musk duck
- Brant goose
- Canada goose
- Cackling goose
- Barnacle goose
- Bufflehead
- Common goldeneye
- Barrow's goldeneye
- Muscovy duck
- Ringed teal
- Cape Barren goose
- Australian wood duck
- Kelp goose
- Andean goose
- Upland goose
- Ashy-headed goose
- Ruddy-headed goose
- Coscoroba swan
- Black swan
- Trumpeter swan
- Tundra swan
- Whooper swan
- Black-necked swan
- Mute swan
- Wandering whistling duck
- Black-bellied whistling duck
- Fulvous whistling duck
- Plumed whistling duck
- Spotted whistling duck
- Lesser whistling duck
- White-faced whistling duck
- Black-headed duck
- Harlequin duck
- Hooded merganser
- Crested duck
- Pink-eared duck
- American wigeon
- Falcated duck
- Eurasian wigeon
- Chiloé wigeon
- Gadwall
- White-winged scoter
- Common scoter
- Surf scoter
- Stejneger's scoter
- Torrent duck
- Smew
- Common merganser
- Red-breasted merganser
- Orinoco goose
- Southern pochard
- Rosy-billed pochard
- Red-crested pochard
- African pygmy goose
- Cotton pygmy goose
- Green pygmy goose
- Masked duck
- Blue-billed duck
- Andean duck
- Ruddy duck
- Lake duck
- Spur-winged goose
- Hartlaub's duck
- Radjah shelduck
- Salvadori's teal
- Knob-billed duck
- Comb duck
- Baikal teal
- Spectacled eider
- King eider
- Northern shoveler
- Cinnamon teal
- Blue-winged teal
- Blue-billed teal
- Red shoveler
- Puna teal
- Garganey
- Australasian shoveler
- Cape shoveler
- Silver teal
- Freckled duck
- Falkland steamer duck
- Flying steamer duck
- Fuegian steamer duck
- South African shelduck
- Ruddy shelduck
- Common shelduck
- Australian shelduck
- Paradise shelduck
- White-backed duck

== Galliformes ==
Landfowl

=== Megapodiidae ===
Megapodes

- Wattled brushturkey
- Australian brushturkey
- Philippine megapode
- New Guinea scrubfowl
- Melanesian megapode
- Dusky megapode
- Vanuatu megapode
- Orange-footed scrubfowl
- Red-billed brushturkey
- Black-billed brushturkey
- Collared brushturkey

=== Cracidae ===
Chachalacas, currassows, and guans

- Wattled guan
- Sickle-winged guan
- Black curassow
- Salvin's curassow
- Crestless curassow
- Razor-billed curassow
- Nocturnal curassow
- East Brazilian chachalaca
- Chaco chachalaca
- Grey-headed chachalaca
- Colombian chachalaca
- Chestnut-winged chachalaca
- Speckled chachalaca
- White-bellied chachalaca
- Little chachalaca
- West Mexican chachalaca
- Rufous-vented chachalaca
- Scaled chachalaca
- Buff-browed chachalaca
- Plain chachalaca
- Rufous-bellied chachalaca
- Band-tailed guan
- Red-faced guan
- Spix's guan
- Marail guan
- Andean guan
- Dusky-legged guan
- Crested guan
- Rusty-margined guan
- Red-throated piping guan
- Blue-throated piping guan

=== Guineafowl ===
Guineafowl

- Vulturine guineafowl
- Black guineafowl
- Southern crested guineafowl
- Plumed guineafowl
- Crested guineafowl
- Western crested guineafowl
- Helmeted guineafowl

=== Odontophoridae ===
New World quail

- California quail
- Elegant quail
- Gambel's quail
- Scaled quail
- Crested bobwhite
- Spot-bellied bobwhite
- Yucatan bobwhite
- Montezuma quail
- Singing quail
- Buffy-crowned wood partridge
- Long-tailed wood partridge
- Black-fronted wood quail
- Stripe-faced wood quail
- Spot-winged wood quail
- Tacarcuna wood quail
- Rufous-fronted wood quail
- Marbled wood quail
- Spotted wood quail
- Chestnut wood quail
- Black-breasted wood quail
- Dark-backed wood quail
- Black-eared wood quail
- Starred wood quail
- Mountain quail
- Banded quail
- Stone partridge
- Tawny-faced quail

=== Phasianidae ===
Pheasants and allies

- Barbary partridge
- Chukar partridge
- Przevalski's partridge
- Arabian partridge
- Philby's partridge
- See-see partridge
- Sand partridge
- Snow Mountain quail
- White-cheeked partridge
- Bar-backed partridge
- Chestnut-headed partridge
- Malaysian partridge
- Green-legged partridge
- Taiwan partridge
- Red-breasted partridge
- Chestnut-bellied partridge
- Roll's partridge
- Red-billed partridge
- Rufous-throated partridge
- Sumatran partridge
- Tonkin partridge
- Hill partridge
- Mountain bamboo partridge
- Taiwan bamboo partridge
- Chinese bamboo partridge
- Hazel grouse
- Ruffed grouse
- Lady Amherst's pheasant
- Golden pheasant
- Rain quail
- Common quail
- Harlequin quail
- Stubble quail
- Blue eared pheasant
- White eared pheasant
- Tibetan eared pheasant
- Brown eared pheasant
- Sooty grouse
- Dusky grouse
- Crested francolin
- Spruce grouse
- Siberian grouse
- Franklin's grouse
- Black francolin
- Painted francolin
- Chinese francolin
- Grey francolin
- Sri Lanka spurfowl
- Painted spurfowl
- Red spurfowl
- Red junglefowl
- Sri Lankan junglefowl
- Grey junglefowl
- Green junglefowl
- Crimson-headed partridge
- Blood pheasant
- Willow ptarmigan
- White-tailed ptarmigan
- Rock ptarmigan
- Snow partridge
- Himalayan monal
- Sclater's monal
- Siamese fireback
- Kalij pheasant
- Silver pheasant
- Black grouse
- Madagascan partridge
- Wild turkey
- Indian peafowl
- White-throated francolin
- Coqui francolin
- Latham's francolin
- Schlegel's francolin
- Rock bush quail
- Jungle bush quail
- Painted bush quail
- Daurian partridge
- Tibetan partridge
- Grey partridge
- Common pheasant
- Green pheasant
- Grey peacock-pheasant
- Bronze-tailed peacock-pheasant
- Red-billed spurfowl
- Red-necked spurfowl
- Ahanta francolin
- Black-fronted francolin
- Double-spurred francolin
- Cape spurfowl
- Chestnut-naped francolin
- Clapperton's francolin
- Erckel's francolin
- Grey-striped francolin
- Hartlaub's spurfowl
- Hildebrandt's francolin
- Heuglin's francolin
- Jackson's francolin
- Yellow-necked spurfowl
- Natal spurfowl
- Handsome francolin
- Grey-breasted spurfowl
- Scaly francolin
- Swainson's spurfowl
- Koklass pheasant
- Grey-winged francolin
- Elgon francolin
- Finsch's francolin
- Orange River francolin
- Red-winged francolin
- Moorland francolin
- Shelley's francolin
- Ring-necked francolin
- Whyte's francolin
- Blue quail
- King quail
- Brown quail
- Elliot's pheasant
- Mikado pheasant
- Copper pheasant
- Black-billed capercaillie
- Western capercaillie
- Altai snowcock
- Caspian snowcock
- Caucasian snowcock
- Himalayan snowcock
- Tibetan snowcock
- Verreaux's monal-partridge
- Szechenyi's monal-partridge
- Satyr tragopan
- Temminck's tragopan
- Sharp-tailed grouse

== Caprimulgiformes ==
Nightjars

- Mexican whip-poor-will
- Yucatan nightjar
- Cuban nightjar
- Hispaniolan nightjar
- Buff-collared nightjar
- Rufous nightjar
- Tawny-collared nightjar
- Dusky nightjar
- Silky-tailed nightjar
- Egyptian nightjar
- Savanna nightjar
- Andaman nightjar
- Indian nightjar
- Jerdon's nightjar
- Bates's nightjar
- Sulawesi nightjar
- Slender-tailed nightjar
- Long-tailed nightjar
- Donaldson Smith's nightjar
- European nightjar
- Golden nightjar
- Square-tailed nightjar
- Sombre nightjar
- Jungle nightjar
- Plain nightjar
- Grey nightjar
- Standard-winged nightjar
- Large-tailed nightjar
- Madagascan nightjar
- Sykes's nightjar
- Philippine nightjar
- Mees's nightjar
- Swamp nightjar
- Nubian nightjar
- Fiery-necked nightjar
- Palau nightjar
- Montane nightjar
- Salvadori's nightjar
- Red-necked nightjar
- Rufous-cheeked nightjar
- Star-spotted nightjar
- Freckled nightjar
- Pennant-winged nightjar
- Lesser nighthawk
- Antillean nighthawk
- Common nighthawk
- Nacunda nighthawk
- Least nighthawk
- Sand-coloured nighthawk
- Archbold's nightjar
- Spotted nightjar
- Satanic nightjar
- White-throated nightjar
- Papuan nightjar
- Collared nightjar
- White-tailed nightjar
- Ladder-tailed nightjar
- Spot-tailed nightjar
- Scissor-tailed nightjar
- Rufous-bellied nighthawk
- Short-tailed nighthawk
- Great eared nightjar
- Malaysian eared nightjar
- Long-trained nightjar
- Pauraque
- Anthony's nightjar
- Eared poorwill
- Ocellated poorwill
- Chocó poorwill
- Yucatan poorwill
- Pygmy nightjar
- Blackish nightjar
- Band-tailed nighthawk
- Plain-tailed nighthawk
- Common poorwill
- Todd's nightjar
- Little nightjar
- Roraiman nightjar
- Lesser band-winged nightjar
- Band-winged nightjar
- Tepui nightjar
- Lyre-tailed nightjar
- Swallow-tailed nightjar
- Brown nightjar

== Steatornithiformes ==
Oilbird (monotypic)

- Oilbird

== Nyctibiiformes ==
Potoos

- Long-tailed potoo
- Rufous potoo
- Great potoo
- Common potoo
- Northern potoo
- White-winged potoo
- Andean potoo

== Podargiformes ==
Frogmouths

- Sunda frogmouth
- Dulit frogmouth
- Hodgson's frogmouth
- Javan frogmouth
- Bornean frogmouth
- Sri Lanka frogmouth
- Sumatran frogmouth
- Philippine frogmouth
- Marbled frogmouth
- Papuan frogmouth
- Tawny frogmouth

== Aegotheliformes ==
Owlet-nightjars

- Mountain owlet-nightjar
- Archbold's owlet-nightjar
- Barred owlet-nightjar
- Moluccan owlet-nightjar
- Australian owlet-nightjar
- Feline owlet-nightjar

== Apodiformes ==
Hummingbirds and swifts

=== Hemiprocnidae ===
Treeswifts

- Whiskered treeswift
- Crested treeswift
- Grey-rumped treeswift
- Moustached treeswift

=== Apodidae ===
Swifts

- Himalayan swiftlet
- Edible-nest swiftlet
- Mountain swiftlet
- Halmahera swiftlet
- Island swiftlet
- Tahiti swiftlet
- Black-nest swiftlet
- Philippine swiftlet
- Bare-legged swiftlet
- Palau swiftlet
- Mossy-nest swiftlet
- White-rumped swiftlet
- Australian swiftlet
- Indian swiftlet
- Uniform swiftlet
- Volcano swiftlet
- Andean swift
- White-tipped swift
- White-throated swift
- Little swift
- Cape Verde swift
- Common swift
- Malagasy black swift
- African black swift
- Bates's swift
- Forbes-Watson's swift
- Bradfield's swift
- White-rumped swift
- Horus swift
- Nyanza swift
- House swift
- Pacific swift
- Pallid swift
- Plain swift
- Short-tailed swift
- Chapman's swift
- Grey-rumped swift
- Pale-rumped swift
- Costa Rican swift
- Lesser Antillean swift
- Sick's swift
- Band-rumped swift
- Vaux's swift
- Glossy swiftlet
- Cave swiftlet
- Pygmy swiftlet
- White-chinned swift
- Sooty swift
- White-chested swift
- American black swift
- Rothschild's swift
- Great dusky swift
- Asian palm swift
- African palm swift
- White-throated needletail
- Purple needletail
- Silver-backed needletail
- Brown-backed needletail
- Giant swiftlet
- Papuan spine-tailed swift
- Böhm's spinetail
- Cassin's spinetail
- Lesser swallow-tailed swift
- Great swallow-tailed swift
- Silver-rumped spinetail
- Sabine's spinetail
- Scarce swift
- Biscutate swift
- Tepui swift
- Chestnut-collared swift
- White-naped swift
- White-collared swift
- Pygmy palm swift
- Antillean palm swift
- Neotropical palm swift
- Mottled swift
- Alpine swift
- Black spinetail
- Mottled spinetail
- Madagascan spinetail
- White-rumped spinetail
- São Tomé spinetail

=== Trochilidae ===
Hummingbirds

- Emerald-chinned hummingbird
- Speckled hummingbird
- Shining sunbeam
- Black-hooded sunbeam
- Violet-tailed sylph
- Long-tailed sylph
- Andean emerald
- Cinnamon hummingbird
- Rufous-tailed hummingbird
- Buff-bellied hummingbird
- Amazilia hummingbird
- Tooth-billed hummingbird
- Broad-tipped hermit
- Puerto Rican mango
- Antillean mango
- Jamaican mango
- Black-throated mango
- Green-breasted mango
- Veraguan mango
- Green-throated mango
- Green mango
- Sombre hummingbird
- Black-chinned hummingbird
- Ruby-throated hummingbird
- Wine-throated hummingbird
- Bumblebee hummingbird
- Fiery-tailed awlbill
- White-eared hummingbird
- Xantus's hummingbird
- Buff-tailed coronet
- Velvet-purple coronet
- Chestnut-breasted coronet
- Amethyst woodstar
- Magenta-throated woodstar
- Bahama woodstar
- Purple-throated woodstar
- Lucifer sheartail
- Beautiful sheartail
- Anna's hummingbird
- Costa's hummingbird
- Wedge-tailed sabrewing
- Scaly-breasted hummingbird
- Buff-breasted sabrewing
- Lazuline sabrewing
- Violet sabrewing
- Rufous-breasted sabrewing
- Grey-breasted sabrewing
- Rufous sabrewing
- Napo sabrewing
- Santa Marta woodstar
- Gorgeted woodstar
- Rufous-shafted woodstar
- White-bellied woodstar
- Rainbow-bearded thornbill
- Bronze-tailed thornbill
- Olivaceous thornbill
- Rufous-capped thornbill
- Blue-mantled thornbill
- White-vented plumeleteer
- Bronze-tailed plumeleteer
- Spot-vented emerald (Treated as subspecies of Sapphire-spangled emerald under IOC taxonomy)
- Glittering-throated emerald
- Sapphire-spangled emerald
- White-bellied emerald
- Garden emerald
- Golden-crowned emerald
- Canivet's emerald
- Cozumel emerald
- Red-billed emerald
- Glittering-bellied emerald
- Puerto Rican emerald
- Blue-tailed emerald
- Blue-chinned sapphire
- Chiribiquete emerald
- Short-tailed emerald
- Cuban emerald
- Coppery emerald
- Narrow-tailed emerald
- Hispaniolan emerald
- Ruby-topaz hummingbird
- White-chested emerald
- Blue-headed sapphire
- Humboldt's sapphire
- Plain-bellied emerald
- Golden-tailed sapphire
- Versicoloured emerald
- Brazilian ruby
- Apurimac starfrontlet (Treated as subspecies of Violet-throated starfrontlet under IOC taxonomy)
- Golden-bellied starfrontlet
- Bronzy inca
- Green inca
- Huanuco starfrontlet (Treated as subspecies of Violet-throated starfrontlet under IOC taxonomy)
- Vilcabamba inca (Treated as subspecies of Collared inca under IOC taxonomy)
- Golden-tailed starfrontlet
- Blue-throated starfrontlet
- Gould's inca
- Rainbow starfrontlet
- Buff-winged starfrontlet
- Cuzco starfrontlet (Treated as subspecies of Violet-throated starfrontlet under IOC taxonomy)
- White-tailed starfrontlet
- Collared inca
- Violet-throated starfrontlet
- Brown inca
- Sparkling violetear
- Brown violetear
- White-vented violetear
- Green violetear
- Blue-headed hummingbird
- Turquoise-crowned hummingbird
- Broad-billed hummingbird
- Dusky hummingbird
- Green thorntail
- Black-bellied thorntail
- Racket-tailed coquette
- Wire-crested thorntail
- Slender sheartail
- Blue-fronted lancebill
- Green-fronted lancebill
- White-bellied hummingbird
- Green-and-white hummingbird
- White-tailed emerald
- Coppery-headed emerald
- Sword-billed hummingbird
- Emerald-bellied puffleg
- Coppery-bellied puffleg
- Black-thighed puffleg
- Blue-capped puffleg
- Sapphire-vented puffleg
- Golden-breasted puffleg
- Coppery-naped puffleg
- Glowing puffleg
- Magnificent hummingbird
- Green-throated carib
- Purple-throated carib
- Swallow-tailed hummingbird
- Stripe-tailed hummingbird
- Black-bellied hummingbird
- White-tipped sicklebill
- Buff-tailed sicklebill
- Black jacobin
- White-necked jacobin
- Bronzy hermit
- Rufous-breasted hermit
- Violet-capped hummingbird
- Buff-thighed puffleg
- Greenish puffleg
- Horned sungem
- Amethyst-throated sunangel
- Longuemare's sunangel
- Tourmaline sunangel
- Orange-throated sunangel
- Flame-throated sunangel
- Mérida sunangel
- Gorgeted sunangel
- Purple-throated sunangel
- Gould's jewelfront
- Rufous-webbed brilliant
- Pink-throated brilliant
- Empress brilliant
- Green-crowned brilliant
- Violet-fronted brilliant
- Fawn-breasted brilliant
- Black-throated brilliant
- Black-breasted brilliant (Treated as subspecies of Black-throated brilliant under IOC taxonomy)
- Velvet-browed brilliant
- Plain-capped starthroat
- Blue-tufted starthroat
- Long-billed starthroat
- Stripe-breasted starthroat
- Black-eared fairy
- Purple-crowned fairy
- Gilded sapphire
- White-chinned sapphire
- Blue-throated sapphire
- Rufous-throated sapphire
- Violet-bellied hummingbird
- Violet-headed hummingbird
- Mountain velvetbreast
- Amethyst-throated mountaingem
- Purple-throated mountaingem
- White-throated mountaingem
- Grey-tailed mountaingem
- Blue-throated mountaingem
- White-bellied mountaingem
- Green-breasted mountaingem
- Green-throated mountaingem
- Garnet-throated hummingbird
- Sapphire-throated hummingbird
- Shining-green hummingbird
- Green-tailed trainbearer
- Black-tailed trainbearer
- Tumbes hummingbird
- Olive-spotted hummingbird
- Buffy hummingbird
- Spot-throated hummingbird
- White-throated hummingbird
- Violet-crowned hummingbird
- Green-fronted hummingbird
- Cinnamon-sided hummingbird
- White-crested coquette
- Festive coquette
- Rufous-crested coquette
- Black-crested coquette
- Frilled coquette
- Tufted coquette
- Peacock coquette
- Spangled coquette
- Butterfly coquette
- Vervain hummingbird
- Scaled metaltail
- Fiery-throated metaltail
- Neblina metaltail
- Black metaltail
- Coppery metaltail
- Tyrian metaltail
- Viridian metaltail
- Snowcap
- Slender-tailed woodstar
- Short-tailed woodstar
- Purple-collared woodstar
- Booted racket-tail
- Mountain avocetbill
- Western mountaineer (Treated as subspecies of Bearded mountaineer under IOC taxonomy)
- Bearded mountaineer
- Wedge-tailed hillstar
- Ecuadorian hillstar
- Andean hillstar
- White-sided hillstar
- Black-breasted hillstar
- Green-headed hillstar
- Antillean crested hummingbird
- Green-bearded helmetcrest
- White-bearded helmetcrest
- Fiery-throated hummingbird
- Giant hummingbird
- Pale-bellied hermit
- Black-throated hermit
- Sooty-capped hermit
- Ecuadorian hermit (Treated as subspecies of Long-billed hermit under IOC taxonomy)
- Straight-billed hermit
- Scale-throated hermit
- Grey-chinned hermit
- Green hermit
- White-bearded hermit
- Minute hermit
- Koepcke's hermit
- Long-billed hermit
- Little hermit
- Great-billed hermit
- Mexican hermit
- Cinnamon-throated hermit
- Needle-billed hermit
- Porculla hermit (Treated as subspecies of Grey-chinned hermit under IOC taxonomy)
- Planalto hermit
- Reddish hermit
- Streak-throated hermit
- Dusky-throated hermit
- Stripe-throated hermit
- White-browed hermit
- Buff-bellied hermit
- Long-tailed hermit
- Tawny-bellied hermit
- White-whiskered hermit
- Peruvian piedtail
- Ecuadorian piedtail
- Blue-chested hummingbird
- Charming hummingbird
- Purple-chested hummingbird
- Bronze-tailed comet
- White-tailed goldenthroat
- Tepui goldenthroat
- Green-tailed goldenthroat
- Great sapphirewing
- Saw-billed hermit
- Purple-backed thornbill
- Oasis hummingbird
- Red-tailed comet
- Berylline hummingbird
- Copper-tailed hummingbird
- Indigo-capped hummingbird
- Azure-crowned hummingbird
- Blue-tailed hummingbird
- Snowy-bellied hummingbird
- Steely-vented hummingbird
- Copper-rumped hummingbird
- Green-bellied hummingbird
- Western wedge-billed hummingbird
- Wedge-billed hummingbird
- Calliope hummingbird
- Volcano hummingbird
- Broad-tailed hummingbird
- Rufous hummingbird
- Allen's hummingbird
- Scintillant hummingbird
- Green-backed firecrown
- Green-crowned plovercrest
- Purple-crowned plovercrest
- Violet-chested hummingbird
- Many-spotted hummingbird
- Crowned woodnymph
- Fork-tailed woodnymph
- Violet-capped woodnymph
- Peruvian sheartail
- Pale-tailed barbthroat
- Sooty barbthroat
- Band-tailed barbthroat
- Sparkling-tailed woodstar
- Crimson topaz
- Fiery topaz
- Red-billed streamertail
- Black-billed streamertail
- White-tailed hillstar
- Green-backed hillstar
- Purple-bibbed whitetip
- Rufous-vented whitetip

== Musophagiformes ==
Turacos

- Great blue turaco
- Grey go-away-bird
- Black-faced go-away-bird
- Bare-faced go-away-bird
- Western plantain-eater
- Eastern plantain-eater
- White-bellied go-away-bird
- Ruwenzori turaco
- Purple-crested turaco
- Ross's turaco
- Violet turaco
- Knysna turaco
- Red-crested turaco
- Hartlaub's turaco
- White-crested turaco
- White-cheeked turaco
- Livingstone's turaco
- Yellow-billed turaco
- Guinea turaco
- Schalow's turaco
- Black-billed turaco

== Otidiformes ==
Bustards

- Northern black korhaan
- Australian bustard
- White-bellied bustard
- Rüppell's korhaan
- Karoo korhaan
- Hartlaub's bustard
- Black-bellied bustard
- Buff-crested bustard
- Red-crested korhaan
- Savile's bustard
- Heuglin's bustard

== Cuculiformes ==
Cuckoos

- Chestnut-breasted cuckoo
- Fan-tailed cuckoo
- Plaintive cuckoo
- Grey-bellied cuckoo
- Banded bay cuckoo
- Brush cuckoo
- White-crowned cuckoo
- Coral-billed ground cuckoo
- Andaman coucal
- Gabon coucal
- White-necked coucal
- Lesser coucal
- Black-billed coucal
- Bay coucal
- Coppery-tailed coucal
- Goliath coucal
- Black coucal
- Black-throated coucal
- Black-faced coucal
- Ivory-billed coucal
- Buff-headed coucal
- Blue-headed coucal
- Pheasant coucal
- Senegal coucal
- Greater coucal
- Kai coucal
- White-browed coucal
- Malagasy coucal
- Rufous coucal
- Violaceous coucal
- Philippine coucal
- Dusky long-tailed cuckoo
- Barred long-tailed cuckoo
- Olive long-tailed cuckoo
- Yellowbill
- Whistling yellowbill
- Horsfield's bronze cuckoo
- Pied bronze cuckoo
- Shining bronze cuckoo
- Long-billed cuckoo
- White-eared bronze cuckoo
- Little bronze cuckoo
- Black-eared cuckoo
- Rufous-throated bronze cuckoo
- Diederik cuckoo
- African emerald cuckoo
- Yellow-throated cuckoo
- Klaas's cuckoo
- Asian emerald cuckoo
- Violet cuckoo
- Chestnut-winged cuckoo
- Great spotted cuckoo
- Jacobin cuckoo
- Levaillant's cuckoo
- Ash-colored cuckoo
- Little cuckoo
- Dwarf cuckoo
- Yellow-billed cuckoo
- Black-billed cuckoo
- Pearly-breasted cuckoo
- Grey-capped cuckoo
- Hispaniolan lizard cuckoo
- Dark-billed cuckoo
- Great lizard cuckoo
- Mangrove cuckoo
- Chestnut-bellied cuckoo
- Jamaican lizard cuckoo
- Puerto Rican lizard cuckoo
- Blue coua
- Coquerel's coua
- Crested coua
- Running coua
- Olive-capped coua
- Red-fronted coua
- Red-capped coua
- Red-breasted coua
- Smooth-billed ani
- Greater ani
- Groove-billed ani
- Common cuckoo
- Black cuckoo
- Sulawesi cuckoo
- African cuckoo
- Sunda cuckoo
- Indian cuckoo
- Lesser cuckoo
- Madagascan cuckoo
- Himalayan cuckoo
- Red-chested cuckoo
- Rough-crested malkoha
- Pavonine cuckoo
- Pheasant cuckoo
- Pacific koel
- Asian koel
- Greater roadrunner
- Lesser roadrunner
- Guira cuckoo
- Pallid cuckoo
- Dark hawk-cuckoo
- Malay hawk-cuckoo
- Northern hawk-cuckoo
- Hodgson's hawk-cuckoo
- Philippine hawk-cuckoo
- Large hawk-cuckoo
- Common hawk-cuckoo
- Scale-feathered malkoha
- Dwarf koel
- Lesser ground cuckoo
- Red-billed ground cuckoo
- Rufous-winged ground cuckoo
- Thick-billed cuckoo
- Chestnut-breasted malkoha
- Mentawai malkoha
- Green-billed malkoha
- Blue-faced malkoha
- Squirrel cuckoo
- Black-bellied cuckoo
- Mexican squirrel-cuckoo
- Yellow-billed malkoha
- Raffles's malkoha
- Channel-billed cuckoo
- Fork-tailed drongo-cuckoo
- Square-tailed drongo-cuckoo
- Moluccan drongo-cuckoo
- Philippine drongo-cuckoo
- Sirkeer malkoha
- Striped cuckoo
- Pacific long-tailed cuckoo
- Red-billed malkoha

== Pterocliformes ==
Sandgrouse

- Pin-tailed sandgrouse
- Double-banded sandgrouse
- Burchell's sandgrouse
- Crowned sandgrouse
- Black-faced sandgrouse
- Chestnut-bellied sandgrouse
- Yellow-throated sandgrouse
- Painted sandgrouse
- Lichtenstein's sandgrouse
- Namaqua sandgrouse
- Black-bellied sandgrouse
- Madagascan sandgrouse
- Four-banded sandgrouse
- Spotted sandgrouse
- Pallas's sandgrouse
- Tibetan sandgrouse

== Columbiformes ==
Doves and pigeons

- Seychelles blue pigeon
- Bronze ground dove
- White-breasted ground dove
- Eastern bronze ground-dove
- Lemon dove
- Common emerald dove
- Brown-capped emerald dove
- Kererū
- Stephan's emerald dove
- Golden fruit dove
- Orange fruit dove
- Maroon-chested ground dove
- Blue ground dove
- White-naped pigeon
- White-collared pigeon
- African olive pigeon
- Bolle's pigeon
- Eastern bronze-naped pigeon
- Nilgiri wood pigeon
- Speckled pigeon
- Speckled wood pigeon
- Western bronze-naped pigeon
- Japanese wood pigeon
- White-headed pigeon
- Snow pigeon
- Rock dove
- Stock dove
- Common wood pigeon
- Ashy wood pigeon
- Hill pigeon
- Cameroon olive pigeon
- Trocaz pigeon
- Afep pigeon
- Metallic pigeon
- Ecuadorian ground dove
- Croaking ground dove
- Inca dove
- Plain-breasted ground dove
- Common ground dove
- Picui ground dove
- Scaled dove
- Ruddy ground dove
- Sombre pigeon
- Cloven-feathered dove
- Green imperial pigeon
- Mountain imperial pigeon
- Cinnamon-bellied imperial pigeon
- Pied imperial pigeon
- Rufescent imperial pigeon
- Elegant imperial pigeon
- Nilgiri imperial-pigeon
- White-bellied imperial pigeon
- Geelvink imperial-pigeon
- Dark-backed imperial pigeon
- Barking imperial pigeon
- Silver-tipped imperial pigeon
- Black imperial pigeon
- Collared imperial pigeon
- Spice imperial pigeon
- Seram imperial pigeon
- Rusty imperial-pigeon
- Pacific imperial pigeon
- Spectacled imperial pigeon
- Pinon's imperial pigeon
- Island imperial pigeon
- Grey-headed imperial pigeon
- Red-knobbed imperial pigeon
- Purple-tailed imperial pigeon
- Louisiade imperial-pigeon
- Torresian imperial pigeon
- Christmas imperial pigeon
- Zoe's imperial pigeon
- Cinnamon ground dove
- Sulawesi ground dove
- Diamond dove
- Bar-shouldered dove
- Barred dove
- Peaceful dove
- Zebra dove
- Rufous-bellied spinifex pigeon
- Spinifex pigeon
- Squatter pigeon
- Partridge pigeon
- Key West quail-dove
- Ruddy quail-dove
- Bridled quail-dove
- Sapphire quail-dove
- Violaceous quail-dove
- Papuan mountain pigeon
- Buru mountain pigeon
- Pale mountain pigeon
- Seram mountain pigeon
- Kererū
- New Guinea bronzewing
- Grey-chested dove
- Caribbean dove
- Yungas dove
- Pallid dove
- Grey-headed dove
- Grey-fronted dove
- White-tipped dove
- Olive-backed quail-dove
- Wonga pigeon
- Topknot pigeon
- Slender-billed cuckoo-dove
- Ruddy cuckoo-dove
- Mackinlay's cuckoo-dove
- Bar-necked cuckoo-dove
- Bar-tailed cuckoo-dove
- Brown cuckoo-dove
- Little cuckoo-dove
- Andaman cuckoo-dove
- Philippine cuckoo-dove
- Barred cuckoo-dove
- Scarlet-breasted fruit dove
- Wompoo fruit dove
- Golden-spotted ground dove
- Bare-faced ground dove
- Black-winged ground dove
- Moreno's ground dove
- Malagasy turtle dove
- Crested pigeon
- Namaqua dove
- Grey-naped pheasant-pigeon
- Pheasant pigeon
- Shy ground dove
- Southern band-tailed pigeon
- White-winged pigeon
- Chilean pigeon
- Pale-vented pigeon
- Bare-eyed pigeon
- Band-tailed pigeon
- Red-billed pigeon
- Dusky pigeon
- Spot-winged pigeon
- Short-billed pigeon
- Picazuro pigeon
- Plumbeous pigeon
- Scaled pigeon
- Scaly-naped pigeon
- Ruddy pigeon
- White-quilled rock pigeon
- Chestnut-quilled rock pigeon
- Amethyst brown dove
- Short-billed brown-dove
- White-eared brown dove
- Buff-eared brown-dove
- Common bronzewing
- Brush bronzewing
- Flock bronzewing
- Black-banded fruit dove
- Orange-fronted fruit dove
- Banded fruit dove
- Coroneted fruit dove
- White-capped fruit dove
- White-headed fruit dove
- Samoan fruit-dove
- Eastern ornate fruit-dove
- Red-bellied fruit dove
- Kosrae fruit-dove
- Grey-headed fruit dove
- Knob-billed fruit dove
- Orange-bellied fruit dove
- Black-naped fruit dove
- Blue-capped fruit dove
- Dwarf fruit dove
- Ornate fruit dove
- Palau fruit dove
- Pink-spotted fruit dove
- Many-coloured fruit dove
- Pohnpei fruit-dove
- Crimson-crowned fruit dove
- Pink-headed fruit dove
- Beautiful fruit dove
- Grey-green fruit dove
- Rose-crowned fruit dove
- Silver-capped fruit dove
- White-bibbed fruit dove
- Yellow-bibbed fruit dove
- Geelvink fruit-dove
- Superb fruit dove
- Tanna fruit dove
- Western superb fruit-dove
- Claret-breasted fruit dove
- Wallace's fruit dove
- Oberholser's fruit dove
- Red-eared fruit dove
- Black-chinned fruit dove
- Yellow-breasted fruit dove
- Crested cuckoo-dove
- Great cuckoo-dove
- Spotted dove
- Laughing dove
- Western spotted dove
- Island collared dove
- Ring-necked dove
- Eurasian collared dove
- Mourning collared dove
- Adamawa turtle dove
- Dusky turtle dove
- Oriental turtle dove
- White-winged collared dove
- African collared dove
- Red-eyed dove
- Red turtle dove
- Vinaceous dove
- Burmese collared-dove
- Grey-fronted green pigeon
- Pin-tailed green pigeon
- Madagascan green pigeon
- Philippine green pigeon
- Orange-breasted green pigeon
- African green pigeon
- Thick-billed green pigeon
- Grey-breasted green-pigeon
- Grey-cheeked green pigeon
- Little green pigeon
- Ryukyu green-pigeon
- Yellow-footed green pigeon
- Sri Lanka green pigeon
- Yellow-vented green pigeon
- White-bellied green pigeon
- Wedge-tailed green pigeon
- Pink-necked green pigeon
- Bruce's green pigeon
- Thick-billed ground pigeon
- White-faced dove
- Black-billed wood dove
- Blue-spotted wood dove
- Blue-headed wood dove
- Emerald-spotted wood dove
- Tambourine dove
- Long-tailed ground dove
- White-winged dove
- Eared dove
- Zenaida dove
- Galápagos dove
- Mourning dove
- West Peruvian dove
- White-faced quail-dove
- Chiriqui quail-dove
- Buff-fronted quail-dove
- White-throated quail-dove
- Purplish-backed quail-dove
- Lined quail-dove

== Gruiformes ==
Cranes, rails, finfoots, and trumpeters

=== Heliornithidae ===
Finfoots

- Sungrebe
- African finfoot

=== Sarothruridae ===
Flufftails and forest rails

- Madagascar forest rail
- Forbes's forest rail
- Chestnut forest rail
- Striped flufftail
- Streaky-breasted flufftail
- Buff-spotted flufftail
- Madagascar flufftail
- Chestnut-headed flufftail
- White-spotted flufftail
- Red-chested flufftail

=== Rallidae ===
Rails, crakes, and coots

- Uniform crake
- White-browed crake
- Isabelline bush-hen
- Striped crake
- Pale-vented bush-hen
- Plain bush-hen
- White-breasted waterhen
- Rufous-necked wood rail
- Grey-necked wood rail
- Red-winged wood rail
- Little wood rail
- Slaty-breasted wood rail
- Brown wood rail
- Giant wood rail
- Grey-throated rail
- Swinhoe's rail
- Speckled rail
- Yellow rail
- Corn crake
- African crake
- White-throated rail
- Chestnut rail
- American coot
- Andean coot
- Red-gartered coot
- Eurasian coot
- Red-knobbed coot
- Giant coot
- White-winged coot
- Red-fronted coot
- Watercock
- Lesser moorhen
- Common moorhen
- Common gallinule
- Spot-flanked gallinule
- Dusky moorhen
- Bare-eyed rail
- Blue-faced rail
- Yellow-breasted crake
- Nkulengu rail
- Santa Isabel rail (often regarded as a subspecies of Woodford's Rail)
- Buff-banded rail
- Roviana rail
- Bougainville rail
- Barred rail
- Woodford's rail
- White-throated crake
- Grey-breasted crake
- Red-and-white crake
- Rufous-sided crake
- Ruddy crake
- Lewin's rail
- Slaty-breasted rail
- Ocellated crake
- Paint-billed crake
- Spotted rail
- Blackish rail
- Plumbeous rail
- Allen's gallinule
- Azure gallinule
- American purple gallinule
- Western swamphen
- Ash-throated crake
- Sora
- Black-banded crake
- Australian crake
- Spotted crake
- White-striped forest rail
- Andaman crake
- Slaty-legged crake
- Red-legged crake
- Red-necked crake
- Water rail
- African rail
- Clapper rail
- Brown-cheeked rail
- Virginia rail
- Mangrove rail
- Chestnut-headed crake
- Russet-crowned crake
- Tasmanian nativehen
- Black-tailed nativehen
- Brown crake
- Black-tailed crake
- Black crake
- Ruddy-breasted crake
- Little crake
- Baillon's crake
- Spotless crake

=== Psophiidae ===
Trumpeters

- Grey-winged trumpeter
- Pale-winged trumpeter
- Ochre-winged trumpeter (Psophia ochroptera)

=== Gruidae ===
Cranes

- Demoiselle crane
- Sandhill crane
- Brolga
- Common crane

=== Aramidae ===
Limpkin (monotypic)

- Limpkin

== Podicipediformes ==
Grebes

- Clark's grebe
- Western grebe
- Great crested grebe
- Red-necked grebe
- Great grebe
- Black-necked grebe
- Silvery grebe
- Pied-billed grebe
- Hoary-headed grebe
- New Zealand grebe
- White-tufted grebe
- Least grebe
- Australasian grebe
- Little grebe

== Phoenicopteriformes ==
Flamingos

- Greater flamingo
- American flamingo

== Charadriiformes ==
Shorebirds and gulls

=== Turnicidae ===
Buttonquail

- Quail-plover
- Chestnut-backed buttonquail
- Sumba buttonquail
- Fynbos buttonquail
- Red-backed buttonquail
- Black-rumped buttonquail
- Madagascan buttonquail
- Spotted buttonquail
- Red-chested buttonquail
- Barred buttonquail
- Common buttonquail
- Yellow-legged buttonquail
- Painted buttonquail
- Little buttonquail

=== Burhinidae ===
Stone-curlews, thick-knees

- Double-striped thick-knee
- Spotted thick-knee
- Bush stone-curlew
- Indian stone-curlew
- Eurasian stone-curlew
- Senegal thick-knee
- Water thick-knee

=== Chionidae ===
Sheathbills

- Snowy sheathbill
- Black-faced sheathbill

=== Haematopodidae ===
Oystercatchers

- Blackish oystercatcher
- Sooty oystercatcher
- Magellanic oystercatcher
- Pied oystercatcher
- American oystercatcher
- Variable oystercatcher

=== Ibidorhynchidae ===
Ibisbill

- Ibisbill

=== Recurvirostridae ===
Stilts and avocets

- Banded stilt
- Black-winged stilt
- American avocet
- Andean avocet
- Pied avocet
- Red-necked avocet

=== Charadriidae ===
Plovers, dotterels, and lapwings

- Kentish plover
- Puna plover
- Caspian plover
- Madagascar three-banded plover
- Collared plover
- Little ringed plover
- Two-banded plover
- Forbes's plover
- Common ringed plover
- Javan plover
- Greater sand plover
- White-fronted plover
- Rufous-chested plover
- Lesser sand plover
- Chestnut-banded plover
- Kittlitz's plover
- Long-billed plover
- Red-capped plover
- Semipalmated plover
- Three-banded plover
- Oriental plover
- Wilson's plover
- Black-fronted dotterel
- Red-kneed dotterel
- Eurasian dotterel
- Pied plover
- Tawny-throated dotterel
- Inland dotterel
- European golden plover
- American golden plover
- Pacific golden plover
- Grey plover
- White-crowned lapwing
- Blacksmith lapwing
- Southern lapwing
- Grey-headed lapwing
- Crowned lapwing
- Long-toed lapwing
- Red-wattled lapwing
- White-tailed lapwing
- Senegal lapwing
- Yellow-wattled lapwing
- Spot-breasted lapwing
- Black-winged lapwing
- Masked lapwing
- Black-shouldered lapwing
- Andean lapwing
- African wattled lapwing
- Spur-winged lapwing
- Brown-chested lapwing
- Black-headed lapwing
- Banded lapwing

=== Pluvianidae ===
Egyptian plover (monotypic)

- Egyptian plover

=== Rostratulidae ===
Painted-snipes

- Greater painted-snipe

=== Jacanidae ===
Jacanas

- African jacana
- Pheasant-tailed jacana
- Comb-crested jacana
- Wattled jacana
- Northern jacana
- Bronze-winged jacana
- Lesser jacana

=== Thinocoridae ===
Seedsnipes

- Rufous-bellied seedsnipe
- White-bellied seedsnipe
- Grey-breasted seedsnipe
- Least seedsnipe

=== Scolopacidae ===
Sandpipers and snipes

- Common sandpiper
- Spotted sandpiper
- Black turnstone
- Upland sandpiper
- Sharp-tailed sandpiper
- Sanderling
- Dunlin
- Baird's sandpiper
- Broad-billed sandpiper
- White-rumped sandpiper
- Stilt sandpiper
- Purple sandpiper
- Western sandpiper
- Pectoral sandpiper
- Little stint
- Least sandpiper
- Rock sandpiper
- Ruff
- Long-toed stint
- Temminck's stint
- Surfbird
- Puna snipe
- Wilson's snipe
- Common snipe
- Latham's snipe
- Andean snipe
- Swinhoe's snipe
- African snipe
- South American snipe
- Solitary snipe
- Pin-tailed snipe
- Giant snipe
- Short-billed dowitcher
- Long-billed dowitcher
- Marbled godwit
- Hudsonian godwit
- Jack snipe
- Long-billed curlew
- Little curlew
- Whimbrel
- Red phalarope
- Red-necked phalarope
- Bukidnon woodcock
- Sulawesi woodcock
- American woodcock
- New Guinea woodcock
- Eurasian woodcock
- Wilson's phalarope
- Spotted redshank
- Lesser yellowlegs
- Wood sandpiper
- Wandering tattler
- Greater yellowlegs
- Common greenshank
- Green sandpiper
- Willet
- Solitary sandpiper
- Marsh sandpiper
- Common redshank
- Terek sandpiper

=== Dromadidae ===
Crab-plover (monotypic)

- Crab-plover

=== Glareolidae ===
Coursers and pratincoles

- Indian courser
- Cream-coloured courser
- Burchell's courser
- Somali courser
- Temminck's courser
- Grey pratincole
- Small pratincole
- Oriental pratincole
- Rock pratincole
- Collared pratincole
- Bronze-winged courser
- Three-banded courser
- Double-banded courser
- Australian pratincole

=== Laridae ===
Gulls, terns, and skimmers

- Black noddy
- Brown noddy
- Lesser noddy
- Whiskered tern
- White-winged tern
- Black tern
- Swallow-tailed gull
- Australian gull-billed tern
- Gull-billed tern
- White tern
- Little white tern
- Little gull
- Caspian tern
- European herring gull
- Armenian gull
- Laughing gull
- Belcher's gull
- Brown-headed gull
- Caspian gull
- California gull
- Common gull
- Grey-headed gull
- Black-tailed gull
- Ring-billed gull
- Kelp gull
- Lesser black-backed gull
- Slender-billed gull
- Glaucous-winged gull
- Iceland gull
- Hartlaub's gull
- Sooty gull
- Glaucous gull
- Pallas's gull
- Yellow-footed gull
- Brown-hooded gull
- Great black-backed gull
- Mediterranean gull
- Yellow-legged gull
- Grey gull
- Silver gull
- Western gull
- Pacific gull
- Bonaparte's gull
- Franklin's gull
- Black-headed gull
- Slaty-backed gull
- Dolphin gull
- Andean gull
- American herring gull
- Thayer's gull
- Aleutian tern
- Bridled tern
- Sooty tern
- Spectacled tern
- Large-billed tern
- Grey noddy
- Blue noddy
- Ross's gull
- Black-legged kittiwake
- African skimmer
- Black skimmer
- Roseate tern
- Forster's tern
- South American tern
- Common tern
- Arctic tern
- White-cheeked tern
- Black-naped tern
- Snowy-crowned tern
- Antarctic tern
- Little tern
- Least tern
- Damara tern
- Saunders's tern
- Yellow-billed tern
- Lesser crested tern
- Greater crested tern
- Royal tern
- Sandwich tern
- Sabine's gull

=== Stercorariidae ===
Skuas

- Brown skua
- Chilean skua
- South polar skua
- Great skua
- Long-tailed jaeger
- Parasitic jaeger
- Pomarine skua

=== Alcidae ===
Auks

- Crested auklet
- Parakeet auklet
- Least auklet
- Whiskered auklet
- Razorbill
- Little auk
- Spectacled guillemot
- Pigeon guillemot
- Black guillemot
- Rhinoceros auklet
- Tufted puffin
- Horned puffin
- Ancient murrelet
- Common murre
- Thick-billed murre

== Eurypygiformes ==
Sunbittern, Kagu

- Sunbittern

== Phaethontiformes ==
Tropicbirds

- Red-billed tropicbird
- White-tailed tropicbird
- Red-tailed tropicbird

== Gaviiformes ==
Loons (Divers)

- Black-throated loon
- Common loon
- Pacific loon
- Red-throated loon

== Sphenisciformes ==
Penguins

- King penguin
- Little penguin
- Chinstrap penguin
- Magellanic penguin

== Procellariiformes ==
Petrels, albatrosses, and shearwaters

=== Oceanitidae ===
Austral storm petrels

- White-bellied storm petrel
- Black-bellied storm petrel
- Grey-backed storm petrel
- Wilson's storm petrel
- White-faced storm petrel

=== Diomedeidae ===
Albatrossess

- Black-browed albatross

=== Hydrobatidae ===
Northern storm petrels

- Band-rumped storm petrel
- Fork-tailed storm petrel
- Leach's storm petrel
- Black storm petrel
- Least storm petrel
- European storm petrel
- Wedge-rumped storm petrel
- Tristram's storm petrel

=== Procellariidae ===
Petrels and shearwaters

- Kerguelen petrel
- Flesh-footed shearwater
- Great shearwater
- Wedge-tailed shearwater
- Short-tailed shearwater
- Bulwer's petrel
- Cory's shearwater
- Scopoli's shearwater
- Cape petrel
- Northern fulmar
- Southern fulmar
- Blue petrel
- Southern giant petrel
- Northern giant petrel
- Slender-billed prion
- Fulmar prion
- Antarctic prion
- Salvin's prion
- Fairy prion
- Broad-billed prion
- Snow petrel
- South Georgia diving petrel
- Magellanic diving petrel
- Common diving petrel
- Grey-faced petrel
- Herald petrel
- Bonin petrel
- White-headed petrel
- Great-winged petrel
- Soft-plumaged petrel
- Kermadec petrel
- Black-winged petrel
- Little shearwater
- Tropical shearwater
- Subantarctic shearwater
- Fluttering shearwater
- Audubon's shearwater
- Christmas shearwater
- Persian shearwater
- Manx shearwater
- Galápagos shearwater
- Antarctic petrel

== Ciconiiformes ==
Storks

- African openbill
- Asian openbill
- Abdim's stork
- White stork
- Maguari stork
- African woollyneck
- Black stork
- Black-necked stork
- Jabiru
- Marabou stork
- Wood stork
- Yellow-billed stork
- Painted stork

== Suliformes ==
Cormorants and allies

=== Fregatidae ===
Frigatebirds

- Lesser frigatebird
- Magnificent frigatebird
- Great frigatebird

=== Sulidae ===
Gannets and boobies

- Northern gannet
- Australasian gannet
- Masked booby
- Nazca booby
- Brown booby
- Blue-footed booby
- Red-footed booby
- Peruvian booby

=== Anhingidae ===
Anhingas and darters

- Anhinga
- Oriental darter
- Australasian darter
- African darter

=== Phalacrocoracidae ===
Cormorants and shags

- Reed cormorant
- Little pied cormorant
- Little cormorant
- Pygmy cormorant
- European shag
- Imperial shag
- Double-crested cormorant
- Neotropic cormorant
- Japanese cormorant
- Great cormorant
- Black-faced cormorant
- Indian cormorant
- Rock shag
- Pelagic cormorant
- Brandt's cormorant
- Spotted shag
- Little black cormorant
- Red-faced cormorant
- Australian pied cormorant
- Kerguelen shag

== Pelecaniformes ==
Pelicans, ibises, and herons

=== Threskiornithidae ===
Ibises and spoonbills

- Wattled ibis
- Hadada ibis
- Olive ibis
- Spot-breasted ibis
- Sharp-tailed ibis
- American white ibis
- Scarlet ibis
- Green ibis
- Bare-faced ibis
- Roseate spoonbill
- African spoonbill
- Yellow-billed spoonbill
- Eurasian spoonbill
- Royal spoonbill
- White-faced ibis
- Glossy ibis
- Puna ibis
- Red-naped ibis
- Plumbeous ibis
- Buff-necked ibis
- Black-faced ibis
- African sacred ibis
- Black-headed ibis
- Australian white ibis
- Straw-necked ibis

=== Ardeidae ===
Herons and bitterns

- Great egret
- Yellow-billed egret
- Grey heron
- Cocoi heron
- Goliath heron
- Great blue heron
- Intermediate egret
- Black-headed heron
- White-necked heron
- Plumed egret
- Purple heron
- Great-billed heron
- Chinese pond heron
- Indian pond heron
- Squacco heron
- Rufous-bellied heron
- Javan pond heron
- American bittern
- Pinnated bittern
- Eurasian bittern
- Cattle egret
- Green heron
- Striated heron
- White-backed night heron
- Boat-billed heron
- Black heron
- Little blue heron
- Little egret
- Western reef heron
- White-faced heron
- Pied heron
- Pacific reef heron
- Snowy egret
- Tricolored heron
- Malayan night heron
- Cinnamon bittern
- Black-backed bittern
- Least bittern
- Black bittern
- Stripe-backed bittern
- Little bittern
- Yellow bittern
- Dwarf bittern
- Yellow-crowned night heron
- Nankeen night heron
- Black-crowned night heron
- Capped heron
- Whistling heron
- White-crested tiger heron
- Fasciated tiger heron
- Rufescent tiger heron
- Bare-throated tiger heron

=== Scopidae ===
Hamerkop (monotypic)

- Hamerkop

=== Pelecanidae ===
Pelicans

- Australian pelican
- American white pelican
- Brown pelican
- Great white pelican
- Pink-backed pelican

== Opisthocomiformes ==
Hoatzin (monotypic)

- Hoatzin

== Accipitriformes ==
Hawks, eagles, kites, and vultures

=== Cathartidae ===
New World Vultures

- Turkey vulture
- Lesser yellow-headed vulture
- Greater yellow-headed vulture
- Black vulture
- King vulture

=== Pandionidae ===
Osprey (monotypic)

- Osprey

=== Accipitridae ===
Kites, hawks, eagles, and Old World Vultures

- Pied goshawk
- Shikra
- Bicoloured hawk
- Levant sparrowhawk
- Chestnut-flanked sparrowhawk
- Collared sparrowhawk
- Semi-collared hawk
- Cooper's hawk
- Rufous-necked sparrowhawk
- Red-thighed sparrowhawk
- Brown goshawk
- Frances's sparrowhawk
- Northern goshawk
- Sulawesi goshawk
- Japanese sparrowhawk
- Variable goshawk
- Black-mantled goshawk
- Black sparrowhawk
- Meyer's goshawk
- Little sparrowhawk
- Dwarf sparrowhawk
- Eurasian sparrowhawk
- Grey goshawk
- Ovambo sparrowhawk
- Grey-headed goshawk
- Vinous-breasted sparrowhawk
- Fiji goshawk
- Rufous-breasted sparrowhawk
- Chinese sparrowhawk
- Sharp-shinned hawk
- Tiny hawk
- Lesser Sundas goshawk
- African goshawk
- Red-chested goshawk
- Spot-tailed sparrowhawk
- Crested goshawk
- Besra
- Cassin's hawk-eagle
- Wedge-tailed eagle
- Golden eagle
- Bonelli's eagle
- Tawny eagle
- African hawk-eagle
- Verreaux's eagle
- African cuckoo-hawk
- Jerdon's baza
- Black baza
- Madagascar cuckoo-hawk
- Pacific baza
- Black-collared hawk
- Grey-faced buzzard
- Rufous-winged buzzard
- Grasshopper buzzard
- White-eyed buzzard
- White-throated hawk
- Zone-tailed hawk
- Augur buzzard
- Red-necked buzzard
- Madagascar buzzard
- Short-tailed hawk
- Common buzzard
- Upland buzzard
- Red-tailed hawk
- Eastern buzzard
- Rough-legged buzzard
- Red-shouldered hawk
- Grey-lined hawk
- Grey hawk
- Broad-winged hawk
- Himalayan buzzard
- Ferruginous hawk
- Long-legged buzzard
- Jackal buzzard
- Swainson's hawk
- Common black hawk
- Savanna hawk
- Slate-coloured hawk
- Great black hawk
- Scissor-tailed kite
- Hook-billed kite
- Western banded snake eagle
- Brown snake eagle
- Short-toed snake eagle
- Black-chested snake eagle
- Western marsh harrier
- Swamp harrier
- Spotted harrier
- Long-winged harrier
- Cinereous harrier
- Hen harrier
- Northern harrier
- Pied harrier
- Montagu's harrier
- African marsh harrier
- Eastern marsh harrier
- Papuan harrier
- Lesser spotted eagle
- Congo serpent eagle
- Swallow-tailed kite
- Black-shouldered kite
- Black-winged kite
- White-tailed kite
- Pearl kite
- White-tailed hawk
- Black-chested buzzard-eagle
- Variable hawk
- Crane hawk
- Palm-nut vulture
- Griffon vulture
- White-tailed eagle
- Bald eagle
- White-bellied sea eagle
- African fish eagle
- Brahminy kite
- Whistling kite
- Black-breasted buzzard
- Double-toothed kite
- Rufous-thighed kite
- Slender-billed kite
- Long-tailed honey buzzard
- Ayres's hawk-eagle
- Little eagle
- Booted eagle
- Wahlberg's eagle
- Pygmy eagle
- Black eagle
- Mississippi kite
- Plumbeous kite
- Lizard buzzard
- Grey-headed kite
- White-browed hawk
- Black-faced hawk
- Semiplumbeous hawk
- Long-crested eagle
- Square-tailed kite
- Bat hawk
- Doria's goshawk
- Pale chanting goshawk
- Dark chanting goshawk
- Eastern chanting goshawk
- Gabar goshawk
- Black kite
- Red kite
- Barred hawk
- Blyth's hawk-eagle
- Changeable hawk-eagle
- Sulawesi hawk-eagle
- White-rumped hawk
- Harris's hawk
- European honey buzzard
- Barred honey buzzard
- Crested honey buzzard
- Philippine honey-buzzard
- Madagascar harrier-hawk
- African harrier-hawk
- White hawk
- Snail kite
- Roadside hawk
- Crested serpent eagle
- Philippine serpent eagle
- Sulawesi serpent eagle
- Black-and-white hawk-eagle
- Black hawk-eagle
- Long-tailed hawk

== Strigiformes ==
Owls

=== Tytonidae ===
Barn owls

- Sri Lanka bay owl
- Oriental bay owl
- Barn owl
- African grass owl
- Ashy-faced owl
- Minahasa masked owl
- Eastern grass owl
- Lesser sooty owl
- Australian masked owl
- Sulawesi masked owl
- Greater sooty owl

=== Strigidae ===
Owls

- Northern saw-whet owl
- Boreal owl
- Buff-fronted owl
- Unspotted saw-whet owl
- Abyssinian owl
- Marsh owl
- Striped owl
- Short-eared owl
- Madagascar owl
- Long-eared owl
- Stygian owl
- Spotted owlet
- Burrowing owl
- Little owl
- White-browed hawk-owl
- Spotted eagle-owl
- Pharaoh eagle-owl
- Indian eagle-owl
- Eurasian eagle-owl
- Cape eagle-owl
- Greyish eagle-owl
- Dusky eagle-owl
- Verreaux's eagle-owl
- Akun eagle-owl
- Lesser horned owl
- Spot-bellied eagle-owl
- Fraser's eagle-owl
- Great horned owl
- Rufous-banded owl
- Black-banded owl
- Black-and-white owl
- Mottled owl
- Yungas pygmy owl
- Ferruginous pygmy owl
- Collared owlet
- African barred owlet
- Chestnut owlet
- Javan owlet
- Costa Rican pygmy owl
- Asian barred owlet
- Northern pygmy owl
- Central American pygmy owl
- Amazonian pygmy owl
- Andean pygmy owl
- East Brazilian pygmy owl
- Austral pygmy owl
- Colima pygmy owl
- Subtropical pygmy owl
- Eurasian pygmy owl
- Pearl-spotted owlet
- Pacific pygmy owl
- Jungle owlet
- Cuban pygmy owl
- Sjöstedt's barred owlet
- Red-chested owlet
- Tucuman pygmy-owl
- Tawny fish owl
- Buffy fish owl
- Brown fish owl
- Crested owl
- Bare-legged owl
- Puerto Rican owl
- White-throated screech owl
- Eastern screech owl
- Black-capped screech owl
- Bearded screech-owl
- Tropical screech owl
- Bare-shanked screech owl
- Pacific screech owl
- Middle American screech owl
- Yungas screech owl
- Rufescent screech owl
- Western screech owl
- Koepcke's screech owl
- Cloud-forest screech owl
- Cinnamon screech owl
- West Peruvian screech owl
- Long-tufted screech owl
- Balsas screech owl
- Whiskered screech owl
- Vermiculated screech-owl
- Tawny-bellied screech owl
- Elf owl
- Southern boobook
- Barking owl
- Tanimbar boobook
- Buru boobook
- Halmahera boobook
- Cinnabar boobook
- Solomons boobook
- Northern boobook
- Tasmanian boobook
- Manus boobook
- Morepork
- Hume's hawk-owl
- Luzon hawk-owl
- Speckled boobook
- Rufous boobook
- Brown hawk-owl
- Hantu boobook
- Powerful owl
- Papuan boobook
- New Ireland boobook
- Indian scops owl
- Rajah scops owl
- Pallid scops owl
- Sangihe scops owl
- Enggano scops owl
- Everett's scops owl
- Palawan scops owl
- Sandy scops owl
- Sunda scops owl
- Collared scops owl
- Luzon highland scops owl
- Moluccan scops owl
- Sulawesi scops owl
- Mantanani scops owl
- Mayotte scops owl
- Philippine scops owl
- Mentawai scops owl
- Mindanao scops owl
- Arabian scops owl
- Rainforest scops owl
- Eurasian scops owl
- Japanese scops owl
- African scops owl
- Wallace's scops owl
- Socotra scops owl
- Mountain scops owl
- Oriental scops owl
- Wetar scops-owl
- Simeulue scops owl
- Jamaican owl
- Flammulated owl
- Southern white-faced owl
- Northern white-faced owl
- Tawny-browed owl
- Band-bellied owl
- Spectacled owl
- Palau owl
- Vermiculated fishing owl
- Pel's fishing owl
- Tawny owl
- Omani owl
- Chaco owl
- Fulvous owl
- Rusty-barred owl
- Brown wood owl
- Great grey owl
- Himalayan owl
- Mottled wood owl
- Rufous-legged owl
- Spotted wood owl
- Ural owl
- Barred owl
- African wood owl
- Northern hawk-owl

== Coliiformes ==
Mousebirds

- Red-backed mousebird
- White-backed mousebird
- White-headed mousebird
- Speckled mousebird
- Red-faced mousebird
- Blue-naped mousebird

== Leptosomiformes ==
Cuckoo roller (monotypic)

- Cuckoo roller

== Trogoniformes ==
Trogons

- Sumatran trogon
- Bare-cheeked trogon
- Narina trogon
- Bar-tailed trogon
- Eared quetzal
- Philippine trogon
- Red-headed trogon
- Malabar trogon
- Orange-breasted trogon
- Ward's trogon
- Whitehead's trogon
- Crested quetzal
- Golden-headed quetzal
- White-tipped quetzal
- Pavonine quetzal
- Cuban trogon
- Hispaniolan trogon
- Coppery-tailed trogon
- Northern Surucua trogon
- White-tailed trogon
- Citreoline trogon
- Lattice-tailed trogon
- Collared trogon
- Chocó trogon
- Blue-crowned trogon
- Elegant trogon
- Slaty-tailed trogon
- Black-headed trogon
- Black-tailed trogon
- Ecuadorian trogon
- Mountain trogon
- Masked trogon
- Black-throated trogon
- Southern Surucua trogon
- Violaceous trogon
- Green-backed trogon

== Bucerotiformes ==
Hornbills and hoopoes

=== Upupidae ===
Hoopoes

- Hoopoe
- Madagascar hoopoe

=== Phoeniculidae ===
Wood hoopoes

- White-headed wood hoopoe
- Violet wood hoopoe
- Green wood hoopoe
- Black-billed wood hoopoe
- Black scimitarbill
- Forest wood hoopoe
- Common scimitarbill
- Abyssinian scimitarbill

=== Bucerotidae ===
Hornbills

- Oriental pied hornbill
- White-thighed hornbill
- Silvery-cheeked hornbill
- Trumpeter hornbill
- Piping hornbill
- Eastern piping hornbill
- Black-and-white-casqued hornbill
- Black-casqued hornbill
- White-crested hornbill
- Eastern long-tailed hornbill
- Eastern little hornbill
- Black dwarf hornbill
- Crowned hornbill
- Bradfield's hornbill
- Red-billed dwarf hornbill
- African pied hornbill
- Hemprich's hornbill
- African grey hornbill
- Pale-billed hornbill
- West African pied hornbill
- Indian grey hornbill
- Sri Lanka grey hornbill
- Malabar grey hornbill
- Mindanao hornbill
- Luzon hornbill
- Blyth's hornbill
- Damara red-billed hornbill
- Von der Decken's hornbill
- Northern red-billed hornbill
- Eastern yellow-billed hornbill
- Jackson's hornbill
- Southern yellow-billed hornbill
- Monteiro's hornbill

== Coraciiformes ==
Kingfishers and allies

=== Coraciidae ===
Rollers

- Abyssinian roller
- Indochinese roller
- Indian roller
- Lilac-breasted roller
- Blue-bellied roller
- European roller
- Purple roller
- Racket-tailed roller
- Purple-winged roller
- Cinnamon roller
- Blue-throated roller
- Oriental dollarbird

=== Brachypteraciidae ===
Ground rollers

- Pitta-like ground roller

=== Alcedinidae ===
Kingfishers

- Moustached kingfisher
- Hombron's kingfisher
- Spotted wood kingfisher
- Common kingfisher
- Cerulean kingfisher
- Blue-eared kingfisher
- Shining-blue kingfisher
- Half-collared kingfisher
- Glittering kingfisher
- Pied kingfisher
- Azure kingfisher
- New Georgia dwarf kingfisher
- Indigo-banded kingfisher
- Oriental dwarf kingfisher
- Moluccan dwarf kingfisher
- Dimorphic dwarf kingfisher
- North Solomons dwarf kingfisher
- North Philippine dwarf kingfisher
- South Philippine dwarf-kingfisher
- New Ireland dwarf kingfisher
- Guadalcanal dwarf kingfisher
- Little kingfisher
- New Britain dwarf kingfisher
- Papuan dwarf kingfisher
- American pygmy kingfisher
- Amazon kingfisher
- Green kingfisher
- Green-and-rufous kingfisher
- Lilac kingfisher
- Shovel-billed kookaburra
- Malachite kingfisher
- White-bellied kingfisher
- Madagascan pygmy kingfisher
- Principe kingfisher
- Sao Tome kingfisher
- Malagasy kingfisher
- Rufous-bellied kookaburra
- Blue-winged kookaburra
- Laughing kookaburra
- Spangled kookaburra
- Brown-hooded kingfisher
- Chocolate-backed kingfisher
- Striped kingfisher
- Ruddy kingfisher
- Javan kingfisher
- White-throated kingfisher
- Grey-headed kingfisher
- Blue-breasted kingfisher
- Woodland kingfisher
- Mangrove kingfisher
- White-breasted kingfisher
- African dwarf kingfisher
- African pygmy kingfisher
- Black-faced kingfisher
- Banded kingfisher
- Belted kingfisher
- Crested kingfisher
- Giant kingfisher
- Ringed kingfisher
- Hook-billed kingfisher
- Stork-billed kingfisher
- Great-billed kingfisher
- Mountain kingfisher
- Yellow-billed kingfisher
- Brown-headed paradise kingfisher
- Common paradise kingfisher
- Black-capped paradise kingfisher
- Red-breasted paradise kingfisher
- Buff-breasted paradise kingfisher
- Collared kingfisher
- Blue-and-white kingfisher
- Sombre kingfisher
- Ultramarine kingfisher
- Forest kingfisher
- Red-backed kingfisher
- Flat-billed kingfisher
- Mewing kingfisher
- Sacred kingfisher
- Beach kingfisher
- Society kingfisher

=== Todidae ===
Todies

- Narrow-billed tody
- Puerto Rican tody
- Cuban tody
- Broad-billed tody
- Jamaican tody

=== Momotidae ===
Motmots

- Blue-throated motmot
- Rufous motmot
- Rufous-capped motmot
- Broad-billed motmot
- Turquoise-browed motmot
- Tody motmot
- Highland motmot
- Trinidad motmot
- Blue-capped motmot
- Blue-diademed motmot
- Russet-crowned motmot
- Blue-crowned motmot
- Whooping motmot

=== Meropidae ===
Bee-eaters

- Purple-bearded bee-eater
- White-throated bee-eater
- Rufous-crowned bee-eater
- European bee-eater
- Böhm's bee-eater
- Black-headed bee-eater
- White-fronted bee-eater
- Red-throated bee-eater
- Arabian green bee-eater
- Black bee-eater
- Swallow-tailed bee-eater
- Ethiopian bee-eater
- Chestnut-headed bee-eater
- Rosy bee-eater
- Blue-headed bee-eater
- Southern carmine bee-eater
- Northern carmine bee-eater
- Cinnamon-chested bee-eater
- Green bee-eater
- Rainbow bee-eater
- Blue-cheeked bee-eater
- Blue-tailed bee-eater
- Little bee-eater
- Somali bee-eater
- Olive bee-eater
- Blue-breasted bee-eater
- Blue-throated bee-eater
- African green bee-eater
- Red-bearded bee-eater
- Blue-bearded bee-eater

== Piciformes ==
Woodpeckers, toucans, and barbets

=== Galbulidae ===
Jacamars

- White-throated jacamar
- Pale-headed jacamar
- Brown jacamar
- Dusky-backed jacamar
- White-eared jacamar
- Purus jacamar
- Yellow-billed jacamar
- Cerise-crowned jacamar
- Purplish jacamar
- Bluish-fronted jacamar
- Blue-necked jacamar
- Paradise jacamar
- Green-tailed jacamar
- Bronzy jacamar
- Coppery-chested jacamar
- Rufous-tailed jacamar
- White-chinned jacamar
- Great jacamar

=== Bucconidae ===
Puffbirds

- Collared puffbird
- Swallow-winged puffbird
- Chestnut-capped puffbird
- White-faced nunbird
- Two-banded puffbird
- Russet-throated puffbird
- Black-streaked puffbird
- White-chested puffbird
- Moustached puffbird
- White-whiskered puffbird
- Rufous-necked puffbird
- Semicollared puffbird
- Greater crescent-chested puffbird
- Lanceolated monklet
- Black nunbird
- Yellow-billed nunbird
- White-fronted nunbird
- Black-fronted nunbird
- Chestnut-headed nunlet
- Brown nunlet
- Grey-cheeked nunlet
- Rusty-breasted nunlet
- Rufous-capped nunlet
- Fulvous-chinned nunlet
- White-necked puffbird
- Guianan puffbird
- Brown-banded puffbird
- Black-breasted puffbird
- Lesser pied puffbird
- Buff-bellied puffbird
- Pied puffbird
- Spotted puffbird
- White-eared puffbird
- Spot-backed puffbird
- Barred puffbird
- Striolated puffbird

=== Capitonidae ===
New World barbets

- Gilded barbet
- Scarlet-crowned barbet
- Brown-chested barbet
- White-mantled barbet
- Spot-crowned barbet
- Black-spotted barbet
- Orange-fronted barbet
- Flame-throated barbet
- Red-headed barbet
- Lemon-throated barbet
- Blue-cowled barbet
- Scarlet-hooded barbet
- Versicoloured barbet

=== Semnornithidae ===
Toucan barbets

- Prong-billed barbet

=== Ramphastidae ===
Toucans

- Hooded mountain toucan
- Grey-breasted mountain toucan
- Black-billed mountain toucan
- Greyish-throated toucanet (Aulacorhynchus albivitta)
- Black-throated toucanet (Aulacorhynchus atrogularis)
- Blue-throated toucanet
- Yellow-billed toucanet (Aulacorhynchus calorhynchus)
- Blue-banded toucanet
- Black-billed toucanet
- Chestnut-tipped toucanet
- Crimson-rumped toucanet
- Emerald toucanet
- Groove-billed toucanet
- Wagler's toucanet (Aulacorhynchus wagleri)
- Tepui toucanet
- Black-necked aracari
- Ivory-billed aracari
- Curl-crested aracari
- Chestnut-eared aracari
- Pale-mandibled aracari
- Fiery-billed aracari
- Humboldt's araçari
- Lettered aracari
- Many-banded aracari
- Stripe-billed aracari
- Western red-necked araçari
- Collared aracari
- Green aracari
- Yellow-throated toucan
- Choco toucan
- Yellow-ridged toucan (Ramphastos culminatus)
- Cuvier's toucan (Ramphastos cuvieri)
- Green-billed toucan
- Toco toucan
- White-throated toucan
- Channel-billed toucan
- Gould's toucanet
- Green-billed toucanet (Selenidera langsdorffii)
- Spot-billed toucanet
- Tawny-tufted toucanet
- Guianan toucanet
- Golden-collared toucanet
- Yellow-eared toucanet

=== Megalaimidae ===
Asian barbets

- Brown barbet
- Annam barbet
- Flame-fronted barbet
- Blue-throated barbet
- Necklaced barbet
- Blue-eared barbet
- Turquoise-throated barbet
- Golden-whiskered barbet
- Brown-throated barbet
- Blue-eared barbet
- Black-eared barbet
- Bornean barbet
- Chinese barbet
- Green-eared barbet
- Yellow-fronted barbet
- Golden-throated barbet
- Coppersmith barbet
- Moustached barbet
- Black-banded barbet
- Red-vented barbet
- Lineated barbet
- Malabar barbet
- Mountain barbet
- Taiwan barbet
- Black-browed barbet
- Golden-naped barbet
- Fire-tufted barbet
- Crimson-fronted barbet
- Great barbet
- White-cheeked barbet
- Brown-headed barbet

=== Lybiidae ===
African barbets

- Yellow-spotted barbet
- Green barbet
- Grey-throated barbet
- Naked-faced barbet
- Grey-headed barbet
- Bristle-nosed barbet
- Sladen's barbet
- Pale-throated barbet
- Black-billed barbet
- White-headed barbet
- White-bellied barbet
- Brown-and-white barbet
- Black-collared barbet
- Banded barbet
- Vieillot's barbet
- Red-rumped tinkerbird
- Yellow-rumped tinkerbird
- Yellow-fronted tinkerbird
- Western tinkerbird
- Moustached tinkerbird
- Red-fronted tinkerbird
- Speckled tinkerbird
- Green tinkerbird
- Yellow-throated tinkerbird
- Double-toothed barbet
- Bearded barbet
- White-faced barbet
- Brown-breasted barbet
- Black-backed barbet
- Black-breasted barbet
- Anchieta's barbet
- White-lined barbet
- White-eared barbet
- Whyte's barbet
- Western yellow-billed barbet
- Yellow-billed barbet
- Togo yellow-billed barbet
- D'Arnaud's barbet
- Emin's barbet
- Red-and-yellow barbet
- Yellow-breasted barbet
- Usambiro barbet
- Crested barbet
- Red-fronted barbet
- Miombo pied barbet
- Hairy-breasted barbet
- Spot-flanked barbet
- Acacia pied barbet
- Black-throated barbet

=== Indicatoridae ===
Honeyguides

- Least honeyguide
- Greater honeyguide
- Spotted honeyguide
- Pallid honeyguide
- Lesser honeyguide
- Dwarf honeyguide
- Scaly-throated honeyguide
- Willcocks's honeyguide
- Yellow-rumped honeyguide
- Lyre-tailed honeyguide
- Zenker's honeyguide
- Cassin's honeybird
- Brown-backed honeybird
- Green-backed honeybird

=== Picidae ===
Woodpeckers

- Bay woodpecker
- Maroon woodpecker
- Guayaquil woodpecker
- Pale-billed woodpecker
- Crimson-bellied woodpecker
- Cream-backed woodpecker
- Magellanic woodpecker
- Crimson-crested woodpecker
- Powerful woodpecker
- Robust woodpecker
- Red-necked woodpecker
- Splendid woodpecker
- Golden-tailed woodpecker
- Bennett's woodpecker
- Green-backed woodpecker
- Brown-eared woodpecker
- Little green woodpecker
- Mombasa woodpecker
- Buff-spotted woodpecker
- Nubian woodpecker
- Fine-spotted woodpecker
- Speckle-throated woodpecker
- Fine-banded woodpecker
- Tullberg's woodpecker
- Chestnut-coloured woodpecker
- Chestnut woodpecker
- Blond-crested woodpecker
- Cream-colored woodpecker
- Scaly-breasted woodpecker
- Cinnamon woodpecker
- Pale-crested woodpecker
- Amazonian black-breasted woodpecker
- Ochre-backed woodpecker
- Rufous-headed woodpecker
- Ringed woodpecker
- Waved woodpecker
- White-naped woodpecker
- Greater flameback
- Luzon flameback
- Buff-spotted flameback
- Crimson-backed flameback
- Orange-backed woodpecker
- Greater yellownape
- Javan yellownape
- Banded woodpecker
- Bronze-winged woodpecker
- Black-crowned woodpecker
- Black-necked woodpecker
- Northern flicker
- Grey-crowned woodpecker
- Red-shafted flicker
- Campo flicker
- Pampas flicker
- Gilded flicker
- Northern Andean flicker
- Green-barred woodpecker
- Golden-breasted woodpecker
- Guatemalan flicker
- Chilean flicker
- Spot-breasted woodpecker
- Crimson-mantled woodpecker
- Golden-olive woodpecker
- Andean flicker
- Freckle-breasted woodpecker
- Sind woodpecker
- Stripe-breasted woodpecker
- Darjeeling woodpecker
- Himalayan woodpecker
- Rufous-bellied woodpecker
- White-winged woodpecker
- White-backed woodpecker
- Fulvous-breasted woodpecker
- Great spotted woodpecker
- Syrian woodpecker
- Abyssinian woodpecker
- Little grey woodpecker
- Elliot's woodpecker
- Cardinal woodpecker
- Gabon woodpecker
- Grey woodpecker
- Olive woodpecker
- Johnston's woodpecker
- Melancholy woodpecker
- Bearded woodpecker
- Brown-backed woodpecker
- Speckle-breasted woodpecker
- Fire-bellied woodpecker
- Grey-headed woodpecker
- Stierling's woodpecker
- Yellow-crested woodpecker
- Black-rumped flameback
- Common flameback
- Lesser Sri Lanka flameback
- Himalayan flameback
- Scarlet-breasted woodpecker
- Lesser spotted woodpecker
- Nuttall's woodpecker
- Crimson-breasted woodpecker
- Downy woodpecker
- Ladder-backed woodpecker
- White-bellied woodpecker
- Black woodpecker
- Pale-headed woodpecker
- Bamboo woodpecker
- Ground woodpecker
- Heart-spotted woodpecker
- Red-crested woodpecker
- Grey-and-buff woodpecker
- Dusky-winged woodpecker
- Lineated woodpecker
- Pileated woodpecker
- Red-throated wryneck
- Eurasian wryneck
- Brown-fronted woodpecker
- Yellow-crowned woodpecker
- Middle spotted woodpecker
- White-headed woodpecker
- Arizona woodpecker
- Smoky-brown woodpecker
- Strickland's woodpecker
- Hairy woodpecker
- Buff-rumped woodpecker
- Black-and-buff woodpecker
- Golden-fronted woodpecker
- White-fronted woodpecker
- White woodpecker
- Red-bellied woodpecker
- Golden-naped woodpecker
- Golden-cheeked woodpecker
- Yellow-tufted woodpecker
- Red-headed woodpecker
- Yellow-fronted woodpecker
- Acorn woodpecker
- Hoffmann's woodpecker
- Grey-breasted woodpecker
- Lewis's woodpecker
- Puerto Rican woodpecker
- Black-cheeked woodpecker
- Beautiful woodpecker
- Yucatan woodpecker
- Jamaican woodpecker
- Red-crowned woodpecker
- Hispaniolan woodpecker
- West Indian woodpecker
- Gila woodpecker
- Rufous woodpecker
- Ashy woodpecker
- Antillean piculet
- Black-backed woodpecker
- Grey-capped pygmy woodpecker
- Dark-bodied woodpecker
- Japanese pygmy woodpecker
- Philippine pygmy woodpecker
- Sunda pygmy woodpecker
- Brown-capped woodpecker
- Sulawesi pygmy woodpecker
- Eurasian three-toed woodpecker
- Yellow-browed woodpecker
- Stripe-cheeked woodpecker
- Golden-green woodpecker
- Yellow-throated woodpecker
- White-throated woodpecker
- Lita woodpecker
- Rufous-winged woodpecker
- White-wedged piculet
- Bar-breasted piculet
- Plain-breasted piculet
- Chestnut piculet
- White-barred piculet
- Ocellated piculet
- Golden-spangled piculet
- Rusty-necked piculet
- Greyish piculet
- Speckled piculet
- Lafresnaye's piculet
- Ochraceous piculet
- Arrowhead piculet
- Mottled piculet
- Black-dotted piculet
- Olivaceous piculet
- Orinoco piculet
- Spotted piculet
- Rufous-breasted piculet
- Ecuadorian piculet
- White-bellied piculet
- Scaled piculet
- Fine-barred piculet
- Ochre-collared piculet
- Japanese green woodpecker
- Grey-headed woodpecker
- Lesser yellownape
- Black-headed woodpecker
- Black-naped woodpecker
- Crimson-winged woodpecker
- Iberian green woodpecker
- Scaly-bellied woodpecker
- Levaillant's woodpecker
- Streak-breasted woodpecker
- European green woodpecker
- Laced woodpecker
- Streak-throated woodpecker
- Rufous piculet
- White-browed piculet
- Red-naped sapsucker
- Red-breasted sapsucker
- Williamson's sapsucker
- Yellow-bellied sapsucker
- Red-stained woodpecker
- Scarlet-backed woodpecker
- Golden-collared woodpecker
- Chocó woodpecker
- Yellow-vented woodpecker
- Dot-fronted woodpecker
- Red-rumped woodpecker
- Striped woodpecker
- Yellow-eared woodpecker
- Checkered woodpecker
- Bar-bellied woodpecker
- Little woodpecker
- Blood-coloured woodpecker
- White-spotted woodpecker
- African piculet
- Cuban green woodpecker

== Cariamiformes ==
Seriemas

- Red-legged seriema
- Black-legged seriema

== Falconiformes ==
Falcons and caracaras

- Northern crested caracara
- Southern crested caracara
- Black caracara
- Fox kestrel
- Amur falcon
- Grey kestrel
- Brown falcon
- Lanner falcon
- Nankeen kestrel
- Merlin
- African hobby
- Dickinson's kestrel
- Eleonora's falcon
- Aplomado falcon
- Australian hobby
- Prairie falcon
- Spotted kestrel
- Lesser kestrel
- Malagasy kestrel
- Peregrine falcon
- Falco ruficollis
- Bat falcon
- Greater kestrel
- Gyrfalcon
- Oriental hobby
- American kestrel
- Eurasian hobby
- Black falcon
- Common kestrel
- Banded kestrel
- Laughing falcon
- Red-throated caracara
- Buckley's forest falcon
- Lined forest falcon
- Cryptic forest falcon
- Slaty-backed forest falcon
- Barred forest falcon
- Collared forest falcon
- Collared falconet
- Philippine falconet
- Black-thighed falconet
- Pied falconet
- Yellow-headed caracara
- White-throated caracara
- Carunculated caracara
- Chimango caracara
- Mountain caracara
- Pygmy falcon
- Spot-winged falconet

== Psittaciformes ==
Parrots

=== Cacatuidae ===
Cockatoos

- Solomons cockatoo
- Sulphur-crested cockatoo
- Major Mitchell's cockatoo
- Western corella
- Little corella
- Long-billed corella
- Gang-gang cockatoo
- Red-tailed black cockatoo
- Glossy black cockatoo
- Galah
- Cockatiel
- Yellow-tailed black cockatoo

=== Psittacidae ===
African & New World parrots

- White-fronted amazon
- Orange-winged amazon
- Red-lored amazon
- Diademed amazon
- Scaly-naped amazon
- Yellow-crowned amazon
- Yucatan amazon
- Blue-and-yellow macaw
- Red-and-green macaw
- Scarlet macaw
- Chestnut-fronted macaw
- Jandaya parakeet
- Sulphur-breasted parakeet
- Nanday parakeet
- Dusky-headed parakeet
- Barred parakeet
- Andean parakeet
- Yellow-chevroned parakeet
- Golden-winged parakeet
- Cobalt-winged parakeet
- Orange-chinned parakeet
- Tui parakeet
- Plain parakeet
- White-winged parakeet
- Burrowing parrot
- Red-fan parrot
- Southern red-shouldered macaw
- Red-shouldered macaw
- Austral parakeet
- Slender-billed parakeet
- Aztec parakeet
- Peach-fronted parakeet
- Caatinga parakeet
- Brown-throated parakeet
- Pacific parrotlet
- Spectacled parrotlet
- Dusky-billed parrotlet
- Green-rumped parrotlet
- Turquoise-winged parrotlet
- Blue-winged parrotlet
- Short-tailed parrot
- Black-winged parrot
- Golden-plumed parakeet
- Cliff parakeet
- Monk parakeet
- Amazonian parrotlet
- Tepui parrotlet
- Red-bellied macaw
- Collared lory
- Black-headed parrot
- Black-legged parrot
- Pileated parrot
- Bronze-winged parrot
- Dusky parrot
- Scaly-headed parrot
- Blue-headed parrot
- Blue-breasted parrot
- White-crowned parrot
- White-capped parrot
- Red-billed parrot
- Speckle-faced parrot
- Niam-Niam parrot
- Brown-headed parrot
- Yellow-fronted parrot
- Red-fronted parrot
- Meyer's parrot
- Cape parrot
- Rüppell's parrot
- Red-bellied parrot
- Senegal parrot
- Golden-collared macaw
- Red-rumped parrot
- Mountain parakeet
- Grey-hooded parakeet
- Blue-crowned parakeet
- Finsch's parakeet
- Green parakeet
- White-eyed parakeet
- Mitred parakeet
- Red-throated parakeet
- Brown-hooded parrot
- Rose-faced parrot
- Fiery-shouldered parakeet
- Venezuelan parakeet
- Maroon-bellied parakeet
- Blood-eared parakeet
- Sulphur-winged parakeet
- Bonaparte's parakeet
- Maroon-tailed parakeet
- Green-cheeked parakeet
- Choco parakeet
- Garlepp's parakeet
- Wavy-breasted parakeet (Pyrrhura peruviana)
- Painted parakeet
- Rose-crowned parakeet
- Rose-fronted parakeet
- Black-capped parakeet
- Madeira parakeet
- Vulturine parrot
- Crimson-bellied parakeet
- Lilac-tailed parrotlet
- Blue-fronted parrotlet
- Scarlet-shouldered parrotlet
- Sapphire-rumped parrotlet
- Blue-bellied parrot

=== Psittaculidae ===
Old World parrots

- Grey-headed lovebird
- Yellow-collared lovebird
- Red-headed lovebird
- Rosy-faced lovebird
- Black-collared lovebird
- Black-winged lovebird
- Moluccan king parrot
- Papuan king parrot
- Australian king parrot
- Red-winged parrot
- Australian ringneck
- Guaiabero
- Black lory
- Cardinal lory
- Brown lory
- Yellowish-streaked lory
- Josephine's lorikeet
- Duchess lorikeet
- Meek's lorikeet
- Striated lorikeet
- Palm lorikeet
- Papuan lorikeet
- Red-flanked lorikeet
- Fairy lorikeet
- Red-chinned lorikeet
- Red-fronted lorikeet
- Stella's lorikeet
- Pygmy lorikeet
- Greater vasa parrot
- Red-crowned parakeet
- Creamy-breasted fig-parrot
- Double-eyed fig parrot
- Orange-breasted fig parrot
- Dusky-cheeked fig-parrot
- Black-fronted fig-parrot
- Papuan eclectus
- Moluccan eclectus
- Red lory
- Violet-necked lory
- Red-cheeked parrot
- Song parrot
- Rennell parrot
- Blue-collared parrot
- Musk lorikeet
- Purple-crowned lorikeet
- Little lorikeet
- Moluccan hanging parrot
- Orange-fronted hanging parrot
- Sri Lanka hanging parrot
- Blue-crowned hanging parrot
- Philippine hanging parrot
- Sula hanging parrot
- Great hanging parrot
- Bismarck hanging parrot
- Vernal hanging parrot
- Pygmy hanging parrot
- Yellow-bibbed lory
- Purple-bellied lory
- Black-capped lory
- Budgerigar
- Red-breasted pygmy parrot
- Finsch's pygmy parrot
- Geelvink pygmy parrot
- Yellow-capped pygmy parrot
- Meek's pygmy parrot
- Buff-faced pygmy parrot
- Elegant parrot
- Rock parrot
- Turquoise parrot
- Scarlet-chested parrot
- Bourke's parrot
- Yellow-billed lorikeet
- Orange-billed lorikeet
- Eastern bluebonnet
- Plum-faced lorikeet
- Ground parrot
- Regent parrot
- Superb parrot
- Pale-headed rosella
- Green rosella
- Crimson rosella
- Eastern rosella
- Western rosella
- Northern rosella
- Blue-crowned racket-tail
- Buru racket-tail
- Golden-mantled racket-tail
- Maroon shining parrot
- Hooded parrot
- Mulga parrot
- Dusky lory
- Brehm's tiger parrot
- Snow mountain tiger parrot
- Madarasz's tiger parrot
- Modest tiger parrot
- Painted tiger parrot
- Layard's parakeet
- Blue-winged parakeet
- Plum-headed parakeet
- Slaty-headed parakeet
- Rose-ringed parakeet
- Red-faced fig-parrot (Psittaculirostris cervicalis)
- Large fig parrot
- Edwards's fig parrot
- Yellow-naped fig-parrot (Psittaculirostris godmani)
- Salvadori's fig parrot
- Goldie's lorikeet
- Varied lorikeet
- Red-capped parrot
- Great-billed parrot
- Azure-rumped parrot
- Marigold lorikeet
- Scaly-breasted lorikeet
- Olive-headed lorikeet
- Coconut lorikeet
- Mustard-capped lorikeet
- Rainbow lorikeet
- Ornate lorikeet
- Red-collared lorikeet
- Blue-crowned lorikeet

== Passeriformes ==
Passerines

=== Acanthisittidae ===
New Zealand wrens

- Rifleman

=== Sapayoidae ===
Sapayoa (monotypic)

- Broad-billed sapayoa

=== Philepittidae ===
Asities

- Common sunbird-asity
- Velvet asity

=== Eurylaimidae ===
Broadbills

- Dusky broadbill
- Irrawaddy broadbill
- Black-and-red broadbill
- Banded broadbill
- Javan broadbill
- Long-tailed broadbill
- Silver-breasted broadbill
- Grey-lored broadbill

=== Calyptomenidae ===
African & green broadbills

- Hose's broadbill
- Whitehead's broadbill
- African broadbill
- Rufous-sided broadbill
- Grey-headed broadbill

=== Pittidae ===
Pittas

- Blue-banded pitta
- Sulawesi pitta
- Sula pitta
- Philippine pitta
- Whiskered pitta
- Papuan pitta
- Bismarck pitta
- South Moluccan pitta
- North Moluccan pitta
- Black-crowned pitta
- Graceful pitta
- Blue pitta
- Bar-bellied pitta
- Javan banded pitta
- Blue-naped pitta
- Rusty-naped pitta
- Eared pitta
- Schneider's pitta
- Bornean banded pitta
- Blue-rumped pitta
- African pitta
- Indian pitta
- Ornate pitta
- Elegant pitta
- Rainbow pitta
- Ivory-breasted pitta
- Blue-winged pitta
- Eastern hooded pitta
- Green-breasted pitta
- Western hooded pitta
- Noisy pitta
- Banda Sea pitta

=== Furnariidae ===
Ovenbirds

- Montane foliage-gleaner
- Scaly-throated foliage-gleaner
- Bamboo foliage-gleaner
- White-collared foliage-gleaner
- Chestnut-winged hookbill
- Firewood-gatherer
- Thorn-tailed rayadito
- Austral canastero
- Short-billed canastero
- Ochre-browed thistletail
- Rusty-vented canastero
- Many-striped canastero
- White-chinned thistletail
- Mouse-colored thistletail
- Black-throated thistletail
- Puna thistletail
- Streak-throated canastero
- Scribble-tailed canastero
- Cordilleran canastero
- Itatiaia spinetail
- Rusty-fronted canastero
- Eye-ringed thistletail
- Canyon canastero
- Sharp-billed canastero
- Puna canastero
- Vilcabamba thistletail
- Junín canastero
- Streak-backed canastero
- Olive-backed foliage-gleaner
- White-eyed foliage-gleaner
- Brown-rumped foliage-gleaner
- Buff-throated foliage-gleaner
- Ruddy foliage-gleaner
- Chestnut-crowned foliage-gleaner
- Point-tailed palmcreeper
- Black-billed scythebill
- Curve-billed scythebill
- Brown-billed scythebill
- Red-billed scythebill
- Yellow-chinned spinetail
- Red-and-white spinetail
- Pale-browed treehunter
- Chestnut-winged cinclodes
- Cream-winged cinclodes
- Blackish cinclodes
- White-winged cinclodes
- Cordoba cinclodes
- Stout-billed cinclodes
- Buff-winged cinclodes
- Chilean seaside cinclodes
- Olrog's cinclodes
- Grey-flanked cinclodes
- Dark-bellied cinclodes
- Peruvian seaside cinclodes
- Lark-like brushrunner
- Creamy-crested spinetail
- Light-crowned spinetail
- Line-cheeked spinetail
- Baron's spinetail
- Ash-browed spinetail
- Tepui spinetail
- Coiba spinetail
- Red-faced spinetail
- Speckled spinetail
- Streak-capped spinetail
- Marcapata spinetail
- Scaled spinetail
- Olive spinetail
- Pallid spinetail
- Stripe-crowned spinetail
- Grey-headed spinetail
- Crested spinetail
- Sulphur-bearded spinetail
- Parker's spinetail
- Rusty-backed spinetail
- Vilcabamba spinetail
- Spot-throated woodcreeper
- Mournful long-tailed woodcreeper
- Piping long-tailed woodcreeper
- Cinnamon-throated woodcreeper
- Tawny-winged woodcreeper
- Plain-brown woodcreeper
- Ruddy woodcreeper
- White-chinned woodcreeper
- Tyrannine woodcreeper
- Amazonian barred woodcreeper
- Hoffmanns's woodcreeper
- Black-banded woodcreeper
- Planalto woodcreeper
- Northern barred woodcreeper
- Whistling long-tailed woodcreeper
- Zimmer's woodcreeper
- Straight-billed woodcreeper
- Greater scythebill
- Scimitar-billed woodcreeper
- Crested hornero
- Band-tailed hornero
- Pale-legged hornero
- Lesser hornero
- Rufous hornero
- Bay hornero
- Striated earthcreeper
- Short-billed miner
- Thick-billed miner
- Common miner
- Creamy-rumped miner
- Greyish miner
- Coastal miner
- Puna miner
- Rufous-banded miner
- Dark-winged miner
- Slender-billed miner
- Wedge-billed woodcreeper
- Red-billed woodcreeper
- Bar-bellied woodcreeper
- Sharp-billed treehunter
- White-browed spinetail
- Henna-hooded foliage-gleaner
- Henna-capped foliage-gleaner
- Striped woodhaunter
- Spot-crowned woodcreeper
- Guianan woodcreeper
- Narrow-billed woodcreeper
- Scalloped woodcreeper
- Montane woodcreeper
- White-striped woodcreeper
- Streak-headed woodcreeper
- Scaled woodcreeper
- Plain-mantled tit-spinetail
- Andean tit-spinetail
- Brown-capped tit-spinetail
- Rusty-crowned tit-spinetail
- Tufted tit-spinetail
- Streak-backed tit-spinetail
- Striolated tit-spinetail
- Curve-billed reedhaunter
- Sharp-tailed streamcreeper
- Ruddy treerunner
- Pearled treerunner
- Great xenops
- Orange-fronted plushcrown
- Rufous-tailed xenops
- Long-billed woodcreeper
- Rock earthcreeper
- Crag chilia
- Band-tailed earthcreeper
- Straight-billed earthcreeper
- Orange-eyed thornbird
- Orange-breasted thornbird
- Spot-breasted thornbird
- Greater thornbird
- Rufous-fronted thornbird
- Little thornbird
- Streak-fronted thornbird
- Freckle-breasted thornbird
- Black-capped foliage-gleaner
- Rufous-rumped foliage-gleaner
- Chestnut-winged foliage-gleaner
- Slaty-winged foliage-gleaner
- Ochre-breasted foliage-gleaner
- Cinnamon-rumped foliage-gleaner
- Rufous-tailed foliage-gleaner
- Buff-fronted foliage-gleaner
- Wren-like rushbird
- Spotted barbtail
- Rusty-winged barbtail
- Cactus canastero
- Dusky-tailed canastero
- Patagonian canastero
- Steinbach's canastero
- Streaked tuftedcheek
- Buffy tuftedcheek
- Caatinga cacholote
- White-throated cacholote
- Brown cacholote
- Grey-crested cacholote
- White-throated treerunner
- Roraiman barbtail
- Chotoy spinetail
- Black-tailed leaftosser
- Scaly-throated leaftosser
- Tawny-throated leaftosser
- Short-billed leaftosser
- Rufous-breasted leaftosser
- Bolivian recurvebill
- Spectacled prickletail
- Olivaceous woodcreeper
- Des Murs's wiretail
- Pale-breasted spinetail
- Dark-breasted spinetail
- White-lored spinetail
- Azara's spinetail
- Slaty spinetail
- White-whiskered spinetail
- Black-throated spinetail
- Grey-bellied spinetail
- Stripe-breasted spinetail
- Rufous-breasted spinetail
- Sooty-fronted spinetail
- Plain-crowned spinetail
- Cinereous-breasted spinetail
- McConnell's spinetail
- White-bellied spinetail
- Rufous-capped spinetail
- Ruddy spinetail
- Ochre-cheeked spinetail
- Spix's spinetail
- Necklaced spinetail
- Silvery-throated spinetail
- Rufous spinetail
- Planalto foliage-gleaner
- Guttulate foliage-gleaner
- Tepui foliage-gleaner
- Buff-browed foliage-gleaner
- Lineated foliage-gleaner
- Chaco earthcreeper
- Bolivian earthcreeper
- Flammulated treehunter
- Striped treehunter
- Uniform treehunter
- Black-billed treehunter
- Streak-breasted treehunter
- Peruvian treehunter
- Streak-capped treehunter
- Plain softtail
- White-throated earthcreeper
- Scale-throated earthcreeper
- Plain-breasted earthcreeper
- Patagonian forest earthcreeper
- Buff-breasted earthcreeper
- Double-banded greytail
- Plain xenops
- Streaked xenops
- Slender-billed xenops
- White-throated woodcreeper
- Great rufous woodcreeper
- Strong-billed woodcreeper
- Elegant woodcreeper
- Spotted woodcreeper
- Ivory-billed woodcreeper
- Lesser woodcreeper
- Buff-throated woodcreeper
- Black-striped woodcreeper
- Striped woodcreeper
- Ocellated woodcreeper
- Chestnut-rumped woodcreeper
- Spix's woodcreeper
- Cocoa woodcreeper
- Olive-backed woodcreeper

=== Thamnophilidae ===
Antbirds

- Giant antshrike
- Grey antbird
- Willis's antbird
- Manu antbird
- Mato Grosso antbird
- Blackish antbird
- Jet antbird
- Parker's antbird
- Black antbird
- Dusky antbird
- Fasciated antshrike
- Bamboo antshrike
- Banded antbird
- East Andean antbird
- Striated antbird
- Ferruginous antbird
- Rufous-tailed antbird
- Dusky-tailed antbird
- Bertoni's antbird
- Scaled antbird
- White-streaked antvireo
- Plain antvireo
- Spot-crowned antvireo
- Streak-crowned antvireo
- Rufous-backed antvireo
- Rufous-tailed antwren
- Yasuni antwren
- Checker-throated antwren
- Stipple-throated antwren
- White-eyed antwren
- Ornate antwren
- Foothill antwren
- White-fringed antwren
- Black-bellied antwren
- Rusty-backed antwren
- Serra antwren
- Undulated antshrike
- Black-throated antshrike
- Bare-crowned antbird
- White-cheeked antbird
- Lunulated antbird
- Rufous-throated antbird
- White-throated antbird
- Black-capped antwren
- Yellow-breasted antwren
- Spot-backed antwren
- Dugand's antwren
- Large-billed antwren
- Roraiman antwren
- Rufous-winged antwren
- Caatinga antwren
- Todd's antwren
- Spot-tailed antwren
- Spotted antbird
- Spot-backed antbird
- Dot-backed antbird
- Imeri warbling antbird
- Yellow-browed antbird
- Rondonia warbling antbird
- Peruvian warbling antbird
- Spix's warbling antbird
- Yellow-breasted warbling antbird
- Band-tailed antbird
- Black-chinned antbird
- Spot-backed antshrike
- Large-tailed antshrike
- Tufted antshrike
- Pearly antshrike
- Dot-winged antwren
- Black-throated antbird
- Stub-tailed antbird
- Northern chestnut-tailed antbird
- Yapacana antbird
- Chestnut-backed antbird
- Ferruginous-backed antbird
- Sooty antbird
- Goeldi's antbird
- Southern chestnut-tailed antbird
- Plumbeous antbird
- Blue-lored antbird
- Dull-mantled antbird
- White-bellied antbird
- White-bibbed antbird
- White-shouldered antbird
- Esmeraldas antbird
- Grey-bellied antbird
- Squamate antbird
- White-browed antbird
- White-lined antbird
- Ash-breasted antbird
- Black-faced antbird
- Black-and-white antbird
- Stripe-backed antbird
- Yellow-throated antwren
- Leaden antwren
- White-flanked antwren
- Plain-winged antwren
- Pygmy antwren
- Cherrie's antwren
- Yungas antwren
- Star-throated antwren
- Rufous-bellied antwren
- Plain-throated antwren
- Moustached antwren
- Ihering's antwren
- Stripe-chested antwren
- Long-winged antwren
- Grey antwren
- Amazonian streaked antwren
- Pacific antwren
- Slaty antwren
- Sclater's antwren
- Rio Suno antwren
- Guianan streaked antwren
- Black bushbird
- Black-headed antbird
- Ocellated antbird
- Pale-faced bare-eye
- Reddish-winged bare-eye
- Black-spotted bare-eye
- White-plumed antbird
- Spot-winged antshrike
- White-backed fire-eye
- White-shouldered fire-eye
- Harlequin antbird
- Chestnut-crested antbird
- Hairy-crested antbird
- Collared antshrike
- Black-crested antshrike
- Silvery-cheeked antshrike
- Glossy antshrike
- Black-backed antshrike
- Band-tailed antshrike
- Brownish-headed antbird
- Caura antbird
- Humaita antbird
- Spot-winged antbird
- Rufous-faced antbird
- Roraiman antbird
- Slate-colored antbird
- Silvered antbird
- Great antshrike
- Rufous-rumped antwren
- Chestnut-shouldered antwren
- Streak-capped antwren
- Ash-winged antwren
- Russet antshrike
- Dusky-throated antshrike
- Cinereous antshrike
- Saturnine antshrike
- Bluish-slate antshrike
- White-shouldered antshrike
- Amazonian antshrike
- Sooretama slaty antshrike
- Upland antshrike
- Black-crowned antshrike
- Black-hooded antshrike
- Variable antshrike
- Acre antshrike
- Barred antshrike
- Streak-backed antshrike
- Bar-crested antshrike
- Mouse-colored antshrike
- Black antshrike
- Chestnut-backed antshrike
- Planalto slaty antshrike
- Northern slaty antshrike
- Rufous-capped antshrike
- Plain-winged antshrike
- Natterer's slaty antshrike
- Bolivian slaty antshrike
- Lined antshrike
- Rufous-winged antshrike
- Uniform antshrike
- Chapman's antshrike
- Scale-backed antbird
- Xingu antbird

=== Formicariidae ===
Antthrushes

- Short-tailed antthrush
- Cryptic antthrush
- Barred antthrush
- Striated antthrush
- Rufous-tailed antthrush
- Schwartz's antthrush
- Black-faced antthrush
- Rufous-capped antthrush
- Black-headed antthrush
- Rufous-fronted antthrush
- Rufous-breasted antthrush

=== Grallariidae ===
Antpittas

- White-throated antpitta
- Stripe-headed antpitta
- Bay antpitta
- Pale-billed antpitta
- Ochre-striped antpitta
- Elusive antpitta
- Red-and-white antpitta
- Rufous-faced antpitta
- Yellow-breasted antpitta
- Grey-naped antpitta
- Scaled antpitta
- Plain-backed antpitta
- White-bellied antpitta
- Chestnut-naped antpitta
- Rusty-tinged antpitta
- Tawny antpitta
- Chestnut-crowned antpitta
- Bicolored antpitta
- Rufous antpitta
- Undulated antpitta
- Variegated antpitta
- Rusty-breasted antpitta
- Crescent-faced antpitta
- Slaty-crowned antpitta
- Amazonian antpitta
- Thicket antpitta
- White-lored antpitta
- Spotted antpitta
- Speckle-breasted antpitta
- Streak-chested antpitta
- Thrush-like antpitta
- Tepui antpitta

=== Conopophagidae ===
Gnateaters

- Slaty gnateater
- Chestnut-belted gnateater
- Chestnut-crowned gnateater
- Rufous gnateater
- Black-bellied gnateater
- Black-cheeked gnateater
- Ash-throated gnateater
- Hooded gnateater
- Black-crowned antpitta

=== Rhinocryptidae ===
Tapaculos

- Ocellated tapaculo
- White-breasted tapaculo
- Ochre-flanked tapaculo
- Rusty-belted tapaculo
- Slaty bristlefront
- Ash-colored tapaculo
- Spotted bamboowren
- Chestnut-throated huet-huet
- Moustached turca
- Black-throated huet-huet
- Crested gallito
- White-throated tapaculo
- Chucao tapaculo
- Tschudi's tapaculo
- Ancash tapaculo
- Neblina tapaculo
- Silvery-fronted tapaculo
- Northern white-crowned tapaculo
- Bolivian white-crowned tapaculo
- Caracas tapaculo
- Chocó tapaculo
- Rufous-vented tapaculo
- Dusky tapaculo
- Pale-bellied tapaculo
- Brown-rumped tapaculo
- Blackish tapaculo
- Large-footed tapaculo
- Magellanic tapaculo
- Mérida tapaculo
- Long-tailed tapaculo
- Paramo tapaculo
- Planalto tapaculo
- Chusquea tapaculo
- Trilling tapaculo
- Santa Marta tapaculo
- Diademed tapaculo
- Puna tapaculo
- Mouse-coloured tapaculo
- Spillmann's tapaculo
- Stiles's tapaculo
- White-browed tapaculo
- Unicolored tapaculo
- Vilcabamba tapaculo
- Nariño tapaculo
- Zimmer's tapaculo
- Sandy gallito

=== Melanopareiidae ===
Crescentchests

- Elegant crescentchest
- Marañón crescentchest
- Olive-crowned crescentchest
- Collared crescentchest

=== Tyrannidae ===
Tyrant flycatchers

- Great shrike-tyrant
- Grey-bellied shrike-tyrant
- Black-billed shrike-tyrant
- Lesser shrike-tyrant
- Agile tit-tyrant
- Unstreaked tit-tyrant
- Yellow-billed tit-tyrant
- Black-crested tit-tyrant
- Tufted tit-tyrant
- Pied-crested tit-tyrant
- White-headed marsh tyrant
- Pale-eyed pygmy tyrant
- White-eyed attila
- Cinnamon attila
- Citron-bellied attila
- Rufous-tailed attila
- Grey-hooded attila
- Bright-rumped attila
- Northern beardless tyrannulet
- Southern beardless tyrannulet
- Yellow tyrannulet
- Ash-throated casiornis
- Rufous casiornis
- Red-rumped bush tyrant
- Fuscous flycatcher
- Brownish twistwing
- Long-tailed tyrant
- Patagonian tyrant
- White-ringed flycatcher
- Lemon-browed flycatcher
- Yellow-throated flycatcher
- Three-striped flycatcher
- White-throated pewee
- Cuban pewee
- Tropical pewee
- Olive-sided flycatcher
- Smoke-colored pewee
- Hispaniolan pewee
- Lesser Antillean pewee
- Dark pewee
- Blackish pewee
- Ochraceous pewee
- Jamaican pewee
- Greater pewee
- Western wood pewee
- Eastern wood pewee
- Southern antpipit
- Ringed antpipit
- Sharp-tailed grass tyrant
- Flammulated flycatcher
- White-crested elaenia
- Lesser elaenia
- Plain-crested elaenia
- Great elaenia
- Greater Antillean elaenia
- Yellow-bellied elaenia
- Mountain elaenia
- Mottle-backed elaenia
- Caribbean elaenia
- Olivaceous elaenia
- Highland elaenia
- Sierran elaenia
- Small-billed elaenia
- Brownish elaenia
- Rufous-crowned elaenia
- Large elaenia
- Slaty elaenia
- Pine flycatcher
- White-throated flycatcher
- Alder flycatcher
- Black-capped flycatcher
- Pacific-slope flycatcher
- Yellowish flycatcher
- Yellow-bellied flycatcher
- Buff-breasted flycatcher
- Hammond's flycatcher
- Least flycatcher
- American dusky flycatcher
- Cordilleran flycatcher
- Willow flycatcher
- Acadian flycatcher
- American gray flycatcher
- Crowned slaty flycatcher
- Variegated flycatcher
- Tawny-crowned pygmy tyrant
- Rufous-sided pygmy tyrant
- Black-backed water tyrant
- Masked water tyrant
- Pied water tyrant
- Streamer-tailed tyrant
- Drab-breasted bamboo tyrant
- Flammulated bamboo tyrant
- Fork-tailed tody-tyrant
- Black-throated tody-tyrant
- White-bellied tody-tyrant
- Pelzeln's tody-tyrant
- Johannes's tody-tyrant
- Boat-billed tody-tyrant
- Pearly-vented tody-tyrant
- Zimmer's tody-tyrant
- Snethlage's tody-tyrant
- Hangnest tody-tyrant
- Brown-breasted bamboo tyrant
- Eye-ringed tody-tyrant
- Buff-throated tody-tyrant
- Yungas tody-tyrant
- Stripe-necked tody-tyrant
- White-eyed tody-tyrant
- Cliff flycatcher
- Spectacled tyrant
- Pale-tipped inezia
- Plain inezia
- Amazonian inezia
- Slender-billed inezia
- White-winged black tyrant
- Blue-billed black tyrant
- Sao Francisco black tyrant
- Hudson's black tyrant
- Crested black tyrant
- Velvety black tyrant
- Riverside tyrant
- Amazonian black tyrant
- Rufous-tailed tyrant
- Jelski's black tyrant
- Cinereous tyrant
- Euler's flycatcher
- Grey-breasted flycatcher
- Piratic flycatcher
- Sepia-capped flycatcher
- Rufous-breasted flycatcher
- Slaty-capped flycatcher
- Inca flycatcher
- Andean negrito
- Austral negrito
- Long-crested pygmy tyrant
- Helmeted pygmy tyrant
- Scale-crested pygmy tyrant
- Double-banded pygmy tyrant
- Cattle tyrant
- Rufous-winged tyrannulet
- Buff-banded tyrannulet
- White-throated tyrannulet
- Sulphur-bellied tyrannulet
- White-tailed tyrannulet
- White-banded tyrannulet
- Boat-billed flycatcher
- McConnell's flycatcher
- Ochre-bellied flycatcher
- Olive-striped flycatcher
- Grey-hooded flycatcher
- Streak-necked flycatcher
- Olive tufted flycatcher
- Northern tufted flycatcher
- Short-tailed field tyrant
- Shear-tailed grey tyrant
- White-fronted ground tyrant
- White-browed ground tyrant
- Paramo ground tyrant
- Cinnamon-bellied ground tyrant
- Cinereous ground tyrant
- Ochre-naped ground tyrant
- Little ground tyrant
- Black-fronted ground tyrant
- Taczanowski's ground tyrant
- Puna ground tyrant
- Dark-faced ground tyrant
- Spot-billed ground tyrant
- Rufous-naped ground tyrant
- Puerto Rican flycatcher
- Apical flycatcher
- Sad flycatcher
- Pale-edged flycatcher
- Ash-throated flycatcher
- Great crested flycatcher
- Short-crested flycatcher
- Galapagos flycatcher
- Grenada flycatcher
- Nutting's flycatcher
- Lesser Antillean flycatcher
- Panamanian flycatcher
- Sooty-crowned flycatcher
- La Sagra's flycatcher
- Stolid flycatcher
- Swainson's flycatcher
- Dusky-capped flycatcher
- Brown-crested flycatcher
- Rufous-tailed flycatcher
- Venezuelan flycatcher
- Yucatan flycatcher
- Baird's flycatcher
- Golden-crowned flycatcher
- Golden-bellied flycatcher
- Sulphur-bellied flycatcher
- Streaked flycatcher
- Grey elaenia
- Jamaican elaenia
- Yellow-crowned elaenia
- Forest elaenia
- Foothill elaenia
- Pacific elaenia
- Greenish elaenia
- Olive-chested flycatcher
- Bran-colored flycatcher
- Flavescent flycatcher
- Unadorned flycatcher
- Orange-crested flycatcher
- Roraiman flycatcher
- White-bellied pygmy tyrant
- Black-capped pygmy tyrant
- Eared pygmy tyrant
- Short-tailed pygmy tyrant
- Smoky bush tyrant
- Rufous-bellied bush tyrant
- Streak-throated bush tyrant
- Ornate flycatcher
- Rusty-margined flycatcher
- Grey-capped flycatcher
- Dusky-chested flycatcher
- Social flycatcher
- Cinnamon neopipo
- Chocolate-vented tyrant
- Orange-banded flycatcher
- Ochraceous-breasted flycatcher
- Handsome flycatcher
- Slaty-backed chat-tyrant
- Yellow-bellied chat-tyrant
- Crowned chat-tyrant
- Brown-backed chat-tyrant
- Jelski's chat-tyrant
- White-browed chat-tyrant
- D'Orbigny's chat-tyrant
- Piura chat-tyrant
- Golden-browed chat-tyrant
- Rufous-breasted chat-tyrant
- Drab water tyrant
- Northern bentbill
- Southern bentbill
- Brown-capped tyrannulet
- White-lored tyrannulet
- Yellow-bellied tyrannulet
- Mouse-colored tyrannulet
- White-bearded flycatcher
- Rough-legged tyrannulet
- Ashy-headed tyrannulet
- Planalto tyrannulet
- Sooty-headed tyrannulet
- Grey-capped tyrannulet
- Black-capped tyrannulet
- Plumbeous-crowned tyrannulet
- Reiser's tyrannulet
- Sclater's tyrannulet
- Tawny-rumped tyrannulet
- Greenish tyrannulet
- Chapman's bristle tyrant
- Serra do Mar tyrannulet
- Panamanian tyrannulet
- Ecuadorian tyrannulet
- Restinga tyrannulet
- Black-fronted tyrannulet
- Marble-faced bristle tyrant
- Spectacled bristle tyrant
- Oustalet's tyrannulet
- Cinnamon-faced tyrannulet
- Variegated bristle tyrant
- Rufous-browed tyrannulet
- Bay-ringed tyrannulet
- Mottle-cheeked tyrannulet
- Olive-green tyrannulet
- Lesser kiskadee
- Great kiskadee
- Stub-tailed spadebill
- Golden-crowned spadebill
- Yellow-throated spadebill
- White-throated spadebill
- White-crested spadebill
- Cinnamon-crested spadebill
- White-cheeked tody-flycatcher
- Golden-winged tody-flycatcher
- Black-and-white tody-flycatcher
- Smoky-fronted tody-flycatcher
- Rusty-fronted tody-flycatcher
- Lulu's tody-flycatcher
- Ochre-faced tody-flycatcher
- Black-backed tody-flycatcher
- Rufous-crowned tody-flycatcher
- Ruddy tody-flycatcher
- Buff-cheeked tody-flycatcher
- Slaty-headed tody-flycatcher
- Southern bristle tyrant
- Rufous-webbed bush tyrant
- Grey-backed tachuri
- Grey-and-white tyrannulet
- Subtropical doradito
- Ticking doradito
- Warbling doradito
- Crested doradito
- Bronze-olive pygmy tyrant
- Rufous-headed pygmy tyrant
- Hazel-fronted pygmy tyrant
- Vermilion flycatcher
- Cinnamon flycatcher
- Dusky-tailed flatbill
- Large-headed flatbill
- Rufous-tailed flatbill
- Eye-ringed flatbill
- Fulvous-breasted flatbill
- Olivaceous flatbill
- Pacific flatbill
- Rufous mourner
- Pale-bellied mourner
- Greyish mourner
- Yellow-browed tyrant
- Black phoebe
- Eastern phoebe
- Say's phoebe
- Torrent tyrannulet
- River tyrannulet
- White-bellied tyrannulet
- Sooty tyrannulet
- White-crested tyrannulet
- Sibilant sirystes
- Greater wagtail-tyrant
- Lesser wagtail-tyrant
- Northern scrub flycatcher
- Southern scrub flycatcher
- Amazonian scrub flycatcher
- Suiriri flycatcher
- Many-coloured rush tyrant
- Black-chested tyrant
- Yellow-browed tody-flycatcher
- Common tody-flycatcher
- Spotted tody-flycatcher
- Black-headed tody-flycatcher
- Painted tody-flycatcher
- Yellow-lored tody-flycatcher
- Maracaibo tody-flycatcher
- Yellow-margined flatbill
- Yellow-breasted flatbill
- Grey-crowned flatbill
- Yellow-olive flatbill
- Orange-eyed flatbill
- Sulphury flycatcher
- Yellow-crowned tyrannulet
- White-throated kingbird
- Loggerhead kingbird
- Couch's kingbird
- Thick-billed kingbird
- Gray kingbird
- Scissor-tailed flycatcher
- Tropical kingbird
- Snowy-throated kingbird
- Fork-tailed flycatcher
- Eastern kingbird
- Western kingbird
- Cassin's kingbird
- Belted flycatcher
- Pileated flycatcher
- Grey monjita
- Black-crowned monjita
- White monjita
- Fire-eyed diucon
- Rusty-backed monjita
- Salinas monjita
- White-rumped monjita
- Guianan tyrannulet
- Choco tyrannulet
- Bolivian tyrannulet
- Red-billed tyrannulet
- Golden-faced tyrannulet
- Slender-footed tyrannulet
- Venezuelan tyrannulet
- Paltry tyrannulet
- Mishana tyrannulet
- Peruvian tyrannulet

=== Cotingidae ===
Cotingas

- Scaled fruiteater
- Red-crested cotinga
- Chestnut-crested cotinga
- Black-tipped cotinga
- Snowy cotinga
- Hooded berryeater
- Amazonian umbrellabird
- Black-faced cotinga
- Lovely cotinga
- Spangled cotinga
- Purple-breasted cotinga
- Plum-throated cotinga
- Blue cotinga
- Bare-necked fruitcrow
- Crimson fruitcrow
- Black-and-gold cotinga
- Dusky piha
- Cinnamon-vented piha
- Rose-collared piha
- Rufous piha
- Screaming piha
- Capuchinbird
- Swallow-tailed cotinga
- Guianan red cotinga
- Black-necked red cotinga
- Rufous-tailed plantcutter
- White-tipped plantcutter
- Barred fruiteater
- Golden-breasted fruiteater
- Fiery-throated fruiteater
- Handsome fruiteater
- Scarlet-breasted fruiteater
- Band-tailed fruiteater
- Orange-breasted fruiteater
- Black-chested fruiteater
- Masked fruiteater
- Green-and-black fruiteater
- Scaly-breasted fruiteater
- Red-banded fruiteater
- Purple-throated cotinga
- White bellbird
- Red-ruffed fruitcrow
- Purple-throated fruitcrow
- Andean cock-of-the-rock
- Guianan cock-of-the-rock
- Olivaceous piha
- Grey-tailed piha
- Pompadour cotinga

=== Pipridae ===
Manakins

- Helmeted manakin
- Yungas manakin
- Blue manakin
- Lance-tailed manakin
- Long-tailed manakin
- Blue-backed manakin
- White-ruffed manakin
- White-throated manakin
- White-bibbed manakin
- Orange-crested manakin
- Yellow-crested manakin
- Flame-crested manakin
- Pin-tailed manakin
- Cerulean-capped manakin
- Blue-crowned manakin
- Blue-rumped manakin
- Snow-capped manakin
- White-fronted manakin
- Orange-bellied manakin
- Golden-crowned manakin
- Club-winged manakin
- Fiery-capped manakin
- Striped manakin
- Orange-collared manakin
- White-collared manakin
- White-bearded manakin
- Golden-collared manakin
- Golden-winged manakin
- Saffron-crested tyrant-manakin
- Serra do Mar tyrant-manakin
- Pale-bellied tyrant-manakin
- Sulphur-bellied tyrant-manakin
- Crimson-hooded manakin
- Round-tailed manakin
- Scarlet-horned manakin
- Golden-headed manakin
- Band-tailed manakin
- Wire-tailed manakin
- Red-capped manakin
- White-crowned manakin
- Red-headed manakin
- Wing-barred piprites
- Grey-headed piprites
- Dwarf tyrant-manakin
- Tiny tyrant-manakin
- Black manakin
- Green manakin
- Jet manakin
- Olive manakin

=== Tityridae ===
Tityras, becards, and allies

- Dusky purpletuft
- White-browed purpletuft
- Andean laniisoma
- Brazilian laniisoma
- Cinereous mourner
- Speckled mourner
- Rose-throated becard
- Black-and-white becard
- Chestnut-crowned becard
- Cinnamon becard
- One-colored becard
- Grey-collared becard
- Black-capped becard
- Pink-throated becard
- Jamaican becard
- White-winged becard
- Cinereous becard
- Glossy-backed becard
- Crested becard
- Barred becard
- Green-backed becard
- Foothill schiffornis
- Varzea schiffornis
- Guianan schiffornis
- Russet-winged schiffornis
- Brown-winged schiffornis
- Northern schiffornis
- Greenish schiffornis
- Black-tailed tityra
- Black-crowned tityra
- Masked tityra
- White-naped xenopsaris

=== Oxyruncidae ===
Sharpbill (monotypic)

- Sharpbill

=== Onychorhynchidae ===
Royal flycatchers and allies

- Black-tailed myiobius
- Whiskered myiobius
- Sulphur-rumped myiobius
- Tawny-breasted myiobius
- Royal flycatcher
- Northern royal flycatcher
- Ruddy-tailed flycatcher

=== Menuridae ===
Lyrebirds

- Albert's lyrebird
- Superb lyrebird

=== Ptilonorhynchidae ===
Bowerbirds

- White-eared catbird
- Green catbird
- Spotted catbird
- Golden-fronted bowerbird
- Vogelkop bowerbird
- MacGregor's bowerbird
- Streaked bowerbird
- Archbold's bowerbird
- Fawn-breasted bowerbird
- Western bowerbird
- Yellow-breasted bowerbird
- Spotted bowerbird
- Great bowerbird
- Golden bowerbird
- Satin bowerbird
- Tooth-billed bowerbird
- Flame bowerbird
- Regent bowerbird

=== Climacteridae ===
Australasian treecreepers

- White-browed treecreeper
- Red-browed treecreeper
- Black-tailed treecreeper
- Brown treecreeper
- Rufous treecreeper
- White-throated treecreeper
- Papuan treecreeper

=== Maluridae ===
Australasian wrens

- Grey grasswren
- Eyrean grasswren
- Black grasswren
- Thick-billed grasswren
- Dusky grasswren
- Striated grasswren
- Western grasswren
- Broad-billed fairywren
- Orange-crowned fairywren
- White-shouldered fairywren
- Lovely fairywren
- Purple-backed fairywren
- Purple-crowned fairywren
- Superb fairywren
- Emperor fairywren
- Red-winged fairywren
- Variegated fairywren
- White-winged fairywren
- Red-backed fairywren
- Blue-breasted fairywren
- Splendid fairywren
- Wallace's fairywren
- Southern emu-wren
- Rufous-crowned emu-wren

=== Meliphagidae ===
Honeyeaters

- Spiny-cheeked honeyeater
- Western spinebill
- Eastern spinebill
- Red wattlebird
- Little wattlebird
- Western wattlebird
- Yellow wattlebird
- New Zealand bellbird
- Gibberbird
- Black honeyeater
- Banded honeyeater
- Pied honeyeater
- Rufous-banded honeyeater
- Rufous-throated honeyeater
- Grey honeyeater
- Blue-faced honeyeater
- White-fronted chat
- Orange chat
- Yellow chat
- Crimson chat
- Wattled honeyeater
- Green-backed honeyeater
- Painted honeyeater
- Guadalcanal honeyeater
- Giant honeyeater
- Yellow-faced honeyeater
- Purple-gaped honeyeater
- Mangrove honeyeater
- Yellow-tinted honeyeater
- Yellow-throated honeyeater
- Yellow honeyeater
- Bridled honeyeater
- Fuscous honeyeater
- Eungella honeyeater
- Grey-headed honeyeater
- White-eared honeyeater
- Yellow-tufted honeyeater
- Obscure honeyeater
- Yellow-plumed honeyeater
- White-plumed honeyeater
- Grey-fronted honeyeater
- Black-throated honeyeater
- White-gaped honeyeater
- Varied honeyeater
- Singing honeyeater
- Silver-eared honeyeater
- Olive honeyeater
- Buru honeyeater
- Flame-eared honeyeater
- Grey-eared honeyeater
- Brown honeyeater
- Indonesian honeyeater
- Scaly-crowned honeyeater
- Seram honeyeater
- Black-necklaced honeyeater
- Scaly-breasted honeyeater
- Yellow-throated miner
- Noisy miner
- Bell miner
- Belford's melidectes
- Huon melidectes
- Sooty melidectes
- Vogelkop melidectes
- Short-bearded melidectes
- Cinnamon-browed melidectes
- Yellow-browed melidectes
- Makira honeyeater
- Ornate melidectes
- Long-billed honeyeater
- White-lined honeyeater
- Scrub honeyeater
- Mimic honeyeater
- Puff-backed honeyeater
- Yellow-gaped honeyeater
- Graceful honeyeater
- Lewin's honeyeater
- Mottle-breasted honeyeater
- Forest honeyeater
- Yellow-spotted honeyeater
- Mountain honeyeater
- Streak-breasted honeyeater
- Spangled honeyeater
- Common smoky honeyeater
- Arfak honeyeater
- Black-headed honeyeater
- White-throated honeyeater
- Brown-headed honeyeater
- Black-chinned honeyeater
- White-naped honeyeater
- Strong-billed honeyeater
- White-streaked friarbird
- Tagula honeyeater
- Dark-eared myza
- White-eared myza
- Mountain myzomela
- Drab myzomela
- Banda myzomela
- New Caledonian myzomela
- Cardinal myzomela
- Sulawesi myzomela
- Red myzomela
- Sumba myzomela
- Crimson-rumped myzomela
- Ruby-throated myzomela
- Red-headed myzomela
- Black-bellied myzomela
- Sulphur-breasted myzomela
- Crimson-hooded myzomela
- Red-capped myzomela
- Black-headed myzomela
- Papuan black myzomela
- Dusky myzomela
- Bismarck black myzomela
- New Ireland myzomela
- Red-collared myzomela
- Micronesian myzomela
- Scarlet myzomela
- Sclater's myzomela
- Sooty myzomela
- Black-breasted myzomela
- Wakolo myzomela
- Orange-cheeked honeyeater
- Manus friarbird
- Silver-crowned friarbird
- Brass's friarbird
- Helmeted friarbird
- Little friarbird
- New Britain friarbird
- Noisy friarbird
- New Caledonian friarbird
- New Ireland friarbird
- Timor friarbird
- Meyer's friarbird
- Black-faced friarbird
- Papuan friarbird
- Seram friarbird
- White-fronted honeyeater
- Tawny-crowned honeyeater
- White-cheeked honeyeater
- White-bellied honeyeater
- New Holland honeyeater
- Crescent honeyeater
- Barred honeyeater
- Striped honeyeater
- Tui
- Rufous-sided honeyeater
- Rufous-backed honeyeater
- Mayr's honeyeater
- Yellowish-streaked honeyeater
- Grey-streaked honeyeater
- Leaden honeyeater
- Marbled honeyeater
- Plain honeyeater
- Streak-headed honeyeater
- Bar-breasted honeyeater
- Brown-backed honeyeater
- Bougainville honeyeater
- Olive straightbill
- Tawny straightbill
- White-streaked honeyeater
- Tawny-breasted honeyeater
- Macleay's honeyeater
- Spotted honeyeater
- Kadavu honeyeater

=== Dasyornithidae ===
Bristlebirds

- Rufous bristlebird

=== Pardalotidae ===
Pardalotes

- Spotted pardalote
- Red-browed pardalote
- Striated pardalote

=== Acanthizidae ===
Australasian warblers

- Inland thornbill
- Yellow-rumped thornbill
- Tasmanian thornbill
- Western thornbill
- Slender-billed thornbill
- Mountain thornbill
- Striated thornbill
- New Guinea thornbill
- Yellow thornbill
- Brown thornbill
- Buff-rumped thornbill
- Slaty-backed thornbill
- Chestnut-rumped thornbill
- Scrubtit
- Grey-green scrubwren
- Bicoloured mouse-warbler
- Papuan scrubwren
- Buff-faced scrubwren
- Vogelkop scrubwren
- Pale-billed scrubwren
- Southern whiteface
- Banded whiteface
- Rufous fieldwren
- Striated fieldwren
- Speckled warbler
- Chatham gerygone
- Green-backed gerygone
- Yellow-bellied gerygone
- Ashy gerygone
- Rufous-sided gerygone
- Fan-tailed gerygone
- Western gerygone
- Grey warbler
- Plain gerygone
- Mangrove gerygone
- Large-billed gerygone
- Norfolk gerygone
- Brown gerygone
- White-throated gerygone
- Fairy gerygone
- Brown-breasted gerygone
- Golden-bellied gerygone
- Dusky gerygone
- Shy heathwren
- Chestnut-rumped heathwren
- Yellow-throated scrubwren
- Fernwren
- Rusty mouse-warbler
- Mountain mouse-warbler
- Rockwarbler
- Goldenface
- Pilotbird
- Redthroat
- Tropical scrubwren
- White-browed scrubwren
- Tasmanian scrubwren
- Atherton scrubwren
- Large-billed scrubwren
- Large scrubwren
- Perplexing scrubwren
- Weebill

=== Pomatostomidae ===
Australasian babblers

- Papuan babbler
- Hall's babbler
- Chestnut-crowned babbler
- White-browed babbler
- Grey-crowned babbler

=== Orthonychidae ===
Logrunners

- Papuan logrunner
- Chowchilla
- Australian logrunner

=== Cnemophilidae ===
Satinbirds

- Loria's satinbird
- Crested satinbird
- Yellow-breasted satinbird

=== Melanocharitidae ===
Berrypeckers, longbills

- Obscure berrypecker
- Spotted berrypecker
- Mid-mountain berrypecker
- Black berrypecker
- Streaked berrypecker
- Fan-tailed berrypecker
- Pygmy longbill
- Dwarf longbill
- Yellow-bellied longbill
- Slaty-headed longbill

=== Paramythiidae ===
Painted berrypeckers

- Tit berrypecker
- Eastern crested berrypecker
- Western crested berrypecker

=== Callaeidae ===
New Zealand wattlebirds

- North Island kōkako
- South Island saddleback

=== Psophodidae ===
Whipbirds

- Papuan whipbird
- Chirruping wedgebill
- Western whipbird
- Chiming wedgebill
- Eastern whipbird

=== Cinclosomatidae ===
Jewel-babblers, quail-thrushes

- Painted quail-thrush
- Nullarbor quail-thrush
- Chestnut-breasted quail-thrush
- Chestnut quail-thrush
- Cinnamon quail-thrush
- Western quail-thrush
- Spotted quail-thrush
- Blue jewel-babbler
- Chestnut-backed jewel-babbler
- Brown-headed jewel-babbler
- Spotted jewel-babbler

=== Platysteiridae ===
Wattle-eyes, batises

- Cape batis
- Dark batis
- Ruwenzori batis
- Western black-headed batis
- Woodward's batis
- Ituri batis
- Margaret's batis
- Black-headed batis
- Angolan batis
- Forest batis
- Chinspot batis
- West African batis
- Grey-headed batis
- Pygmy batis
- Fernando Po batis
- Pririt batis
- Senegal batis
- Pale batis
- White-tailed shrike
- Red-cheeked wattle-eye
- Chestnut wattle-eye
- Black-necked wattle-eye
- Yellow-bellied wattle-eye
- Brown-throated wattle-eye
- Jameson's wattle-eye
- Black-throated wattle-eye
- White-spotted wattle-eye

=== Malaconotidae ===
Bushshrikes

- Olive bushshrike
- Pink-footed puffback
- Black-backed puffback
- Northern puffback
- Pringle's puffback
- Sabine's puffback
- Red-eyed puffback
- Ethiopian boubou
- Crimson-breasted shrike
- Yellow-breasted boubou
- Yellow-crowned gonolek
- Swamp boubou
- Black-headed gonolek
- Southern boubou
- Fülleborn's boubou
- Slate-colored boubou
- Lowland sooty boubou
- Lühder's bushshrike
- Mountain sooty boubou
- Red-naped bushshrike
- Turati's boubou
- Grey-headed bushshrike
- Fiery-breasted bushshrike
- Brubru
- Rosy-patched bushshrike
- Brown-crowned tchagra
- Three-streaked tchagra
- Marsh tchagra
- Black-crowned tchagra
- Southern tchagra
- Bocage's bushshrike
- Doherty's bushshrike
- Many-colored bushshrike
- Black-fronted bushshrike
- Orange-breasted bushshrike
- Gorgeous bushshrike
- Bokmakierie

=== Machaerirhynchidae ===
Boatbills

- Yellow-breasted boatbill
- Black-breasted boatbill

=== Vangidae ===
Vangas and allies

- White-headed vanga
- Black-and-white shrike-flycatcher
- Red-tailed vanga
- Blue vanga
- Sickle-billed vanga
- Black-winged flycatcher-shrike
- Bar-winged flycatcher-shrike
- Nuthatch vanga
- Chabert vanga
- African shrike-flycatcher
- Crossley's vanga
- Dark newtonia
- Archbold's newtonia
- Common newtonia
- Rufous-winged philentoma
- White-crested helmetshrike
- Grey-crested helmetshrike
- Retz's helmetshrike
- Rufous-bellied helmetshrike
- Chestnut-fronted helmetshrike
- Ward's flycatcher
- Rufous vanga
- Sri Lanka woodshrike
- Common woodshrike
- Malabar woodshrike
- Large woodshrike
- Tylas vanga
- Hook-billed vanga
- Lafresnaye's vanga

=== Artamidae ===
Woodswallows, butcherbirds, and allies

- Black-faced woodswallow
- Dusky woodswallow
- Ashy woodswallow
- White-backed woodswallow
- White-breasted woodswallow
- Great woodswallow
- Fiji woodswallow
- Little woodswallow
- Ivory-backed woodswallow
- Masked woodswallow
- White-browed woodswallow
- Hooded butcherbird
- Black-backed butcherbird
- Pied butcherbird
- Grey butcherbird
- Australian magpie
- Black butcherbird
- Lowland peltops
- Mountain peltops
- Black currawong
- Pied currawong
- Grey currawong

=== Rhagologidae ===
Mottled berryhunter (monotypic)

- Mottled berryhunter

=== Aegithinidae ===
Ioras

- Great iora
- Marshall's iora
- Common iora

=== Campephagidae ===
Cuckooshrikes

- Black cuckooshrike
- Petit's cuckooshrike
- Red-shouldered cuckooshrike
- Purple-throated cuckooshrike
- Golden cuckooshrike
- Pygmy cuckooshrike
- Moluccan cuckooshrike
- Blue cuckooshrike
- Boyer's cuckooshrike
- Stout-billed cuckooshrike
- Grey cuckooshrike
- South Melanesian cuckooshrike
- Madagascan cuckooshrike
- Lesser cuckooshrike
- Javan cuckooshrike
- Sunda cuckooshrike
- White-rumped cuckooshrike
- Barred cuckooshrike
- Hooded cuckooshrike
- Large cuckooshrike
- Ground cuckooshrike
- Black-headed cuckooshrike
- Black-winged cuckooshrike
- Black-faced cuckooshrike
- White-bellied cuckooshrike
- White-breasted cuckooshrike
- Wallacean cuckooshrike
- Indochinese cuckooshrike
- Slaty cuckooshrike
- Bar-bellied cuckooshrike
- Cerulean cuckooshrike
- Pale cicadabird
- Blackish cuckooshrike
- Kai cicadabird
- Pale-shouldered cicadabird
- Black-shouldered cicadabird
- Black cicadabird
- Black-bellied cuckooshrike
- Sulawesi cicadabird
- Halmahera cuckooshrike
- Grey-headed cuckooshrike
- Sula cicadabird
- Slender-billed cicadabird
- Black-browed triller
- Rufous-bellied triller
- Varied triller
- Long-tailed triller
- White-rumped triller
- Polynesian triller
- Black-and-white triller
- White-browed triller
- Pied triller
- White-shouldered triller
- White-winged triller
- Short-billed minivet
- Swinhoe's minivet
- Small minivet
- Ashy minivet
- White-bellied minivet
- Long-tailed minivet
- Orange minivet
- Little minivet
- Sunda minivet
- Rosy minivet
- Grey-chinned minivet
- Ryukyu minivet

=== Mohouidae ===
Whiteheads

- Whitehead
- Pipipi

=== Neosittidae ===
Sittellas

- Varied sittella
- Black sittella
- Papuan sittella

=== Eulacestomatidae ===
Ploughbill (monotypic)

- Wattled ploughbill

=== Oreoicidae ===
Australo-Papuan bellbirds

- Rufous-naped bellbird
- Crested bellbird
- Piping bellbird

=== Falcunculidae ===
Shriketits

- Eastern shriketit
- Western shriketit
- Northern shriketit

=== Pachycephalidae ===
Whistlers and allies

- Grey shrikethrush
- Little shrikethrush
- Sooty shrikethrush
- Sandstone shrikethrush
- Maroon-backed whistler
- Black pitohui
- Green-backed whistler
- Wallacean whistler
- Golden-backed whistler
- New Caledonian whistler
- Samoan whistler
- Drab whistler
- Mangrove whistler
- White-vented whistler
- Rusty whistler
- Bornean whistler
- Hooded whistler
- Gilbert's whistler
- White-breasted whistler
- White-bellied whistler
- Lorentz's whistler
- Mangrove golden whistler
- Vogelkop whistler
- Brown-backed whistler
- Black-headed whistler
- Bare-throated whistler
- Olive whistler
- Fawn-breasted whistler
- Australian golden whistler
- Island whistler
- Yellow-bellied whistler
- Rufous whistler
- Regent whistler
- Grey whistler
- Sclater's whistler
- Sulphur-vented whistler
- Morningbird
- Rusty pitohui
- White-bellied pitohui

=== Vireonidae ===
Vireos and allies

- Rufous-browed peppershrike
- Black-billed peppershrike
- White-bellied erpornis
- Grey-eyed greenlet
- Brown-headed greenlet
- Scrub greenlet
- Olivaceous greenlet
- Ashy-headed greenlet
- Rufous-crowned greenlet
- Tepui vireo
- Grey-chested greenlet
- Lemon-chested greenlet
- Golden-fronted greenlet
- Lesser greenlet
- Dusky-capped greenlet
- Buff-cheeked greenlet
- Rufous-naped greenlet
- Trilling shrike-babbler
- White-browed shrike-babbler
- Pied shrike-babbler
- Black-eared shrike-babbler
- Black-headed shrike-babbler
- Green shrike-babbler
- Tawny-crowned greenlet
- Black-whiskered vireo
- Cozumel vireo
- Slaty vireo
- Yellow-winged vireo
- Cassin's vireo
- Thick-billed vireo
- Yellow-throated vireo
- Yellow-green vireo
- Warbling vireo
- White-eyed vireo
- Cuban vireo
- Hutton's vireo
- Golden vireo
- Puerto Rican vireo
- Brown-capped vireo
- Yucatan vireo
- Jamaican vireo
- Flat-billed vireo
- Dwarf vireo
- Red-eyed vireo
- Mangrove vireo
- Philadelphia vireo
- Plumbeous vireo
- Blue-headed vireo
- Gray vireo
- Yellow-browed shrike-vireo
- Slaty-capped shrike-vireo
- Chestnut-sided shrike-vireo
- Green shrike-vireo

=== Oriolidae ===
Figbirds and Old World orioles

- White-lored oriole
- African golden oriole
- Black-eared oriole
- Western oriole
- Black-naped oriole
- Green-headed oriole
- Green oriole
- Grey-collared oriole
- Black oriole
- Black-headed oriole
- Olive-brown oriole
- Ethiopian oriole
- Black-winged oriole
- Eurasian golden oriole
- Mountain oriole
- Dusky-brown oriole
- Olive-backed oriole
- Philippine oriole
- Brown oriole
- Slender-billed oriole
- Maroon oriole
- Dark-throated oriole
- Black-hooded oriole
- Hooded pitohui
- Northern variable pitohui
- Southern variable pitohui
- Wetar figbird
- Australasian figbird
- Green figbird

=== Dicruridae ===
Drongos

- Fork-tailed drongo
- Bronzed drongo
- Crow-billed drongo
- Shining drongo
- Balicassiao
- Spangled drongo
- White-bellied drongo
- Wallacean drongo
- Crested drongo
- Hair-crested drongo
- Ashy drongo
- Square-tailed drongo
- Black drongo
- Sulawesi drongo
- Greater racket-tailed drongo
- Lesser racket-tailed drongo

=== Rhipiduridae ===
Fantails

- Drongo fantail
- White-throated fantail
- Friendly fantail
- Black fantail
- White-browed fantail
- Dimorphic fantail
- Blue-headed fantail
- Bismarck fantail
- Streak-breasted fantail
- Brown-capped fantail
- Brown fantail
- White-bellied fantail
- New Zealand fantail
- Chestnut-bellied fantail
- Malaysian pied fantail
- Pohnpei fantail
- Palau fantail
- Willie wagtail
- White-bellied thicket fantail
- Black thicket fantail
- Samoan fantail
- Black-and-cinnamon fantail
- Spotted fantail
- Mangrove fantail
- Rufous-tailed fantail
- Rennell fantail
- Rufous-backed fantail
- Rufous fantail
- Northern fantail
- Mindanao blue fantail
- Tawny-backed fantail
- Rusty-bellied fantail
- Sooty thicket fantail
- Streaked fantail

=== Monarchidae ===
Monarchs

- Ochre-collared monarch
- Pied monarch
- Frill-necked monarch
- Frilled monarch
- Golden monarch
- White-eared monarch
- White-naped monarch
- Southern shrikebill
- Fiji shrikebill
- Torrent-lark
- Magpie-lark
- Black-naped monarch
- Pale-blue monarch
- Slaty monarch
- Chestnut-bellied monarch
- Loetoe monarch
- Island monarch
- Bougainville monarch
- Black-winged monarch
- Black-faced monarch
- White-capped monarch
- White-collared monarch
- Shining flycatcher
- Azure-crested flycatcher
- Melanesian flycatcher
- Satin flycatcher
- Palau flycatcher
- Steel-blue flycatcher
- Moluccan flycatcher
- Velvet flycatcher
- Restless flycatcher
- Oceanic flycatcher
- Pohnpei flycatcher
- Leaden flycatcher
- Broad-billed flycatcher
- Vanikoro flycatcher
- Buff-bellied monarch
- Black monarch
- Solomons pied monarch
- Spot-winged monarch
- Black-tipped monarch
- Hooded monarch
- Black-bibbed monarch
- Rufous monarch
- Spectacled monarch
- Black-tailed monarch
- São Tomé paradise flycatcher
- Mascarene paradise flycatcher
- Rufous paradise flycatcher
- Blue paradise flycatcher
- Malagasy paradise flycatcher
- Indian paradise flycatcher
- Red-bellied paradise flycatcher
- Rufous-vented paradise flycatcher
- African paradise flycatcher
- Blue-mantled crested flycatcher
- Blue-headed crested flycatcher

=== Laniidae ===
Shrikes

- Yellow-billed shrike
- Southern white-crowned shrike
- Northern white-crowned shrike
- Bull-headed shrike
- Long-tailed fiscal
- Southern fiscal
- Red-backed shrike
- Burmese shrike
- Brown shrike
- Taita fiscal
- Great grey shrike
- Grey-backed fiscal
- Emin's shrike
- Isabelline shrike
- Loggerhead shrike
- Mackinnon's shrike
- Uhehe fiscal
- Lesser grey shrike
- Masked shrike
- Long-tailed shrike
- Woodchat shrike
- Somali fiscal
- Souza's shrike
- Chinese grey shrike
- Grey-backed shrike
- Tiger shrike
- Bay-backed shrike
- Magpie shrike

=== Corvidae ===
Crows, jays, and allies

- Western scrub jay
- Transvolcanic jay
- Unicolored jay
- Mexican jay
- Black-throated magpie-jay
- White-throated magpie-jay
- Common green magpie
- Indochinese green magpie
- Bornean green magpie
- White-necked raven
- Pied crow
- Little crow
- American crow
- Cape crow
- Northwestern crow
- Common raven
- Carrion crow
- Australian raven
- Thick-billed raven
- Chihuahuan raven
- Daurian jackdaw
- Somali crow
- Slender-billed crow
- Rook
- Tamaulipas crow
- Eastern jungle crow
- Jungle crow
- Bougainville crow
- Little raven
- Western jackdaw
- New Caledonian crow
- Cuban crow
- Torresian crow
- Fish crow
- Fan-tailed raven
- Brown-necked raven
- Sinaloa crow
- House crow
- Forest raven
- Grey crow
- Piping crow
- White-billed crow
- Racket-tailed treepie
- Blue jay
- Steller's jay
- Black-chested jay
- Purplish-backed jay
- Cayenne jay
- Plush-crested jay
- Curl-crested jay
- Purplish jay
- White-naped jay
- Azure-naped jay
- Bushy-crested jay
- White-tailed jay
- San Blas jay
- Violaceous jay
- Green jay
- Yucatan jay
- Silvery-throated jay
- Black-collared jay
- Azure-hooded jay
- Black-throated jay
- Turquoise jay
- Azure-winged magpie
- Grey treepie
- Collared treepie
- White-bellied treepie
- Sumatran treepie
- Rufous treepie
- Eurasian jay
- Black-headed jay
- Spotted nutcracker
- Clark's nutcracker
- Gray jay
- Siberian jay
- Eurasian magpie
- Henderson's ground jay
- Pander's ground jay
- Pleske's ground jay
- Brown jay
- Piapiac
- Alpine chough
- Red-billed chough
- Ratchet-tailed treepie
- Taiwan blue magpie
- Red-billed blue magpie
- Yellow-billed blue magpie
- White-winged magpie

=== Corcoracidae ===
Australian mudnesters

- White-winged chough
- Apostlebird

=== Melampittidae ===
Melampittas

- Greater melampitta
- Lesser melampitta

=== Ifritidae ===
Ifrit (monotypic)

- Blue-capped ifrit

=== Paradisaeidae ===
Birds-of-paradise

- Ribbon-tailed astrapia
- Arfak astrapia
- Huon astrapia
- Splendid astrapia
- Princess Stephanie's astrapia
- Magnificent bird-of-paradise
- King bird-of-paradise
- Pale-billed sicklebill
- Black-billed sicklebill
- Brown sicklebill
- Superb bird-of-paradise
- Paradise-crow
- Glossy-mantled manucode
- Crinkle-collared manucode
- Curl-crested manucode
- Jobi manucode
- Trumpet manucode
- Short-tailed paradigalla
- Greater bird-of-paradise
- Lesser bird-of-paradise
- Raggiana bird-of-paradise
- Queen Carola's parotia
- Eastern parotia
- Lawes's parotia
- Western parotia
- King of Saxony bird-of-paradise
- Growling riflebird
- Magnificent riflebird
- Paradise riflebird
- Victoria's riflebird
- Twelve-wired bird-of-paradise

=== Petroicidae ===
Australasian robins

- Lesser ground robin
- Greater ground robin
- Southern scrub robin
- Northern scrub robin
- Eastern yellow robin
- Yellow-bellied flyrobin
- White-breasted robin
- Western yellow robin
- Banded yellow robin
- Mangrove robin
- Garnet robin
- Ashy robin
- Hooded robin
- Dusky robin
- Jacky winter
- Lemon-bellied flyrobin
- Olive flyrobin
- Yellow-legged flyrobin
- Canary flyrobin
- Torrent flyrobin
- Green-backed robin
- White-eyed robin
- White-rumped robin
- Smoky robin
- Slaty robin
- White-winged robin
- South Island robin
- Mountain robin
- Scarlet robin
- Red-capped robin
- Tomtit
- Norfolk robin
- Flame robin
- Pink robin
- Rose robin
- Black-throated robin
- Black-chinned robin
- Buff-sided robin
- Black-sided robin
- White-browed robin
- Pale-yellow robin
- White-faced robin

=== Chaetopidae ===
Rockjumpers

- Drakensberg rockjumper
- Cape rockjumper

=== Bombycillidae ===
Waxwings

- Cedar waxwing
- Bohemian waxwing

=== Ptilogonatidae ===
Silky-flycatchers

- Phainopepla
- Black-and-yellow phainoptila
- Long-tailed silky-flycatcher
- Grey silky-flycatcher

=== Hypocoliidae ===
Hypocolius (monotypic)

- Grey hypocolius

=== Dulidae ===
Palmchat (monotypic)

- Palmchat

=== Hylocitreidae ===
Hylocitrea (monotypic)

- Hylocitrea

=== Stenostiridae ===
Fairy flycatchers

- Yellow-bellied fantail
- Grey-headed canary-flycatcher
- Citrine canary-flycatcher
- White-tailed blue flycatcher
- White-bellied crested flycatcher
- White-tailed crested flycatcher
- African blue flycatcher
- Dusky crested flycatcher
- Fairy flycatcher

=== Paridae ===
Tits and chickadees

- Black-crested titmouse
- Tufted titmouse
- Oak titmouse
- Juniper titmouse
- Bridled titmouse
- Fire-capped tit
- Eurasian blue tit
- Azure tit
- Crested tit
- Grey crested tit
- Yellow tit
- Yellow-cheeked tit
- Himalayan black-lored tit
- Grey tit
- White-bellied tit
- Ashy tit
- Stripe-breasted tit
- Red-throated tit
- Dusky tit
- Miombo tit
- White-winged black tit
- White-backed black tit
- Southern black tit
- Rufous-bellied tit
- Acacia tit
- Sultan tit
- Elegant tit
- Yellow-bellied tit
- Great tit
- Green-backed tit
- Coal tit
- Rufous-vented tit
- Rufous-naped tit
- Black-capped chickadee
- Carolina chickadee
- Grey-headed chickadee
- Père David's tit
- Mountain chickadee
- Boreal chickadee
- Black-bibbed tit
- Sombre tit
- Willow tit
- Marsh tit
- Chestnut-backed chickadee
- Mexican chickadee
- White-browed tit
- Ground tit
- Varied tit
- Yellow-browed tit

=== Remizidae ===
Penduline tits

- Grey penduline tit
- Forest penduline tit
- Cape penduline tit
- Mouse-coloured penduline tit
- Yellow penduline tit
- Sennar penduline tit
- Verdin
- Chinese penduline tit
- White-crowned penduline tit
- Black-headed penduline tit
- Eurasian penduline tit

=== Nicatoridae ===
Nicators

- Western nicator
- Eastern nicator
- Yellow-throated nicator

=== Panuridae ===
Bearded reedling (monotypic)

- Bearded reedling

=== Alaudidae ===
Larks

- Greater hoopoe-lark
- Lesser hoopoe-lark
- Eurasian skylark
- Oriental skylark
- Japanese skylark
- Bar-tailed lark
- Desert lark
- Gray's lark
- Rufous-tailed lark
- Hume's short-toed lark
- Greater short-toed lark
- Asian short-toed lark
- Red-capped lark
- Sand lark
- Lesser short-toed lark
- Somali short-toed lark
- Karoo lark
- Barlow's lark
- Short-clawed lark
- Cape long-billed lark
- Dune lark
- Eastern long-billed lark
- Karoo long-billed lark
- Spike-heeled lark
- Dunn's lark
- Stark's lark
- Horned lark
- Temminck's lark
- Black-eared sparrow-lark
- Ashy-crowned sparrow-lark
- Fischer's sparrow-lark
- Chestnut-backed sparrow-lark
- Black-crowned sparrow-lark
- Chestnut-headed sparrow-lark
- Grey-backed sparrow-lark
- Crested lark
- Sykes's lark
- Large-billed lark
- Malabar lark
- Sun lark
- Thekla lark
- Woodlark
- Bimaculated lark
- Calandra lark
- White-winged lark
- Tibetan lark
- Mongolian lark
- Black lark
- Jerdon's bush lark
- Rufous-naped lark
- Fawn-coloured lark
- White-tailed lark
- Foxy lark
- Angolan lark
- Cape clapper lark
- Bengal bush lark
- Singing bush lark
- Collared lark
- Kordofan lark
- Indochinese bush lark
- Indian bush lark
- Gillett's lark
- Madagascan lark
- Red-winged lark
- Horsfield's bush lark
- Burmese bush lark
- Monotonous lark
- Pink-breasted lark
- Rusty bush lark
- Flappet lark
- Sabota lark
- Somali lark
- Friedmann's lark
- Rufous-rumped lark
- Dusky lark
- Short-tailed lark
- Thick-billed lark
- Pink-billed lark
- Obbia lark
- Masked lark

=== Pycnonotidae ===
Bulbuls

- Seram golden bulbul
- White-throated bulbul
- Ochraceous bulbul
- Puff-throated bulbul
- Yellow-bellied bulbul
- Ansorge's greenbul
- Plain greenbul
- Slender-billed greenbul
- Little grey greenbul
- Sombre greenbul
- Yellow-whiskered greenbul
- Shelley's greenbul
- Stripe-cheeked greenbul
- Mountain greenbul
- Western greenbul
- Little greenbul
- Sjöstedt's greenbul
- Honeyguide greenbul
- Grey-headed bristlebill
- Yellow-lored bristlebill
- Red-tailed bristlebill
- Golden greenbul
- Falkenstein's greenbul
- Yellow-throated leaflove
- Yellow-bellied greenbul
- Joyful greenbul
- Simple greenbul
- Western bearded greenbul
- Red-tailed greenbul
- Eastern bearded greenbul
- White-bearded greenbul
- Chestnut bulbul
- Ashy bulbul
- Réunion bulbul
- Seychelles bulbul
- Black bulbul
- Malagasy bulbul
- Mountain bulbul
- Grand Comoro bulbul
- White-headed bulbul
- Yellow-browed bulbul
- Grey-eyed bulbul
- Olive bulbul
- Spotted greenbul
- Brown-eared bulbul
- Yellowish bulbul
- Sulphur-bellied bulbul
- Philippine bulbul
- Black-collared bulbul
- White-throated greenbul
- Baumann's olive greenbul
- Cabanis's greenbul
- Grey-olive greenbul
- Lowland tiny greenbul
- Fischer's greenbul
- Yellow-streaked greenbul
- Pale-olive greenbul
- Toro olive greenbul
- Icterine greenbul
- Cameroon olive greenbul
- Northern brownbul
- Terrestrial brownbul
- Xavier's greenbul
- Black-headed bulbul
- Sooty-headed bulbul
- Common bulbul
- Orange-spotted bulbul
- Streak-eared bulbul
- Asian red-eyed bulbul
- Red-vented bulbul
- Cape bulbul
- Spectacled bulbul
- Stripe-throated bulbul
- Flavescent bulbul
- Yellow-vented bulbul
- Bare-faced bulbul
- Red-whiskered bulbul
- Himalayan bulbul
- Cream-striped bulbul
- White-eared bulbul
- White-browed bulbul
- Black-capped bulbul
- African red-eyed bulbul
- Olive-winged bulbul
- Cream-vented bulbul
- Light-vented bulbul
- Striated bulbul
- Yellow-wattled bulbul
- White-spectacled bulbul
- Brown-breasted bulbul
- Red-tailed leaflove
- Crested finchbill
- Collared finchbill
- Swamp palm bulbul
- Hairy-backed bulbul

=== Hirundinidae ===
Swallows and martins

- Tawny-headed swallow
- White-banded swallow
- Black-collared swallow
- White-backed swallow
- Asian house martin
- Nepal house martin
- Common house martin
- Andean swallow
- Lesser striped swallow
- Ethiopian swallow
- White-throated swallow
- Angolan swallow
- Fairy martin
- Dusky crag martin
- Greater striped swallow
- Red-rumped swallow
- Pearl-breasted swallow
- Hill swallow
- Streak-throated swallow
- Forest swallow
- Rock martin
- Pied-winged swallow
- Red-chested swallow
- Welcome swallow
- Tree martin
- White-bibbed swallow
- Black-and-rufous swallow
- Pale crag martin
- Preuss's cliff swallow
- Red-throated cliff swallow
- Eurasian crag martin
- Barn swallow
- Red-breasted swallow
- Mosque swallow
- Wire-tailed swallow
- South African cliff swallow
- Pacific swallow
- White-thighed swallow
- Pale-footed swallow
- Brown-bellied swallow
- Black-capped swallow
- Cave swallow
- American cliff swallow
- Chestnut-collared swallow
- Mascarene martin
- Brazza's martin
- Grey-breasted martin
- Cuban martin
- Caribbean martin
- Southern martin
- Purple martin
- Brown-chested martin
- White-headed saw-wing
- Mountain saw-wing
- Square-tailed saw-wing
- Fanti saw-wing
- Black saw-wing
- African river martin
- Grey-rumped swallow
- Blue-and-white swallow
- Banded martin
- Congo martin
- Brown-throated martin
- Sand martin
- Southern rough-winged swallow
- Northern rough-winged swallow
- Mangrove swallow
- White-winged swallow
- Tree swallow
- White-rumped swallow
- Chilean swallow
- Tumbes swallow
- Violet-green swallow

=== Pnoepygidae ===
Cupwings

- Scaly-breasted cupwing
- Taiwan cupwing
- Nepal cupwing
- Pygmy cupwing

=== Macrosphenidae ===
Crombecs and African warblers

- Rockrunner
- Victorin's warbler
- Grey longbill
- Yellow longbill
- Kemp's longbill
- Kretschmer's longbill
- Moustached grass warbler
- Cape grassbird
- Northern crombec
- Lemon-bellied crombec
- Somali crombec
- White-browed crombec
- Long-billed crombec
- Red-capped crombec
- Green crombec
- Red-faced crombec

=== Cettiidae ===
Cettia bush warblers and allies

- Rufous-faced warbler
- Black-faced warbler
- Yellow-bellied warbler
- Grey-sided bush warbler
- Chestnut-headed tesia
- Cetti's warbler
- Chestnut-crowned bush warbler
- Neumann's warbler
- Pale-footed bush warbler
- Yellow-bellied bush warbler
- Palau bush warbler
- Hume's bush warbler
- Manchurian bush warbler
- Japanese bush warbler
- Aberrant bush warbler
- Brown-flanked bush warbler
- Shade bush warbler
- Fiji bush warbler
- Philippine bush warbler
- Mountain tailorbird
- Rufous-headed tailorbird
- Grey-bellied tesia
- Russet-capped tesia
- Slaty-bellied tesia
- Javan tesia
- Broad-billed warbler
- Asian stubtail
- Timor stubtail
- Bornean stubtail

=== Scotocercidae ===
Streaked scrub warbler (monotypic)

- Streaked scrub warbler

=== Erythrocercidae ===
Yellow flycatchers

- Little yellow flycatcher
- Livingstone's flycatcher
- Chestnut-capped flycatcher

=== Hyliidae ===
Hylias

- Green hylia
- Tit hylia

=== Aegithalidae ===
Bushtits

- Long-tailed tit
- Black-throated bushtit
- Pygmy bushtit
- Sooty bushtit
- Rufous-fronted bushtit
- White-cheeked bushtit
- White-throated bushtit
- Crested tit-warbler
- White-browed tit-warbler
- American bushtit

=== Phylloscopidae ===
Leaf warblers

- Tickell's leaf warbler
- Yellow-streaked warbler
- Western Bonelli's warbler
- Arctic warbler
- Sakhalin leaf warbler
- Uganda woodland warbler
- Green-crowned warbler
- Canary Islands chiffchaff
- Yellow-vented warbler
- Chestnut-crowned warbler
- Lemon-throated leaf warbler
- Lemon-rumped warbler
- Claudia's leaf warbler
- Common chiffchaff
- Eastern crowned warbler
- Davison's leaf warbler
- Emei leaf warbler
- Sichuan leaf warbler
- Smoky warbler
- Dusky warbler
- Hartert's leaf warbler
- Sunda warbler
- Sulphur-bellied warbler
- Black-capped woodland warbler
- Hume's leaf warbler
- Iberian chiffchaff
- Yellow-browed warbler
- White-spectacled warbler
- Gansu leaf warbler
- Red-faced woodland warbler
- Laura's woodland warbler
- Ashy-throated warbler
- Large-billed leaf warbler
- Makira leaf warbler
- Yellow-breasted warbler
- Plain leaf warbler
- Western crowned warbler
- Kloss's leaf warbler
- Philippine leaf warbler
- Martens's warbler
- Island leaf warbler
- Grey-cheeked warbler
- Timor leaf warbler
- Pallas's leaf warbler
- Buff-barred warbler
- Blyth's leaf warbler
- Sulphur-breasted warbler
- Yellow-throated woodland warbler
- Sulawesi leaf warbler
- Radde's warbler
- Wood warbler
- Mountain chiffchaff
- Alström's warbler
- Buff-throated warbler
- Brooks's leaf warbler
- Pale-legged leaf warbler
- Grey-crowned warbler
- Mountain leaf warbler
- Greenish warbler
- Willow warbler
- Brown woodland warbler
- Bianchi's warbler
- Whistler's warbler
- Grey-hooded warbler
- Chinese leaf warbler

=== Acrocephalidae ===
Reed warblers and allies

- Paddyfield warbler
- Great reed warbler
- Tuamotu reed warbler
- Australian reed warbler
- Black-browed reed warbler
- Blunt-winged warbler
- Blyth's reed warbler
- Lesser swamp warbler
- Moustached warbler
- Southern Marquesan reed warbler
- Madagascan swamp warbler
- Large-billed reed warbler
- Marsh warbler
- Greater swamp warbler
- Sedge warbler
- Eurasian reed warbler
- Clamorous reed warbler
- Carolinian reed warbler
- Thick-billed warbler
- Grauer's warbler
- Icterine warbler
- Upcher's warbler
- Olive-tree warbler
- Melodious warbler
- Booted warbler
- African yellow warbler
- Western olivaceous warbler
- Eastern olivaceous warbler
- Sykes's warbler
- Mountain yellow warbler
- Grand Comoro brush warbler
- Subdesert brush warbler
- Anjouan brush warbler
- Moheli brush warbler
- Malagasy brush warbler

=== Locustellidae ===
Grassbirds and allies

- Little rush warbler
- Bangwa warbler
- Barratt's warbler
- Brown emutail
- White-winged swamp warbler
- Highland rush warbler
- Cinnamon bracken warbler
- Evergreen forest warbler
- Grey emutail
- Fan-tailed grassbird
- Buff-banded bushbird
- Brown songlark
- Papuan grassbird
- Rufous songlark
- New Caledonian thicketbird
- Rusty thicketbird
- Tawny grassbird
- Santo thicketbird
- Sakhalin grasshopper warbler
- Pallas's grasshopper warbler
- Gray's grasshopper warbler
- Middendorf's grasshopper warbler
- Pleske's grasshopper warbler
- Marsh grassbird
- Friendly bush warbler
- Bamboo warbler
- Taiwan bush warbler
- Sulawesi bush warbler
- Long-tailed bush warbler
- Baikal bush warbler
- River warbler
- Lanceolated warbler
- Savi's warbler
- Brown bush warbler
- Russet bush warbler
- Javan bush warbler
- Common grasshopper warbler
- Benguet bush warbler
- Chinese bush warbler
- Spotted bush warbler
- Malia
- Striated grassbird
- Spinifexbird
- Little grassbird
- New Zealand fernbird
- Sierra Madre ground warbler

=== Donacobiidae ===
Donacobius (monotypic)

- Black-capped donacobius

=== Bernieridae ===
Tetrakas and allies

- Long-billed bernieria
- Cryptic warbler
- White-throated oxylabes
- Rand's warbler
- Thamnornis

=== Cisticolidae ===
Cisticolas and allies

- Bamenda apalis
- Lowland masked apalis
- Chapin's apalis
- Chirinda apalis
- Grey apalis
- Yellow-breasted apalis
- Gosling's apalis
- Black-throated apalis
- Black-headed apalis
- Black-capped apalis
- Mountain masked apalis
- Chestnut-throated apalis
- Rudd's apalis
- Buff-throated apalis
- Sharpe's apalis
- Bar-throated apalis
- Red-capped forest warbler
- Black-faced rufous warbler
- Barred wren-warbler
- Grey wren-warbler
- Stierling's wren-warbler
- Miombo wren-warbler
- Bleating camaroptera
- Olive-green camaroptera
- Hartert's camaroptera
- Yellow-browed camaroptera
- Lazy cisticola
- Long-tailed cisticola
- Chattering cisticola
- Desert cisticola
- Wing-snapping cisticola
- Boran cisticola
- Short-winged cisticola
- Pectoral-patch cisticola
- Bubbling cisticola
- Singing cisticola
- Carruthers's cisticola
- Madagascan cisticola
- Rattling cisticola
- Chubb's cisticola
- Ashy cisticola
- Dambo cisticola
- Brown-backed cisticola
- Red-faced cisticola
- Golden-headed cisticola
- Black-backed cisticola
- Neddicky
- Winding cisticola
- Dorst's cisticola
- Socotra cisticola
- Hunter's cisticola
- Zitting cisticola
- Wailing cisticola
- Whistling cisticola
- Black-tailed cisticola
- Tiny cisticola
- Croaking cisticola
- Black-lored cisticola
- Churring cisticola
- Chirping cisticola
- Stout cisticola
- Red-pate cisticola
- Tinkling cisticola
- Rufous cisticola
- Grey-backed cisticola
- Cloud cisticola
- Levaillant's cisticola
- Foxy cisticola
- Trilling cisticola
- Red-winged grey warbler
- Grey-capped warbler
- Black-necked eremomela
- Rufous-crowned eremomela
- Yellow-vented eremomela
- Karoo eremomela
- Yellow-bellied eremomela
- Green-backed eremomela
- Green-capped eremomela
- Burnt-necked eremomela
- Cinnamon-breasted warbler
- Red-winged warbler
- Oriole warbler
- Socotra warbler
- Rufous-eared warbler
- Stripe-throated jery
- Common jery
- Green jery
- Black-collared apalis
- Rwenzori apalis
- Roberts's warbler
- Dark-necked tailorbird
- Philippine tailorbird
- White-eared tailorbird
- Grey-backed tailorbird
- Rufous-fronted tailorbird
- Black-headed tailorbird
- Ashy tailorbird
- Olive-backed tailorbird
- Rufous-tailed tailorbird
- Common tailorbird
- Namaqua warbler
- Buff-bellied warbler
- White-tailed warbler
- Black-throated prinia
- Banded prinia
- Rufous-fronted prinia
- Striated prinia
- Black-chested prinia
- Yellow-bellied prinia
- River prinia
- Graceful prinia
- Grey-breasted prinia
- Drakensberg prinia
- Plain prinia
- Karoo prinia
- São Tomé prinia
- Brown prinia
- Rufescent prinia
- Red-fronted prinia
- Ashy prinia
- Pale prinia
- Tawny-flanked prinia
- Jungle prinia
- White-chinned prinia
- Cricket warbler
- Green longtail

=== Sylviidae ===
Sylviid babblers

- Banded parisoma
- Eastern subalpine warbler
- Common whitethroat
- Spectacled warbler
- Lesser whitethroat
- Tristram's warbler
- Western Orphean warbler
- Layard's warbler
- Arabian warbler
- Brown parisoma
- Sardinian warbler
- Cyprus warbler
- Menetries's warbler
- Asian desert warbler
- Barred warbler
- Rüppell's warbler
- Marmora's warbler
- Chestnut-vented warbler
- African hill babbler
- Eurasian blackcap
- Rwenzori hill babbler
- Garden warbler
- Dohrn's warbler
- Abyssinian catbird

=== Paradoxornithidae ===
Parrotbills and allies

- Wrentit
- Yellow-eyed babbler
- Grey-hooded fulvetta
- Indochinese fulvetta
- Taiwan fulvetta
- Brown-throated fulvetta
- Manipur fulvetta
- Spectacled fulvetta
- Chinese fulvetta
- White-browed fulvetta
- Golden-breasted fulvetta
- Rufous-tailed babbler
- Fire-tailed myzornis
- Great parrotbill
- Rufous-headed parrotbill
- Grey-headed parrotbill
- Spot-breasted parrotbill
- Reed parrotbill
- Three-toed parrotbill
- White-breasted parrotbill
- Brown parrotbill
- Tarim babbler
- Beijing babbler
- Ashy-throated parrotbill
- Pale-billed parrotbill
- Brown-winged parrotbill
- Spectacled parrotbill
- Short-tailed parrotbill
- Fulvous parrotbill
- Black-throated parrotbill
- Rusty-throated parrotbill
- Eye-ringed parrotbill
- Golden parrotbill
- Vinous-throated parrotbill
- Grey-hooded parrotbill

=== Zosteropidae ===
White-eyes

- Bonin white-eye
- Thick-billed heleia
- Crested heleia
- Mindanao heleia
- Javan heleia
- Timor heleia
- Grey-hooded heleia
- Sulawesi heleia
- Pygmy heleia
- Eyebrowed heleia
- Yellow-spectacled heleia
- White-collared yuhina
- Striated yuhina
- Chestnut-crested yuhina
- Indochinese yuhina
- Rusty-crowned babbler
- Black-crowned babbler
- Rufescent darkeye
- White-naped yuhina
- Taiwan yuhina
- Whiskered yuhina
- Stripe-throated yuhina
- Burmese yuhina
- Black-chinned yuhina
- Rufous-vented yuhina
- Abyssinian white-eye
- Black-ringed white-eye
- Black-capped white-eye
- Cream-throated white-eye
- Black-crowned white-eye
- Réunion grey white-eye
- Buru white-eye
- Sri Lanka white-eye
- Lemon-bellied white-eye
- Grey-brown white-eye
- Ashy-bellied white-eye
- Pale-bellied white-eye
- Mountain blackeye
- Chestnut-flanked white-eye
- Everett's white-eye
- Fiji white-eye
- Dusky white-eye
- Vanuatu white-eye
- Capped white-eye
- Vanikoro white-eye
- Louisiade white-eye
- Bismarck white-eye
- Large Lifou white-eye
- Japanese white-eye
- Solomons white-eye
- Silvereye
- Principe speirops
- Black-capped speirops
- Canary white-eye
- Malagasy white-eye
- Mayotte white-eye
- Yellow-throated white-eye
- Lowland white-eye
- Black-fronted white-eye
- Small Lifou white-eye
- Mountain white-eye
- Kolombangara white-eye
- Yellowish white-eye
- Papuan white-eye
- Réunion olive white-eye
- Orange River white-eye
- Oriental white-eye
- Montane white-eye
- Grey-throated white-eye
- Rennell white-eye
- Enggano white-eye
- Santa Cruz white-eye
- Citrine white-eye
- African yellow white-eye
- Seram white-eye
- Malaita white-eye
- Bare-eyed white-eye
- Pemba white-eye
- Yellow-ringed white-eye
- Green-backed white-eye
- Palawan striped babbler
- Panay striped babbler
- Luzon striped babbler
- Chestnut-faced babbler

=== Timaliidae ===
Old World babblers

- Grey-hooded babbler
- Golden babbler
- Chestnut-winged babbler
- Crescent-chested babbler
- Black-chinned babbler
- Rufous-capped babbler
- Rufous-fronted babbler
- Tawny-bellied babbler
- Black-necklaced scimitar babbler
- Rusty-cheeked scimitar babbler
- Black-streaked scimitar babbler
- Large scimitar babbler
- Spot-breasted scimitar babbler
- Grey-sided scimitar babbler
- Brown tit-babbler
- Bare-headed laughingthrush
- Black laughingthrush
- Bold-striped tit-babbler
- Grey-cheeked tit-babbler
- Pin-striped tit-babbler
- Grey-faced tit-babbler
- Kangean tit-babbler
- Coral-billed scimitar babbler
- Indian scimitar babbler
- Sri Lanka scimitar babbler
- Chestnut-backed scimitar babbler
- Taiwan scimitar babbler
- Red-billed scimitar babbler
- Streak-breasted scimitar babbler
- White-browed scimitar babbler
- Slender-billed scimitar babbler
- Rufous-throated wren-babbler
- Chin Hills wren-babbler
- Grey-bellied wren-babbler
- Bar-winged wren-babbler
- Buff-chested babbler
- Golden babbler
- Chestnut-winged babbler
- Sooty babbler
- Crescent-chested babbler
- Grey-throated babbler
- Grey-headed babbler
- Black-chinned babbler
- Rufous-capped babbler
- Rufous-fronted babbler
- Spot-necked babbler
- White-bibbed babbler
- Chestnut-capped babbler

=== Pellorneidae ===
Ground babblers

- White-hooded babbler
- Collared babbler
- Variable limestone babbler
- Rusty-breasted wren-babbler
- Scaly-breasted illadopsis
- Blackcap illadopsis
- Brown illadopsis
- Puvel's illadopsis
- Mountain illadopsis
- Pale-breasted illadopsis
- Spotted thrush-babbler
- Abbott's babbler
- Ashy-headed babbler
- Horsfield's babbler
- Scaly-crowned babbler
- Moustached babbler
- Sumatran wren-babbler
- Streaked wren-babbler
- Mountain wren-babbler
- Eyebrowed wren-babbler
- Long-billed wren-babbler
- Spot-throated babbler
- Ferruginous babbler
- Black-capped babbler
- Sulawesi babbler
- Brown-capped babbler
- Temminck's babbler
- Puff-throated babbler
- Buff-breasted babbler
- Striated wren-babbler
- Dusky fulvetta
- Rufous-winged fulvetta
- Yellow-throated fulvetta
- Rusty-capped fulvetta
- Black-crowned fulvetta
- Rufous-throated fulvetta
- Marbled wren-babbler

=== Alcippeidae ===
Alcippe fulvettas

- Black-browed fulvetta
- Grey-cheeked fulvetta
- Nepal fulvetta
- Mountain fulvetta
- Brown-cheeked fulvetta
- Javan fulvetta

=== Leiothrichidae ===
Laughingthrushes and allies

- Blue-winged minla
- Rusty-fronted barwing
- Taiwan barwing
- Hoary-throated barwing
- Spectacled barwing
- Streaked barwing
- Bar-throated minla
- Streak-throated barwing
- Himalayan cutia
- Orange-breasted laughingthrush
- Chinese hwamei
- Rufous-cheeked laughingthrush
- White-crested laughingthrush
- Grey laughingthrush
- Spot-breasted laughingthrush
- Lesser necklaced laughingthrush
- Sunda laughingthrush
- White-necked laughingthrush
- Striated laughingthrush
- Rufous-backed sibia
- White-eared sibia
- Rufous sibia
- Black-headed sibia
- Grey sibia
- Dark-backed sibia
- Long-tailed sibia
- Beautiful sibia
- Moustached laughingthrush
- Barred laughingthrush
- Giant laughingthrush
- Spotted laughingthrush
- Rufous-chinned laughingthrush
- Silver-eared mesia
- Red-billed leiothrix
- Red-faced liocichla
- Steere's liocichla
- Red-tailed minla
- White-throated laughingthrush
- Buffy laughingthrush
- Grey-sided laughingthrush
- Black-throated laughingthrush
- Plain laughingthrush
- Wayanad laughingthrush
- Yellow-throated laughingthrush
- Rufous-vented laughingthrush
- Tibetan babax
- Chinese babax
- Chestnut-capped laughingthrush
- Greater necklaced laughingthrush
- Masked laughingthrush
- Rusty laughingthrush
- Rufous-crowned laughingthrush
- Rufous-necked laughingthrush
- White-browed laughingthrush
- White-cheeked laughingthrush
- Giant babax
- Black-faced laughingthrush
- Brown-capped laughingthrush
- Assam laughingthrush
- Elliot's laughingthrush
- Chestnut-crowned laughingthrush
- Red-winged laughingthrush
- Brown-cheeked laughingthrush
- Bhutan laughingthrush
- Streaked laughingthrush
- Silver-eared laughingthrush
- Red-tailed laughingthrush
- White-whiskered laughingthrush
- Malayan laughingthrush
- Blue-winged laughingthrush
- Scaly laughingthrush
- Variegated laughingthrush
- Striped laughingthrush
- Yellow-billed babbler
- Iraq babbler
- Capuchin babbler
- Scaly chatterer
- Southern pied babbler
- Common babbler
- Striated babbler
- Fulvous babbler
- White-throated babbler
- Bare-cheeked babbler
- Hartlaub's babbler
- Northern pied babbler
- Arrow-marked babbler
- White-headed babbler
- White-rumped babbler
- Large grey babbler
- Black-faced babbler
- Spiny babbler
- Brown babbler
- Blackcap babbler
- Rufous chatterer
- Black-lored babbler
- Arabian babbler
- Scaly babbler
- Jungle babbler
- Rufous babbler
- Dusky babbler

=== Modulatricidae ===
Dapple-throat and allies

- Grey-chested babbler

=== Promeropidae ===
Sugarbirds

- Cape sugarbird
- Gurney's sugarbird

=== Irenidae ===
Fairy-bluebirds

- Asian fairy-bluebird

=== Regulidae ===
Goldcrests and kinglets

- Ruby-crowned kinglet
- Flamecrest
- Common firecrest
- Madeira firecrest
- Goldcrest
- Golden-crowned kinglet

=== Elachuridae ===
Elachura (monotypic)

- Spotted elachura

=== Hyliotidae ===
Hyliotas

- Southern hyliota
- Yellow-bellied hyliota
- Violet-backed hyliota

=== Troglodytidae ===
Wrens

- White-headed wren
- Cactus wren
- Giant wren
- Fasciated wren
- Bicolored wren
- Spotted wren
- Boucard's wren
- Gray-barred wren
- Stripe-backed wren
- Rufous-naped wren
- Thrush-like wren
- Band-backed wren
- Canyon wren
- Fulvous wren
- Sepia-brown wren
- Peruvian wren
- Rufous wren
- Mérida wren
- Marsh wren
- Sedge wren
- Musician wren
- Song wren
- Chestnut-breasted wren
- Grey-breasted wood wren
- White-breasted wood wren
- Wing-banded wren
- Southern nightingale-wren
- Northern nightingale-wren
- Flutist wren
- Grey-mantled wren
- Rock wren
- Bewick's wren
- Timberline wren
- Black-throated wren
- Coraya wren
- Inca wren
- Plain-tailed wren
- Black-bellied wren
- Happy wren
- Moustached wren
- Grey wren
- Fawn-breasted wren
- Stripe-throated wren
- Buff-breasted wren
- Long-billed wren
- Carolina wren
- Spot-breasted wren
- Plain wren
- Whiskered wren
- Bay wren
- Banded wren
- Rufous-and-white wren
- Rufous-breasted wren
- Speckle-breasted wren
- Riverside wren
- Sinaloa wren
- Sooty-headed wren
- Superciliated wren
- Stripe-breasted wren
- House wren
- Ochraceous wren
- Rufous-browed wren
- Tepui wren
- Mountain wren
- Eurasian wren
- White-bellied wren

=== Polioptilidae ===
Gnatcatchers

- Tawny-faced gnatwren
- Collared gnatwren
- White-lored gnatcatcher
- Blue-gray gnatcatcher
- California gnatcatcher
- Masked gnatcatcher
- Guianan gnatcatcher
- Cuban gnatcatcher
- Black-tailed gnatcatcher
- Black-capped gnatcatcher
- Tropical gnatcatcher
- Slate-throated gnatcatcher
- Long-billed gnatwren

=== Sittidae ===
Nuthatches

- Blue nuthatch
- Red-breasted nuthatch
- White-breasted nuthatch
- Kashmir nuthatch
- Indian nuthatch
- Eurasian nuthatch
- Velvet-fronted nuthatch
- White-tailed nuthatch
- Krüper's nuthatch
- White-cheeked nuthatch
- Chestnut-vented nuthatch
- Western rock nuthatch
- Sulphur-billed nuthatch
- Brown-headed nuthatch
- Pygmy nuthatch
- Eastern rock nuthatch
- Chinese nuthatch

=== Tichodromidae ===
Wallcreeper (monotypic)

- Wallcreeper

=== Certhiidae ===
Treecreepers

- Brown creeper
- Short-toed treecreeper
- Sikkim treecreeper
- Eurasian treecreeper
- Bar-tailed treecreeper
- Hodgson's treecreeper
- Hume's treecreeper
- Rusty-flanked treecreeper
- Sichuan treecreeper

=== Salpornithidae ===
Spotted creepers

- African spotted creeper
- Indian spotted creeper

=== Mimidae ===
Mockingbirds and thrashers

- Scaly-breasted thrasher
- Grey trembler
- Brown trembler
- Gray catbird
- Pearly-eyed thrasher
- Black catbird
- Blue mockingbird
- Blue-and-white mockingbird
- Brown-backed mockingbird
- Tropical mockingbird
- Bahama mockingbird
- Long-tailed mockingbird
- Galápagos mockingbird
- Patagonian mockingbird
- Northern mockingbird
- Chalk-browed mockingbird
- Chilean mockingbird
- White-banded mockingbird
- Sage thrasher
- Gray thrasher
- Crissal thrasher
- Curve-billed thrasher
- Le Conte's thrasher
- Long-billed thrasher
- Ocellated thrasher
- California thrasher
- Brown thrasher

=== Sturnidae ===
Starlings and allies

- Collared myna
- Pale-bellied myna
- Crested myna
- Jungle myna
- Bank myna
- Great myna
- Common myna
- Golden-crested myna
- Samoan starling
- Singing starling
- Makira starling
- Brown-winged starling
- Rennell starling
- Long-tailed starling
- Metallic starling
- Short-tailed starling
- Moluccan starling
- Micronesian starling
- Asian glossy starling
- Striated starling
- Polynesian starling
- Sulawesi myna
- Long-crested myna
- Violet-backed starling
- Sharpe's starling
- Emerald starling
- Golden-breasted starling
- Ashy starling
- Wattled starling
- Fiery-browed starling
- Common hill myna
- White-collared starling
- Sharp-tailed starling
- Burchell's starling
- Long-tailed glossy starling
- Bronze-tailed starling
- Greater blue-eared starling
- Lesser blue-eared starling
- Black-bellied starling
- Miombo blue-eared starling
- Hildebrandt's starling
- Meves's starling
- Cape starling
- Principe starling
- Chestnut-bellied starling
- Purple-headed starling
- Purple starling
- Rüppell's starling
- Shelley's starling
- Splendid starling
- Superb starling
- Golden myna
- Yellow-faced myna
- Babbling starling
- White-billed starling
- Somali starling
- Socotra starling
- Chestnut-winged starling
- Red-winged starling
- Pale-winged starling
- Bristle-crowned starling
- Slender-billed starling
- Tristram's starling
- Waller's starling
- Kenrick's starling
- Narrow-tailed starling
- Stuhlmann's starling
- Grand rhabdornis
- Stripe-breasted rhabdornis
- Stripe-headed rhabdornis
- Coleto
- Madagascan starling
- Spot-winged starling
- Grosbeak starling
- Magpie starling
- White-crowned starling
- Pied starling
- Fischer's starling
- White-necked myna
- Vinous-breasted starling
- White-cheeked starling
- Pied myna
- White-headed starling
- Chestnut-tailed starling
- Black-collared starling
- Brahminy starling
- Chestnut-cheeked starling
- Rosy starling
- Red-billed starling
- White-shouldered starling
- Daurian starling
- Spotless starling
- Common starling

=== Buphagidae ===
Oxpeckers

- Yellow-billed oxpecker
- Red-billed oxpecker

=== Turdidae ===
Thrushes

- Fire-crested alethe
- White-tailed alethe
- White-chested alethe
- Brown-chested alethe
- Red-throated alethe
- Lesser shortwing
- White-browed shortwing
- Gould's shortwing
- Sulawesi thrush
- Orange-billed nightingale-thrush
- Spotted nightingale-thrush
- Ruddy-capped nightingale-thrush
- Slaty-backed nightingale-thrush
- Veery
- Black-billed nightingale-thrush
- Hermit thrush
- Black-headed nightingale-thrush
- Grey-cheeked thrush
- Russet nightingale-thrush
- Swainson's thrush
- Fruithunter
- Rufous-brown solitaire
- Purple cochoa
- Green cochoa
- Black solitaire
- White-eared solitaire
- Black-eared ground thrush
- Orange-headed thrush
- Abyssinian ground thrush
- Grey ground thrush
- Siberian thrush
- Pied thrush
- Grandala
- Great shortwing
- Wood thrush
- Varied thrush
- Varied solitaire
- Rufous-throated solitaire
- Black-faced solitaire
- Brown-backed solitaire
- Andean solitaire
- Townsend's solitaire
- Slate-coloured solitaire
- Bornean whistling thrush
- Blue whistling thrush
- Javan whistling thrush
- Malabar whistling thrush
- Taiwan whistling thrush
- Shiny whistling thrush
- White-tailed ant thrush
- Red-tailed ant thrush
- Boulder chat
- Groundscraper thrush
- Aztec thrush
- Mountain bluebird
- Western bluebird
- Eastern bluebird
- Fraser's rufous thrush
- White-necked thrush
- White-collared blackbird
- Creamy-bellied thrush
- White-throated thrush
- White-chinned thrush
- Comoros thrush
- Grey-winged blackbird
- Japanese thrush
- Chiguanco thrush
- Brown-headed thrush
- Black-breasted thrush
- Austral thrush
- Yellow-legged thrush
- Chestnut-bellied thrush
- Cocoa thrush
- Great thrush
- Clay-colored thrush
- Hauxwell's thrush
- Grey-backed thrush
- Black-billed thrush
- Black thrush
- White-eyed thrush
- Kessler's thrush
- Lawrence's thrush
- Pale-breasted thrush
- Pale-eyed thrush
- Kurrichane thrush
- Ecuadorian thrush
- Marañón thrush
- Common blackbird
- American robin
- Chinese thrush
- Naumann's thrush
- Sooty thrush
- Andean slaty thrush
- Spectacled thrush
- Eyebrowed thrush
- Pale-vented thrush
- Olive thrush
- Black-hooded thrush
- Pale thrush
- African thrush
- Song thrush
- Fieldfare
- Mountain thrush
- Western red-legged thrush
- Eastern red-legged thrush
- Island thrush
- Plumbeous-backed thrush
- Chestnut thrush
- Red-throated thrush
- Rufous-collared thrush
- Rufous-bellied thrush
- Rufous-backed thrush
- Glossy-black thrush
- Bare-eyed thrush
- Ring ouzel
- Tickell's thrush
- Mistle thrush
- Sunda thrush
- Scaly thrush
- Long-tailed thrush
- Orange ground thrush
- Russet-tailed thrush
- Bassian thrush
- Dark-sided thrush
- Plain-backed thrush
- Long-billed thrush
- Varied thrush

=== Muscicapidae ===
Old World flycatchers and allies

- Chat flycatcher
- Marico flycatcher
- African grey flycatcher
- Pale flycatcher
- Familiar chat
- Brown rock chat
- Blackstart
- Karoo chat
- Brown-tailed rock chat
- Sickle-winged chat
- Moorland chat
- Tractrac chat
- Black scrub robin
- White-capped redstart
- Collared palm thrush
- Spotted palm thrush
- Rufous-tailed palm thrush
- Sunda robin
- Blue-fronted robin
- White-tailed robin
- Madagascan magpie-robin
- White-browed shama
- White-rumped shama
- White-vented shama
- Oriental magpie-robin
- White-crowned robin-chat
- Olive-flanked ground robin
- Archer's ground robin
- Cape robin-chat
- Blue-shouldered robin-chat
- Chorister robin-chat
- White-browed robin-chat
- White-throated robin-chat
- Mountain robin-chat
- Red-capped robin-chat
- Snowy-crowned robin-chat
- Grey-winged robin-chat
- Rüppell's robin-chat
- White-bellied robin-chat
- Blue-and-white flycatcher
- Hill blue flycatcher
- White-tailed flycatcher
- Hainan blue flycatcher
- Blue-breasted blue flycatcher
- Blue-fronted blue flycatcher
- Timor blue flycatcher
- Large blue flycatcher
- Sulawesi blue flycatcher
- White-bellied blue flycatcher
- Pale-chinned blue flycatcher
- Blue-throated blue flycatcher
- Mangrove blue flycatcher
- Bornean blue flycatcher
- Tickell's blue flycatcher
- Pale blue flycatcher
- Angolan slaty flycatcher
- Abyssinian slaty flycatcher
- White-eyed slaty flycatcher
- Silverbird
- Black-backed forktail
- White-crowned forktail
- Spotted forktail
- Slaty-backed forktail
- Little forktail
- Sunda forktail
- Japanese robin
- European robin
- Miombo scrub robin
- Karoo scrub robin
- Rufous-tailed scrub robin
- Brown-backed scrub robin
- White-browed scrub robin
- Forest scrub robin
- Kalahari scrub robin
- Bearded scrub robin
- Brown scrub robin
- Indigo flycatcher
- Turquoise flycatcher
- Verditer flycatcher
- Taiga flycatcher
- Collared flycatcher
- Cinnamon-chested flycatcher
- Cryptic flycatcher
- Sumba flycatcher
- Slaty-backed flycatcher
- Snowy-browed flycatcher
- European pied flycatcher
- White-gorgeted flycatcher
- Mugimaki flycatcher
- Narcissus flycatcher
- Red-breasted flycatcher
- Sapphire flycatcher
- Semicollared flycatcher
- Rufous-browed flycatcher
- Rufous-gorgeted flycatcher
- Ultramarine flycatcher
- Slaty-blue flycatcher
- Little pied flycatcher
- Yellow-rumped flycatcher
- White-browed forest flycatcher
- Fraser's forest flycatcher
- Tessmann's flycatcher
- White-bellied redstart
- White-throated robin
- Bagobo babbler
- Indian blue robin
- Siberian rubythroat
- Siberian blue robin
- Thrush nightingale
- Common nightingale
- White-tailed rubythroat
- Rufous-tailed robin
- Bluethroat
- Yellow-eyed black flycatcher
- Northern black flycatcher
- Southern black flycatcher
- Spot-throat
- Miombo rock thrush
- Short-toed rock thrush
- Blue-capped rock thrush
- Sentinel rock thrush
- White-throated rock thrush
- Littoral rock thrush
- Chestnut-bellied rock thrush
- Little rock thrush
- Cape rock thrush
- Common rock thrush
- White-winged cliff chat
- Forest rock thrush
- Blue rock thrush
- African dusky flycatcher
- Swamp flycatcher
- Böhm's flycatcher
- Ashy flycatcher
- Cassin's flycatcher
- Dusky-blue flycatcher
- Asian brown flycatcher
- Little grey flycatcher
- Ferruginous flycatcher
- Gambaga flycatcher
- Grey-streaked flycatcher
- Sooty flycatcher
- Brown-breasted flycatcher
- Olivaceous flycatcher
- Rusty-tailed flycatcher
- Yellow-footed flycatcher
- Dark-sided flycatcher
- Spotted flycatcher
- Ussher's flycatcher
- Pygmy flycatcher
- Grey-throated tit-flycatcher
- Grey tit-flycatcher
- Anteater chat
- White-fronted black chat
- Arnot's chat
- Ant-eating chat
- Rüppell's black chat
- Sooty chat
- Congo moor chat
- Herero chat
- Fujian niltava
- Large niltava
- Small niltava
- Rufous-vented niltava
- Rufous-bellied niltava
- Vivid niltava
- Hume's wheatear
- Buff-streaked chat
- Red-breasted wheatear
- Red-tailed wheatear
- Cyprus wheatear
- Desert wheatear
- Finsch's wheatear
- Heuglin's wheatear
- Black-eared wheatear
- Isabelline wheatear
- White-crowned wheatear
- Black wheatear
- Mourning wheatear
- Arabian wheatear
- Red-rumped wheatear
- Hooded wheatear
- Mountain wheatear
- Northern wheatear
- Somali wheatear
- Variable wheatear
- Capped wheatear
- Pied wheatear
- Kurdish wheatear
- Daurian redstart
- Blue-capped redstart
- Güldenstädt's redstart
- Eversmann's redstart
- Blue-fronted redstart
- Hodgson's redstart
- Moussier's redstart
- Black redstart
- Common redstart
- White-throated redstart
- White-starred robin
- Eyebrowed jungle flycatcher
- Fulvous-chested jungle flycatcher
- Russet-backed jungle flycatcher
- Rufous-tailed jungle flycatcher
- Plumbeous water redstart
- Pied bush chat
- Grey bush chat
- Jerdon's bush chat
- White-tailed stonechat
- Whinchat
- Réunion stonechat
- African stonechat
- Indian robin
- Equatorial akalat
- Bocage's akalat
- Lowland akalat
- Sharpe's akalat
- Fiscal flycatcher
- Forest robin
- Golden bush robin
- Red-flanked bluetail
- Rufous-breasted bush robin
- White-browed bush robin
- Collared bush robin
- Mocking cliff chat
- Angolan cave chat

=== Cinclidae ===
Dippers

- White-throated dipper
- White-capped dipper
- American dipper
- Brown dipper

=== Chloropseidae ===
Leafbirds

- Golden-fronted leafbird
- Blue-winged leafbird
- Orange-bellied leafbird
- Jerdon's leafbird
- Bornean leafbird
- Sumatran leafbird
- Yellow-throated leafbird
- Greater green leafbird

=== Dicaeidae ===
Flowerpeckers

- Midget flowerpecker
- Striped flowerpecker
- Thick-billed flowerpecker
- Golden-rumped flowerpecker
- Yellow-sided flowerpecker
- Red-keeled flowerpecker
- Bicoloured flowerpecker
- Grey-sided flowerpecker
- Yellow-vented flowerpecker
- Nilgiri flowerpecker
- Scarlet-backed flowerpecker
- Pale-billed flowerpecker
- Flame-breasted flowerpecker
- Red-banded flowerpecker
- Red-capped flowerpecker
- Mistletoebird
- Buzzing flowerpecker
- Black-fronted flowerpecker
- Fire-breasted flowerpecker
- Blue-cheeked flowerpecker
- Yellow-bellied flowerpecker
- Black-sided flowerpecker
- Crimson-crowned flowerpecker
- Olive-capped flowerpecker
- Louisiade flowerpecker
- Olive-crowned flowerpecker
- Pygmy flowerpecker
- Blood-breasted flowerpecker
- Orange-bellied flowerpecker
- Mottled flowerpecker
- Scarlet-headed flowerpecker
- Ashy flowerpecker
- Yellow-breasted flowerpecker
- Olive-backed flowerpecker
- Crimson-breasted flowerpecker
- Palawan flowerpecker
- Yellow-rumped flowerpecker

=== Nectariniidae ===
Sunbirds

- Handsome sunbird
- Apo sunbird
- Fork-tailed sunbird
- White-flanked sunbird
- Flaming sunbird
- Mrs. Gould's sunbird
- Fire-tailed sunbird
- Javan sunbird
- Green-tailed sunbird
- Grey-hooded sunbird
- Metallic-winged sunbird
- Black-throated sunbird
- Lovely sunbird
- Crimson sunbird
- Príncipe sunbird
- Newton's sunbird
- Reichenbach's sunbird
- Orange-breasted sunbird
- Anchieta's sunbird
- Violet-tailed sunbird
- Collared sunbird
- Mangrove sunbird
- Western violet-backed sunbird
- Brown-throated sunbird
- Uluguru violet-backed sunbird
- Eastern violet-backed sunbird
- Grey-chinned sunbird
- Plain sunbird
- Streaky-breasted spiderhunter
- Yellow-eared spiderhunter
- Naked-faced spiderhunter
- Thick-billed spiderhunter
- Bornean spiderhunter
- Spectacled spiderhunter
- Whitehead's spiderhunter
- Little spiderhunter
- Streaked spiderhunter
- Long-billed spiderhunter
- Ruby-cheeked sunbird
- Forest double-collared sunbird
- Grey-headed sunbird
- Fraser's sunbird
- Nile Valley sunbird
- Pygmy sunbird
- Purple-naped sunbird
- Buff-throated sunbird
- Greater double-collared sunbird
- Blue-headed sunbird
- Amethyst sunbird
- Purple sunbird
- Black sunbird
- Socotra sunbird
- Bannerman's sunbird
- Bates's sunbird
- Purple-banded sunbird
- Bocage's sunbird
- Orange-tufted sunbird
- Apricot-breasted sunbird
- Copper-throated sunbird
- Violet-breasted sunbird
- Southern double-collared sunbird
- Olive-bellied sunbird
- Splendid sunbird
- Anjouan sunbird
- Congo sunbird
- Mayotte sunbird
- Copper sunbird
- Blue-throated brown sunbird
- Seychelles sunbird
- Red-chested sunbird
- Malachite sunbird
- Carmelite sunbird
- Dusky sunbird
- Shining sunbird
- Humblot's sunbird
- Hunter's sunbird
- Johanna's sunbird
- Scarlet-tufted sunbird
- Olive-backed sunbird
- Bronzy sunbird
- Loten's sunbird
- Miombo double-collared sunbird
- Marico sunbird
- Eastern double-collared sunbird
- Crimson-backed sunbird
- Tiny sunbird
- Black-bellied sunbird
- Malagasy green sunbird
- Olive sunbird
- Cameroon sunbird
- Palestine sunbird
- Oustalet's sunbird
- Pemba sunbird
- Northern double-collared sunbird
- Beautiful sunbird
- Purple-breasted sunbird
- Regal sunbird
- Golden-winged sunbird
- Green-throated sunbird
- Little green sunbird
- Scarlet-chested sunbird
- Shelley's sunbird
- Flame-breasted sunbird
- Souimanga sunbird
- Purple-throated sunbird
- Superb sunbird
- Tacazze sunbird
- White-bellied sunbird
- Variable sunbird
- Grey sunbird
- Green-headed sunbird
- Purple-rumped sunbird

=== Passeridae ===
Old World sparrows

- Pale rockfinch
- Sahel bush sparrow
- Yellow-spotted bush sparrow
- Yellow-throated bush sparrow
- Yellow-throated sparrow
- Cinnamon ibon
- Black-winged snowfinch
- White-winged snowfinch
- Tibetan snowfinch
- White-rumped snowfinch
- Saxaul sparrow
- Somali sparrow
- Kordofan sparrow
- Southern grey-headed sparrow
- House sparrow
- Chestnut sparrow
- Arabian golden sparrow
- Plain-backed sparrow
- Parrot-billed sparrow
- Northern grey-headed sparrow
- Spanish sparrow
- Iago sparrow
- Socotra sparrow
- Sudan golden sparrow
- Cape sparrow
- Dead Sea sparrow
- Eurasian tree sparrow
- Great sparrow
- Sind sparrow
- Kenya sparrow
- Russet sparrow
- Shelley's sparrow
- Desert sparrow
- Swahili sparrow
- Swainson's sparrow
- Zarudny's sparrow
- Rock sparrow
- Blanford's snowfinch
- Père David's snowfinch
- Rufous-necked snowfinch
- Afghan snowfinch

=== Ploceidae ===
Weavers and allies

- Thick-billed weaver
- Red-headed weaver
- Bob-tailed weaver
- White-billed buffalo weaver
- Red-billed buffalo weaver
- White-headed buffalo weaver
- Yellow-crowned bishop
- White-winged widowbird
- Red-collared widowbird
- Golden-backed bishop
- Fan-tailed widowbird
- Yellow bishop
- Fire-fronted bishop
- Northern red bishop
- Black bishop
- Marsh widowbird
- Black-winged red bishop
- Yellow-mantled widowbird
- Zanzibar red bishop
- Southern red bishop
- Long-tailed widowbird
- Montane widowbird
- Red-headed fody
- Red fody
- Forest fody
- Rufous-tailed weaver
- Cassin's malimbe
- Red-crowned malimbe
- Red-bellied malimbe
- Crested malimbe
- Blue-billed malimbe
- Rachel's malimbe
- Red-headed malimbe
- Red-vented malimbe
- Sociable weaver
- Donaldson Smith's sparrow-weaver
- White-browed sparrow-weaver
- Chestnut-backed sparrow-weaver
- Chestnut-crowned sparrow-weaver
- Maxwell's black weaver
- Strange weaver
- Bar-winged weaver
- Orange weaver
- Cinnamon weaver
- Baglafecht weaver
- Black-breasted weaver
- Bertram's weaver
- Dark-backed weaver
- Golden palm weaver
- Cape weaver
- Taveta weaver
- Northern brown-throated weaver
- Village weaver
- Juba weaver
- Yellow-capped weaver
- Rüppell's weaver
- Giant weaver
- Heuglin's masked weaver
- Brown-capped weaver
- Lesser masked weaver
- Golden-backed weaver
- Katanga masked weaver
- Little weaver
- Streaked weaver
- Black-headed weaver
- Black-billed weaver
- Nelicourvi weaver
- Vieillot's black weaver
- Black-necked weaver
- Black-chinned weaver
- Spectacled weaver
- Slender-billed weaver
- Baya weaver
- Preuss's weaver
- Príncipe weaver
- Tanzanian masked weaver
- Chestnut weaver
- Lufira masked weaver
- Sakalava weaver
- São Tomé weaver
- Speke's weaver
- Eastern golden weaver
- Compact weaver
- Northern masked weaver
- Bocage's weaver
- Yellow-mantled weaver
- Southern masked weaver
- Vitelline masked weaver
- Weyns's weaver
- Holub's golden weaver
- Southern brown-throated weaver
- Grey-capped social weaver
- Black-capped social weaver
- Speckle-fronted weaver
- Scaly-feathered weaver
- Cardinal quelea
- Red-headed quelea
- Red-billed quelea

=== Estrildidae ===
Waxbills, munias, and allies

- Plum-headed finch
- Red-headed finch
- Cut-throat finch
- Red avadavat
- Orange-breasted waxbill
- Gouldian finch
- Brown twinspot
- Dusky crimsonwing
- Red-faced crimsonwing
- Abyssinian crimsonwing
- Painted finch
- Star finch
- Red-eared parrotfinch
- Red-headed parrotfinch
- Tawny-breasted parrotfinch
- Papuan parrotfinch
- Fiji parrotfinch
- Pin-tailed parrotfinch
- Red-throated parrotfinch
- Blue-faced parrotfinch
- Tricolored parrotfinch
- Green-faced parrotfinch
- Common waxbill
- Black-headed waxbill
- Lavender waxbill
- Black-cheeked waxbill
- Black-faced waxbill
- Swee waxbill
- Orange-cheeked waxbill
- Black-crowned waxbill
- Fawn-breasted waxbill
- Grey waxbill
- Crimson-rumped waxbill
- Arabian waxbill
- Cinderella waxbill
- Black-rumped waxbill
- Dusky twinspot
- Dybowski's twinspot
- Pictorella mannikin
- Pink-throated twinspot
- Red-throated twinspot
- Landana firefinch
- Black-faced firefinch
- Brown firefinch
- Black-bellied firefinch
- Jameson's firefinch
- African firefinch
- Bar-breasted firefinch
- Rock firefinch
- Red-billed firefinch
- Mali firefinch
- Chestnut munia
- Grey-headed mannikin
- African silverbill
- Chestnut-breasted mannikin
- White-capped munia
- Yellow-rumped mannikin
- Forbes's mannikin
- Dusky munia
- Great-billed mannikin
- Hunstein's mannikin
- Black-throated munia
- White-bellied munia
- Javan munia
- White-spotted mannikin
- White-headed munia
- Indian silverbill
- Tricoloured munia
- Buff-bellied mannikin
- Black-faced munia
- Western alpine mannikin
- Eastern alpine mannikin
- Madagascan mannikin
- Grey-crowned mannikin
- New Hanover mannikin
- Red-backed mannikin
- Pale-headed munia
- Scaly-breasted munia
- Five-coloured munia
- Hooded mannikin
- White-rumped munia
- Black mannikin
- Black-breasted mannikin
- Streak-headed mannikin
- Grey-banded mannikin
- Green-backed twinspot
- Crimson finch
- Red-browed finch
- White-collared oliveback
- Grey-headed oliveback
- Shelley's oliveback
- Chestnut-breasted nigrita
- Grey-headed nigrita
- White-breasted nigrita
- Pale-fronted nigrita
- Mountain firetail
- Black-faced quailfinch
- Locust finch
- Jameson's antpecker
- Woodhouse's antpecker
- Long-tailed finch
- Black-throated finch
- Masked finch
- Lesser seedcracker
- Black-bellied seedcracker
- Crimson seedcracker
- Orange-winged pytilia
- Yellow-winged pytilia
- Green-winged pytilia
- Red-winged pytilia
- Black-and-white mannikin
- Bronze mannikin
- Magpie mannikin
- Grey-headed silverbill
- Western bluebill
- Grant's bluebill
- Red-headed bluebill
- Beautiful firetail
- Diamond firetail
- Red-eared firetail
- Double-barred finch
- Australian zebra finch
- Sunda zebra finch
- Blue waxbill
- Red-cheeked cordon-bleu
- Blue-capped cordon-bleu
- Violet-eared waxbill
- Purple grenadier

=== Viduidae ===
Indigobirds and whydahs

- Cuckoo-finch
- Cameroon indigobird
- Village indigobird
- Zambezi indigobird
- Straw-tailed whydah
- Dusky indigobird
- Steel-blue whydah
- Exclamatory paradise whydah
- Barka indigobird
- Pin-tailed whydah
- Jos Plateau indigobird
- Quailfinch indigobird
- Broad-tailed paradise whydah
- Long-tailed paradise whydah
- Purple indigobird
- Jambandu indigobird
- Shaft-tailed whydah
- Togo paradise whydah
- Wilson's indigobird

=== Peucedramidae ===
Olive warbler (monotypic)

- Olive warbler

=== Prunellidae ===
Accentors

- Black-throated accentor
- Alpine accentor
- Brown accentor
- Altai accentor
- Maroon-backed accentor
- Kozlov's accentor
- Dunnock
- Siberian accentor
- Radde's accentor
- Robin accentor
- Japanese accentor
- Rufous-breasted accentor

=== Motacillidae ===
Wagtails and pipits

- South Georgia pipit
- Berthelot's pipit
- Paramo pipit
- Short-tailed pipit
- Bushveld pipit
- Tawny pipit
- Red-throated pipit
- Pampas pipit
- Correndera pipit
- Short-billed pipit
- Blyth's pipit
- Pechora pipit
- Alpine pipit
- Hellmayr's pipit
- Olive-backed pipit
- Plain-backed pipit
- Striped pipit
- Yellowish pipit
- Malindi pipit
- Australasian pipit
- Long-legged pipit
- Eurasian rock pipit
- Meadow pipit
- Richard's pipit
- Rosy pipit
- Buff-bellied pipit
- Paddyfield pipit
- Long-billed pipit
- Water pipit
- Upland pipit
- Tree pipit
- Buffy pipit
- Forest wagtail
- Rosy-throated longclaw
- Pangani longclaw
- Cape longclaw
- Yellow-throated longclaw
- Fülleborn's longclaw
- Grimwood's longclaw
- African pied wagtail
- White wagtail
- Cape wagtail
- Grey wagtail
- Citrine wagtail
- Mountain wagtail
- Western yellow wagtail
- Madagascan wagtail
- Japanese wagtail
- White-browed wagtail
- Golden pipit

=== Urocynchramidae ===
Przevalski's finch (monotypic)

- Przevalski's finch

=== Fringillidae ===
Finches and euphonias

- Redpoll
- Blanford's rosefinch
- Trumpeter finch
- Mongolian finch
- Spectacled finch
- European goldfinch
- Grey-capped goldfinch
- Citril finch
- Corsican finch
- Dark-rumped rosefinch
- Pink-rumped rosefinch
- Common rosefinch
- Himalayan beautiful rosefinch
- Red-fronted rosefinch
- Red-mantled rosefinch
- Tibetan rosefinch
- Pink-browed rosefinch
- Spot-winged rosefinch
- Pallas's rosefinch
- Great rosefinch
- Streaked rosefinch
- Sinai rosefinch
- Himalayan white-browed rosefinch
- Three-banded rosefinch
- Vinaceous rosefinch
- Black-headed greenfinch
- European greenfinch
- Vietnamese greenfinch
- Grey-capped greenfinch
- Yellow-breasted greenfinch
- Hawaiʻi ʻamakihi
- Golden-browed chlorophonia
- Blue-naped chlorophonia
- Golden-rumped euphonia
- Elegant euphonia
- Yellow-collared chlorophonia
- Hispaniolan euphonia
- Blue-crowned chlorophonia
- Chestnut-breasted chlorophonia
- Mountain serin
- Mindanao serin
- Hawfinch
- White-throated canary
- Black-throated canary
- Southern grosbeak-canary
- Thick-billed seedeater
- West African seedeater
- Black-faced canary
- African citril
- Lemon-breasted canary
- Northern grosbeak-canary
- White-bellied canary
- Yellow canary
- Western citril
- Streaky-headed seedeater
- Southern citril
- Papyrus canary
- White-rumped seedeater
- Yemen serin
- Black-eared seedeater
- Kipengere seedeater
- Yellow-fronted canary
- Reichard's seedeater
- Reichenow's seedeater
- Arabian serin
- Principe seedeater
- Forest canary
- Stripe-breasted seedeater
- Streaky seedeater
- Brimstone canary
- Drakensberg siskin
- Cape siskin
- Brown-rumped seedeater
- Yellow-rumped seedeater
- Chinese grosbeak
- Japanese grosbeak
- Scrub euphonia
- Tawny-capped euphonia
- Golden-sided euphonia
- Green-chinned euphonia
- Purple-throated euphonia
- White-lored euphonia
- Velvet-fronted euphonia
- Finsch's euphonia
- Fulvous-vented euphonia
- Olive-backed euphonia
- Yellow-throated euphonia
- Spot-crowned euphonia
- Jamaican euphonia
- Thick-billed euphonia
- Yellow-crowned euphonia
- Bronze-green euphonia
- White-vented euphonia
- Chestnut-bellied euphonia
- Plumbeous euphonia
- Rufous-bellied euphonia
- Orange-crowned euphonia
- Trinidad euphonia
- Violaceous euphonia
- Orange-bellied euphonia
- Common chaffinch
- Brambling
- Scarlet finch
- Cassin's finch
- House finch
- Purple finch
- Hooded grosbeak
- ʻApapane
- Asian rosy finch
- Black rosy finch
- Brandt's mountain finch
- Plain mountain finch
- Gray-crowned rosy finch
- Common linnet
- Twite
- Yemen linnet
- Oriole finch
- Red crossbill
- Two-barred crossbill
- Parrot crossbill
- Scottish crossbill
- Collared grosbeak
- White-winged grosbeak
- Black-and-yellow grosbeak
- Spot-winged grosbeak
- Pine grosbeak
- Crimson-browed finch
- Dark-breasted rosefinch
- Golden-naped finch
- Orange bullfinch
- Grey-headed bullfinch
- Red-headed bullfinch
- White-cheeked bullfinch
- Brown bullfinch
- Eurasian bullfinch
- African crimson-winged finch
- Eurasian crimson-winged finch
- Desert finch
- Socotra golden-winged grosbeak
- Black-headed canary
- Atlantic canary
- Cape canary
- Yellow-crowned canary
- Ethiopian siskin
- Red-fronted serin
- European serin
- Black siskin
- Black-capped siskin
- Black-chinned siskin
- Thick-billed siskin
- Antillean siskin
- Lawrence's goldfinch
- Hooded siskin
- Black-headed siskin
- Olivaceous siskin
- Pine siskin
- Lesser goldfinch
- Saffron siskin
- Andean siskin
- Eurasian siskin
- Tibetan serin
- American goldfinch
- Yellow-rumped siskin
- Yellow-bellied siskin
- Long-tailed rosefinch

=== Calcariidae ===
Longspurs and allies

- Lapland longspur
- Smith's longspur
- McKay's bunting
- Snow bunting
- Thick-billed longspur

=== Rhodinocichlidae ===
Thrush-tanager (monotypic)

- Rosy thrush-tanager

=== Emberizidae ===
Buntings

- Brown-rumped bunting
- Red-headed bunting
- Grey-necked bunting
- Cabanis's bunting
- Cretzschmar's bunting
- Corn bunting
- Cape bunting
- Yellow-browed bunting
- Rock bunting
- Meadow bunting
- Cirl bunting
- Yellowhammer
- Yellow-throated bunting
- Golden-breasted bunting
- Chestnut-eared bunting
- Godlewski's bunting
- Ortolan bunting
- Lark-like bunting
- Tibetan bunting
- Crested bunting
- Pine bunting
- Black-headed bunting
- Pallas's reed bunting
- Somali bunting
- Little bunting
- Rustic bunting
- Chestnut bunting
- Common reed bunting
- Slaty bunting
- Black-faced bunting
- White-capped bunting
- Striolated bunting
- Yellow bunting
- Cinnamon-breasted bunting
- Tristram's bunting
- Grey bunting

=== Passerellidae ===
New World sparrows

- Oaxaca sparrow
- Rusty sparrow
- Rufous-crowned sparrow
- Yellow-browed sparrow
- Grassland sparrow
- Grasshopper sparrow
- LeConte's sparrow
- Seaside sparrow
- Nelson's sparrow
- Black-throated sparrow
- Five-striped sparrow
- Bell's sparrow
- Sagebrush sparrow
- White-headed brush finch
- White-naped brush finch
- Moustached brush finch
- Cuzco brush finch
- Yellow-striped brush finch
- Apurímac brush finch
- Fulvous-headed brush finch
- Yellow-breasted brush finch
- White-rimmed brush finch
- White-winged brush finch
- Santa Marta brush finch
- Grey-eared brush finch
- Rusty-bellied brush finch
- Pale-naped brush finch
- Tepui brush finch
- Rufous-capped brush finch
- Rufous-eared brushfinch
- Bolivian brush finch
- Slaty brush finch
- Bay-crowned brush finch
- Ochre-breasted brush finch
- Tricolored brush finch
- Black-capped sparrow
- Orange-billed sparrow
- Chestnut-capped brush finch
- Sooty-faced finch
- Saffron-billed sparrow
- Golden-winged sparrow
- Half-collared sparrow
- Pectoral sparrow
- White-browed brush finch
- Green-striped brush finch
- Green-backed sparrow
- Black-striped sparrow
- Olive sparrow
- Tocuyo sparrow
- Lark bunting
- Baird's sparrow
- Henslow's sparrow
- Ashy-throated bush tanager
- Yellow-throated bush tanager
- Pirre bush tanager
- Common bush tanager
- Yellow-whiskered bush tanager
- Sooty-capped bush tanager
- Dusky bush tanager
- Tacarcuna bush tanager
- Lark sparrow
- Dark-eyed junco
- Yellow-eyed junco
- Volcano junco
- Swamp sparrow
- Lincoln's sparrow
- Song sparrow
- Abert's towhee
- White-throated towhee
- Prevost's ground sparrow
- California towhee
- Canyon towhee
- Rusty-crowned ground sparrow
- White-eared ground sparrow
- Tanager finch
- Striped sparrow
- Savannah sparrow
- Red fox sparrow
- Thick-billed fox sparrow
- Slate-colored fox sparrow
- Sooty fox sparrow
- Botteri's sparrow
- Rufous-winged sparrow
- Cassin's sparrow
- Black-chested sparrow
- Bridled sparrow
- Stripe-headed sparrow
- Large-footed finch
- Green-tailed towhee
- Eastern towhee
- Spotted towhee
- Collared towhee
- Vesper sparrow
- Yellow-thighed brushfinch
- Tumbes sparrow
- Chaco sparrow
- Black-chinned sparrow
- Brewer's sparrow
- Clay-colored sparrow
- Chipping sparrow
- Field sparrow
- American tree sparrow
- White-throated sparrow
- Golden-crowned sparrow
- Rufous-collared sparrow
- White-crowned sparrow
- Harris's sparrow

=== Phaenicophilidae ===
Hispaniolan palm-tanagers

- Green-tailed warbler
- Black-crowned palm-tanager

=== Spindalidae ===
Spindalises

- Hispaniolan spindalis
- Jamaican spindalis
- Puerto Rican spindalis
- Western spindalis

=== Zeledoniidae ===
Wrenthrush (monotypic)

- Wrenthrush

=== Teretistridae ===
Cuban warblers

- Yellow-headed warbler
- Oriente warbler

=== Icteriidae ===
Yellow-breasted chat (monotypic)

- Yellow-breasted chat

=== Icteridae ===
Oropendolas, New World orioles, and blackbirds

- Grayish baywing
- Pale baywing
- Red-shouldered blackbird
- Tawny-shouldered blackbird
- Red-winged blackbird
- Unicoloured blackbird
- Yellow-winged blackbird
- Pale-eyed blackbird
- Yellow-billed cacique
- Scarlet-headed blackbird
- Yellow-rumped cacique
- Mountain cacique
- Golden-winged cacique
- Red-rumped cacique
- Ecuadorian cacique
- Solitary cacique
- Scarlet-rumped cacique
- Mexican cacique
- Yellow-hooded blackbird
- Chestnut-capped blackbird
- Casqued oropendola
- Austral blackbird
- Melodious blackbird
- Scrub blackbird
- Bobolink
- Brewer's blackbird
- Chopi blackbird
- Oriole blackbird
- Black-backed oriole
- Orange oriole
- Orange-crowned oriole
- Bullock's oriole
- Epaulet oriole
- Yellow-backed oriole
- Orange-backed troupial
- Hooded oriole
- Hispaniolan oriole
- Baltimore oriole
- White-edged oriole
- Audubon's oriole
- Altamira oriole
- Venezuelan troupial
- Campo troupial
- Jamaican oriole
- Bar-winged oriole
- Cuban oriole
- Yellow-tailed oriole
- Yellow oriole
- Scott's oriole
- Spot-breasted oriole
- Puerto Rican oriole
- Black-cowled oriole
- Streak-backed oriole
- Variable oriole
- Orchard oriole
- Black-vented oriole
- Velvet-fronted grackle
- Peruvian meadowlark
- Long-tailed meadowlark
- Red-breasted blackbird
- White-browed blackbird
- Golden-tufted mountain grackle
- Bronzed cowbird
- Brown-headed cowbird
- Shiny cowbird
- Giant cowbird
- Screaming cowbird
- Band-tailed oropendola
- Bolivian blackbird
- Russet-backed oropendola
- Dusky-green oropendola
- Olive oropendola
- Crested oropendola
- Black oropendola
- Montezuma oropendola
- Green oropendola
- Chestnut-headed oropendola
- Yellow-rumped marshbird
- Brown-and-yellow marshbird
- Cuban blackbird
- Carib grackle
- Boat-tailed grackle
- Great-tailed grackle
- Nicaraguan grackle
- Greater Antillean grackle
- Western meadowlark
- Yellow-headed blackbird

=== Parulidae ===
New World warblers

- Golden-browed warbler
- Golden-crowned warbler
- White-bellied warbler
- Fan-tailed warbler
- Black-cheeked warbler
- Black-eared warbler
- Yungas warbler
- Rufous-capped warbler
- Tacaruna warbler
- Three-banded warbler
- Three-striped warbler
- Canada warbler
- Wilson's warbler
- Red warbler
- Red-faced warbler
- Pink-headed warbler
- Masked yellowthroat
- Kentucky warbler
- Hooded yellowthroat
- Mourning warbler
- Grey-crowned yellowthroat
- Bahama yellowthroat
- Olive-crowned yellowthroat
- Common yellowthroat
- MacGillivray's warbler
- Worm-eating warbler
- Orange-crowned warbler
- Colima warbler
- Lucy's warbler
- Tennessee warbler
- Nashville warbler
- Virginia's warbler
- Swainson's warbler
- Black-and-white warbler
- White-faced whitestart
- Brown-capped whitestart
- Guaiquinima whitestart
- Tepui whitestart
- Yellow-crowned whitestart
- Spectacled whitestart
- Slate-throated whitestart
- Golden-fronted whitestart
- Painted whitestart
- Collared whitestart
- Two-banded warbler
- Choco warbler
- Golden-bellied warbler
- Grey-throated warbler
- Russet-crowned warbler
- Flavescent warbler
- Buff-rumped warbler
- Grey-and-gold warbler
- White-rimmed warbler
- White-striped warbler
- Citrine warbler
- Black-crested warbler
- Riverbank warbler
- Roraiman warbler
- Pale-legged warbler
- Connecticut warbler
- Flame-throated warbler
- Crescent-chested warbler
- Louisiana waterthrush
- Northern waterthrush
- Prothonotary warbler
- Ovenbird
- Adelaide's warbler
- Northern parula
- Black-throated blue warbler
- Bay-breasted warbler
- Hooded warbler
- Yellow-rumped warbler
- Saint Lucia warbler
- Prairie warbler
- Yellow-throated warbler
- Blackburnian warbler
- Grace's warbler
- Magnolia warbler
- Black-throated gray warbler
- Hermit warbler
- Palm warbler
- Chestnut-sided warbler
- American yellow warbler
- Arrowhead warbler
- Pine warbler
- Tropical parula
- Olive-capped warbler
- Plumbeous warbler
- American redstart
- Blackpoll warbler
- Cape May warbler
- Townsend's warbler
- Black-throated green warbler
- Blue-winged warbler

=== Mitrospingidae ===
Mitrospingid tanagers

- Red-billed pied tanager
- Dusky-faced tanager
- Olive-backed tanager
- Olive-green tanager

=== Cardinalidae ===
Cardinals and allies

- Blackish-blue seedeater (this taxon, lumped by the IUCN, also contains Blue seedeater and Carrizal seedeater).
- Northern cardinal
- Vermilion cardinal
- Pyrrhuloxia
- Yellow-green grosbeak
- Black-faced grosbeak
- Carmiol's tanager
- Yellow-lored tanager
- Lemon-spectacled tanager
- Ochre-breasted tanager
- Blue bunting
- Ultramarine grosbeak
- Blue-black grosbeak
- Glaucous-blue grosbeak
- Amazonian grosbeak
- Crested ant tanager
- Red-throated ant tanager
- Sooty ant tanager
- Rose-breasted chat
- Grey-throated chat
- Red-breasted chat
- Red-crowned ant tanager
- Lazuli bunting
- Blue grosbeak
- Painted bunting
- Indigo bunting
- Orange-breasted bunting
- Varied bunting
- Crimson-collared grosbeak
- Red-and-black grosbeak
- Black-backed grosbeak
- Golden grosbeak
- Yellow grosbeak
- Rose-breasted grosbeak
- Black-headed grosbeak
- Black-thighed grosbeak
- Flame-colored tanager
- Red-headed tanager
- Hepatic tanager
- White-winged tanager
- Western tanager
- Scarlet tanager
- Rose-throated tanager
- Summer tanager
- Red-hooded tanager
- Dickcissel

=== Thraupidae ===
Tanagers and allies

- Peg-billed finch
- Scarlet-bellied mountain tanager
- Lacrimose mountain tanager
- Santa Marta mountain tanager
- Black-chinned mountain tanager
- Blue-winged mountain tanager
- Sooty grassquit
- Dull-coloured grassquit
- Moss-backed tanager
- Black-and-gold tanager
- Golden-chested tanager
- Hooded mountain tanager
- Vermilion tanager
- Small tree finch
- Bay-chested warbling finch
- Plushcap
- Band-tailed seedeater
- Paramo seedeater
- Plain-coloured seedeater
- Grey warbler-finch
- Orange-eared tanager
- Glistening-green tanager
- Green honeycreeper
- Grass-green tanager
- Black-and-yellow tanager
- Scarlet-and-white tanager
- Magpie tanager
- Black-chested mountain tanager
- Grey-hooded bush tanager
- Bananaquit
- Scarlet-throated tanager
- Capped conebill
- Cinereous conebill
- White-browed conebill
- White-eared conebill
- Rufous-browed conebill
- Blue-backed conebill
- Chestnut-vented conebill
- Tamarugo conebill
- Black-and-white tanager
- Red pileated finch
- Grey pileated finch
- Slaty tanager
- Rufous-crested tanager
- Purple honeycreeper
- Red-legged honeycreeper
- Shining honeycreeper
- Short-billed honeycreeper
- Blue-backed tanager
- White-rumped tanager
- White-bellied dacnis
- Scarlet-breasted dacnis
- Blue dacnis
- Yellow-bellied dacnis
- Black-faced dacnis
- Scarlet-thighed dacnis
- Viridian dacnis
- White-sided flowerpiercer
- Cinnamon-bellied flowerpiercer
- Black-throated flowerpiercer
- Bluish flowerpiercer
- Grey-bellied flowerpiercer
- Masked flowerpiercer
- Scaled flowerpiercer
- Deep-blue flowerpiercer
- Mérida flowerpiercer
- Black flowerpiercer
- Indigo flowerpiercer
- Glossy flowerpiercer
- Greater flowerpiercer
- Moustached flowerpiercer
- Slaty flowerpiercer
- Rusty flowerpiercer
- Diuca finch
- White-naped seedeater
- Long-tailed reed finch
- Chestnut-bellied mountain tanager
- Streak-crowned mountain tanager
- Buff-breasted mountain tanager
- Wedge-tailed grass finch
- Lesser grass finch
- Serra finch
- Pampa finch
- Orangequit
- Grey-headed tanager
- Large cactus finch
- Sharp-beaked ground finch
- Medium ground finch
- Small ground finch
- Large ground finch
- Common cactus finch
- Ash-breasted sierra finch
- Plumbeous sierra finch
- Slaty finch
- Uniform finch
- Inti tanager
- Yellow-backed tanager
- Guira tanager
- Rufous-headed tanager
- Sulphur-rumped tanager
- Scarlet-browed tanager
- Boulder finch
- Red-backed sierra finch
- White-throated sierra finch
- Glacier finch
- Buff-bridled Inca finch
- Grey-winged Inca finch
- Rufous-backed Inca finch
- Great Inca finch
- Golden-collared honeycreeper
- Yellow-throated tanager
- Golden-collared tanager
- Yellow-scarfed tanager
- Golden-crowned tanager
- Black-capped hemispingus
- White-browed hemispingus
- Orange-browed hemispingus
- Black-throated shrike-tanager
- Fulvous shrike-tanager
- White-throated shrike-tanager
- White-winged shrike-tanager
- Grey-crested finch
- Black-crested finch
- Flame-crested tanager
- White-shouldered tanager
- Yellow-crested tanager
- Barbados bullfinch
- Lesser Antillean bullfinch
- Yellow-shouldered grassquit
- White-bridled finch
- Yellow-bridled finch
- Black-faced grassquit
- Greater Antillean bullfinch
- Gray-throated warbling finch
- Cinereous warbling finch
- Rusty-browed warbling finch
- Buff-throated warbling finch
- Black-capped warbling finch
- Ringed warbling finch
- Three-striped hemispingus
- Hooded tanager
- Pardusco
- Chestnut-bellied seed finch
- Black-billed seed finch
- Large-billed seed finch
- Thick-billed seed finch
- Nicaraguan seed finch
- Yellow-shouldered grosbeak
- Crimson-fronted cardinal
- Yellow-billed cardinal
- Red-crested cardinal
- Red-cowled cardinal
- Red-capped cardinal
- Masked cardinal
- Cuban grassquit
- Band-tailed sierra finch
- Black-hooded sierra finch
- Grey-hooded sierra finch
- Patagonian sierra finch
- Peruvian sierra finch
- Cinereous finch
- Cocos finch
- Fawn-breasted tanager
- Vegetarian finch
- Tucumán mountain finch
- Bolivian warbling finch
- Collared warbling finch
- Black-and-rufous warbling finch
- Cinnamon warbling finch
- Rufous-browed hemispingus
- Black-and-chestnut warbling finch
- Chestnut-breasted mountain finch
- Rufous-sided warbling finch
- Rufous-bellied mountain tanager
- Black-headed hemispingus
- Drab hemispingus
- Chestnut-headed tanager
- Brazilian tanager
- Silver-beaked tanager
- Cherrie's tanager
- Crimson-backed tanager
- Flame-rumped tanager
- Huallaga tanager
- Masked crimson tanager
- Passerini's tanager
- Crimson-collared tanager
- Crimson-breasted finch
- Carbonated sierra finch
- Mourning sierra finch
- Lesser Antillean saltator
- Black-headed saltator
- Black-winged saltator
- Golden-billed saltator
- Masked saltator
- Greyish saltator
- Black-throated grosbeak
- Slate-coloured grosbeak
- Thick-billed saltator
- Buff-throated saltator
- Black-cowled saltator
- Orinoco saltator
- Green-winged saltator
- Streaked saltator
- Black-throated saltator
- Many-colored Chaco finch
- Black-faced tanager
- Cinnamon tanager
- Greater yellow finch
- Stripe-tailed yellow finch
- Orange-fronted yellow finch
- Saffron finch
- Patagonian yellow finch
- Puna yellow finch
- Citron-headed yellow finch
- Grassland yellow finch
- Greenish yellow finch
- Raimondi's yellow finch
- Sulphur-throated finch
- Bright-rumped yellow finch
- Oleaginous hemispingus
- Western hemispingus
- Piura hemispingus
- Black-eared hemispingus
- Blue-capped tanager
- White-throated seedeater
- Wing-barred seedeater
- Dubois's seedeater
- Copper seedeater
- Lesson's seedeater
- Double-collared seedeater
- Chestnut-bellied seedeater
- Rusty-collared seedeater
- Variable seedeater
- Tawny-bellied seedeater
- Grey seedeater
- White-bellied seedeater
- Lined seedeater
- Black-and-white seedeater
- Ruddy-breasted seedeater
- Caquetá seedeater
- Yellow-bellied seedeater
- Parrot-billed seedeater
- Plumbeous seedeater
- Slate-coloured seedeater
- Drab seedeater
- Chestnut-throated seedeater
- Cinnamon-rumped seedeater
- Diademed tanager
- Ruby-crowned tanager
- Tawny-crested tanager
- Red-shouldered tanager
- White-lined tanager
- Fulvous-crested tanager
- Golden tanager
- Opal-crowned tanager
- Burnished-buff tanager
- Paradise tanager
- Golden-eared tanager
- Lesser Antillean tanager
- Blue-necked tanager
- Red-necked tanager
- Black-headed tanager
- Blue-browed tanager
- Gilt-edged tanager
- Brassy-breasted tanager
- Spangle-cheeked tanager
- Emerald tanager
- Green-naped tanager
- Speckled tanager
- Bay-headed tanager
- Black-capped tanager
- Silver-throated tanager
- Plain-coloured tanager
- Blue-whiskered tanager
- Metallic-green tanager
- Golden-hooded tanager
- Rufous-winged tanager
- Turquoise tanager
- Masked tanager
- Beryl-spangled tanager
- Grey-and-gold tanager
- Flame-faced tanager
- Sira tanager
- Chestnut-backed tanager
- Spotted tanager
- Golden-naped tanager
- Rufous-cheeked tanager
- Rufous-throated tanager
- Green-and-gold tanager
- Green-headed tanager
- Dotted tanager
- Blue-and-black tanager
- Opal-rumped tanager
- Silver-backed tanager
- Scrub tanager
- Saffron-crowned tanager
- Yellow-bellied tanager
- Swallow tanager
- Fulvous-headed tanager
- Buff-bellied tanager
- Rufous-chested tanager
- Brown-flanked tanager
- Rust-and-yellow tanager
- Orange-headed tanager
- Superciliaried hemispingus
- Yellow-winged tanager
- Blue-and-yellow tanager
- Azure-shouldered tanager
- Blue-gray tanager
- Glaucous tanager
- Golden-chevroned tanager
- Palm tanager
- Sayaca tanager
- Yellow-faced grassquit
- Black-goggled tanager
- Black-backed bush tanager
- Blue-black grassquit
- Tit-like dacnis
- Streaked dacnis

== See also ==
- Lists of IUCN Red List least concern species
- List of near threatened birds
- List of vulnerable birds
- List of endangered birds
- List of critically endangered birds
- List of extinct bird species since 1500
- List of data deficient birds
