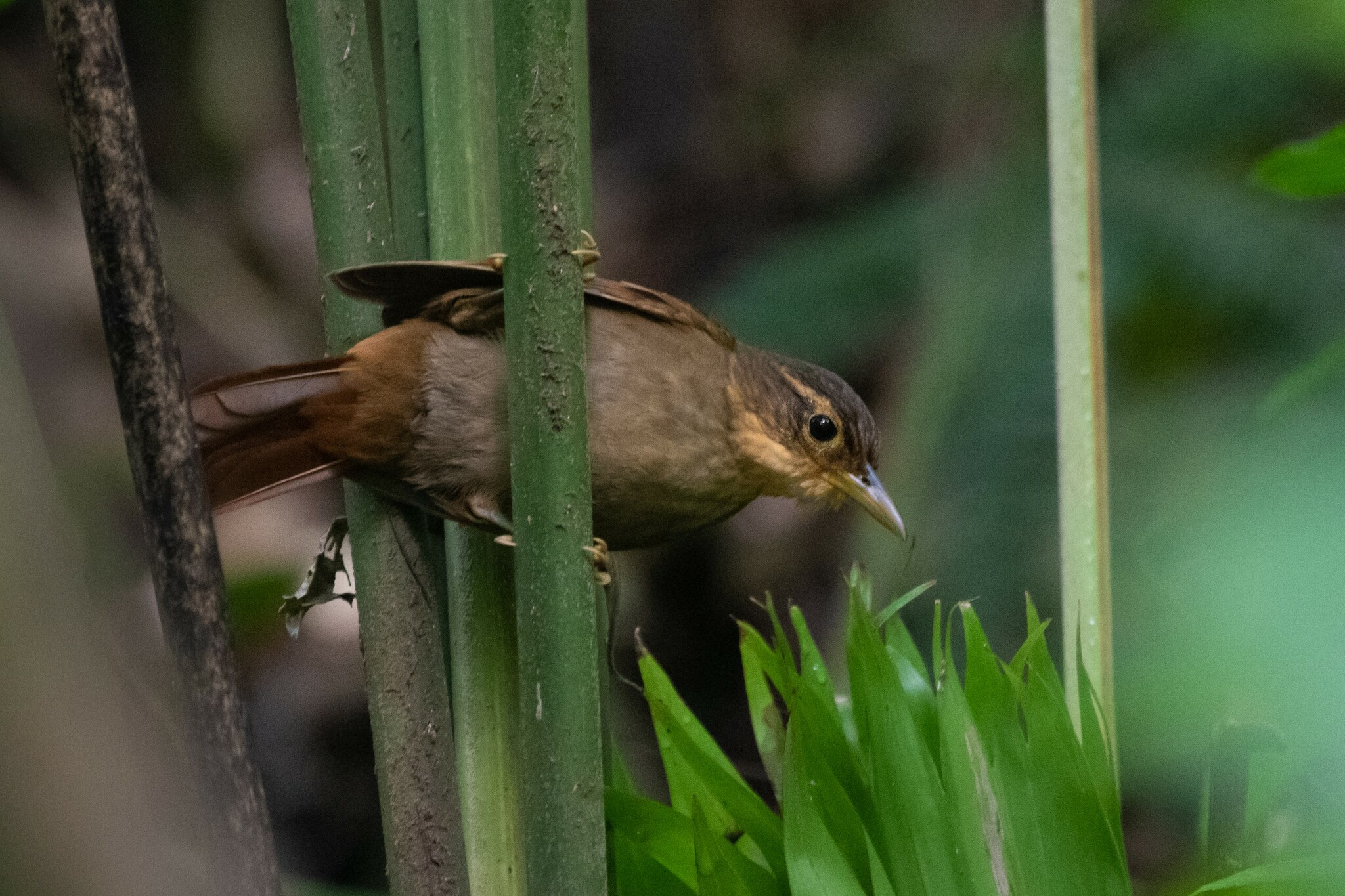

Scientific classification
- Kingdom: Animalia
- Phylum: Chordata
- Class: Aves
- Order: Passeriformes
- Family: Furnariidae
- Genus: Automolus
- Species: A. cervinigularis

Binomial name
- Automolus cervinigularis (Sclater, 1857)

= Fawn-throated foliage-gleaner =

Species of bird

The fawn-throated foliage-gleaner (Automolus cervinigularis) is a species of bird in the Furnariinae subfamily of the ovenbird family Furnariidae. It is found in Belize, Costa Rica, Guatemala, Honduras, Mexico, Nicaragua, and Panama.

== Taxonomy and systematics ==
The fawn-throated foliage-gleaner's taxonomy is unsettled. Until July 2023, the International Ornithological Committee (IOC) treated what are now the two subspecies of the fawn-throated foliage gleaner, with four other subspecies, as the buff-throated foliage gleaner. At that time the IOC split A. o. cervinigularis and A. o. hypophaeus from the buff-throated to form the new fawn-throated foliage-gleaner, which by the principle of priority took the binomial A. cervinigularis. The IOC renamed the remaining four subspecies the ochre-throated foliage-gleaner to avoid confusion with the former, larger, buff-throated species. It retains the former binomial A. ochrolaemus.

The Clements taxonomy had included a seventh subspecies, A. o. amusos (Peters, 1929), in the buff-throated foliage-gleaner. In October 2023 Clements accepted the same split as the IOC and deleted A. o. amusos entirely. The American Ornithological Society has not recognized the split.

BirdLife International's Handbook of the Birds of the World does not recognize the split of fawn-throated foliage-gleaner, nor does it recognize A. o. amusos. It includes A. o. exsertus as the seventh subspecies of its buff-throated foliage-gleaner. The IOC, Clements, and the American Ornithological Society previously recognized exsertus as a separate species, the Chiriqui foliage-gleaner.

The two subspecies of the fawn-throated foliage-gleaner are the nominate A. c. cervinigularis (Sclater, 1857) and A. c. hypophaeus (Ridgway, 1909).

== Description ==
The fawn-throated foliage-gleaner is 18 to 20 cm (7.1 to 7.9 in) long and weighs 30 to 46 g (1.1 to 1.6 oz). It is a fairly large member of its genus and has a heavy bill. The sexes have the same plumage. Adults of the nominate subspecies have a mostly dark brownish face with a bold buff eyering and stripe behind the eye, faint reddish streaks on the ear coverts, and an ochraceous-buff malar area with faint dark flecks. Their crown and nape are dark brown with a faint blackish brown scallop pattern. Their back and rump are rich dark brown that blends to rufous uppertail coverts. Their wing coverts are rich dark brown and their flight feathers slightly paler and more rufescent. Their tail is rufous. Their throat is deep buff, their breast has a dusky scaling pattern on buff, and their belly is dusky buff. Their undertail coverts are pale buff. Their iris is brown to dark brown, their maxilla dark gray, their mandible pale horn, and their legs and feet grayish. Subspecies A. c. hypophaeus is similar to the nominate, with a more ochraceous throat, a paler and mostly plain breast, and brighter rufous undertail coverts.

== Distribution and habitat ==
The nominate subspecies of the fawn-throated foliage-gleaner is found from Veracruz in southern Mexico south through western Belize into northern Guatemala. Subspecies A. c. hypophaeus is found on the Caribbean slope from eastern Nicaragua through Costa Rica into northwestern Panama. The species inhabits lowland rainforest, secondary forest, and also coffee plantations. In elevation it reaches from sea level to about 1,000 m (3,300 ft) in Mexico and 1,500 m (4,900 ft) further south.

== Behavior ==
=== Movement ===
The fawn-throated foliage-gleaner is a year-round resident throughout its range.

=== Feeding ===
The fawn-throated foliage-gleaner feeds mostly on a variety of insects, spiders, and vertebrates like small frogs. It forages singly or in pairs and often (perhaps usually) joins mixed-species feeding flocks. It forages in the forest's dense undergrowth and less often to its mid-storey, acrobatically gleaning and pulling prey from epiphytes, debris, and especially from clumps of dead leaves as it hops along branches and vines. It also forages on the ground by flipping aside leaf litter.

=== Breeding ===
The fawn-throated foliage-gleaner's breeding season has not been defined. It nests in a burrow excavated in an earthen bank. Its clutch size is two or three eggs. Nothing else is known about its breeding biology.

=== Vocalization ===
The fawn-throated foliage-gleaner's song is "a descending chortling rattle of 1-1.5 secs duration, often repeated steadily", and is sung mostly at dawn and dusk. It is also described as "a sputtering, nasal trill that slows and drops slightly at the end". Its calls include a "low, gruff shuk, a sharp, nasal pe-duk, and a hard tchehrr".

== Status ==
The IUCN follows BirdLife International's taxonomy and so has assessed the pre-split buff-throated foliage gleaner as a whole, with no separate evaluation of the two fawn-throated foliage-gleaner subspecies.
