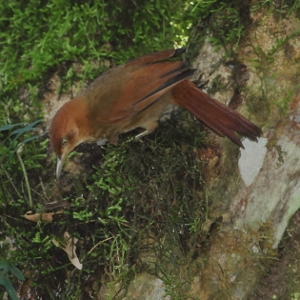
- at Jacutinga, Minas Gerais State, Brazil

Conservation status
- Least Concern (IUCN 3.1)

Scientific classification
- Kingdom: Animalia
- Phylum: Chordata
- Class: Aves
- Order: Passeriformes
- Family: Furnariidae
- Genus: Clibanornis
- Species: C. rectirostris

Binomial name
- Clibanornis rectirostris (Wied, 1831)

Synonyms
- Automolus rubidus Hylocryptus restirostris

= Henna-capped foliage-gleaner =

Species of bird

The henna-capped foliage-gleaner or chestnut-capped foliage-gleaner (Clibanornis rectirostris) is a species of bird in the Furnariinae subfamily of the ovenbird family Furnariidae. It is found in Brazil and Paraguay.

== Taxonomy and systematics ==
The henna-capped foliage-gleaner has previously been placed in genera Automolus and Hypocryptus but genetic data place it firmly in Clibanornis. It and the canebrake groundcreeper (c. dendrocolaptoides) are sister species.

The henna-capped foliage-gleaner is monotypic.

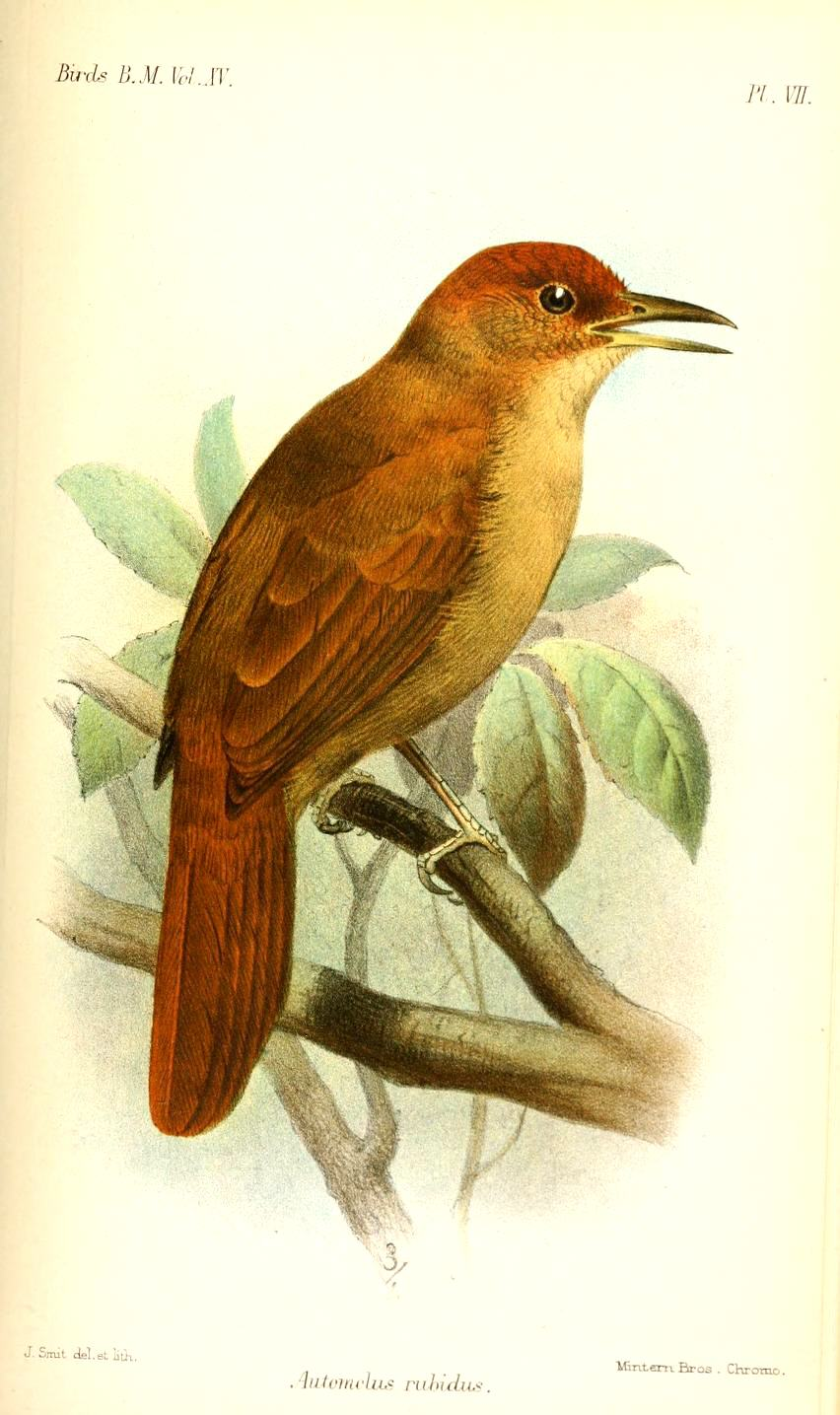
Clibanornis restirostris Illustration by Joseph Smit, 1890

== Description ==
The henna-capped foliage-gleaner is 20 to 21 cm (7.9 to 8.3 in) long and weighs 44 to 51 g (1.6 to 1.8 oz). It is a largish furnariid with a long almost straight bill. The sexes have the same plumage. Adults have a chestnut face with a light rufous moustacial area. Their crown is chestnut that becomes a slightly paler reddish chestnut collar and a rich ochraceous brown back and rump. Their uppertail coverts are chestnut. Their wings are mostly dark rufous and their tail chestnut. Their throat is pale rufous that becomes slightly darker on their breast and belly. Their flanks are darker rufescent brown and their undertail coverts reddish-rufous.Their iris is sulphur-yellow, their bill dark gray with a paler base to the mandible, and their legs and feet grayish.

== Distribution and habitat ==
The henna-capped foliage-gleaner is found in south-central Brazil between the states of Mato Grosso, Bahia, and Paraná and into eastern Paraguay's San Pedro Department. It inhabits gallery forest and also deciduous woodlands at elevations between 200 and 1,000 m (700 and 3,300 ft).

== Behavior ==
=== Movement ===
The henna-capped foliage-gleaner is a year-round resident throughout its range.

=== Feeding ===
The henna-capped foliage-gleaner feeds on arthropods. It forages mostly by itself or in pairs and is thought to occasionally join mixed-species feeding flocks. It is mostly terrestrial and gleans its prey from the ground and leaf litter.

=== Breeding ===
The henna-capped foliage-gleaner is assumed to be monogamous. It makes a nest of dry grass and leaves in a tunnel it excavates in an earthen bank. Nothing else is known about its breeding biology.

=== Vocalization ===
The henna-capped foliage-gleaner's call is a "dry, cackling 'kjep -kjep - -". Its song is like the call "but accelerating to a rattle, in total lasting 2-3 sec."

== Status ==
The IUCN originally in 1988 assessed the henna-capped foliage-gleaner as Near Threatened but since 2000 has rated it as being of Least Concern. It has a fairly large range but its population size is not known and is believed to be decreasing. "The species is presumably threatened by selective logging and agricultural conversion of forested areas within the Brazilian planalto, and more information is required regarding population size and trends." It is rather poorly known and considered rare to uncommon.
