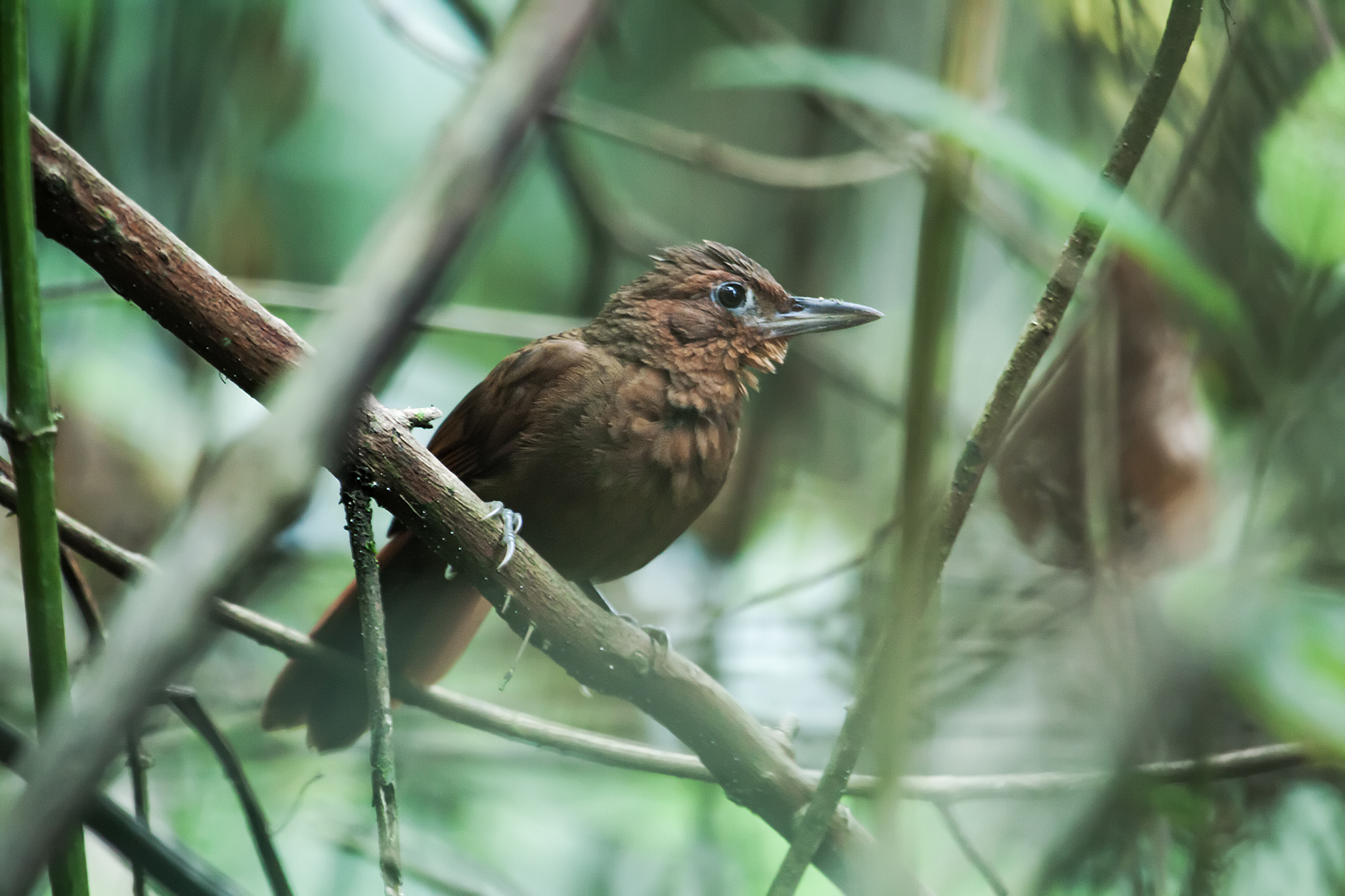

Conservation status
- Vulnerable (IUCN 3.1)

Scientific classification
- Kingdom: Animalia
- Phylum: Chordata
- Class: Aves
- Order: Passeriformes
- Family: Furnariidae
- Genus: Clibanornis
- Species: C. rufipectus

Binomial name
- Clibanornis rufipectus (Bangs, 1898)

Synonyms
- Hylocryptus rufipectus Automolus rufipectus

= Santa Marta foliage-gleaner =

Species of bird

The Santa Marta foliage-gleaner (Clibanornis rufipectus) is a vulnerable species of bird in the Furnariinae subfamily of the ovenbird family Furnariidae. It is endemic to Sierra Nevada de Santa Marta in Colombia.

== Taxonomy and systematics ==
What is now the Santa Marta foliage-gleaner was originally described as a species in genus Automolus but in the early twentieth century it was lumped into the ruddy foliage-gleaner (at the time A. rubiginosus, now C. rubiginosus). Following the data in a 2008 publication, it was restored to full species status. More recent genetic data place both firmly in Clibanornis. The Santa Marta, ruddy, and the Henna-hooded foliage-gleaner (C. erythrocephalus)) form a trio of sister species.

The Santa Marta foliage-gleaner is monotypic.

== Description ==
The Santa Marta foliage-gleaner is 17 to 20 cm (6.7 to 7.9 in) long. The sexes have the same plumage. Adults have a reddish brown face with slightly paler lores, faint brighter markings on the ear coverts, and a ring of bare blue skin around the eye. Their crown and back are medium brown. Their wing coverts and flight feathers are medium reddish brown with rufous edges. Their tail is dark chestnut. Their throat is pale rufous that blends to the reddish brown breast. Their lower breast and belly are light rufescent brown. Their iris is dark brown to grayish brown, their maxilla black to gray, their mandible pinkish gray to dusky horn, and their legs and feet brown to grayish olive.

== Distribution and habitat ==
The Santa Marta foliage-gleaner is found only in the isolated Sierra Nevada de Santa Marta in northern Colombia. It inhabits the undergrowth of semi-humid forest, both primary and secondary, and also occurs in shade coffee plantations. It appears to favor dark ravines. Its elevational range is about 600 to 1,900 m (2,000 to 6,200 ft).

== Behavior ==
=== Movement ===
The Santa Marta foliage-gleaner is assumed to be a year-round resident.

=== Feeding ===
The Santa Marta foliage-gleaner's diet has not been detailed but is assumed to be arthropods and also small vertebrates like that of the ruddy foliage-gleaner. It usually forages alone or in pairs and only rarely joins mixed-species feeding flocks. It typically forages in dense vegetation within 0.5 m (1.5 ft) of the ground where it takes its prey mostly from dead leaves.

=== Breeding ===
Aside from the discovery of an active nest in February, nothing is known about the Santa Marta foliage-gleaner's breeding biology. (No details of the nest were recorded.)

=== Vocalization ===
The Santa Marta foliage-gleaner's song is very different from those of its former fellow ruddy foliage-gleaner subspecies; the differences were part of the evidence for its being recognized as a species. A very detailed description is

resonant notes in series of 4–6 of up-downstrokes, the downstroke slightly more pronounced, and peak volume at highest pitch, with each song usually given in sets of two (less commonly one, even more rarely three) phrases, a brief pause of 0·3–0·5 seconds between the two phrases, and the first phrase frequently had an extra, often slightly weaker and lower-pitched introductory note; double phrases delivered fairly regularly with pauses between them 2–4 seconds long

Its calls are "churrs, both two- or three-noted while foraging but three- to four-noted in alarm" and are also quite different from those of ruddy foliage-gleaner.

== Status ==
The IUCN originally in 2011 assessed the Santa Marta foliage-gleaner as Near Threatened but in 2020 uplisted it to Vulnerable. It has a small range and its estimated population of 9300 to 13,100 mature individuals is believed to be decreasing. "Despite its tolerance of low levels of habitat conversion, the species is threatened by the loss and fragmentation of its habitat, and it was found to be absent in sun-grown coffee plantations and in small secondary-growth patches surrounded by open areas." and "Deforestation and forest degradation are accelerating and are projected to increase further, as coffee plantations and touristic infrastructure expand across the Sierra Nevada de Santa Marta." About 40% of its range is in protected areas.
