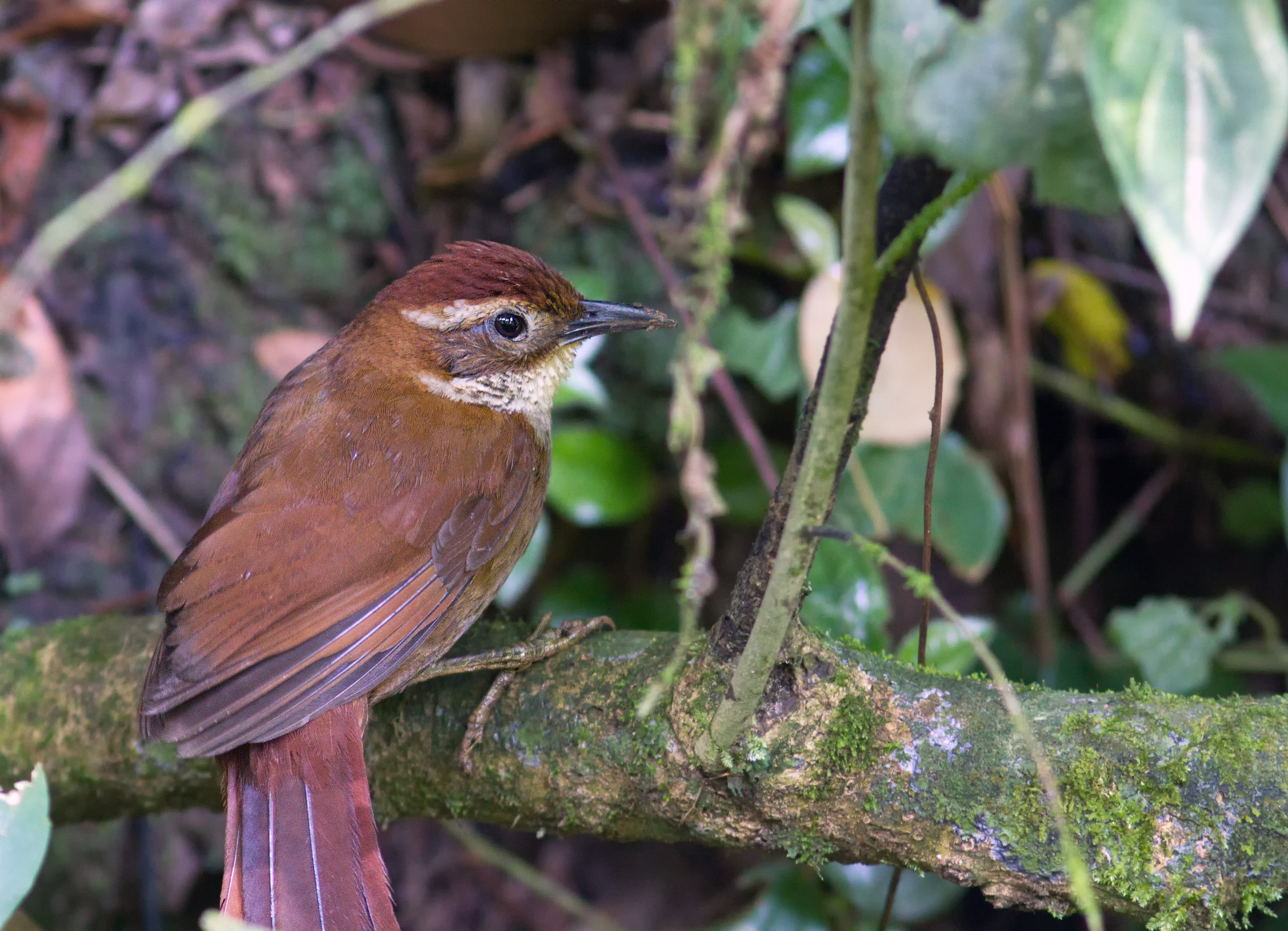
- Clibanornis dendrocolaptoides – Canebrake Groundcreeper; Curitiba, Paraná, Brazil

Scientific classification
- Kingdom: Animalia
- Phylum: Chordata
- Class: Aves
- Order: Passeriformes
- Family: Furnariidae
- Genus: Clibanornis; PL Sclater & Salvin, 1873

Type species
- Anabates dendrocolaptoides von Pelzeln, 1859

Species
- 5, see text

= Clibanornis =

Genus of birds

Clibanornis is a genus of birds in the family Furnariidae. Formerly, it contained only the Canebrake groundcreeper but phylogenetic studies revealed that this species is closely related to other four species formerly placed in Automolus (Ruddy foliage-gleaner and Santa Marta foliage-gleaner) and Hyloctistes (Henna-hooded foliage-gleaner and Henna-capped foliage-gleaner).

== Taxonomy ==
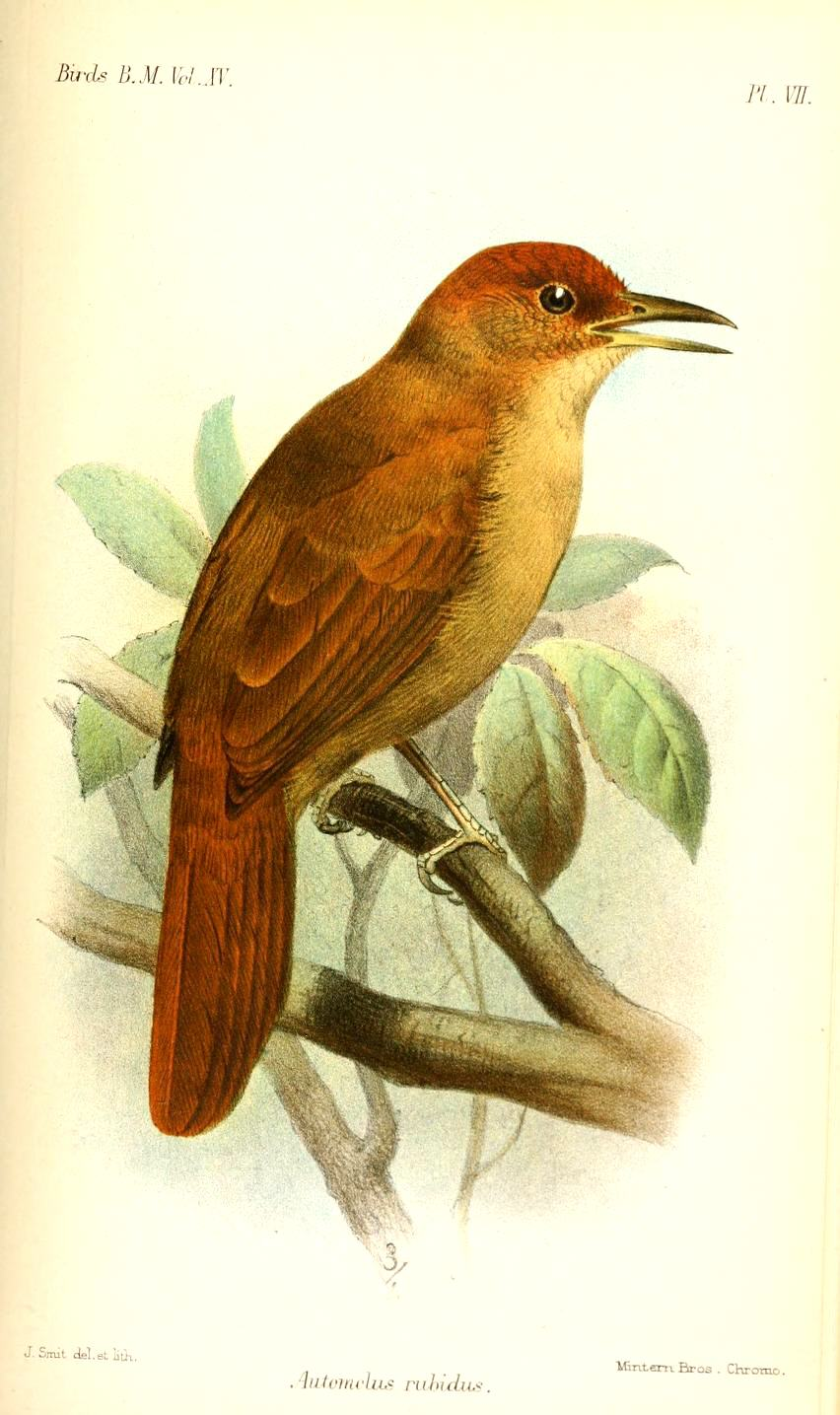
Henna-capped foliage-gleaner, formerly H. rectirostris, now C. rectirostris

Hylocryptus was a genus of birds in the family Furnariidae described by Frank Chapman in 1919. It used to include the Henna-capped foliage-gleaner, Hylocryptus rectirostris, and the Henna-hooded foliage-gleaner, Hylocryptus erythrocephalus. However, a new molecular phylogeny revealed that this genus was a polyphyletic group because H. rectirostris is more closely related to Canebrake groundcreeper, and H. erythrocephalus is more closely related to the Ruddy foliage-gleaner complex, a grouping also suggested by songs and morphology. All these species are now classified under the genus Clibanornis.

== Species ==
It contains the following species:

- Canebrake groundcreeper, Clibanornis dendrocolaptoides
- Ruddy foliage-gleaner, Clibanornis rubiginosus
- Santa Marta foliage-gleaner, Clibanornis rufipectus
- Henna-hooded foliage-gleaner, Clibanornis erythrocephalus
- Henna-capped foliage-gleaner, Clibanornis rectirostris
