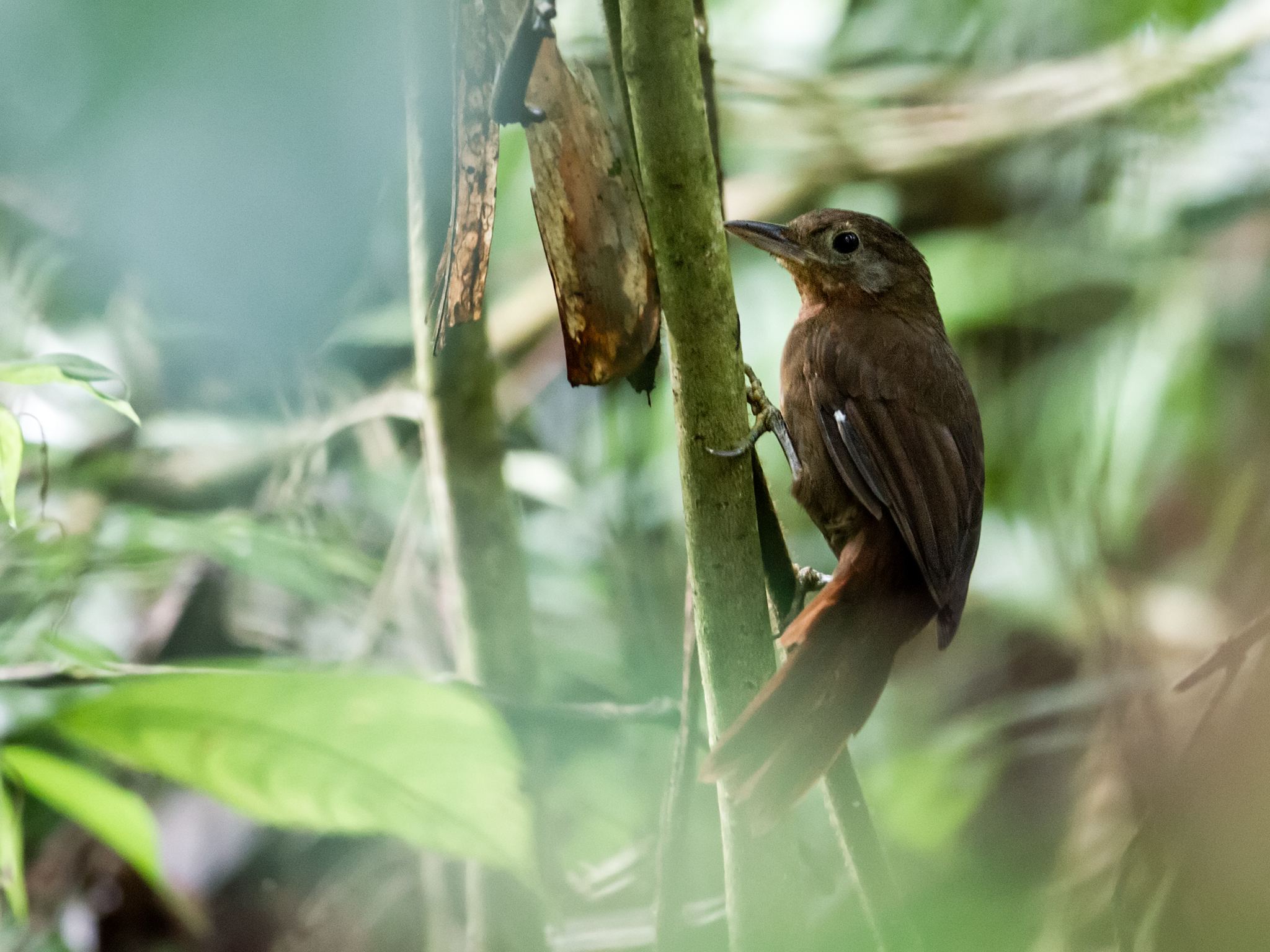

Conservation status
- Least Concern (IUCN 3.1)

Scientific classification
- Kingdom: Animalia
- Phylum: Chordata
- Class: Aves
- Order: Passeriformes
- Family: Furnariidae
- Genus: Clibanornis
- Species: C. rubiginosus

Binomial name
- Clibanornis rubiginosus (Sclater, PL, 1857)

Synonyms
- Automolus rubiginosus

= Ruddy foliage-gleaner =

Species of bird

The ruddy foliage-gleaner (Clibanornis rubiginosus) is a species of bird in the Furnariinae subfamily of the ovenbird family Furnariidae. Its range is highly disjunct, with populations in Mexico, several Central American countries, and in every mainland South American country except Argentina, Chile, Paraguay, and Uruguay.

== Taxonomy and systematics ==
The ruddy foliage-gleaner was previously placed in genus Automolus but genetic data place it firmly in Clibanornis. Beyond that change, the species' taxonomy is unsettled. The International Ornithological Committee (IOC) and BirdLife International's Handbook of the Birds of the World (HBW) assign it these 13 subspecies:

- C. r. guerrerensis (Salvin & Godman, 1891)
- C. r. rubiginosus (Sclater, PL, 1857)
- C. r. veraepacis (Salvin & Godman, 1891)
- C. r. fumosus (Salvin & Godman, 1891)
- C. r. saturatus (Chapman, 1915)
- C. r. sasaimae (Meyer de Schauensee, 1947)
- C. r. nigricauda (Hartert, EJO, 1898)
- C. r. venezuelanus (Zimmer, JT & Phelps, WH, 1947)
- C. r. cinnamomeigula (Hellmayr, 1905)
- C. r. caquetae (Meyer de Schauensee, 1947)
- C. r. brunnescens (Berlioz, 1927)
- C. r. watkinsi (spelled "watkinsorum" by HBW) (Hellmayr, 1912)
- C. r. obscurus (Pelzeln, 1859)

The Clements taxonomy adds two more subspecies, C. r. umbrinus (Salvin & Godman, 1891) and C. r. moderatus (Zimmer, 1935). The IOC and HBW include the first in veraepacis and the second in watkinsi.

There are distinct plumage and vocal variations among the subspecies of the ruddy foliage-gleaner, suggesting that more than one species is involved. Subspecies nigricauda and saturatus were together treated as a species early in the twentieth century, and obscurus has been proposed as a separate species. What is now the Santa Marta foliage-gleaner (C. rufipectus) was split from the ruddy foliage-gleaner following a 2008 publication.

This article follows the 13-subspecies model.

== Description ==
The ruddy foliage-gleaner is 17 to 21.5 cm (6.7 to 8.5 in) long, and most subspecies weigh between 39 and 52 g (1.4 and 1.8 oz). (Subspecies obscurus weighs 23 to 35 g (0.81 to 1.2 oz).) The sexes have the same plumage. Adults of the nominate subspecies C. r. rubiginosus have a dark reddish brown face with slightly paler lores, faint brighter markings on the ear coverts, and a ring of bare blue skin around the eye. Their crown is very dark brown with a reddish tone and slightly darker scallop markings. Their back is a slightly paler dark reddish brown than the crown, their rump a slightly paler dark brown than the back, and their uppertail coverts dark brown with reddish brown tips. Their wings and tail are also dark reddish brown. Their throat is dark rufous with rufescent brown feather tips and blends to the reddish brown breast that has faint paler spots along the feather shafts. Their belly is rufescent brown, their sides and flanks a darker brown, and their undertail coverts reddish brown. Their iris is dark brown to grayish brown, their maxilla black to gray, their mandible pinkish gray to dusky horn, and their legs and feet brown to grayish olive. Juveniles have a paler ochraceous throat and breast than adults.

The other subspecies of the ruddy foliage-gleaner differ from the nominate and each other thus:

- C. r. guerrerensis: much paler than nominate, with medium brown face and upperparts, paler but still dark rufous tail, underparts reddish only on upper breast
- C. r. veraepacis: slightly paler than nominate
- C. r. fumosus: darker crown and back and less tawny than nominate, wings also darker, throat paler and more ochraceous, breast and belly olive-brown with trace rufescent tinge
- C. r. saturatus: slightly darker but less reddish crown and back than nominate, rump and uppertail coverts same as back, much darker and less rufescent wings, tail almost black, paler throat, lower breast and belly olive-brown, flanks and undertail coverts dark brown; juvenile has much paler throat than nominate
- C. r. nigricauda: generally paler than nominate but almost black tail
- C. r. sasaimae: paler than nominate but olivaceous tinge to back; wing coverts and flight feather edges rufous (not brown); rufous tail, throat, and upper breast; much paler lower breast and belly
- C. r. cinnamomeigula: dark olive ear coverts, cinnamon-rufous underparts with buff-rufous center of belly
- C. r. watkinsi: dark reddish chestnut crown, ochraceous chin and upper throat, medium olive-brown belly, no rufescent tinge on flanks
- C. r. brunnescens: dark rufescent-brown upperparts, dark rufous throat and upper breast, rest of underparts rufescent-brown
- C. r. caquetae: compared to brunnescens, paler upperparts, paler chestnut throat and breast, much less rufescent belly and flanks
- C. r. obscurus: smallest of all subspecies, darkest and reddest of the South American ones, rufescent olive-brown belly
- C. r. venezuelanus: compared to obscurus, less rufescent more olivaceous crown, back, and wings; paler belly

== Distribution and habitat ==
The ruddy foliage-gleaner has a highly disjunct distribution. Its subspecies are found thus:

- C. r. guerrerensis: Guerrero and Oaxaca in southwestern Mexico
- C. r. rubiginosus: eastern Mexico from San Luis Potosí south to Oaxaca
- C. r. veraepacis: from Chiapas in southern Mexico south through Guatemala and Honduras into northern Nicaragua
- C. r. fumosus: extreme southwestern Costa Rica to Panama's Chiriquí Province
- C. r. saturatus: in Panama from Panamá Province through Darién Province into northwestern Colombia's Antioquia Department
- C. r. sasaimae: west slope of Colombia's Eastern Andes
- C. r. nigricauda: from western Colombia's Serranía del Baudó south through western Ecuador into northernmost Peru's Department of Tumbes
- C. r. venezuelanus: the tepui region where southern Venezuela and northwestern Brazil meet
- C. r. cinnamomeigula: southwestern Venezuela's Apure state and the eastern foothills of Colombia's Eastern Andes in Meta Department
- C. r. caquetae: from foothills of Colombia's Eastern Andes in Caquetá Department south into Ecuador's Sucumbíos Province
- C. r. brunnescens: eastern Andean foothills from Napo Province in Ecuador south into Peru's Amazonas Department
- C. r. watkinsi: from the Department of Loreto in northern Peru south into western Bolivia's La Paz Department
- C. r. obscurus: the Guianas and northeastern Brazil north of the Amazon River

The ruddy foliage-gleaner's habitat varies geographically. In Mexico and Central America it inhabits humid evergreen, pine-evergreen, and pine-oak forests, cloudforest, and coffee plantations, mainly between 500 and 2,500 m (1,600 and 8,200 ft) of elevation. In the Andes it inhabits lowland, foothill, and lower montane evergreen forest up to about 1,500 m (4,900 ft). In the Guianas and northern Brazil it inhabits lowland tropical forest from near sea level to about 1,300 m (4,300 ft). It tends to stay in the forest understory and seems to have affinity for the bottoms of ravines with dense vegetation.

== Behavior ==
=== Movement ===
The ruddy foliage-gleaner is a year-round resident in most of its range though some populations in Mexico might make elevational changes with the seasons.

=== Feeding ===
The ruddy foliage-gleaner feeds on a variety of arthropods and also small vertebrates like frogs. It usually forages in pairs and rarely joins mixed-species feeding flocks. It mostly forages in the undergrowth though sometimes as high as the forest's mid-storey. It usually gleans its prey from dead leaves, pecks it from decaying branches, and sometimes flips around leaf litter on the ground.

=== Breeding ===
The ruddy foliage-gleaner's breeding season or seasons have not been fully defined but are known to vary geographically. The species is monogamous and pairs remain together year-round. The known nests were cups of soft fibers in a chamber at the end of a tunnel in an earthen bank. The clutch size is normally two eggs and the female incubates at night. Nothing else is known about the species' breeding biology.

=== Vocalization ===
The ruddy foliage-gleaner's vocalizations vary among the subspecies. In Mexico what is thought to be its song is "a disyllabic, nasal mewing yeh'nk yeh'nk' or yeh-enk' yeh-enk' ". There its calls are "a hard dry chatter and a slowly repeated chak". In northern Central America its call is "a burry, scratchy Churee!-Churee!-Churee!". It has a variety of calls in Costa Rica and Panama, rendered as "ka-kweek", "ta-whoip", "a-whick", "eeaah", and "kaayr, kaayr". In Colombia its call is a repeated "antbird-like sneering croak". In the Andes of Ecuador it makes as persistent call, a "querulous and nasal, upslurred 'kweeeeahhhh' ". In the Guianas and northern Brazil its call is "a sharp, emphatic 'chuck-kwihhh' " whose second note rises; it is also described as a "2-noted 'tutwuuh' (2nd note higher)".

== Status ==
The IUCN has assessed the ruddy foliage-gleaner as being of Least Concern. It has an extremely large range and an estimated population of at least 500,000 mature individuals, though the latter is believed to be decreasing. No immediate threats have been identified. It is patchily distributed and considered rare to locally fairly common. It occurs in protected areas in several countries.
