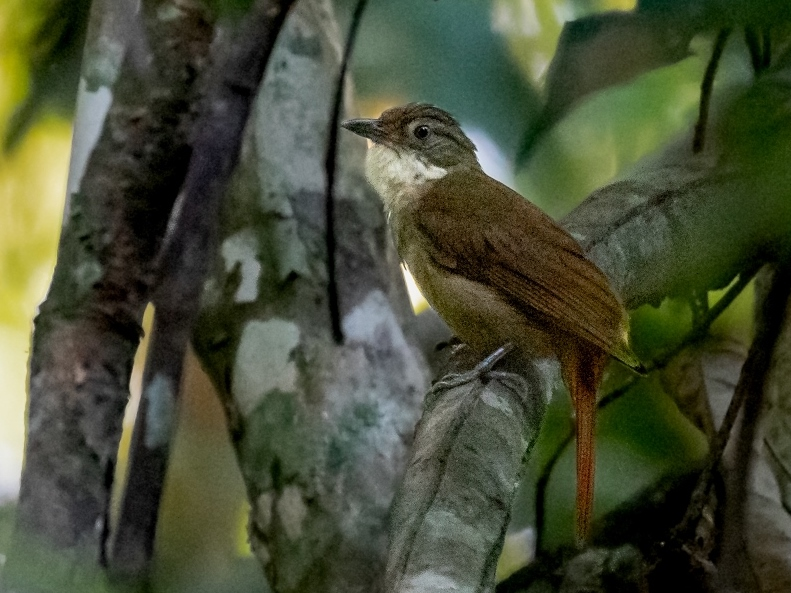

Conservation status
- Least Concern (IUCN 3.1)

Scientific classification
- Kingdom: Animalia
- Phylum: Chordata
- Class: Aves
- Order: Passeriformes
- Family: Furnariidae
- Genus: Automolus
- Species: A. paraensis

Binomial name
- Automolus paraensis Hartert, 1902

Synonyms
- Automolus infuscatus paraensis

= Para foliage-gleaner =

Species of bird

The Para foliage-gleaner (Automolus paraensis) is a species of bird in the Furnariinae subfamily of the ovenbird family Furnariidae. It is endemic to Brazil.

== Taxonomy and systematics ==
The Para foliage-gleaner was previously treated as a subspecies of the olive-backed foliage-gleaner (A. infuscatus). A 2002 publication detailed significant vocal differences between them; based on that evidence major taxonomic systems elevated it to species rank. The Para foliage-gleaner, olive-backed foliage-gleaner, Pernambuco foliage-gleaner (A. lammi), and white-eyed foliage-gleaner (A. leucophthalmus) form a superspecies.

The Para foliage-gleaner is monotypic.

== Description ==
The Para foliage-gleaner is 18 to 19 cm (7.1 to 7.5 in) long and weighs 32 to 41 g (1.1 to 1.4 oz). It is a fairly large member of its genus and has a heavy bill. The sexes have the same plumage, and differ very little from the formerly conspecific olive-backed foliage-gleaner. Adults have a mostly blackish brown face with reddish streaks on the ear coverts and grizzled blackish brown and buff lores. Their forehead is blackish brown with wide but inconspicuous rufescent brown streaks that become faint scallops on the grayish brown crown. They have a vague dark brown collar with faint light brown streaks. Their back and rump are rich dark olivaceous-brown that blends to dark reddish brown uppertail coverts. Their wing coverts are rich dark brown and their flight feathers slightly paler with a rufescent tinge. Their tail is dark rufous. Their throat and the sides of their neck are white, their center breast white with a gray wash that becomes buffy before their light buff-brownish belly. The sides of their breast are dark olive-brown, their flanks rufescent brown, and their undertail coverts pale brown. Their iris is dark brown, light brown, or hazel; their maxilla black to dark olive-horn; their mandible olive horn to gray to pale brown; and their legs and feet grayish green to yellowish olive. Juveniles are slightly darker and duller than adults.

== Distribution and habitat ==
The Para foliage-gleaner is found only in Brazil south of the Amazon, from the right bank of the Rio Madeira east to the Atlantic in Maranhão state and south to Rondônia and Mato Grosso states. It inhabits tropical evergreen forest, primarily terra firme but also várzea and secondary forest. In elevation it ranges from near sea level to 700 m (2,300 ft).

== Behavior ==
=== Movement ===
The Para foliage-gleaner is a year-round resident throughout its range.

=== Feeding ===
The Para foliage-gleaner feeds on a variety of larval and adult insects and spiders, and also eats small lizards. It forages singly or in pairs, and most of the time as part of a mixed-species feeding flock. It feeds mostly in the forest undergrowth though it occasionally will do so to the mid-storey but only rarely to the subcanopy. It acrobatically gleans and pulls prey from epiphytes, debris, bark crevices, and especially from clumps of dead leaves.

=== Breeding ===
The Para foliage-gleaner's breeding season has not been defined but includes at least January and February. It builds a cup nest of plant fibers in a chamber at the end of a tunnel it excavates in an earthen bank. The clutch size is two eggs. Nothing else is known about its breeding biology.

=== Vocalization ===
The Para foliage-gleaner's song is a "very high, penetrating, sharp 'kreet-kreetkrititit', slightly descending". Its call is a nasal "wheet wheet".

== Status ==
The IUCN has assessed the Para foliage-gleaner as being of Least Concern. It has a large range, but its population size is not known and is believed to be decreasing. No immediate threats have been identified. It is considered common to fairly common in most of its range and occurs in many protected areas. It appears able to persist in fairly small forest fragments.
