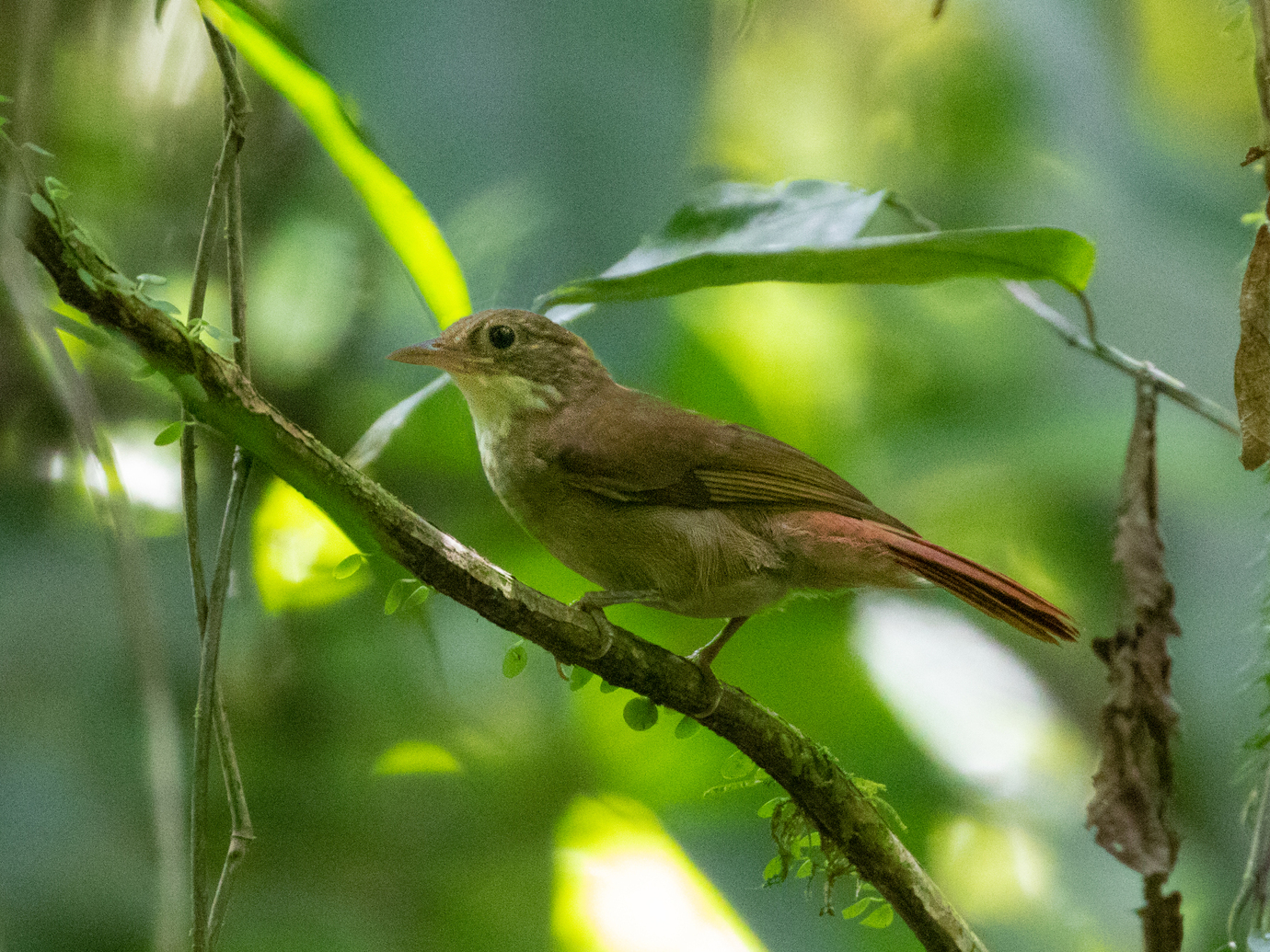

Conservation status
- Least Concern (IUCN 3.1)

Scientific classification
- Kingdom: Animalia
- Phylum: Chordata
- Class: Aves
- Order: Passeriformes
- Family: Furnariidae
- Genus: Automolus
- Species: A. infuscatus

Binomial name
- Automolus infuscatus (Sclater, PL, 1856)

Audio
- Automolus infuscatus infuscatus song, Ecuador

= Olive-backed foliage-gleaner =

Species of bird

The olive-backed foliage-gleaner (Automolus infuscatus) is a species of bird in the Furnariinae subfamily of the ovenbird family Furnariidae. It is found in every mainland South American country except Argentina, Chile, Paraguay, and Uruguay.

== Taxonomy and systematics ==
The olive-backed foliage-gleaner has these four subspecies:

- Automolus infuscatus infuscatus (Sclater, PL, 1856)
- Automolus infuscatus badius Zimmer, JT, 1935
- Automolus infuscatus cervicalis (Sclater, PL, 1889)
- Automolus infuscatus purusianus Todd, 1948

What is now the Para foliage-gleaner (A. paraensis) was a fifth subspecies. Following a 2002 publication, major taxonomic systems elevated it to species rank.

The olive-backed foliage-gleaner, Para foliage-gleaner, Pernambuco foliage-gleaner (A. lammi), and white-eyed foliage-gleaner (A. leucophthalmus) form a superspecies.

== Description ==
The olive-backed foliage-gleaner is 18 to 19 cm (7.1 to 7.5 in) long and weighs about 27 to 40 g (0.95 to 1.4 oz). It is a fairly large member of its genus and has a heavy bill. The sexes have the same plumage. Adults of the nominate subspecies A. i. infuscatus have a mostly blackish brown face with faint reddish streaks on the ear coverts and grizzled blackish brown and buff lores. Their forehead is blackish brown with wide but inconspicuous rufescent brown streaks that become faint on the dark brown crown. They have a vague dark brown collar with faint light brown streaks. Their back and rump are rich dark olivaceous-brown that blends to dark reddish brown uppertail coverts. Their wing coverts are rich dark brown and their flight feathers slightly paler with a rufescent tinge. Their tail is dark reddish chestnut. Their throat and the sides of their neck are white, their center breast white with a gray wash that becomes buffy before their light buff-brownish belly. The sides of their breast are dark olive-brown, their flanks rufescent brown, and their undertail coverts pale brown. Their iris is dark brown, light brown, or hazel; their maxilla black to dark olive-horn; their mandible olive horn to gray to pale brown; and their legs and feet grayish green to yellowish olive. Juveniles are slightly darker and duller than adults.

Subspecies A. i. purusianus has more rufescent (less olivaceous) upperparts than the nominate. A. i. cervicalis has a more rufescent crown and hindneck than the nominate, with slightly more brownish flanks. A. i. badius has the reddest brown back and grayest lower breast and belly of all the subspecies.

== Distribution and habitat ==
The olive-backed foliage-gleaner is a bird of the Amazon Basin. Its subspecies are found thus:

- Automolus infuscatus infuscatus: southeastern Colombia from Meta and Guainía departments south through eastern Ecuador and eastern Peru into northern Bolivia just into La Paz Department
- Automolus infuscatus badius: eastern Colombia's Vichada Department, southern Venezuela, and northwestern Brazil north of the Amazon to the Rio Negro
- Automolus infuscatus cervicalis: from Bolívar state in Venezuela east through the Guianas and northern Brazil north of the Amazon between the Rio Negro and Amapá state
- Automolus infuscatus purusianus: western Brazil south of the Amazon east to the Rio Madeira

The olive-backed foliage-gleaner inhabits tropical evergreen forest, primarily terra firme but also várzea and secondary forest. In elevation it ranges from near sea level to 700 m (2,300 ft).

== Behavior ==
=== Movement ===
The olive-backed foliage-gleaner is a year-round resident throughout its range.

=== Feeding ===
The olive-backed foliage-gleaner feeds on a variety of larval and adult insects and spiders, and also eats small lizards. It forages singly or in pairs, and most of the time as part of a mixed-species feeding flock. It feeds mostly in the forest undergrowth though it occasionally will do so to the mid-storey but only rarely to the canopy. It acrobatically gleans and pulls prey from epiphytes, debris, bark crevices, and especially from clumps of dead leaves.

=== Breeding ===
The olive-backed foliage-gleaner's breeding season or seasons have not been defined but birds in breeding condition have been observed somewhere in almost every month of the year. It is thought to be monogamous. It builds a nest in a chamber at the end of a tunnel it excavates in an earthen bank. The clutch size is two eggs. Nothing else is known about its breeding biology.

=== Vocalization ===
The olive-backed foliage-gleaner's song is "a loud, fast, staccato, slightly descending rattle, 'tchi-r-r-r-r-r-r-r-r-r-r-r-r-r-r-r' ". Its calls include "a sharp 'chik-uh' or 'chík-wuk' " and "chik-qwaah".

== Status ==
The IUCN has assessed the olive-backed foliage-gleaner as being of Least Concern. It has an extremely large range, but its population size is not known and is believed to be decreasing. No immediate threats have been identified. It is considered common to fairly common in most of its range and occurs in many protected areas.
