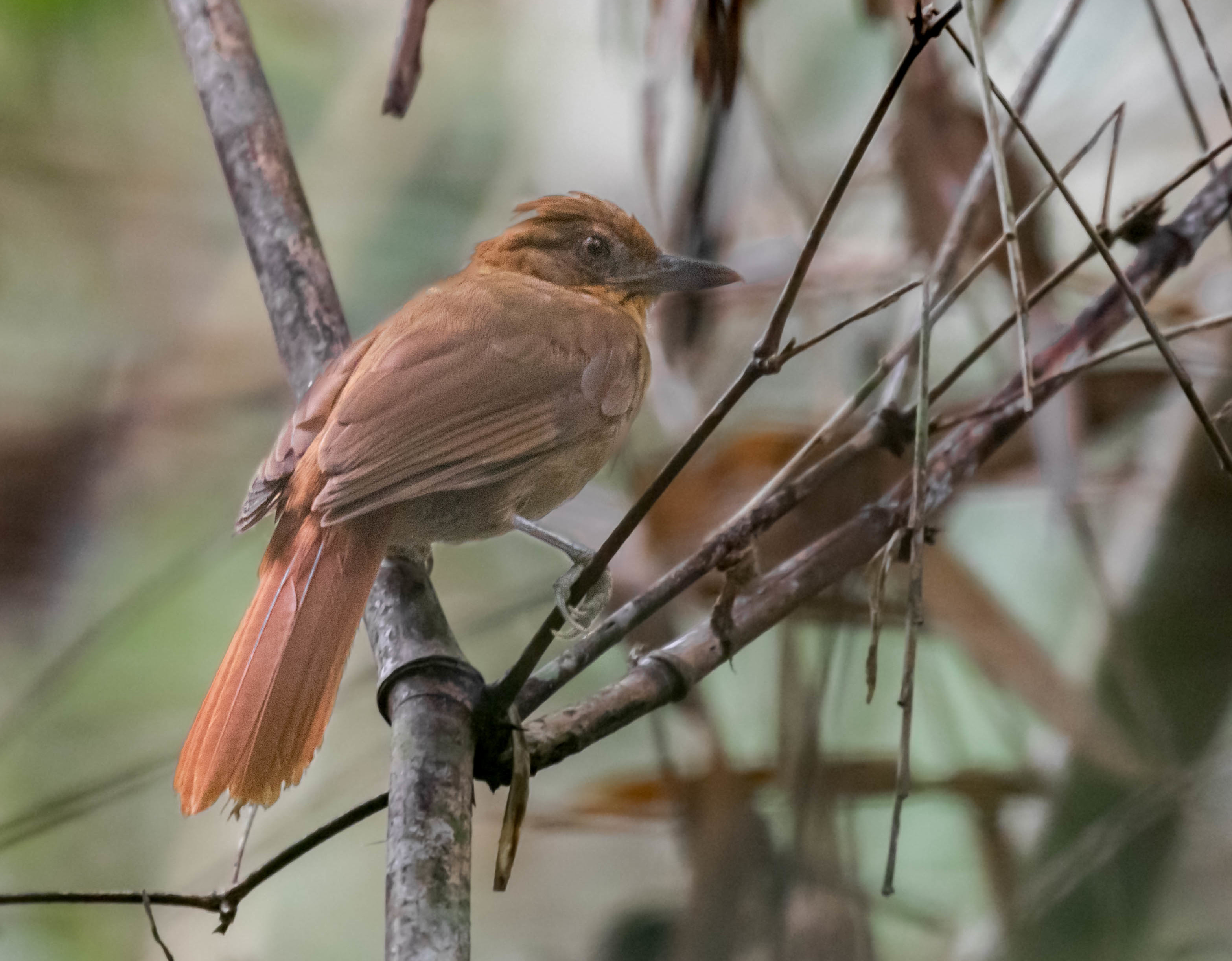

Conservation status
- Least Concern (IUCN 3.1)

Scientific classification
- Kingdom: Animalia
- Phylum: Chordata
- Class: Aves
- Order: Passeriformes
- Family: Furnariidae
- Genus: Automolus
- Species: A. melanopezus

Binomial name
- Automolus melanopezus (Sclater, PL, 1858)

= Brown-rumped foliage-gleaner =

Species of bird

The brown-rumped foliage-gleaner (Automolus melanopezus) is a species of bird in the Furnariinae subfamily of the ovenbird family Furnariidae. It is found in Bolivia, Brazil, Colombia, Ecuador, and Peru.

== Taxonomy and systematics ==
The brown-rumped foliage-gleaner and the chestnut-crowned foliage-gleaner (A. rufipileatus) are sister species. The brown-rumped is monotypic.

== Description ==
The brown-rumped foliage-gleaner is 16 to 19 cm (6.3 to 7.5 in) long and weighs 27 to 32 g (0.95 to 1.1 oz). It is one of the smaller members of its genus and has a shortish and heavy bill. The sexes have the same plumage. Adults have a mostly rich dark brown face with a few buff streaks on the ear coverts, grizzled brownish and grayish lores, and an ochraceous malar area. Their crown is rich brown with some faint pale spots on the forehead. Their back and rump are rich brown that blends to chestnut-tinged brown uppertail coverts. Their wing has dull ochraceous at the bend, dark reddish brown coverts, and somewhat more rufescent flight feathers. Their tail is dull reddish brown. Their throat is dull tawny-buff that becomes light brown on the breast and belly. Their sides and flanks are darker brown and their undertail coverts pale rufescent brown. Their iris is dark red to orange, their maxilla dark grayish to blackish, their mandible pale gray to grayish brown, and their legs and feet olive-gray to greenish gray. Juveniles have thin dark edges on their crown feathers and a paler throat and darker and browner underparts than adults.

== Distribution and habitat ==
The brown-rumped foliage-gleaner has a disjunct distribution in the western Amazon Basin. One population is found around where southwestern Colombia, eastern Ecuador, and northern Peru meet. The other is found in a band in southeastern Peru, northern Bolivia, and west-central Brazil. Despite this separation, the populations are essentially phenotypically identical. The species inhabits tropical evergreen forest, usually on floodplains (both várzea and terra firme), and almost always in or near thickets of Guadua bamboo. In elevation it mostly ranges between 300 and 500 m (1,000 and 1,600 ft) and locally occurs up to 600 m (2,000 ft).

== Behavior ==
=== Movement ===
The brown-rumped foliage-gleaner is a year-round resident throughout its range.

=== Feeding ===
The brown-rumped foliage-gleaner feeds mostly on a variety of insects and spiders; small tree frogs have also been recorded in its diet. It regularly joins mixed-species feeding flocks. It forages from the forest's undergrowth to its lower mid-storey, acrobatically gleaning and pulling prey from debris and clumps of dead leaves.

=== Breeding ===
Nothing is known about the brown-rumped foliage-gleaner's breeding biology.

=== Vocalization ===
The brown-rumped foliage-gleaner's song is "a fast, rhythmic 'whip, whip, whudidididit-wrrrrrr', or staccato burst of upward-inflected notes, 'whe-de-de-de-de-de-de', slightly descending at [the] end".

== Status ==
The IUCN has assessed the brown-rumped foliage-gleaner as being of Least Concern. It has a fairly large range, but its population size is not known and is believed to be decreasing. No immediate threats have been identified. It is considered rare to uncommon through its range. It occurs in at least one protected area, Manú National Park.
