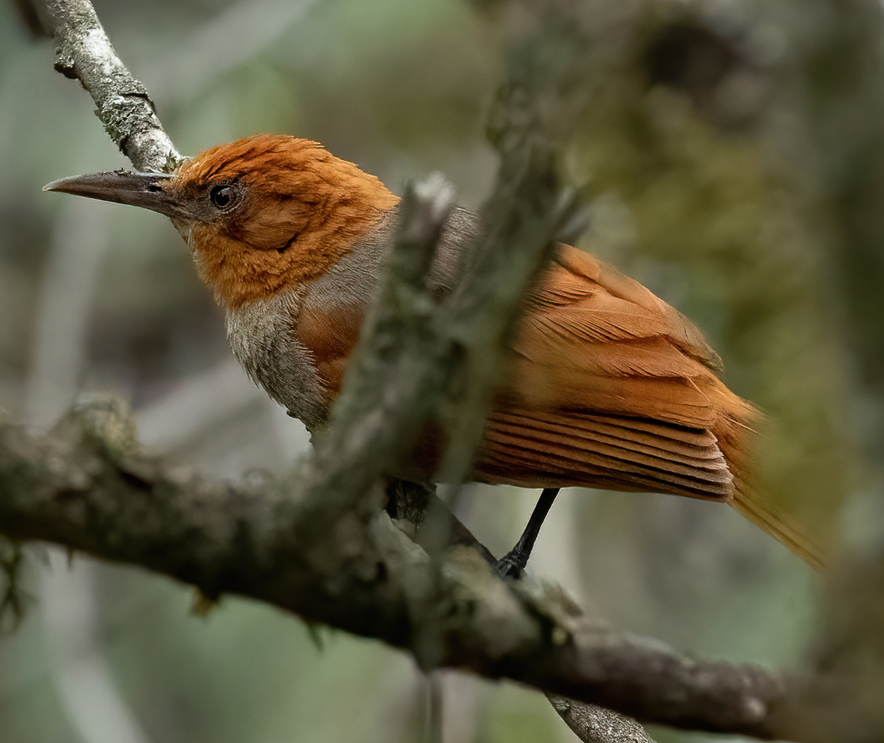

Conservation status
- Near Threatened (IUCN 3.1)

Scientific classification
- Kingdom: Animalia
- Phylum: Chordata
- Class: Aves
- Order: Passeriformes
- Family: Furnariidae
- Genus: Clibanornis
- Species: C. erythrocephalus

Binomial name
- Clibanornis erythrocephalus (Chapman, 1919)

Synonyms
- Hylocryptus erythrocephalus

= Henna-hooded foliage-gleaner =

Species of bird

The henna-hooded foliage-gleaner (Clibanornis erythrocephalus) is a Near Threatened species of bird in the Furnariinae subfamily of the ovenbird family Furnariidae. It is found in Ecuador and Peru.

== Taxonomy and systematics ==
The henna-hooded foliage-gleaner has previously been placed in genera Automolus and Hypocryptus but genetic data place it firmly in Clibanornis. It has two subspecies, the nominate C. e. erythrocephalus (Chapman, 1919) and C. e. palamblae (Zimmer, JT, 1935).

== Description ==
The henna-hooded foliage-gleaner is about 21 cm (8.3 in) long and weighs about 48 g (1.7 oz). It is a large, boldly-patterned foliage-gleaner with a thick, slightly decurved, bill. The sexes have the same plumage. Adults of the nominate subspecies have a unique henna (orange-rufous) head, neck, wings, and tail. Their back is brownish olive. Their underparts are mostly pale brownish gray with a rufous crissum. Their iris is variable from yellow to gray-brown, their maxilla gray or blackish gray, their mandible whitish or horn with a dusky end, and their legs and feet olive or gray. Subspecies C. e. palamblae is a paler rufous where the nominate is henna, and has a grayer (less brownish) back and a paler buff breast and belly.

== Distribution and habitat ==
The nominate subspecies of the henna-hooded foliage-gleaner has a disjunct distribution. One population is found in west-central Ecuador's Manabí and Guayas provinces. The other is from far southern Guayas and Auzuay provinces south through El Oro and Loja into Peru's extreme northwestern Department of Tumbes. Subspecies C. e. palamblae is found further south, in the Peruvian departments of Piura and Lambayeque. The species inhabits deciduous and semihumid forests and woodlands, mostly on the lower slopes of the west side of the Andes. It favors areas with many species of Malvaceae, the mallow family. In Ecuador it mainly occurs between elevations of 400 and 1,800 m (1,300 and 5,900 ft) and in Peru between 400 and 1,500 m (1,300 and 4,900 ft).

== Behavior ==
=== Movement ===
The henna-hooded foliage-gleaner is a year-round resident throughout its range.

=== Feeding ===
The henna-hooded foliage-gleaner's diet has not been studied but appears to be terrestrial invertebrates; isopods are a known component. It forages singly and in pairs and often joins mixed-species feeding flocks. It hunts its prey on and near the ground, noisily flicking aside leaves and probing among leaf litter, clusters of dead leaves, and vine tangles.

=== Breeding ===
The henna-hooded foliage-gleaner's breeding season is from January to May. Both adults excavate a burrow in a shaded earthen bank and build a nest of rootlets and other fibers in a chamber at its end. All known clutches have been of three eggs. The incubation period is 16 to 19 days; the time to fledging and details of parental care are not known.

=== Vocalization ===
The henna-hooded foliage-gleaner's song is far-carrying, "a persistent, staccato churring, 'kree-kruh-kruh-kruh-kruh-kruh-kruh-kurr' with [an] odd, mechanical-sounding quality". It also has a distinctive call, "a short, sharp, high note".

== Status ==
The IUCN originally in 1988 assessed the henna-hooded foliage-gleaner as Threatened, then in 1994 as Vulnerable, and since 2020 as Near Threatened. It has a somewhat limited range and an estimated population between 2500 and 10,000 mature individuals that is believed to be decreasing. "The most severe threat to the species is the loss and degradation of its habitat...[e]ven protected areas are affected by illegal settlement and deforestation, livestock-grazing and habitat clearance by people seeking land rights". "The species appears sensitive to disturbance, and there is anecdotal evidence that these disturbances may cause nests to fail, even in protected areas."
