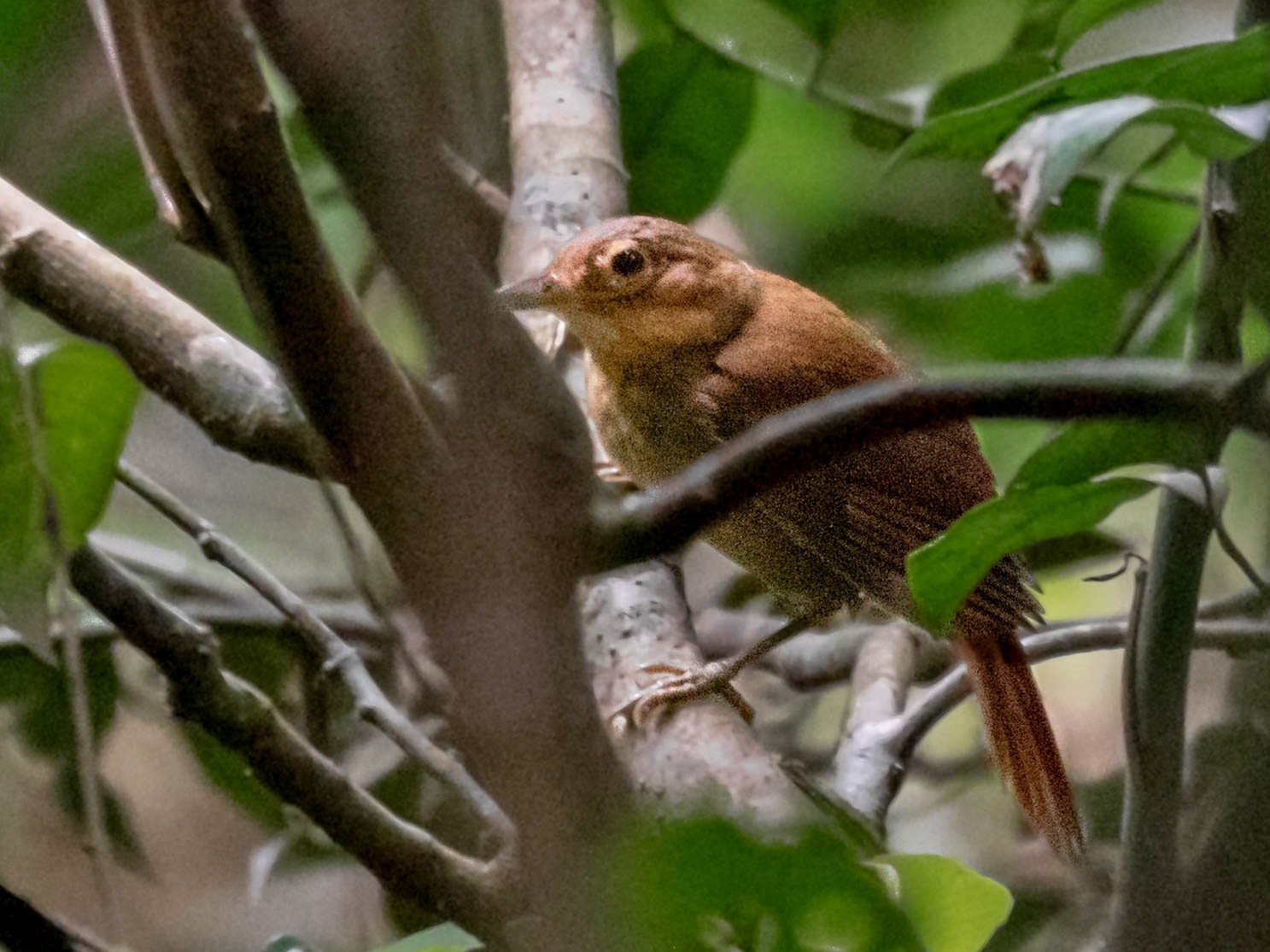
- Photographed in Rio Branco, Acre, Brazil

Conservation status
- Least Concern (IUCN 3.1)(but see Taxonomy and Status sections)

Scientific classification
- Kingdom: Animalia
- Phylum: Chordata
- Class: Aves
- Order: Passeriformes
- Family: Furnariidae
- Genus: Automolus
- Species: A. ochrolaemus

Binomial name
- Automolus ochrolaemus (Tschudi, 1844)

Synonyms
- Anabates ochrolaemus Tschudi, 1844

= Ochre-throated foliage-gleaner =

Species of bird

The ochre-throated foliage-gleaner (Automolus ochrolaemus) is a species of bird in the Furnariinae subfamily of the ovenbird family Furnariidae. It is found in Panama and every mainland South American country except Argentina, Chile, Paraguay, and Uruguay.

== Taxonomy and systematics ==
The ochre-throated foliage-gleaner's taxonomy is unsettled. Until July 2023 the International Ornithological Committee (IOC) called A. ochrolaemus the buff-throated foliage gleaner and assigned it these six subspecies:

- A. o. cervinigularis (Sclater, PL, 1857)
- A. o. hypophaeus Ridgway, 1909
- A. o. pallidigularis Lawrence, 1862
- A. o. turdinus (von Pelzeln, 1859)
- A. o. ochrolaemus (Tschudi, 1844)
- A. o. auricularis Zimmer, JT, 1935

The Clements taxonomy added a seventh, A. o. amusos (Peters, 1929). BirdLife International's Handbook of the Birds of the World does not recognize A. o. amusos but includes A. o. exsertus as the seventh subspecies. The IOC, Clements, and the American Ornithological Society previously recognized exsertus as a separate species, the Chiriqui foliage-gleaner.

In July 2023 the IOC split A. o. cervinigularis and A. o. hypophaeus from the buff-throated to form the new species fawn-throated foliage-gleaner, which by the principle of priority took the binomial A. cervinigularis. The IOC renamed the remaining four subspecies the ochre-throated foliage-gleaner to avoid confusion with the former, larger, buff-throated species. It retains the former binomial A. ochrolaemus. In October 2023 the Clements taxonomy accepted the same split and deleted A. o. amusos entirely. The other systems retain their own versions of the previous seven-subspecies buff-throated foliage-gleaner

This article follows the four-subspecies model.

== Description ==
The ochre-throated foliage-gleaner is 18 to 20 cm (7.1 to 7.9 in) long and weighs 30 to 46 g (1.1 to 1.6 oz). It is a fairly large member of its genus and has a shortish and heavy bill. The sexes have the same plumage. Adults of the nominate subspecies A. o. ochrolaemus have a mostly dark brownish face with a bold buff eyering and stripe behind the eye, faint reddish streaks on the ear coverts, and an ochraceous-buff malar area with faint dark flecks. Their crown and nape are dark brown with a faint blackish brown scallop pattern. Their back and rump are rich dark brown that blends to dark chestnut uppertail coverts. Their wing coverts are rich dark brown and their flight feathers slightly paler and more rufescent. Their tail is dark chestnut. Their throat is deep buff, their breast is streaked with medium brown and ochraceous buff, and their belly is brown. Their flanks are a darker and more rufescent brown and their undertail coverts dull chestnut. Their iris is brown to dark brown, their maxilla blackish horn, gray, or horn brown, their mandible greenish buff to gray, and their legs and feet olive, greenish brown, or greenish gray. Juveniles are slightly duller than adults, with a less obvious eyering, a rufous tinge to the face, a chestnut tinge to the crown, and slightly mottled throat and breast.

The ochre-throated foliage-gleaner subspecies A. o. pallidigularis is the palest and dullest, with a nearly white throat and dull brown underparts that have no ochraceous tinge. A. o. auricularis is larger and duller than the nominate. Its back is more grayish olive and its underparts paler with less streaking. A. o. turdinus has a paler throat and slightly less ochraceous underparts than the nominate. Its underparts are intermediate in tone and markings between the nominate and auricularis.

== Distribution and habitat ==
The subspecies of the ochre-throated foliage-gleaner are found thus:

- A. o. pallidigularis: Tumbes–Chocó–Magdalena
- A. o. turdinus: from southeastern Colombia east through southern Venezuela and the Guianas to the Atlantic and south through eastern Ecuador into northeastern Peru and northwestern Brazil north of the Amazon
- A. o. ochrolaemus: south of the Amazon in eastern Peru, western Brazil, and central Bolivia
- A. o. auricularis: central Brazil south of the Amazon between the Rio Purus and Pará state and south into northeastern Bolivia

The ochre-throated foliage-gleaner inhabits a variety of forested landscapes across its very large range. In Panama it occurs in lowland rainforest and secondary forest up to an elevation of about 1,500 m (4,900 ft). In most of the Amazon Basin it occurs in transitional forest, seasonally flooded várzea forest, and swamp forest between sea level and about 1,000 m (3,300 ft). West of the Andes in Colombia and Ecuador it typically occurs in secondary forest up to about 800 m (2,600 ft). Locally along the Andes it reaches 1,400 m (4,600 ft).

== Behavior ==
=== Movement ===
The ochre-throated foliage-gleaner is a year-round resident throughout its range.

=== Feeding ===
The ochre-throated foliage-gleaner feeds mostly on a variety of insects, spiders, and vertebrates like small frogs. It forages singly or in pairs and often (perhaps usually) joins mixed-species feeding flocks. It forages from the forest's undergrowth to its mid-storey, acrobatically gleaning and pulling prey from epiphytes, debris, and especially from clumps of dead leaves as it hops along branches and vines. In Central America it has also been observed foraging on the ground by flipping aside leaf litter.

=== Breeding ===
The only information on the ochre-throated foliage-gleaner's breeding biology comes from a 1929 description of a nest in Panama. It was a shallow but bulky cup of leaf stems in a chamber at the end of a tunnel excavated in an earthen stream bank.

=== Vocalization ===
The ochre-throated foliage-gleaner's song appears similar among its subspecies. It sings mostly at dawn and dusk. In Brazil it is a "series of 3-4 well-separated, descending 'keh-keh-keh-kreh' notes". In Ecuador it is "a short descending series of well-enunciated notes, e.g. 'kee-kee-ke-krr' or 'ki, ki, ki-ki-ke-ke-krr' ". Other descriptions from South America include "kee-kee-krr-krr", "jee, jee, ju-ju-ja", and "ki, ki, ke-ke-kukukrrr". Its calls include a "nasal 'rack' " and a "downslurred, dry 'krèeh' ".

== Status ==
The IUCN follows BirdLife International's taxonomy and so has assessed the pre-split "buff-throated" foliage gleaner as a whole. It is rated as being of Least Concern. It has an extremely large range, but its population size is not known and is believed to be decreasing. No immediate threats have been identified. It is considered common to fairly common.
