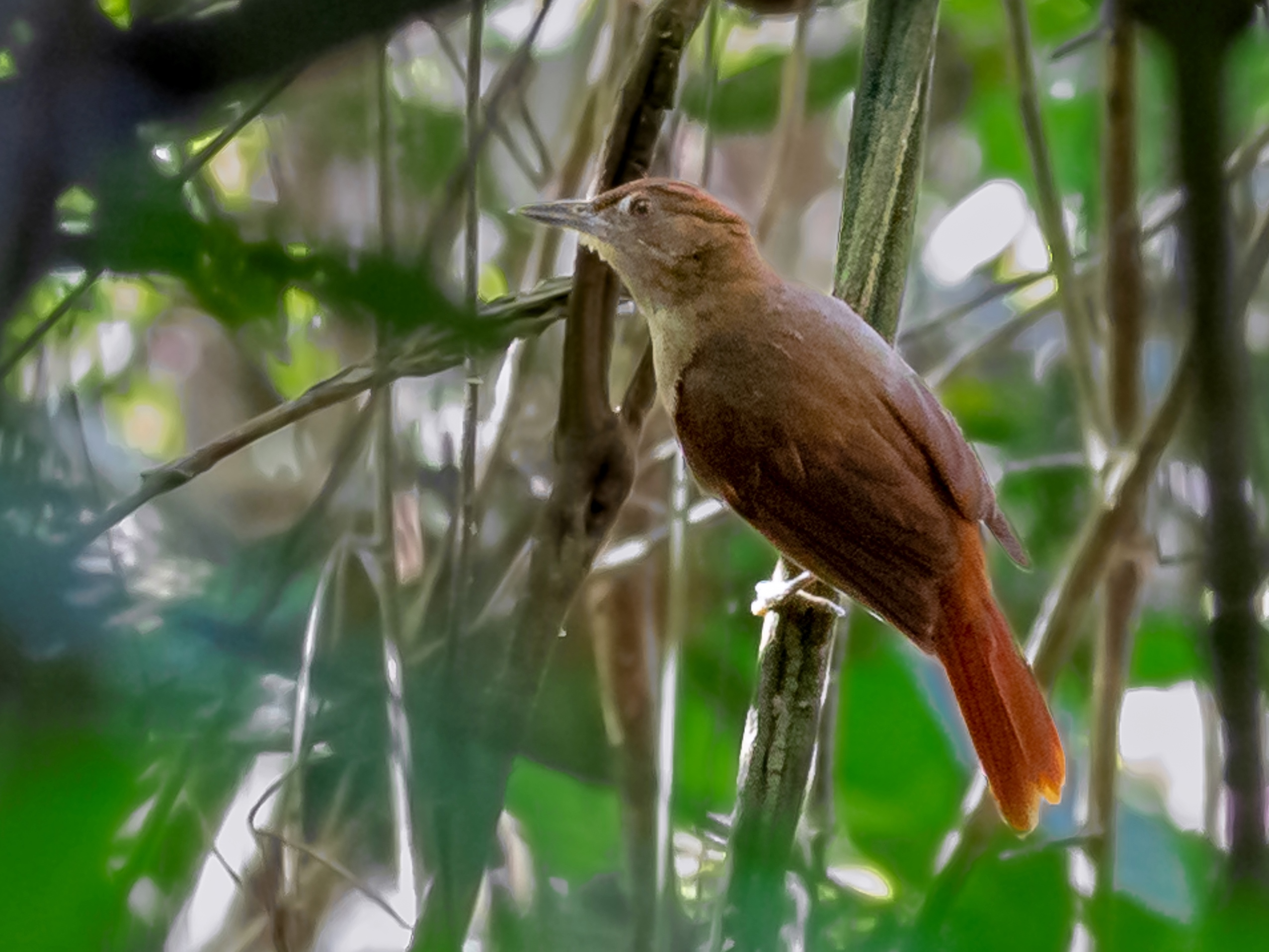
- At Serra dos Carajás, Pará, Brazil.

Conservation status
- Least Concern (IUCN 3.1)

Scientific classification
- Kingdom: Animalia
- Phylum: Chordata
- Class: Aves
- Order: Passeriformes
- Family: Furnariidae
- Genus: Automolus
- Species: A. rufipileatus

Binomial name
- Automolus rufipileatus (Pelzeln, 1859)

Synonyms
- Philydor consobrinus

= Chestnut-crowned foliage-gleaner =

Species of bird

The chestnut-crowned foliage-gleaner (Automolus rufipileatus) is a species of bird in the Furnariinae subfamily of the ovenbird family Furnariidae. It is found in Bolivia, Brazil, Colombia, Ecuador, French Guiana, Guyana, Peru, Suriname, and Venezuela.

== Taxonomy and systematics ==
The chestnut-crowned foliage-gleaner and the brown-rumped foliage-gleaner (A. melanopezus) are sister species. The chestnut-crowned has two subspecies, the nominate A. r. rufipileatus (Pelzeln, 1859) and A. r. consobrinus (Sclater, PL, 1870).

== Description ==
The chestnut-crowned foliage-gleaner is 18 to 19 cm (7.1 to 7.5 in) long and weighs 31 to 38 g (1.1 to 1.3 oz). The sexes have the same plumage. Adults of the nominate subspecies have a mostly rufescent brown face with a few buff streaks on the ear coverts. Their crown is dark reddish chestnut that becomes darkish warm olivaceous brown on the back. Their rump is reddish brown and their uppertail coverts reddish chestnut. Their wings are darkish rufescent brown with slightly darker primary coverts and ochraceous rufous at the bend. Their tail is dark dull chestnut. Their throat is bright buff that becomes pale buff-brown on the breast and belly. Their sides and flanks are medium dull brown and their undertail coverts dull rufescent brown. Their iris is yellow-orange to orange, their maxilla blackish to olive-gray, their mandible silvery horn to grayish olive, and their legs and feet greenish gray to yellowish olive. Juveniles have slightly duller and darker upperparts than adults and dusky edges on the breast and central belly feathers. Subspecies A. r. consobrinus has a more rufescent back and darker, more ochraceous underparts than the nominate.

== Distribution and habitat ==
The chestnut-crowned foliage-gleaner is found in every mainland South American country except Argentina, Chile, Paraguay, and Uruguay. Subspecies A. r. consobrinus has by far the larger range of the two. It is found in the northern and western Amazon Basin from eastern Colombia east across southern Venezuela, and the Guianas to the Atlantic and south through eastern Ecuador, eastern Peru, and western Brazil into northwestern Bolivia. The nominate subspecies is found in Brazil south of the Amazon between the Rio Purus and the state of Maranhão. The species primarily inhabits riverside and várzea forest, where it especially favors thickets of Guadua bamboo and Gynerium cane. It also occurs locally in bamboo patches within terra firme forest. In elevation it mostly ranges from sea level to 500 m (1,600 ft) though locally it may reach 1,300 m (4,300 ft).

== Behavior ==
=== Movement ===
The chestnut-crowned foliage-gleaner is a year-round resident throughout its range.

=== Feeding ===
The chestnut-crowned foliage-gleaner feeds mostly on a variety of insects and spiders; small tree frogs have also been recorded in its diet. It usually forages in pairs and seldom joins mixed-species feeding flocks. It feeds from the forest's undergrowth to its mid-storey, acrobatically gleaning and pulling prey from debris and especially from clumps of dead leaves.

=== Breeding ===
Almost nothing is known about the chestnut-crowned foliage-gleaner's breeding biology. Males found in breeding condition in February in Venezuela are the only hint to its breeding season.

=== Vocalization ===
The chestnut-crowned foliage-gleaner's song is a "run-together series of sharp, stacatto [sic] notes that drop in pitch, 'd-r-r-r-r-r-r-r-r-r' ". Another author described it as a "short, shivering, staccato trill 'kriiiiiiih' " that last about 1.5 seconds. Its call is "a peculiar, resonant, deep 'jyoo' or 'cheeu' ".

== Status ==
The IUCN has assessed the chestnut-crowned foliage-gleaner as being of Least Concern. It has an extremely large range, but its population size is not known and is believed to be decreasing. No immediate threats have been identified. It is considered uncommon to fairly common but its linear habitat along rivers "naturally limits its global population". It occurs in several protected areas.
