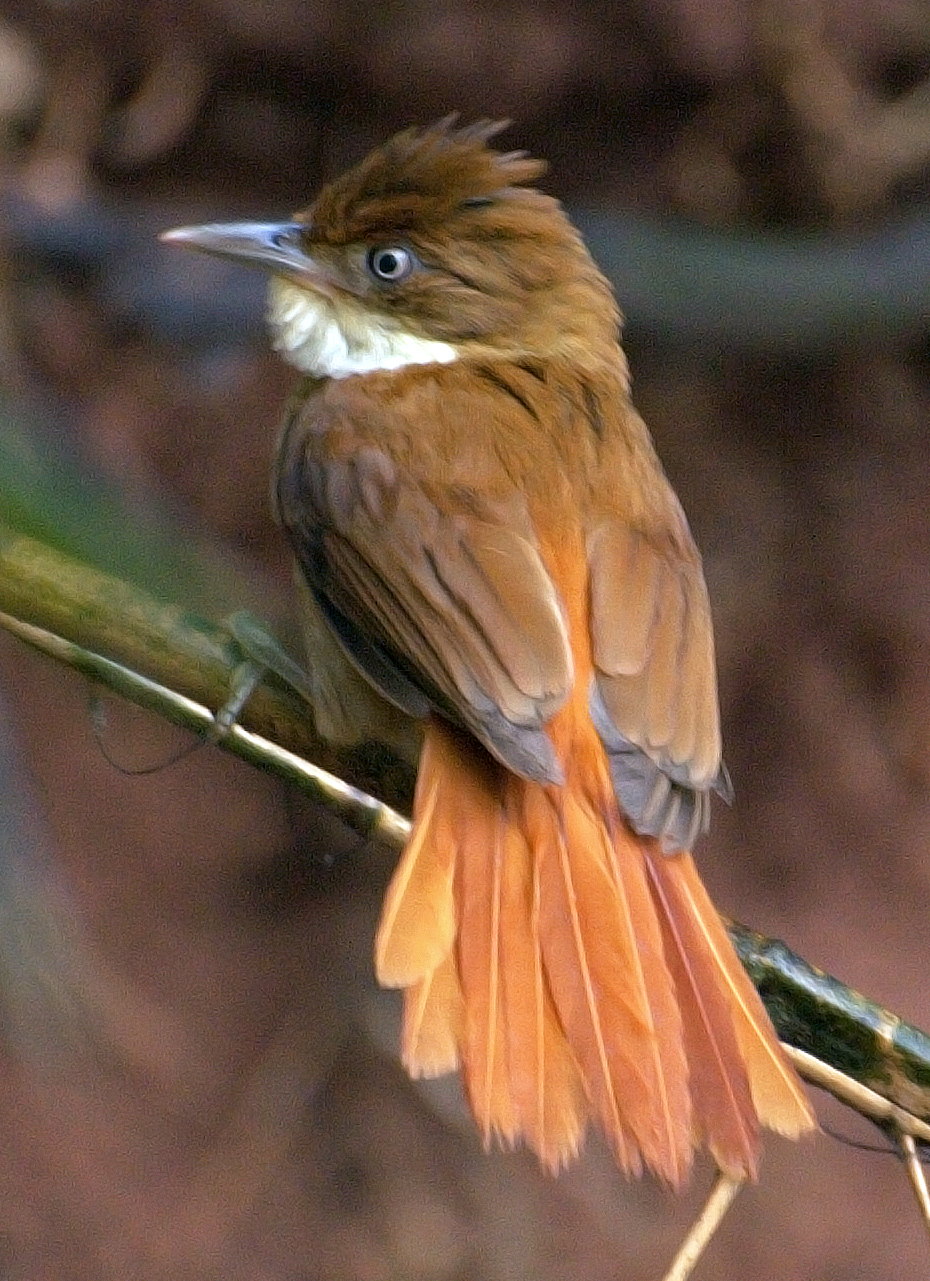

Conservation status
- Least Concern (IUCN 3.1)

Scientific classification
- Kingdom: Animalia
- Phylum: Chordata
- Class: Aves
- Order: Passeriformes
- Family: Furnariidae
- Genus: Automolus
- Species: A. leucophthalmus

Binomial name
- Automolus leucophthalmus (Wied, 1821)

= White-eyed foliage-gleaner =

Species of bird

The white-eyed foliage-gleaner (Automolus leucophthalmus) is a species of bird in the Furnariinae subfamily of the ovenbird family Furnariidae. It is found in Argentina, Brazil, and Paraguay.

== Taxonomy and systematics ==
The white-eyed foliage-gleaner has two subspecies, the nominate A. l. leucophthalmus (Wied, 1821) and A. l. sulphurascens (Lichtenstein, MHC, 1823). What is now the Pernambuco foliage-gleaner (A. lammi) was a third subspecies; following a 2008 publication, major taxonomic systems elevated it to species rank.

The white-eyed foliage-gleaner, Pernambuco foliage-gleaner, olive-backed foliage-gleaner (A. infuscatus), and Para foliage-gleaner (A. paraensis) form a superspecies.

== Description ==
The white-eyed foliage-gleaner is 18 to 20 cm (7.1 to 7.9 in) long and weighs 25 to 38 g (0.88 to 1.3 oz). It is a fairly large member of its genus and has a heavy bill. The sexes have the same plumage. Adults of the nominate subspecies have a dark brownish face with faint reddish streaks on the ear coverts, grizzled reddish brown and buffy lores, and a white malar area. Their crown is dark reddish brown with narrow rufous streaks. Their back and rump are dark reddish brown that blends to bright rufous uppertail coverts. Their wings are dark rufous with pale cinnamon at the bend. Their tail is bright rufous. Their throat and the sides of their neck are white and their center breast white that becomes bright buffy on the belly. The sides of their breast and flanks are ochraceous tawny and their undertail coverts pale rufous. Their iris is whitish, their maxilla brownish to black, their mandible greenish gray to pale gray, and their legs and feet grayish. Juveniles have a more uniformly colored crown and back than adults, with a slightly darker breast and belly and darker brown sides and flanks. Subspecies A. l. sulphurascens has a paler back, rump, and tail than the nominate, with a less brownish belly and less reddish brown on the flanks.

== Distribution and habitat ==
The nominate subspecies of the white-eyed foliage-gleaner has a limited range; it is found only in eastern Brazil's Bahia state. Subspecies A. l. sulphurascens is found in south-central and southeastern Brazil from Mato Grosso, Goiás, and Bahia south through Rio Grande do Sul and eastern Paraguay into northeastern Argentina's Misiones Province. The species inhabits tropical evergreen forest and mature secondary forest. In elevation it ranges from near sea level to about 1,000 m (3,300 ft), though it locally reaches 1,400 m (4,600 ft) and A. l. sulphurascens occurs mostly below 750 m (2,500 ft).

== Behavior ==
=== Movement ===
The white-eyed foliage-gleaner is a year-round resident throughout its range.

=== Feeding ===
The white-eyed foliage-gleaner feeds on a wide variety of arthropods both adult and larval, and snails are a minor part of its diet. It usually forages as part of a mixed-species feeding flock, and tends to mostly stay low in dense growth in the forest's understory. It gleans and pulls its prey from dead leaves, debris, and epiphytes. In some areas it feeds in stands of bamboo.

=== Breeding ===
The white-eyed foliage-gleaner is assumed to breed in the austral spring and summer, at least September to December. It is thought to be monogamous. It makes a cup nest of plant stems and leaf rachides in a chamber at the end of a tunnel it excavates in an earthen bank. The clutch size is three or four eggs. The incubation period, time to fledging, and details of parental care are not known.

=== Vocalization ===
The white-eyed foliage-gleaner's song is a "fast, rhythmic, liquid or grating 'tlewtlew---' ". Its call is a "high, sharp, nasal 'itew' ". It also makes "single-noted 'kwek' and double-noted 'kwek-kwaah' calls".

== Status ==
The IUCN has assessed the white-eyed foliage-gleaner as being of Least Concern. It has a large range, but its population size is not known and is believed to be decreasing. No immediate threats have been identified. It is considered uncommon to common and occurs in several protected areas. "Extensive deforestation within its range has dramatically reduced area of habitat available to this species, but it persists in small and degraded forest fragments, and appears to be reasonably tolerant of second growth." However, the nominate race is known from only a few sites and may merit threatened status.
