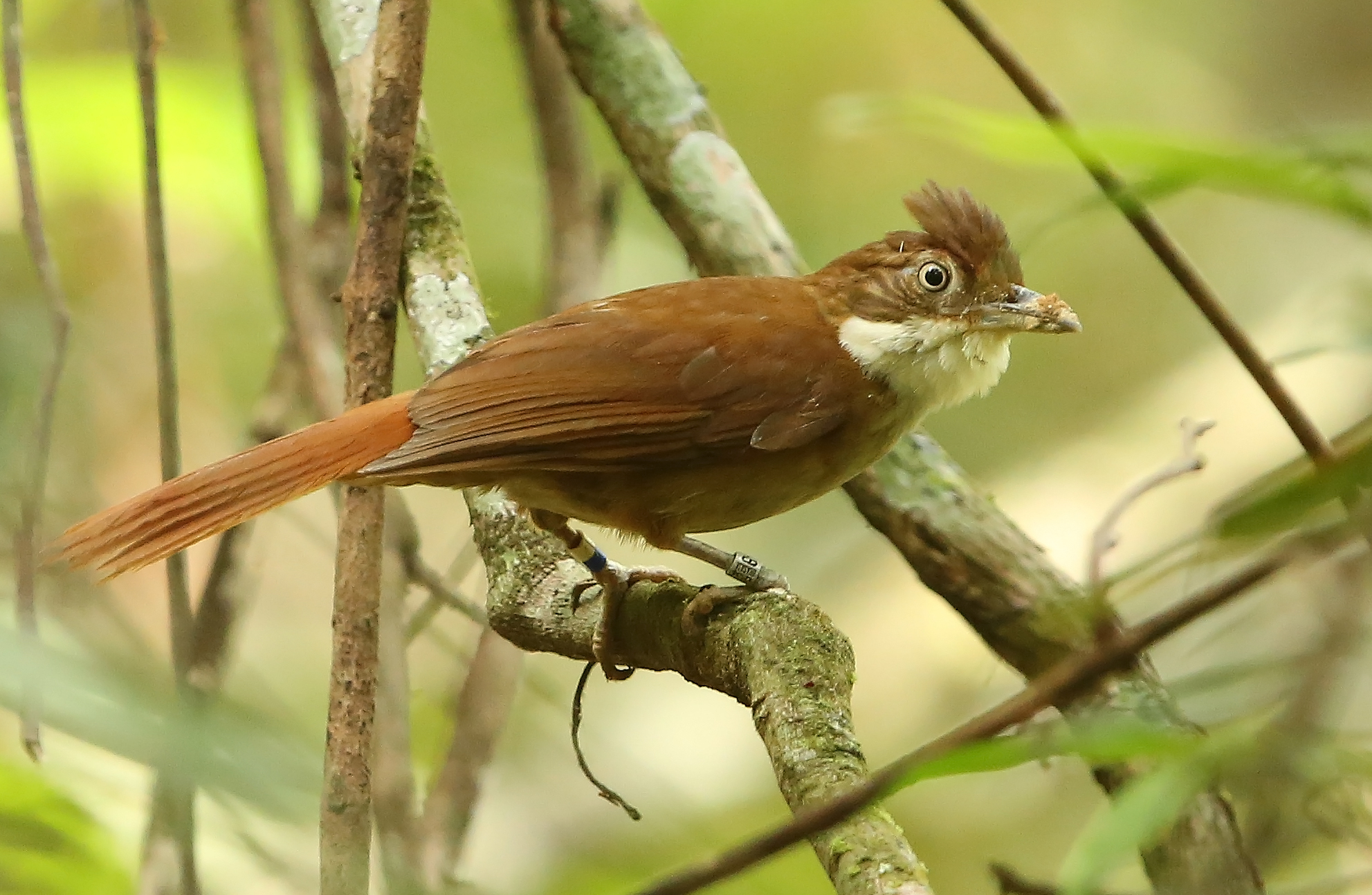

Conservation status
- Endangered (IUCN 3.1)

Scientific classification
- Kingdom: Animalia
- Phylum: Chordata
- Class: Aves
- Order: Passeriformes
- Family: Furnariidae
- Genus: Automolus
- Species: A. lammi

Binomial name
- Automolus lammi Zimmer, 1947

Synonyms
- Automolus leucophthalmus lammi

= Pernambuco foliage-gleaner =

Species of bird

The Pernambuco foliage-gleaner (Automolus lammi) is an endangered species of bird in the Furnariinae subfamily of the ovenbird family Furnariidae. It is endemic to northeastern Brazil.

== Taxonomy and systematics ==
The Pernambuco foliage-gleaner was previously treated as a subspecies of the white-eyed foliage-gleaner (A. leucophthalmus). Following a 2008 publication, major taxonomic systems elevated it to species rank.

The Pernambuco foliage-gleaner, white-eyed foliage-gleaner, olive-backed foliage-gleaner (A. infuscatus), and Para foliage-gleaner (A. paraensis) form a superspecies.

== Description ==
The Pernambuco foliage-gleaner is 19 to 20 cm (7.5 to 7.9 in) long. It is a fairly large member of its genus and has a heavy bill. The sexes have the same plumage, which is similar to that of the formerly conspecific white-eyed foliage-gleaner. Adults of the nominate subspecies have a dark brownish face with faint reddish streaks on the ear coverts, grizzled reddish brown and buffy lores, and a white malar area. Their crown is dark brown with narrow rufous streaks. Their back and rump are dark brown that blends to rufous uppertail coverts. Their wings are dark rufous with pale cinnamon at the bend. Their tail is bright rufous. Their throat and the sides of their neck are white with a yellow tinge, with a fairly sharp contrast with the creamy olive-buff breast and belly. The sides of their breast and flanks are brownish and their undertail coverts pale rufous. Their iris is whitish, their bill darkish, and their legs and feet grayish.

== Distribution and habitat ==
The Pernambuco foliage-gleaner is found in the Pernambuco Center of Endemism, in the far eastern Brazilian states of Paraíba, Pernambuco, Alagoas, and Sergipe. It inhabits tropical evergreen forest and mature secondary forest. In elevation it ranges from near sea level to about 550 m (1,800 ft).

== Behavior ==
=== Movement ===
The Pernambuco foliage-gleaner is a year-round resident throughout its range.

=== Feeding ===
Details about the Pernambuco foliage-gleaner's diet are lacking, though it is known to feed on arthropods. It usually forages as part of a mixed-species feeding flock, and tends to mostly stay low in dense growth in the forest's understory. It gleans and pulls its prey from dead leaves, debris, and epiphytes.

=== Breeding ===
Nothing is known about the Pernambuco foliage-gleaner's breeding biology.

=== Vocalization ===
The Pernambuco foliage-gleaner's song is what sets it apart from the white-eyed foliage-gleaner. It is "a strident series of 2–11 closely spaced (3–4/second), frequency-modulated notes or doublets, each with a particularly harsh, grating quality, but each doublet comprised a harsh note and a sharp thin note". Its call is loud "weck" notes that may be uttered up to 20 times. It also makes "kwek" and "kwek-kwaah" calls that are like those of the white-eyed foliage-gleaner.

== Status ==
The IUCN originally in 2014 assessed the Pernambuco foliage-gleaner as Vulnerable but in 2017 uplisted it to Endangered. It has a very limited range and its estimated population of between 1000 and 2500 mature individuals is believed to be decreasing. Its range "has suffered the catastrophic loss of forest for agricultural expansion, primarily sugar-cane production, with virtually all remaining forest existing in fragments". It does occur in a few protected areas, but some, like Murici Ecological Reserve, suffer from illegal logging.
