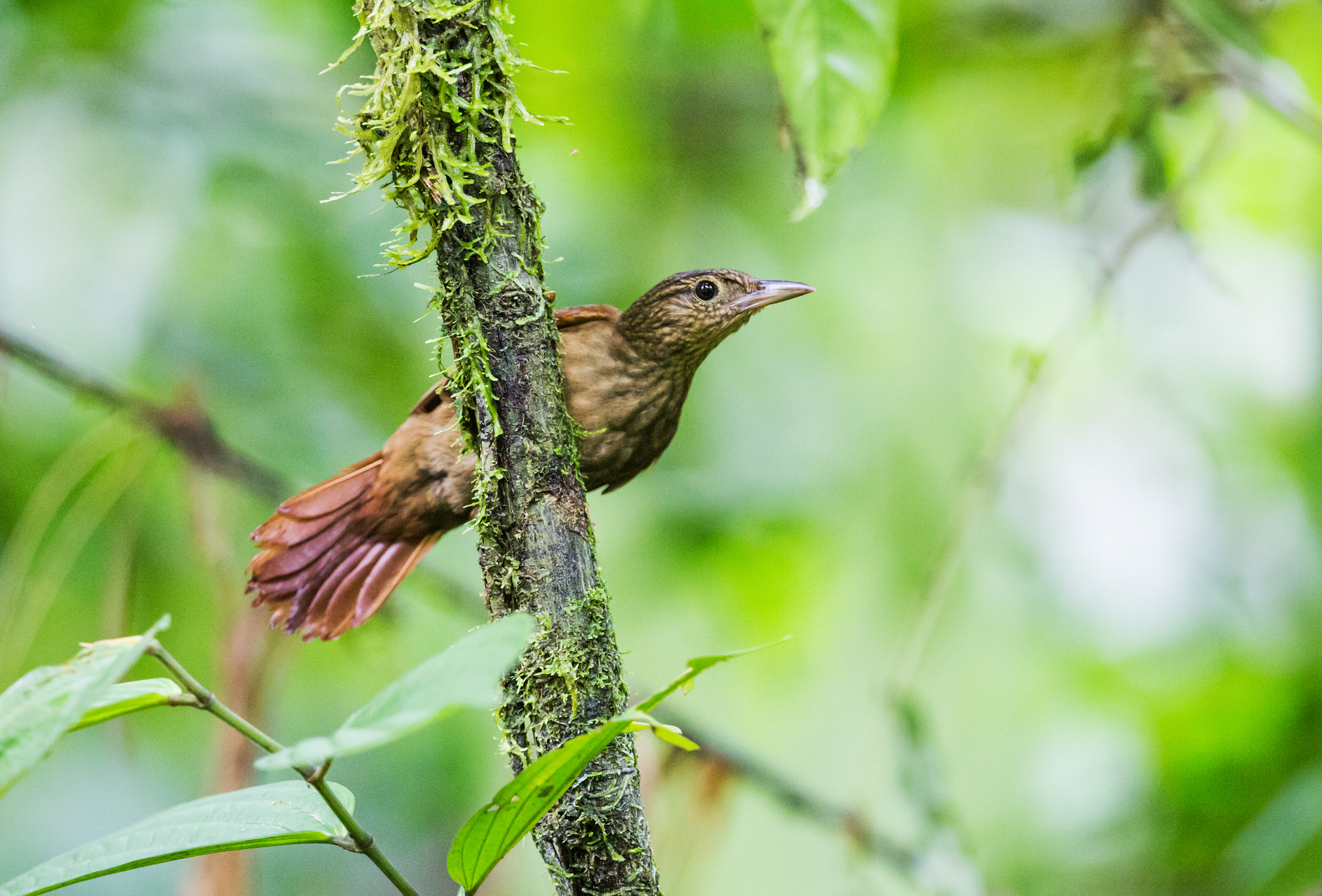

Conservation status
- Least Concern (IUCN 3.1)

Scientific classification
- Kingdom: Animalia
- Phylum: Chordata
- Class: Aves
- Order: Passeriformes
- Family: Furnariidae
- Genus: Automolus
- Species: A. virgatus

Binomial name
- Automolus virgatus (Lawrence, 1867)

Audio
- Call recorded in Ecuador

= Western woodhaunter =

Species of bird

The western woodhaunter (Automolus virgatus) is a species of bird in the Furnariinae subfamily of the ovenbird family Furnariidae. It is found in Colombia, Costa Rica, Ecuador, Honduras, Nicaragua, and Panama.

== Taxonomy and systematics ==
At one time what is now the western woodhaunter was included in genus Hyloctistes but molecular phylogenetic studies showed that Hyloctistes is embedded within Automolus.

Even before the generic merger, the western woodhaunter's taxonomy was unsettled, and it remains so. Its four subspecies were included with two others in what was then called the striped woodhaunter (then H. subulatus, later A. subulatus). In the early twenty-first century several authors split the four Central American and western South American subspecies from the striped woodhaunter and named the new species the western woodhaunter (then H. virgatus, now A. virgatus). They gave the remaining two subspecies the English name eastern woodhaunter and by the principle of priority retained the binomial A. subulatus for it. By late 2023 the International Ornithological Committee, BirdLife International's Handbook of the Birds of the World (HBW), and the Clements taxonomy adopted the split, though HBW calls A. subulatus the Amazonian woodhaunter. The North and South American Classification Committees of the American Ornithological Society (AOS) have not adopted the split but both subcommittees note that some authors suggest it.

The four subspecies of the western woodhaunter are:

- A. v. nicaraguae (Miller, W. & Griscom, 1925)
- A. v. virgatus (Lawrence, 1867)
- A. v. assimilis von Berlepsch & Taczanowski, 1884
- A. v. cordobae (Meyer de Schauensee, 1960)

== Description ==
The western woodhaunter is 17 to 18 cm (6.7 to 7.1 in) long and weighs about 35 g (1.2 oz). It is a fairly large member of its genus and has a shortish and heavy bill. The sexes have the same plumage. Adults of the nominate subspecies A. v. virgatus have a mostly dark brownish face with golden-buff streaks, a pale eyering and stripe behind the eye, and grizzled brownish and buff lores. Their crown is blackish brown with golden-buff streaks that widen as they extend onto the blackish brown back. Their rump is dull rusty olivaceous brown, their uppertail coverts deep reddish cinnamon, and their tail a lighter cinnamon than the uppertail coverts. Their wings are dull cinnamon brown with brownish black on the flight feathers. Their chin and throat are pale fawn with faint brownish feather edges. Their breast is a deeper fawn with dusky feather edges. Their belly, flanks, and undertail coverts are olivaceous brown. Their iris is brown, their bill brownish black with some yellow on the mandible, and their legs and feet brown. Subspecies A. v. nicaraguae has blackish brown upperparts and slightly lighter underparts than the nominate. A. v. assimilis has a more reddish brown back than the nominate, a darker chestnut-rufous rump, uppertail coverts, and tail, and a strong olivaceous wash on the breast. A. v. cordobae has an unstreaked back and nearly unmarked underparts.

== Distribution and habitat ==
The subspecies of the western woodhaunter are found thus:

- A. v. nicaraguae: southeastern Nicaragua with a few records in Honduras
- A. v. virgatus: Costa Rica into Panama as far as Veraguas Province
- A. v. assimilis: from Eastern Panama south through western Colombia and most of the length of western Ecuador
- A. v. cordobae: northern Colombia's Córdoba, Antioquia, Bolívar, Santander, and Boyacá departments

The western woodhaunter inhabits humid forest and woodlands in foothills and the lower montane zone. In elevation it mostly occurs below 1,100 m (3,600 ft), but locally reaches about 1,500 m (4,900 ft) in Costa Rica, Panama, and Ecuador.

== Behavior ==
=== Movement ===
The western woodhaunter is a year-round resident throughout its range.

=== Feeding ===
The western woodhaunter's diet is not known in detail but includes arthropods and small vertebrates. It usually forages singly and usually as part of a mixed-species feeding flock, from the forest understory to its middle levels. It searches for prey along large branches and vines, gleaning and probing among dead leaves, epiphytes, palm fronds and other vegetation. It has been noted "burrowing" into clumps and flinging aside debris to reach prey.

=== Breeding ===
The western woodhaunter's breeding season has not been fully defined but includes at least December to February and may begin much earlier. It excavates a tunnel in an earthen bank and builds a shallow cup nest of leaf rachides in a chamber at its end. The clutch size, incubation period, and time to fledging are not known. Both parents incubate the clutch and provision nestlings.

=== Vocalization ===
The western woodhaunter's song is described as "a series of sharp nasal notes, 'keeu-keeu-keeu-keeu...', evenly pitched and paced" and its call as "a sharp 'squirp!' ". The song has also been rendered as "kyip-kyip-kyip-kyip-kyip" and the call as "krrrk".

== Status ==
The IUCN has assessed the western woodhaunter as being of Least Concern. It has a large range, but its population size is not known and is believed to be decreasing. No immediate threats have been identified. It occurs in a few protected areas.
