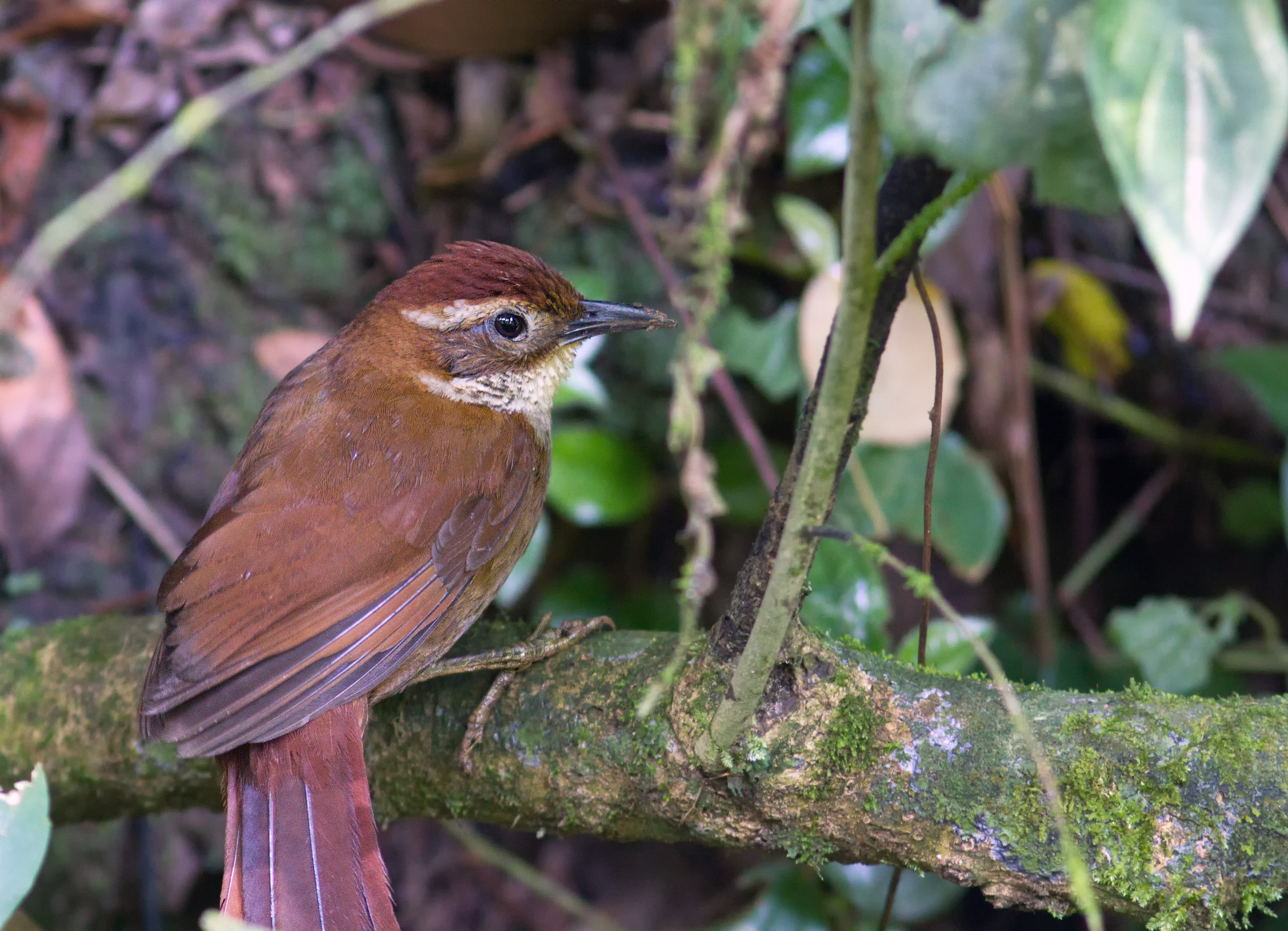

Conservation status
- Least Concern (IUCN 3.1)

Scientific classification
- Kingdom: Animalia
- Phylum: Chordata
- Class: Aves
- Order: Passeriformes
- Family: Furnariidae
- Genus: Clibanornis
- Species: C. dendrocolaptoides

Binomial name
- Clibanornis dendrocolaptoides (Pelzeln, 1859)

= Canebrake groundcreeper =

Species of bird

The canebrake groundcreeper (Clibanornis dendrocolaptoides) is a species of bird in the Furnariinae subfamily of the ovenbird family Furnariidae. It is found in Argentina, Brazil, and Paraguay.

== Taxonomy and systematics ==
The canebrake groundcreeper is monotypic. It and the henna-capped foliage-gleaner (C. rectirostris) are sister species and both are part of a larger complex of foliage-gleaners.

== Description ==
The canebrake groundcreeper is 20 to 22 cm (7.9 to 8.7 in) long and weighs 52 to 54 g (1.8 to 1.9 oz). It is a largish furnariid with an almost straight bill. The sexes have the same plumage. Adults have a narrow grayish or buff-gray supercilium that widens to the rear and dark brown lores on an otherwise dull reddish brown face. Their crown is dark chestnut-brown, their back and rump rufescent brown, and their uppertail coverts rufous-brown. Their wing coverts and flight feathers are also rufous-brown. Their tail's central pair of feathers are dull rufous-brown and the rest rufous-chestnut. Their throat is white with blackish speckles on the sides, their breast and belly dull grayish, their sides rufous-brown, and their flanks and undertail coverts ochraceous brown.Their iris is brown, their bill black, and their legs and feet olive-green to greenish gray. Juveniles have a plain buff-washed white throat, faint buff mottling on the breast, and a grayer belly than the nominate.

== Distribution and habitat ==
The canebrake groundcreeper is found in southeastern Brazil from São Paulo state south into Rio Grande do Sul and in northeastern Argentina's Misiones Province. There are also fairly old records and reports of single birds in eastern Paraguay but apparently no permanent residents. It inhabits montane and tropical lowland evergreen forest, where it favors hilly terrain and the forest edge and secondary forest. It tends to be near watercourses and frequents bamboo thickets and dense understory along them. In elevation it ranges from near sea level to 1,200 m (3,900 ft).

== Behavior ==
=== Movement ===
The canebrake groundcreeper is a year-round resident through most its range, but apparently transient in Paraguay.

=== Feeding ===
The canebrake groundcreeper's diet and foraging technique are largely unknown. It is usually seen in pairs in dense undergrowth, and is assumed to glean arthropod prey on or near the ground.

=== Breeding ===
Nothing is known about the canebrake groundcreeper's breeding biology.

=== Vocalization ===
The canebrake groundcreeper's song is a "[s]hort to long series of loud staccato 'chet' notes, often interspersed with harsh chatters".

== Status ==
The IUCN first assessed the canebrake groundcreeper in 1988 as Threatened, then in 2000 as Vulnerable, then in 2004 as Near Threatened, and since 2022 as being of Least Concern. It has a somewhat restricted range and an estimated population of between 20,000 and 50,000 mature individuals. The latter is believed to be decreasing. "The species is threatened by the degradation, destruction and fragmentation of its Atlantic forest habitat" but "is commonly found along edges and in second growth, and is reported to persist in small forest fragments". It occurs in several protected areas.
