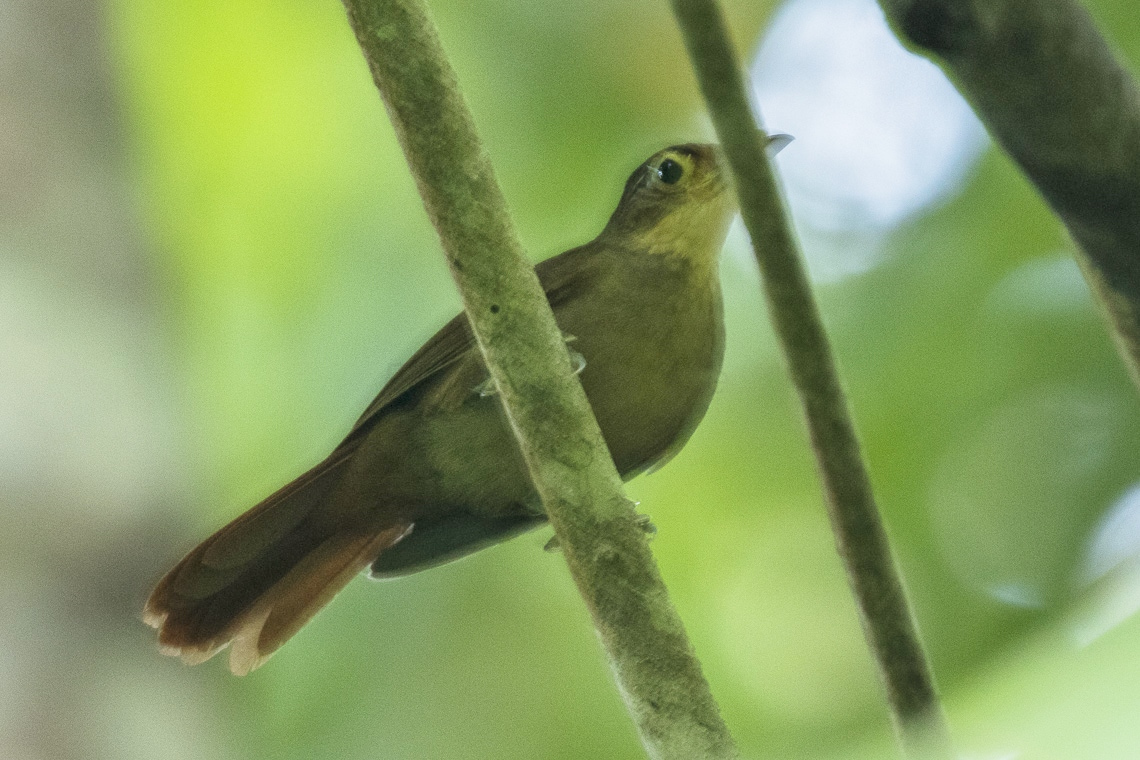

Conservation status
- Least Concern (IUCN 3.1)

Scientific classification
- Kingdom: Animalia
- Phylum: Chordata
- Class: Aves
- Order: Passeriformes
- Family: Furnariidae
- Genus: Automolus
- Species: A. exsertus

Binomial name
- Automolus exsertus Bangs, 1901

= Chiriqui foliage-gleaner =

Species of bird

The Chiriqui foliage-gleaner (Automolus exsertus) is a species of bird in the Furnariinae subfamily of the ovenbird family Furnariidae. It is found in Costa Rica and Panama.

== Taxonomy and systematics ==
The Chiriqui foliage-gleaner was originally described as a species but soon was reconsidered as a subspecies of what is now the ochre-throated foliage-gleaner (A. ochrolaemus). A 2017 publication detailed significant differences in its plumage and vocalizations from the other ochre-throated subspecies. Based on that data, the North American Classification Committee of the American Ornithological Society, the International Ornithological Committee, and the Clements taxonomy elevated it to a full species. As of late 2023, BirdLife International's Handbook of the Birds of the World (HBW) still treats the taxon as a subspecies of A. ochrolaemus, which it calls the buff-throated foliage-gleaner.

The Chiriqui foliage-gleaner is monotypic.

== Description ==
The Chiriqui foliage-gleaner is 18 to 20 cm (7.1 to 7.9 in) long and weighs 30 to 46 g (1.1 to 1.6 oz). It is a fairly large member of its genus and has a heavy bill. The sexes have the same plumage. Adults have a primarily dark brownish face with a bold buff eyering, faint reddish streaks on the ear coverts, and a slightly buffy malar area. Their crown and nape are dark brown with a faint blackish brown scallop pattern. Their back and rump are rich dark brown that blends to dark chestnut uppertail coverts. Their wing coverts are rich dark brown and their flight feathers slightly paler and more rufescent. Their tail is dark chestnut. Their throat is ochraceous-buff, their breast is streaked with medium brown and ochraceous buff that fades in its lower part, and their belly is brown. Their flanks are a darker and more rufescent brown and their undertail coverts bright rufous. Their iris is brown to dark brown, their maxilla blackish horn to horn-brown, their mandible horn to gray, and their legs and feet olive, greenish brown, or greenish gray.

== Distribution and habitat ==
The Chiriqui foliage-gleaner is found on the Pacific slope from Costa Rica south of the dry northwest into western Panama as far as Veraguas Province. It inhabits tropical evergreen forest, mature secondary forest, and coffee plantations from sea level to 1,400 m (4,600 ft).

== Behavior ==
=== Movement ===
The Chiriqui foliage-gleaner is a year-round resident throughout its range.

=== Feeding ===
The Chiriqui foliage-gleaner feeds mostly on a variety of insects, spiders, and vertebrates like small lizards. It forages singly or in pairs and often (perhaps usually) joins mixed-species feeding flocks. It forages from the forest's dense undergrowth to its lower mid-storey, acrobatically gleaning and pulling prey from epiphytes, debris, and especially from clumps of dead leaves as it hops along branches and vines. It has also been observed foraging on the ground by flipping aside leaf litter.

=== Breeding ===
The Chiriqui foliage-gleaner's breeding season spans from February to May. It is monogamous. It excavates a tunnel up to about 0.75 m (2.5 ft) long in an earthen bank and constructs a shallow cup nest of leaf rachides in a chamber at its end. The clutch size is two or three eggs. The incubation period is 20 to 21 days and fledging occurs about 18 days after hatch. Both parents incubate the clutch and provision the nestlings.

=== Vocalization ===
The Chiriqui foliage-gleaner's song is "a loud, harsh rattle lasting 2–5 seconds, repeated 10–30 times per minute". Its call is "a nasal rack or hard tchehrr.

== Status ==
The IUCN follows BirdLife International's taxonomy and so has assessed the pre-split buff-throated foliage gleaner as a whole, with no separate evaluation of the Chiriqui foliage-gleaner. The species is considered common to fairly common and appears to tolerate some forest fragmentation.
