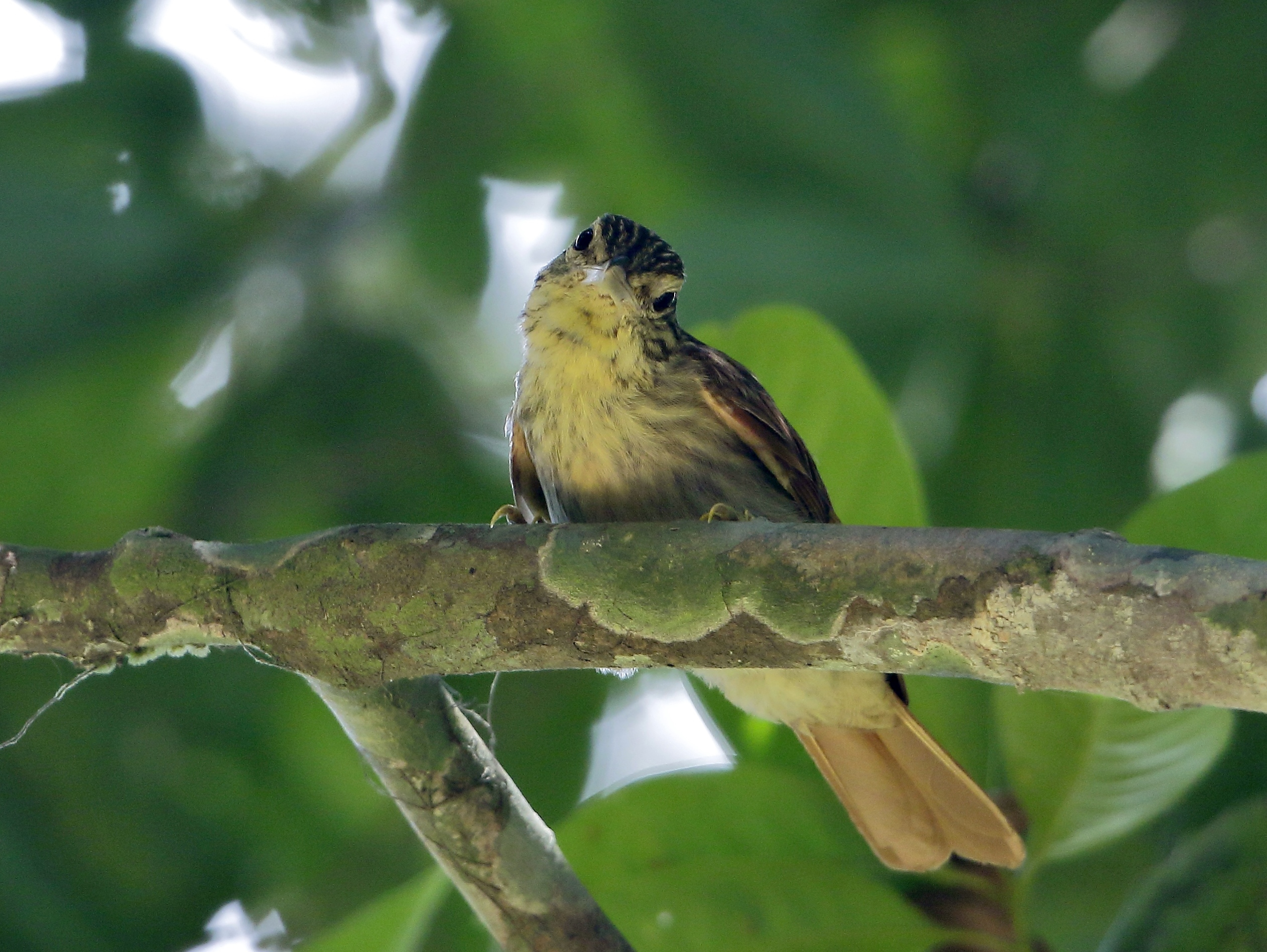

Conservation status
- Least Concern (IUCN 3.1)

Scientific classification
- Kingdom: Animalia
- Phylum: Chordata
- Class: Aves
- Order: Passeriformes
- Family: Furnariidae
- Genus: Automolus
- Species: A. subulatus

Binomial name
- Automolus subulatus (Spix, 1824)

Synonyms
- Hyloctistes subulatus

Audio
- Call recorded in Ecuador

= Eastern woodhaunter =

Species of bird

The eastern woodhaunter (Automolus subulatus), also known as the Amazonian woodhaunter, is a species of bird in the Furnariinae subfamily of the ovenbird family Furnariidae. It is found in Bolivia, Brazil, Colombia, Ecuador, Peru, and Venezuela.

== Taxonomy and systematics ==
At one time what is now the eastern woodhaunter was included in genus Hyloctistes but molecular phylogenetic studies showed that Hyloctistes is embedded within Automolus.

Even before the generic merger, the eastern woodhaunter's taxonomy was unsettled, and it remains so. Its two subspecies were included with four others in what was then called the striped woodhaunter. In the early twenty-first century several authors split the four Central American and western South American subspecies from the striped woodhaunter and named the new species the western woodhaunter (then H. virgatus, now A. virgatus). They gave the remaining two subspecies the English name "eastern woodhaunter" and by the principle of priority retained the binomial A. subulatus. By late 2023 the International Ornithological Committee, BirdLife International's Handbook of the Birds of the World (HBW), and the Clements taxonomy had adopted the split, though HBW calls A. subulatus the Amazonian woodhaunter. The North and South American Classification Committees of the American Ornithological Society (AOS) have not adopted the split though both subcommittees note that some authors suggest it.

The two subspecies of the eastern woodhaunter are the nominate A. s. subulatus (Spix, 1824) and A. s. lemae (Phelps & Phelps Jr, 1960).

== Description ==
The eastern woodhaunter is 17 to 18 cm (6.7 to 7.1 in) long and weighs about 25 to 38 g (0.88 to 1.3 oz). It is a fairly large member of its genus and has a shortish and heavy bill. The sexes have the same plumage. Adults of the nominate subspecies have a mostly dark brownish face with golden-buff streaks, a pale eyering and stripe behind the eye, and grizzled brownish and buff lores. Their crown is dark brownish with golden-buff streaks that widen as they extend onto the rich dark brown upper back. Their lower back, rump, and uppertail coverts are chestnut. Their wings are mostly rufescent brown and their tail chestnut. Their chin is light buff brown with faint darker streaks that become more visible on the lower throat. Their breast is dull medium brown with wide, blurry, golden-buff streaks that fade before the rich tawny brown belly is reached. Their flanks are a darker brown. Their iris is dark brown, their maxilla black to dusky brown, their mandible paler yellowish or bluish gray, and their legs and feet slate gray to olive-gray. Juveniles have less distinct streaking overall and slightly paler underparts than adults. Subspecies A. s. lemae is overall more olivaceous than the nominate, including its back, breast, belly, and its streaking. It also has a more yellowish chin.

== Distribution and habitat ==
The nominate subspecies of the eastern woodhaunter is found in southern Venezuela, southeastern Colombia, eastern Ecuador and Peru, northern Bolivia, and Brazil on both sides of the Amazon to the Rio Negro and beyond that south of the Amazon to Pará state. Subspecies A. s. lemae is found only in Sierra de Lema in the southeastern Venezuelan state of Bolívar. The nominate subspecies primarily inhabits tropical evergreen forest, both várzea and terra firme, and is also found in older secondary forest. A. s. lemae inhabits lower montane evergreen forest. In elevation it mostly occurs below 1,100 m (3,600 ft) but locally reaches 1,400 m (4,600 ft) in Peru and 1,700 m (5,600 ft) in Ecuador.

== Behavior ==
=== Movement ===
The eastern woodhaunter is a year-round resident throughout its range.

=== Feeding ===
The eastern woodhaunter's diet is not known in detail but includes arthropods and small vertebrates. It usually forages singly and usually as part of a mixed-species feeding flock, from the forest understory to its middle levels. It searches for prey along large branches and vines, gleaning and probing among dead leaves, epiphytes, palm fronds and other vegetation. It has been noted "burrowing" into clumps and flinging aside debris to reach prey.

=== Breeding ===
The eastern woodhaunter's breeding season has not been fully defined but includes at least August to November and may begin much earlier. It excavates a tunnel in an earthen bank and builds a shallow cup nest of leaf rachides in a chamber at its end. All of the documented clutches have been of two eggs. The incubation period and time to fledging are not known. Both parents incubate the clutch and provision nestlings.

=== Vocalization ===
The eastern woodhaunter mostly sings at dawn and dusk, but also intermittently during the day. It typically sings from a perch in the forest's middle level. Its song is "two (occasionally up to four) loud downslurred whistled notes, followed by a softer, low-pitched rattle: tyeew-tyew-trrrrrrrr", though sometimes the rattle is omitted. Its most common call is a "strident, emphatic short kirk!" that is repeated many times. The call is also described as "squirp!" and "kreeut".

== Status ==
The IUCN has assessed the eastern woodhaunter as being of Least Concern. It has an extremely large range, but its population size is not known and is believed to be decreasing. No immediate threats have been identified. It occurs in a few protected areas, but "[o]ngoing deforestation is likely an issue throughout the species' range".
