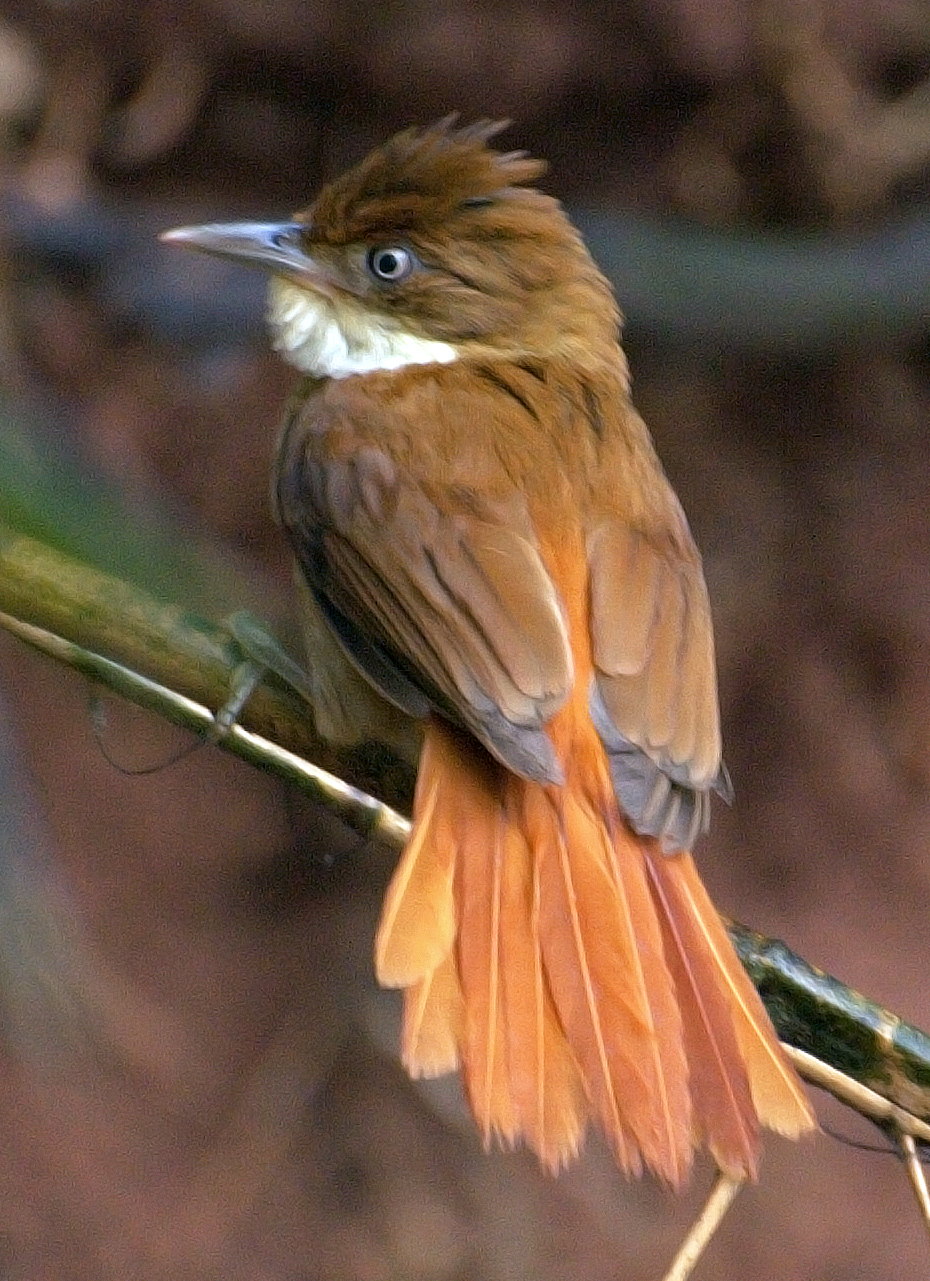
- White-eyed foliage-gleaner (Automolus leucophthalmus)

Scientific classification
- Kingdom: Animalia
- Phylum: Chordata
- Class: Aves
- Order: Passeriformes
- Family: Furnariidae
- Genus: Automolus; Reichenbach, 1853

Type species
- Sphenura sulphurascens White-eyed foliage-gleaner Lichtenstein, MHK, 1823

= Automolus =

Genus of birds

Automolus is a genus of bird in the ovenbird family Furnariidae.

== Taxonomy ==
The genus Automolus was introduced in 1853 by the German naturalist Ludwig Reichenbach to accommodate the taxon Sphenura sulphurascens Lichtenstein, now treated as a subspecies of the white-eyed foliage-gleaner. The name is from the Ancient Greek automolos meaning "deserter".

=== Species ===
The genus contains 11 species:

Image	Scientific name	Common Name	Distribution
	Automolus rufipileatus	Chestnut-crowned foliage-gleaner	Amazonia
	Automolus melanopezus	Brown-rumped foliage-gleaner	western Amazonia
	Automolus cervinigularis	Fawn-throated foliage-gleaner	Central America
	Automolus ochrolaemus	Ochre-throated foliage-gleaner	Tumbes–Chocó–Magdalena and Amazonia
	Automolus exsertus	Chiriqui foliage-gleaner	southern Costa Rica and Panama
	Automolus virgatus	Western woodhaunter	Nicaragua to Ecuador
	Automolus subulatus	Eastern woodhaunter	Amazonia
	Automolus infuscatus	Olive-backed foliage-gleaner	Amazonia (north of Madeira River)
	Automolus paraensis	Para foliage-gleaner	Amazonia (south of Madeira River)
	Automolus lammi	Pernambuco foliage-gleaner	Pernambuco coastal forests
	Automolus leucophthalmus	White-eyed foliage-gleaner	southeastern Brazil, Paraguay and selva misionera

The tepui foliage-gleaner has been placed in this genus, but behavior, voice, and morphology all point to it belonging in Syndactyla, and molecular data confirmed this hypothesis.

The eastern woodhaunter was formerly placed in its own genus Hyloctistes but molecular evidence showed that it was nested in Automolus. The ruddy foliage-gleaner and the Santa Marta foliage-gleaner, formerly placed in Automolus, are actually more closely related to Clibanornis foliage-gleaners.
