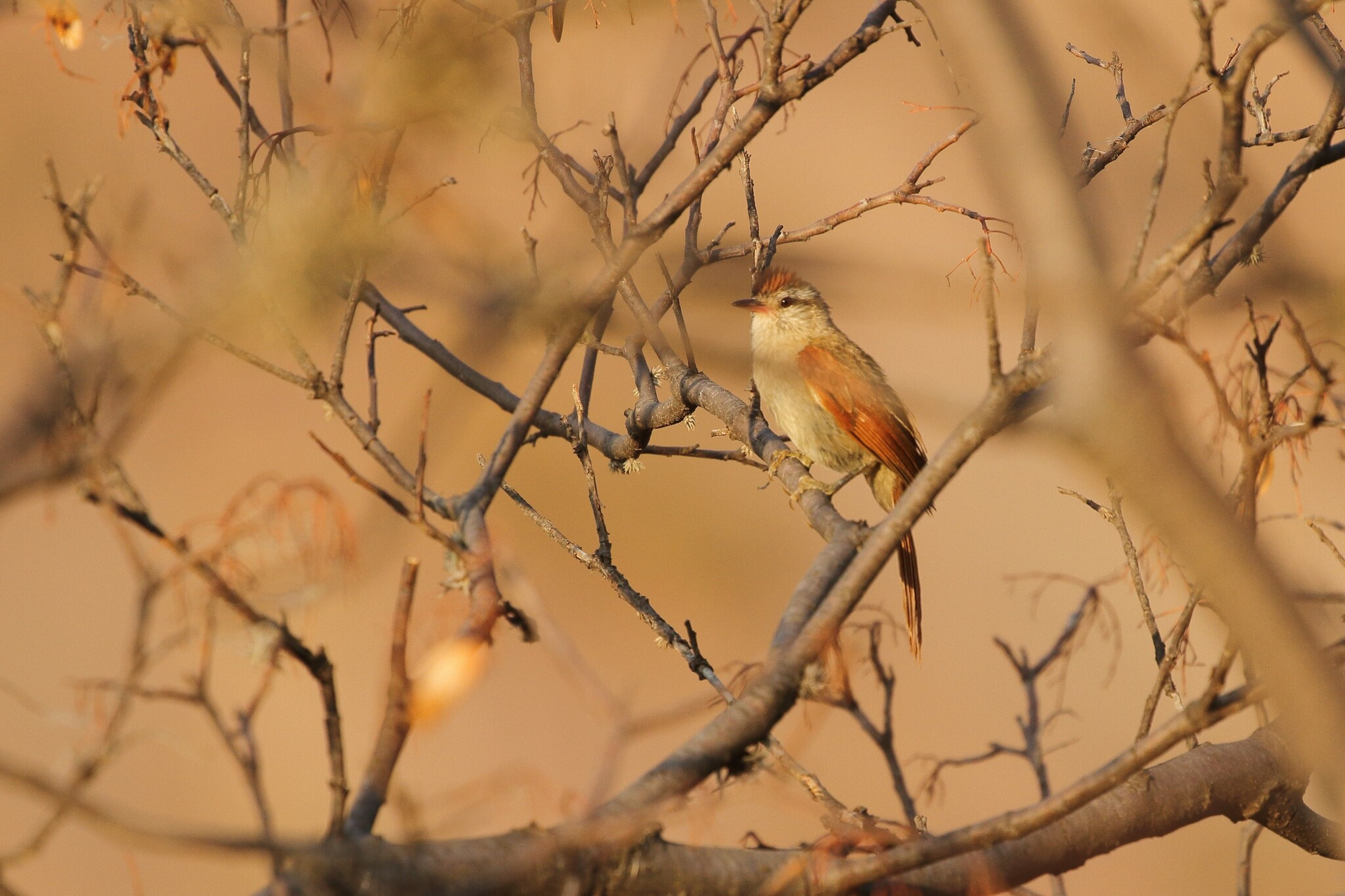

Conservation status
- Vulnerable (IUCN 3.1)

Scientific classification
- Kingdom: Animalia
- Phylum: Chordata
- Class: Aves
- Order: Passeriformes
- Family: Furnariidae
- Genus: Cranioleuca
- Species: C. henricae

Binomial name
- Cranioleuca henricae Maijer & Fjeldså, 1997

= Bolivian spinetail =

Species of bird

The Bolivian spinetail (Cranioleuca henricae) is a vulnerable species of bird in the Furnariinae subfamily of the ovenbird family Furnariidae. It is endemic to Bolivia.

== Taxonomy and systematics ==
The Bolivian spinetail was discovered in 1993 near Inquisivi, in the department of La Paz, and formally described in 1997. Maijer and Fjeldså hypothesized that it is related to the line-cheeked spinetail (C. antisiensis), creamy-crested spinetail (C. albicapilla), olive spinetail (C. obsoleta), pallid spinetail (C. pallida), and stripe-crowned spinetail (C. pyrrhophia). Later phylogenetic data confirmed that all of these except the line-cheeked are closely related to the Bolivian spinetail.

The Bolivian spinetail is monotypic.

== Description ==
The Bolivian spinetail is 14.5 to 15 cm (5.7 to 5.9 in) long. The sexes have the same plumage. Adults have a white supercilium and dirty white lores with black tips on an otherwise gray face. Their crown is rufous with buff and gray speckles on the forecrown. Their nape and back are light brownish olive, their rump tawny olive, and their uppertail coverts cinnamon brown. Their tail is rufous with a faint dusky wash on the innermost pair of feathers. Their wings are rufous with grayish brown inner webs on the primary coverts and fuscous tips to the flight feathers. Their chin and upper throat are dirty white and the rest of their underparts are light grayish olive with a faint buff tinge. Their iris is warm brown, their bill pink with a sooty tip to the mandible, and their legs and feet olive yellow or olivaceous. What is thought to be a juvenile had a crown the same color as the adult's back and a less distinct supercilium.

== Distribution and habitat ==
The Bolivian spinetail is found only in a few valleys in Bolivia's northern and central Andes. Documented and sight records have come from a few locations in the departments of La Paz and Cochabamba. It inhabits deciduous forest, sometimes with columnar cacti and low bushes, and sometimes epiphytic lichens and Tillandsia on the trees. In elevation it is known to range between 1,600 and 2,300 m (5,200 and 7,500 ft) and might occur as high as 3,300 m (10,800 ft).

== Behavior ==
=== Movement ===
The Bolivian spinetail is a year-round resident in its range.

=== Feeding ===
The Bolivian spinetail feeds on arthropods but details are lacking. During the breeding season it apparently forages in pairs and joins mixed-species feeding flocks in other seasons. It typically forages in the forest's lower levels, between 1 and 4 m (3 and 13 ft) above the ground, gleaning prey from bark and foliage.

=== Breeding ===
Nothing is known about the Bolivian spinetail's breeding biology except that what was thought to be a juvenile was seen in January.

=== Vocalization ===
The Bolivian spinetail's "short song" is "a bouncy, accelerating and descending series, lasting from 1 s to 2.5 s, rarely up to 3.8 s". Its "long song" is an "irregular and fast series ... from 3.5-13.5 s. Most songs wind up and down in pitch but with an overall tendency to descend". Its calls are "single notes, double or triple notes, or as a short churr".

== Status ==
The IUCN originally assessed the Bolivian spinetail as Endangered but since 2019 has rated it as Vulnerable. It "has a small range, in which suitable habitat is declining in quantity and quality. The population is very small [approximately 1500 mature individuals and decreasing]. The species occurs in two disjunct subpopulations, but the status of one of them is unclear. The species may qualify for a higher threat category in the future." A host of processes threaten it: logging, conversion of forest to Eucalyptus plantations and grazing land, fire, landslides, and climate change do or can contribute to its decline.
