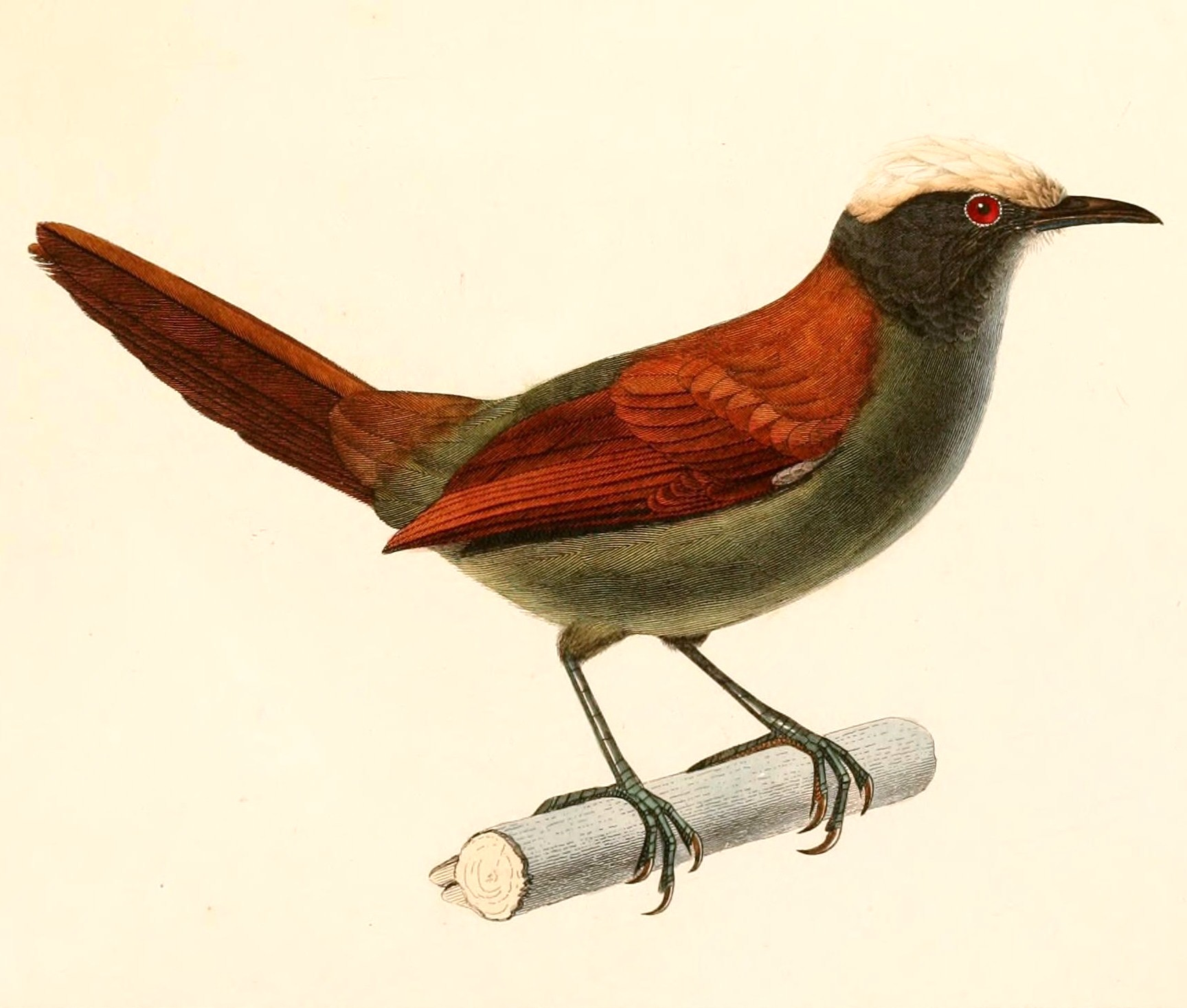

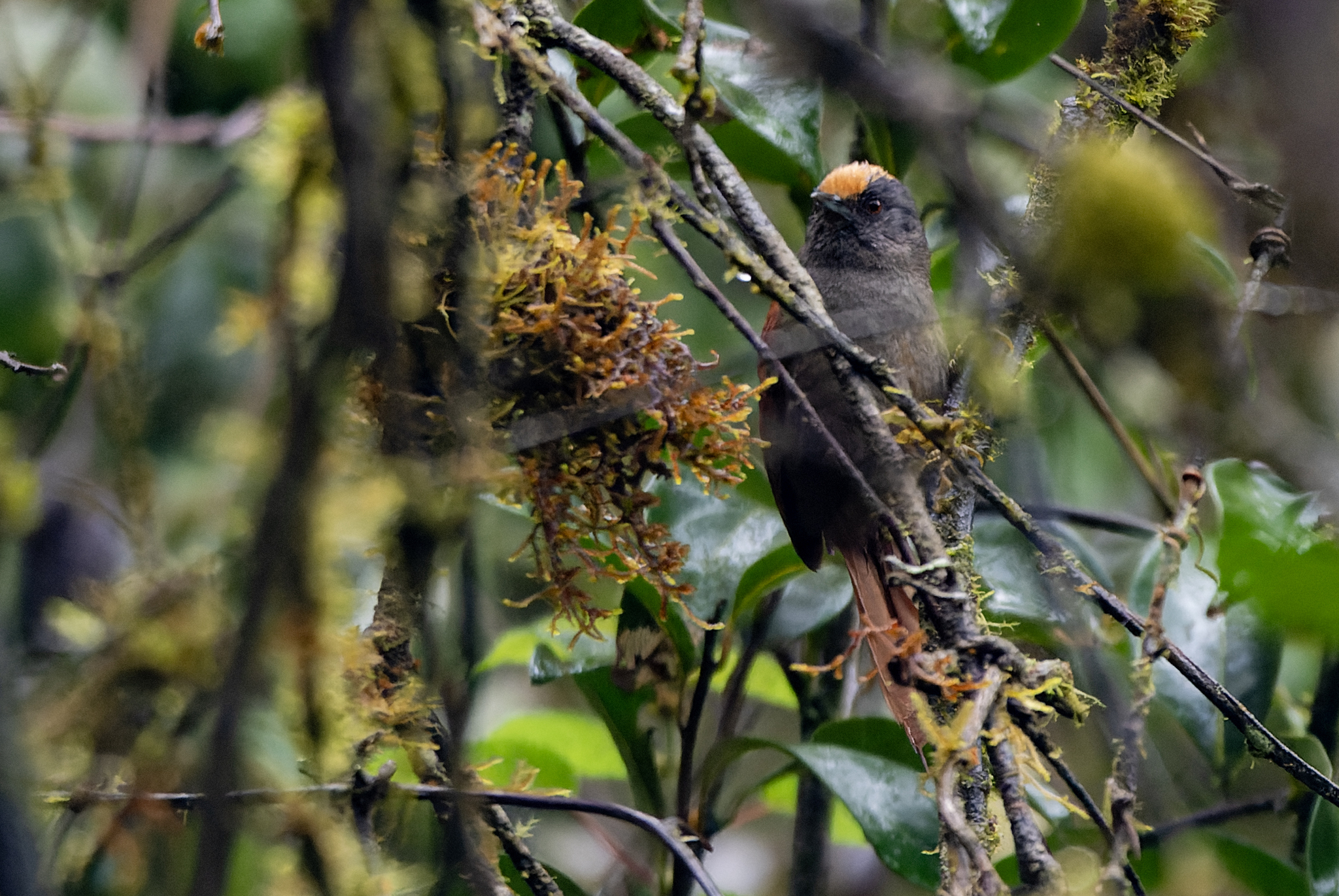

Conservation status
- Least Concern (IUCN 3.1)

Scientific classification
- Kingdom: Animalia
- Phylum: Chordata
- Class: Aves
- Order: Passeriformes
- Family: Furnariidae
- Genus: Cranioleuca
- Species: C. albiceps

Binomial name
- Cranioleuca albiceps (D'Orbigny & Lafresnaye, 1837)

= Light-crowned spinetail =

Species of bird

The light-crowned spinetail (Cranioleuca albiceps) is a species of bird in the Furnariinae subfamily of the ovenbird family Furnariidae. It is found in Bolivia and Peru.

== Taxonomy and systematics ==
The light-crowned spinetail, the Marcapata spinetail (C. marcapatae), and the Vilcabamba spinetail (C. weskei) are sister species. The light-crowned spinetail has two subspecies, the nominate C. a. albiceps (D'Orbigny & Lafresnaye, 1837) and C. a. discolor (Zimmer, JT, 1935).

== Description ==
The light-crowned spinetail is 14 to 15 cm (5.5 to 5.9 in) long and weighs 13 to 17 g (0.46 to 0.60 oz). The sexes have the same plumage. Adults of the nominate subspecies have a dark gray-brown supercilium with a black line above it and some blackish around the eye on an otherwise dark grayish brown face. Their forehead is ocraceous buff and their crown white to buffy or tawny. Their hindneck and sides of the neck have a dark brownish "collar". Their back is reddish chestnut that becomes duller and browner on the rump and uppertail coverts. Their tail is reddish chestnut; the feathers are pointed and their ends lack barbs giving a spiny appearance. Their wings are reddish chestnut with dark fuscous tips on the flight feathers. Their throat is grayish white and their breast and belly olivaceous brownish. Their iris is dark red to reddish brown, their maxilla blackish, their mandible silvery horn to bluish gray (sometimes with a dark tip), and their legs and feet greenish gray to dull olive-green. Subspecies C. a. discolor has an ochraceous to deep buff crown and a grayer throat and breast than the nominate.

== Distribution and habitat ==
The nominate subspecies of the light-crowned spinetail is found in the Andes of the Department of Puno in far southern Peru and in northern Bolivia's La Paz and Cochabamba departments. C. a. discolor is found in the Andes of central Bolivia from Cochabamba into western Santa Cruz Department. The species inhabits montane evergreen forest where it favors areas with Chusquea bamboo. In elevation it ranges from 2,200 to 3,400 m (7,200 to 11,200 ft).

== Behavior ==
=== Movement ===
The light-crowned spinetail is a year-round resident throughout its range.

=== Feeding ===
The light-crowned spinetail feeds on arthropods. It typically forages in pairs as members of a mixed-species feeding flock. It mostly forages in the forest's mid-storey and edges. It gleans its prey acrobatically from bark and live and dead leaves while hitching along branches and sometimes trunks.

=== Breeding ===
The light-crowned spinetail is thought to be monogamous. Its nest is an oval mass of moss with a side entrance wrapped around a Chusquea bamboo branch. Nothing else is known about its breeding biology.

=== Vocalization ===
The light-crowned spinetail's song is "a descending series of 6-10 evenly spaced notes" and its call "a long, excited trill".

== Status ==
The IUCN has assessed the light-crowned spinetail as being of Least Concern. It has a restricted range and an unknown population size; the latter is believed to be stable. No immediate threats have been identified. It is considered "fairly common".
