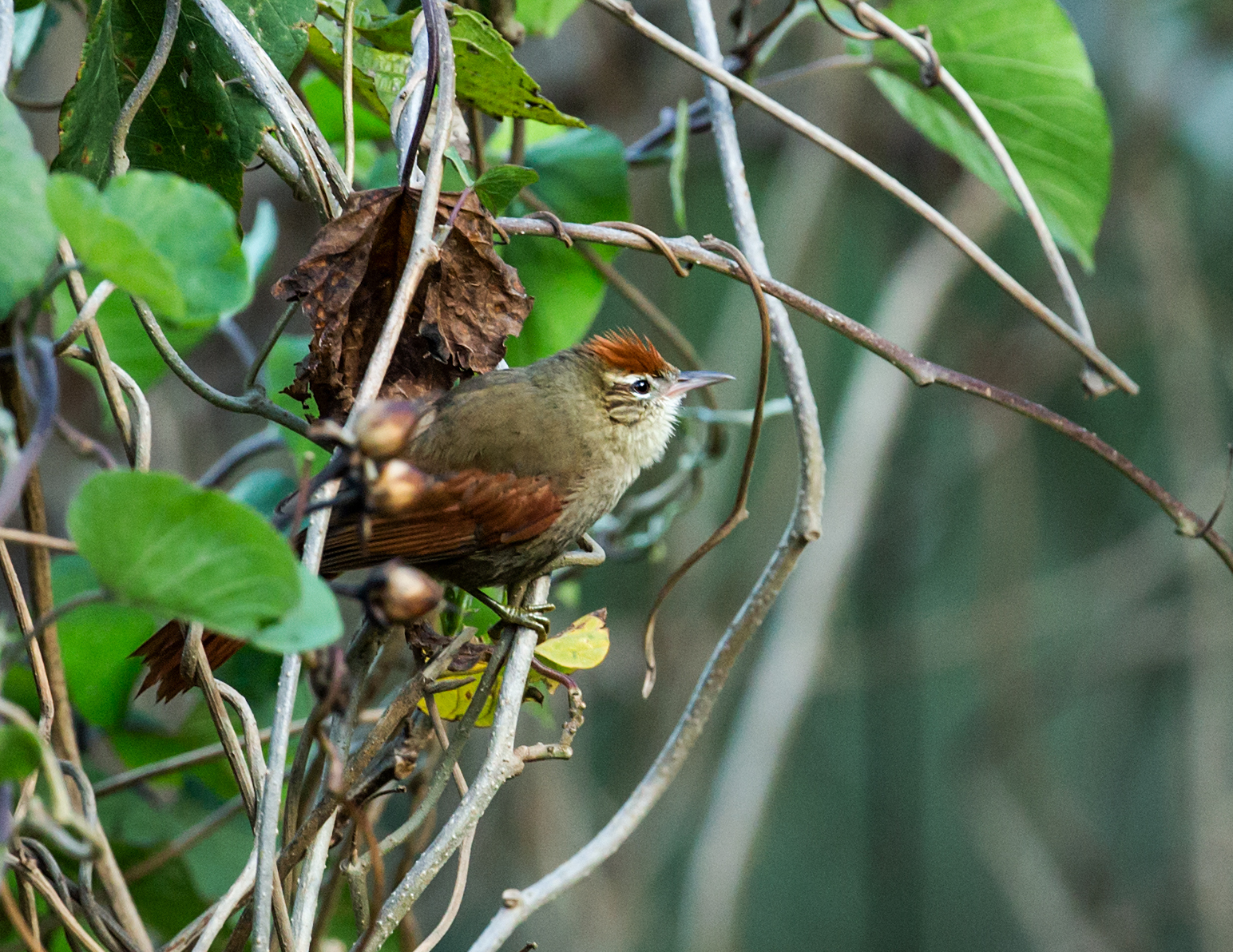
- Line-cheeked spinetail, Cranioleuca antisiensis Song of Line-cheeked spinetail

Conservation status
- Least Concern (IUCN 3.1)

Scientific classification
- Kingdom: Animalia
- Phylum: Chordata
- Class: Aves
- Order: Passeriformes
- Family: Furnariidae
- Genus: Cranioleuca
- Species: C. antisiensis

Binomial name
- Cranioleuca antisiensis (Sclater, PL, 1859)

Synonyms
- Synallaxis antisiensis (protonym)

= Line-cheeked spinetail =

Species of bird

The line-cheeked spinetail (Cranioleuca antisiensis) is an arboreal species of bird in the ovenbird family Furnariidae. It is a common species in the Andes in Ecuador and Peru. Its natural habitat is subtropical or tropical moist montane forests, woodland and scrub. It is distinguished from other species by its distribution, behaviour and white supercilium. There are two recognized subspecies, which are in reality a gradient in morphology and plumage from one extreme to the other.

The IUCN Red List conservation status is rated as Least Concern, as the line-cheeked spinetail is common along its range and is presumably stable. However, since it is arboreal, the line-cheeked spinetail is vulnerable to deforestation. Yet, it is relatively tolerant to human disturbance and does well in successional vegetation.

== Taxonomy ==
The line-cheeked spinetail was formally described in 1859 by the English zoologist Philip Sclater from a specimen collected near the town of Cuenca in Ecuador. Sclater coined the binomial name Synallaxis antisiensis. The species is now placed in the genus Cranioleuca was introduced in 1853 by the German naturalist Ludwig Reichenbach.

Five subspecies are recognised:

- Cranioleuca antisiensis antisiensis (Sclater, PL, 1859) – southwest Ecuador
- Cranioleuca antisiensis palamblae (Chapman, 1923) – northwest Peru
- Cranioleuca antisiensis baroni (Salvin, 1895) – north Andes of Peru
- Cranioleuca antisiensis capitalis Zimmer, JT, 1924 – Huánuco (central Peru)
- Cranioleuca antisiensis zaratensis Koepcke, 1961 – Pasco and Lima (south-central, southwest Peru)

There are three subspecies of line-cheeked spinetails: Cranioleuca antisiensis antisiensis in the north and Cranioleuca antisiensis palamblae in the south. They are defined by the differences in plumage and size between the extremes. In general, C. a. antisiensis occurs in Ecuador and C. a. palamblae in Peru. Where the two subspecies meet, there is little phenotypic distinction. The Baron's spinetail (C. a. baroni), named after Oscar Theodor Baron, with a distribution south of the line-cheeked spinetail, is nearly identical to C. a. palambae where their ranges meet, and has been reclassified as a subspecies in 2018. Without justifiable boundaries, it has been argued that the two species should be treated as one within the line-cheeked spinetail species complex. In addition, they from a larger superspecies with the closely related ash-browed spinetail (C. curtata) and the red-faced spinetail (C. erythrops).

The majority of species within the genus Cranioleuca diverged relatively recently in a rapid speciation event beginning approximately 3.5 Ma. It is unclear what drove the divergence, as there is little difference in morphology or behaviour between species. One hypothesis is that a rapid change in plumage, in conjunction with some other traits, may have caused reproductive isolation and speciation. There is evidence that climatic niches have been a driver of speciation within the genus, particularly within the line-cheeked spinetail species complex. Its distribution spans an elevation gradient, as well as different climates, which is reflected in gradual phenotypic differences. Body mass increases from north to south, in accordance with Bergmann's rule. This in turn has an effect on the vocalizations along the range.

== Description ==
The line-cheeked spinetail is a mid-sized spinetail, weighing 15–18 g and reaching 14.5 cm long. Like other spinetails in the genus Cranioleuca, it has a long graduated tail and a relatively long bill that curves downward slightly. It has a rufous crown; with a well-defined white supercilium; a pale throat; and some streaking on its ear coverts. It is brown to olive-grey above; with a greyish brown breast and belly; and rufous tail and wings.

The line-cheeked spinetail is a diurnal species and vocalizes most actively at dawn and dusk to maintain their breeding territory boundaries. It is often seen singing alone in branches near the top of trees. Its calls are a variation of chippering and scolding, including a "tsi-chik". The song is a series of loud shrills, usually ending in a trill before fading. Both adults and juveniles respond strongly to playback of songs, suggesting aggression between individuals within the species.

Although the distribution of the line-cheeked spinetail does not overlap with other Cranioleuca, it may be found in the same areas as the ash-browed spinetail (C. curtata) in montane valleys. However, the ash-browed spinetail has a less visible grey supercilium and tends to forage higher up in the canopy. The line-cheeked spinetail may also be confused with the red-faced spinetail (C. erythrops), especially the juveniles, which have a buff supercilium. The adult red-faced spinetail does not have a supercilium and occurs more on the east slopes of the Andes, whereas line-cheeked spinetails occupy the west slopes.

== Distribution and habitat ==
The line-cheeked spinetail occupies a clinal distribution along the western slope of the Andes in south-west Ecuador and western Peru. A published observation of a breeding pair in Mashpi Protected Forest suggests that their distribution may extend further north in Ecuador than previously thought. However, more observations would be needed to confirm this. The tree-line along the western slope of the Andes occurs around 3000m, which is also the highest elevation that line-cheeked spinetails occur. In Ecuador, line-cheeked spinetails can occupy elevations as low as 800m, whereas it is limited to 2000m is the more arid regions of its Peru range.

Its habitat ranges from semi-humid to humid montane scrub forest and forest edges. However, it prefers habitat less humid than "cloud forests". Line-cheeked spinetails occur primarily where there is dense evergreen vegetation, and are not found in deciduous and arid habitats.

== Behaviour ==
Line-cheeked spinetails defend relatively small territories as a family group. These groups often consist of 2–4 adults and 1–2 juveniles. They are also sometimes seen in mixed flocks.

=== Breeding ===
Little is known about the courtship of line-cheeked spinetails; however, they are assumed to be socially monogamous. Nests are formed around February and March, and two eggs are laid. Nests are usually large and oval shaped, built at the ends of branches. A nest in north-west Ecuador was described as a domed structure built on the underside of a palm leaf. The exterior was constructed out of moss, cucurbitaceous vine and covered in the hairy seeds of a Bombacaceae, while the interior was built with palm fibres, Lauraceae leaves and lines with epiphyte rootlets. Incubation and parental care have not been described, although fledglings are observed by August.

=== Diet ===
As with other species within the family Furnariidae, line-cheeked spinetails are insectivores, although their exact diet has not yet been studied. They glean primarily near the ground and within shrubs. However, their status as an understory bird is questioned, as they will often move up in the canopy to forage.
