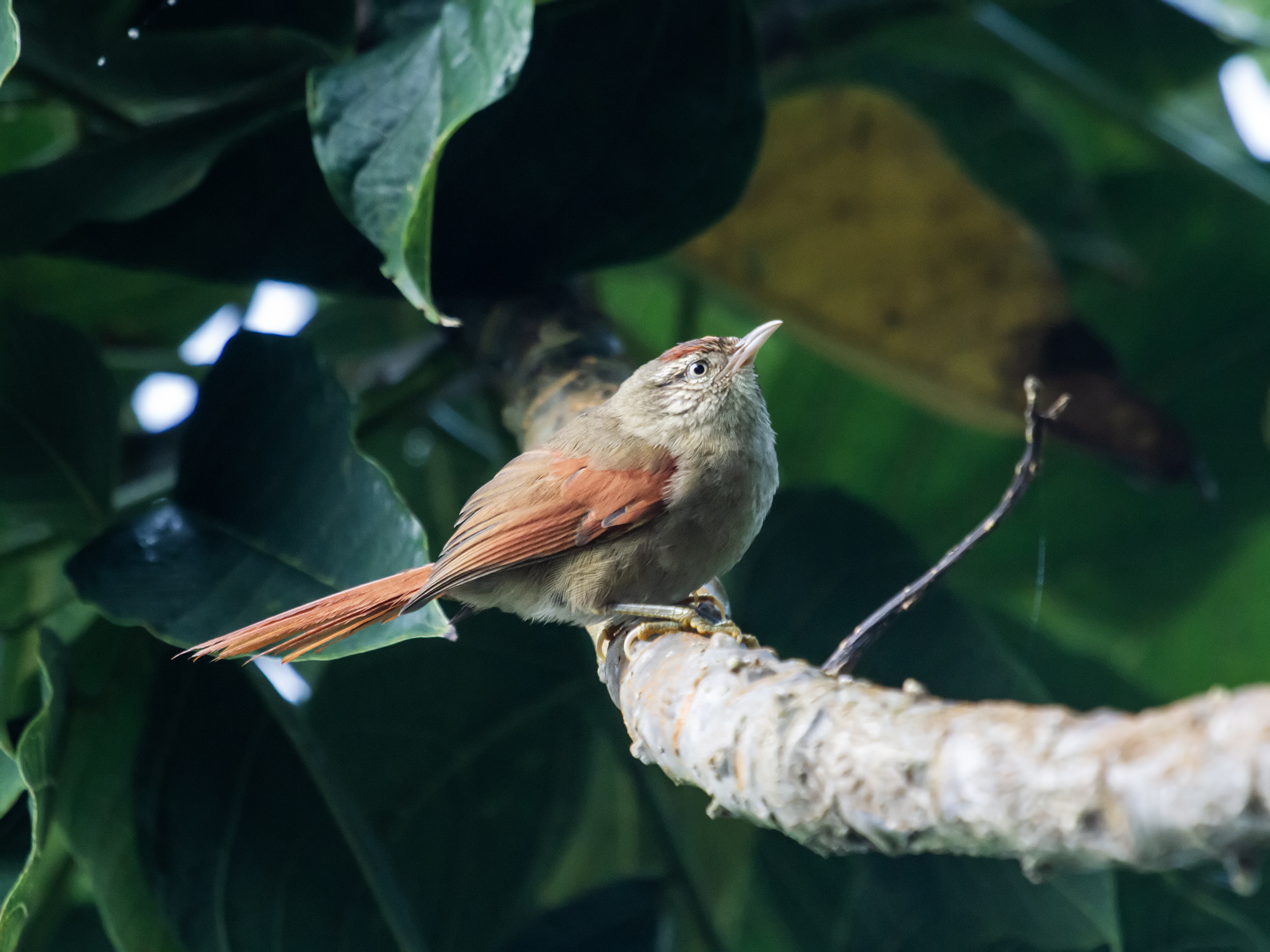
- Streak-capped spinetail (Cranioleuca albiceps)

Scientific classification
- Kingdom: Animalia
- Phylum: Chordata
- Class: Aves
- Order: Passeriformes
- Family: Furnariidae
- Genus: Cranioleuca; Reichenbach, 1853

Type species
- Synallaxis albiceps d'Orbigny & Lafresnaye, 1837

= Cranioleuca =

Genus of birds

The typical spinetails, Cranioleuca, are a genus of Neotropical birds in the ovenbird family Furnariidae.

This is a homogeneous group of small birds that live in forested habitats. The spinetails in this genus differ from those placed in Synallaxis in having shorter tails and being more arboreal. They are less vocal and more frequently join mixed flocks.

== Taxonomy and species list ==
The genus Cranioleuca was introduced in 1853 by the German naturalist Ludwig Reichenbach with the light-crowned spinetail as the type species. The name combines the Ancient Greek kranion meaning "skull" with leukos meaning "white".

The genus contains 20 species:

| Image | Scientific name | Common name | Distribution |
|---|---|---|---|
| | Cranioleuca berlepschi | Russet-mantled softtail | northern Peru |
| | Cranioleuca weskei | Vilcabamba spinetail | southern Peru |
| | Cranioleuca marcapatae | Marcapata spinetail | southern Peru |
| | Cranioleuca albiceps | Light-crowned spinetail | southeastern Peru and Bolivia |
| | Cranioleuca vulpina | Rusty-backed spinetail | Colombia, Venezuela, riverine Amazonia and Brazil |
| | Cranioleuca dissita | Coiba spinetail | Coiba Island |
| | Cranioleuca vulpecula | Parker's spinetail | riverine Amazonia |
| | Cranioleuca subcristata | Crested spinetail | northern Colombia and Venezuela |
| | Cranioleuca pyrrhophia | Stripe-crowned spinetail | southern Bolivia, Paraguay, Argentina and Uruguay |
| | Cranioleuca henricae | Bolivian spinetail | western Bolivia |
| | Cranioleuca obsoleta | Olive spinetail | South Region, eastern Paraguay and selva misionera |
| | Cranioleuca pallida | Pallid spinetail | eastern Brazil |
| | Cranioleuca semicinerea | Grey-headed spinetail | northeastern Brazil |
| | Cranioleuca albicapilla | Creamy-crested spinetail | southern Peru |
| | Cranioleuca erythrops | Red-faced spinetail | Talamancan montane forests and Andes of Colombia and Ecuador |
| | Cranioleuca demissa | Tepui spinetail | tepuis |
| | Cranioleuca hellmayri | Streak-capped spinetail | sierra Nevada de Santa Marta |
| | Cranioleuca curtata | Ash-browed spinetail | northern Andes |
| | Cranioleuca antisiensis | Line-cheeked spinetail | southern Ecuador and Peru |
| | Cranioleuca muelleri | Scaled spinetail | lower Amazon river |
