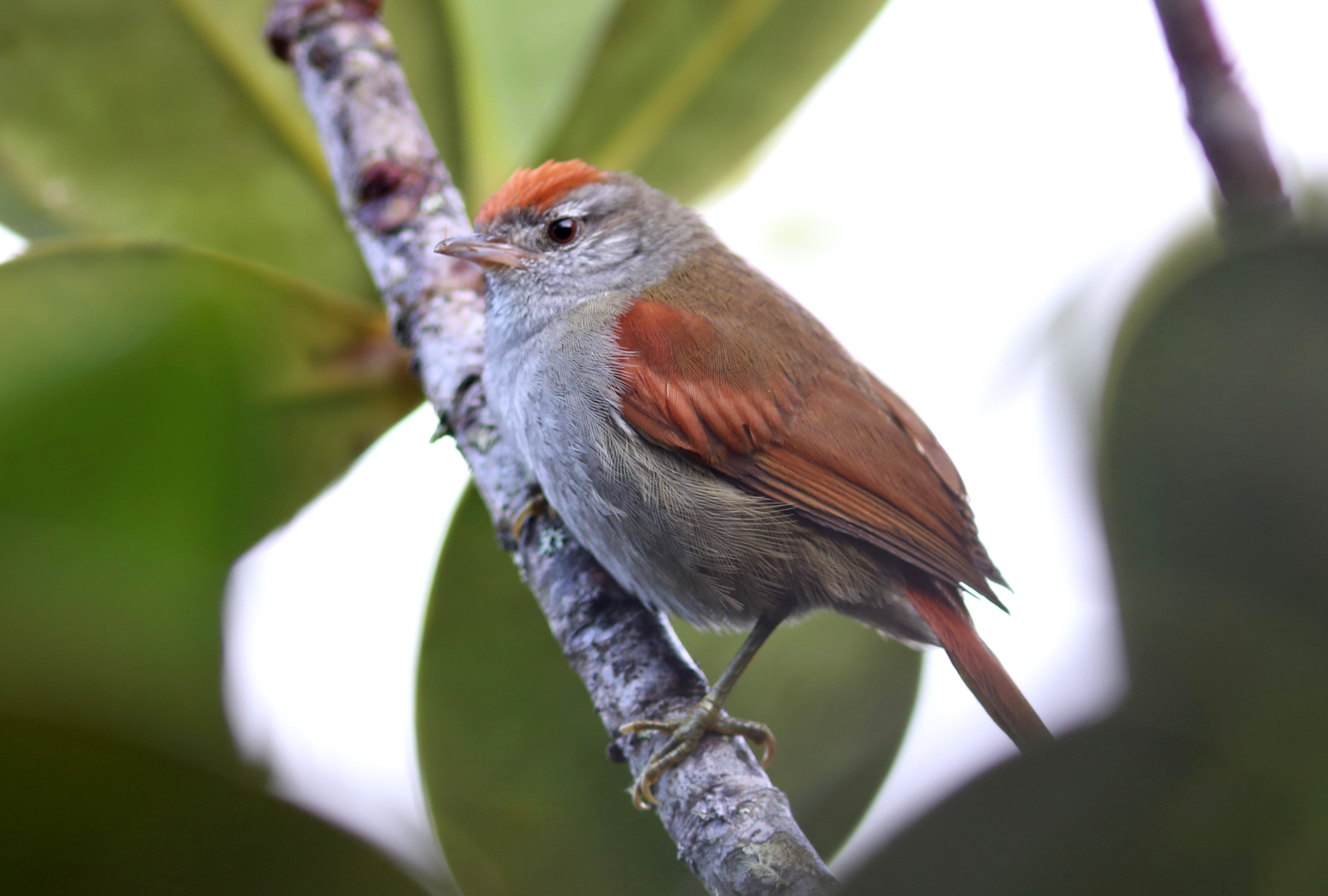

Conservation status
- Least Concern (IUCN 3.1)

Scientific classification
- Kingdom: Animalia
- Phylum: Chordata
- Class: Aves
- Order: Passeriformes
- Family: Furnariidae
- Genus: Cranioleuca
- Species: C. demissa

Binomial name
- Cranioleuca demissa (Salvin & Godman, 1884)

= Tepui spinetail =

Species of bird

The tepui spinetail (Cranioleuca demissa) is a species of bird in the Furnariinae subfamily of the ovenbird family Furnariidae. It is found in Brazil, Guyana, and Venezuela.

== Taxonomy and systematics ==
The tepui spinetail's taxonomy is unsettled. The International Ornithological Committee (IOC) and BirdLife International's Handbook of the Birds of the World (HBW) assign it two subspecies. The nominate is C. d. demissa (Salvin & Godman, 1884). The other has two subspecific epithets, C. d. cardonai (IOC) and C. d. cardonaorum (HBW) (both Phelps, WH Jr & Dickerman, 1980). The Clements taxonomy does not recognize C. d. cardonai/cardonaorum, treating the species as monotypic.

This article follows the two-subspecies model and uses the IOC spelling of the subspecific epithet.

== Description ==
The tepui spinetail is 14 to 15 cm (5.5 to 5.9 in) long and weighs 14 to 17 g (0.49 to 0.60 oz). The sexes have the same plumage. Adults of the nominate subspecies have a whitish supercilium on an otherwise dull brownish face with a few pale streaks. Their forehead is brown with some rufous touches, their crown reddish chestnut, and their back rich brown that becomes more rufescent by the uppertail coverts. Their wings are reddish chestnut and their flight feathers are slightly paler with dark fuscous tips. Their tail is dark reddish chestnut; it is graduated and sometimes the feathers lack barbs on the ends giving a spiny appearance. Their chin and throat are whitish and the rest of their underparts gray with slightly browner flanks. Their iris is chestnut, their maxilla dusky brown to black, their mandible pinkish horn with a dark tip, and their legs and feet olive-yellow to olive-brown. Juveniles have a brown crown and a more olivaceous back and more ochraceous underparts than adults. Subspecies C. d. cardonai has a more olivaceous supercilium and face than the nominate, and olivaceous brown rather than gray underparts.

== Distribution and habitat ==
The nominate subspecies of the tepui spinetail is found on the namesake tepuis where southeastern Venezuela, west central Guyana, and the northern Brazilian state of Roraima meet. Subspecies C. d. cardonai is found on tepuis in southern Venezuela. The species inhabits montane evergreen forest and woodlands, mostly between elevations of 1,100 and 2,450 m (3,600 and 8,000 ft). It also occurs locally in gallery forest in the Gran Sabana in the Venezuelan state of Bolívar.

== Behavior ==
=== Movement ===
The tepui spinetail is a year-round resident throughout its range.

=== Feeding ===
The tepui spinetail feeds mostly on arthropods. It forages singly or in pairs and usually as part of a mixed-species feeding flock. It feeds from the forest's middle levels to its canopy. It acrobatically gleans prey from bark and debris while hitching along small branches.

=== Breeding ===
The tepui spinetail's nest is a globe of moss suspended from a branch. Nothing else is known about its breeding biology.

=== Vocalization ===
The tepui spinetail's song is "a thin, descending, accelerating series, 'téé-téé-te-ti ti'ti'ti'ti'ti'i'i'i' " and its alarm call a "high, short, dry rattle".

== Status ==
The IUCN has assessed the tepui spinetail as being of Least Concern. Its population size is unknown but believed to be stable. No immediate threats have been identified. It is considered "fairly common within its limited range".
