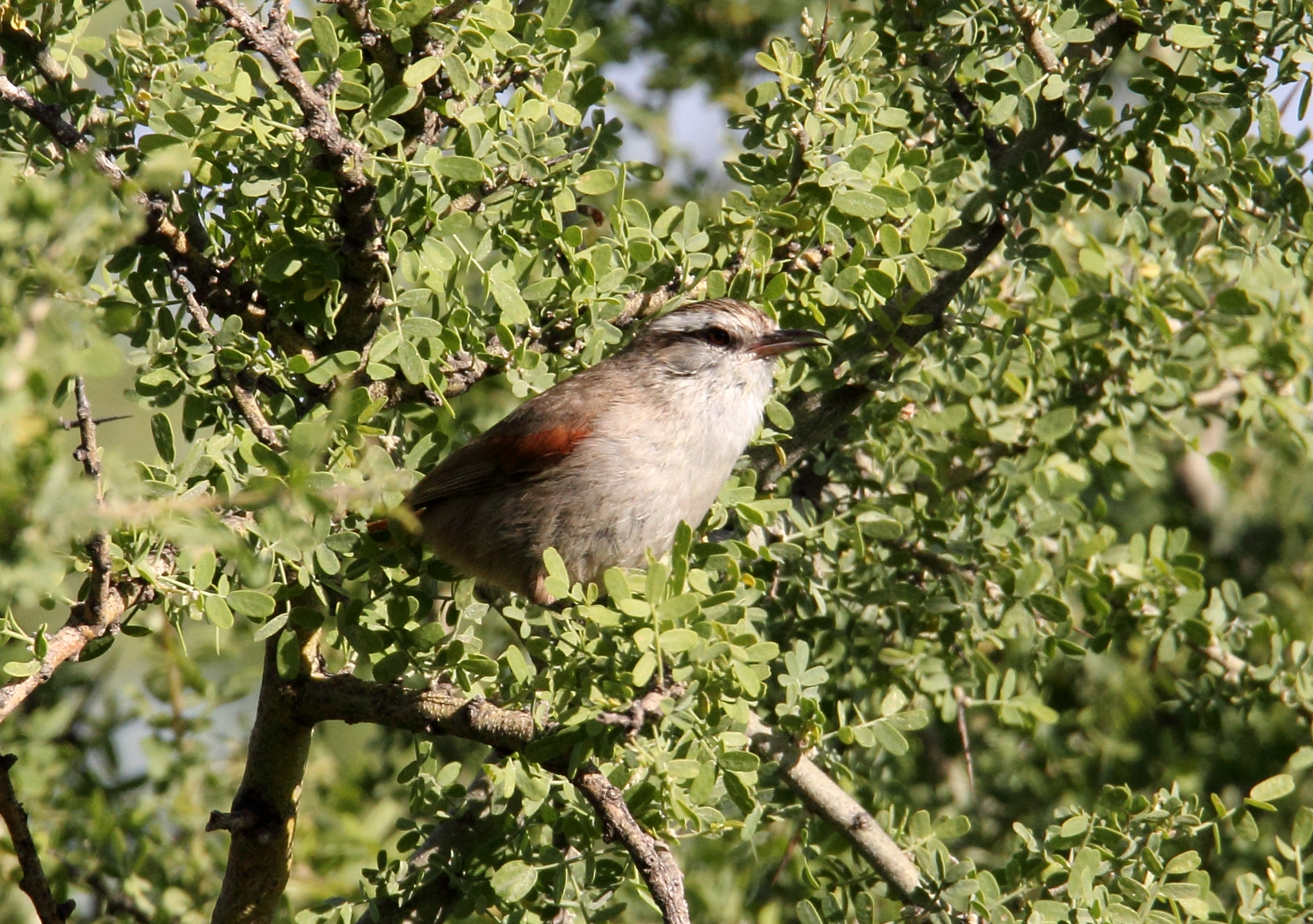

Conservation status
- Least Concern (IUCN 3.1)

Scientific classification
- Kingdom: Animalia
- Phylum: Chordata
- Class: Aves
- Order: Passeriformes
- Family: Furnariidae
- Genus: Cranioleuca
- Species: C. pyrrhophia

Binomial name
- Cranioleuca pyrrhophia (Vieillot, 1818)

= Stripe-crowned spinetail =

Species of bird

The stripe-crowned spinetail (Cranioleuca pyrrhophia) is a species of bird in the Furnariinae subfamily of the ovenbird family Furnariidae. It is found in Argentina, Bolivia, Brazil, Paraguay, and Uruguay.

== Taxonomy and systematics ==
The stripe-crowned spinetail has three subspecies, the nominate C. p. pyrrhophia (Vieillot, 1818), C. p. rufipennis (Sclater, PL & Salvin, 1879), and C. p. striaticeps (d'Orbigny & Lafresnaye, 1837).

Genetic data published in 2011 found that the stripe-crowned spinetail and the pallid spinetails (C. pallida) are sister species, and that the two are closely related to the olive spinetail (C. obsoleta). Some earlier work supported treating the stripe-crowned, olive, and Bolivian spinetail (C. henricae) as a superspecies. The stripe-crowned and olive spinetails hybridize in southern Brazil and there have been suggestions that they are conspecific.

== Description ==
The stripe-crowned spinetail is 13 to 16 cm (5.1 to 6.3 in) long and weighs 10 to 16 g (0.35 to 0.56 oz). It is a smallish member of genus Cranioleuca and has unique crown and tail patterns. The species shows considerable plumage variation following Gloger's rule. The sexes have the same plumage. Adults of the nominate subspecies have a wide white supercilium, dark brown lores, dark brown behind the eye, and mixed whitish and brown ear coverts. Their crown is dramatically striped with blackish and buffy brown; the stripes are fainter in southern Brazil and Paraguay. Their hindcrown and back are grayish brown that is browner in southern Bolivia. Their rump and uppertail coverts are browner than the back. Their tail feathers are graduated and very pointed, giving a forked appearance. The central pair of feathers are dark brown or rufous with dark brown inner webs, the next two pairs rufous with dark brown along the shafts and on the tip, and the outer pair rufous. Their wing coverts are rufous, their primary coverts dark brown, and their flight feathers dull brownish. Their throat is whitish, their breast brownish gray or buffish gray, and their belly a darker gray. The breast and belly are paler in southern Bolivia. Their iris is dark red to pale orange to dark brown, their maxilla black to gray, their mandible pinkish horn to pinkish with a dark tip, and their legs and feet olive-green to greenish gray or yellowish brown. Juveniles have an unstriped crown and darker underparts than adults; their underparts are faintly mottled or scaled.

Subspecies C. p. striaticeps has more streaking on the crown than the nominate, a slightly browner back, deeper rufous uppertail coverts and central tail feathers, a paler and less gray breast and belly, and a rufescent tinge on the undertail coverts. C. p. rufipennis has crown stripes intermediate between the nominate and striaticeps, an even browner back than striaticeps, and more rufous on some of the flight feathers than the other two subspecies.

== Distribution and habitat ==
The nominate subspecies of the stripe-crowned spinetail is by far the most widespread, and the southernmost representative of genus Cranioleuca. It is found in lowland southern Bolivia, in western Paraguay, in northeastern and central Argentina as far south as Río Negro Province, in essentially all of Uruguay, and in Brazil's southernmost state of Rio Grande do Sul. C. p. rufipennis is found in the Andes of Bolivia's La Paz and Cochabamba departments. C. p. striaticeps is found in Bolivia's central and southern Andes, in the departments of Cochabamba, Santa Cruz, and Tarija.

The stripe-crowned spinetail inhabits a variety of landscapes including tropical deciduous forest, gallery forest, arid montane scrublands, dry savanna, semi-humid woodlands, and in the Andes Alnus and Podocarpus woodlands. In elevation it ranges from near sea level to 3,100 m (10,200 ft).

== Behavior ==
=== Movement ===
The stripe-crowned spinetail is a year-round resident throughout its range.

=== Feeding ===
The stripe-crowned spinetail feeds on arthropods. It typically forages singly or in pairs and often joins mixed-species feeding flocks. It acrobatically gleans prey from bark, lichens, mosses, and epiphytes as it hitches and climbs along small branches from the forest's understorey to its canopy.

=== Breeding ===
The stripe-crowned spinetail breeds in the austral spring and summer. It is thought to be monogamous. Its nest is an oval ball made of sticks and other plant material, though in the eastern part of its range softer materials replace most of the sticks. Its entrance hole is on the side and the egg chamber is lined with soft plant fibers and feathers. The nest is typically in the crotch of a small tree or bush, about 2 to 5 m (5 to 15 ft) above the ground. The clutch size is two to three eggs. Fledging occurs 13 to 15 days after hatch. The incubation period and details of parental care are not known.

=== Vocalization ===
One song of the stripe-crowned spinetail is "an accelerating, descending trill without introductory notes" also described as "an accelerating tee teetee titititit... ending in a trill. Another is a "few widely spaced metallic 'tick' notes followed by rapid series of high, descending, bubbly, clicking 'chack' notes". Its calls include a "soft, metallic 'tck' or rapid 'tidrrit' " and "wrrru".

== Status ==
The IUCN has assessed the stripe-crowned spinetail as being of Least Concern. It has a very large range and an unknown population size that is believed to be stable. No immediate threats have been identified. It is considered fairly common to common across most of its range though uncommon in Paraguay. It is "[t]olerant of habitat disturbance; often present in areas with only small patches of habitat remaining, including mere thickets and hedgerows in agricultural regions." However, subspecies C. p. rufipennis "has not been definitely recorded for at least 50 years, and may be endangered".
