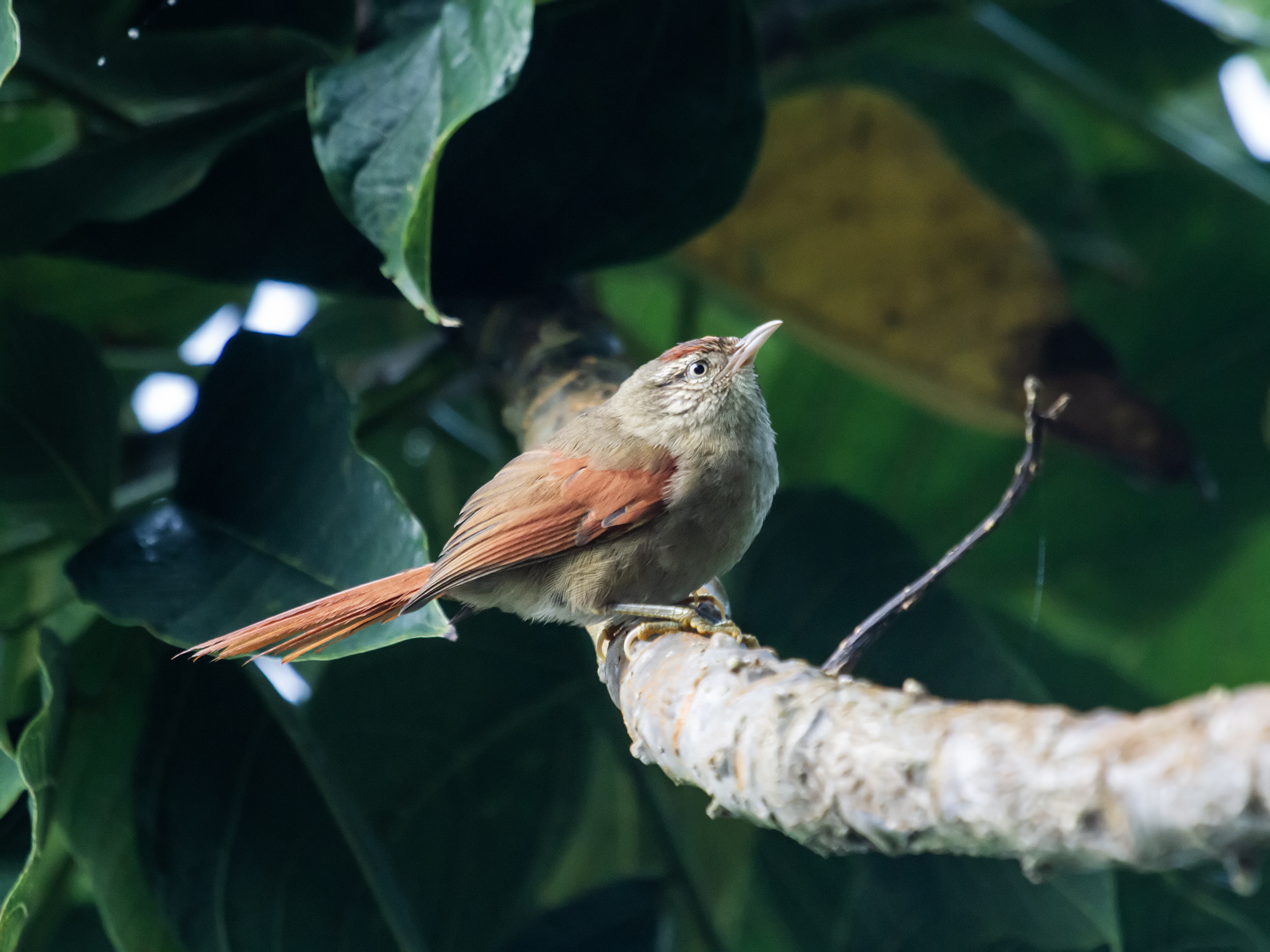

Conservation status
- Least Concern (IUCN 3.1)

Scientific classification
- Kingdom: Animalia
- Phylum: Chordata
- Class: Aves
- Order: Passeriformes
- Family: Furnariidae
- Genus: Cranioleuca
- Species: C. hellmayri

Binomial name
- Cranioleuca hellmayri (Bangs, 1907)

= Streak-capped spinetail =

Species of bird

The streak-capped spinetail (Cranioleuca hellmayri) is a species of bird in the Furnariinae subfamily of the ovenbird family Furnariidae. It is found in Colombia and Venezuela.

== Taxonomy and systematics ==
The streak-capped spinetail is monotypic.

== Description ==
The streak-capped spinetail is 14 to 15 cm (5.5 to 5.9 in) long and weighs 14 to 16 g (0.49 to 0.56 oz). The sexes have the same plumage. Adults have a narrow whitish supercilium on an otherwise dark brownish and buff face. Their crown is reddish chestnut with blackish streaks, their back brown that becomes paler by the rump, and tawny rufescent uppertail coverts. Their wings are mostly reddish chestnut; their flight feathers have slightly duller edges and dark fuscous tips. Their tail is reddish chestnut; it is graduated and the feathers have pointed tips. Their chin and throat are whitish, their breast and belly pale brownish gray or grayish olive, and their flanks and undertail coverts a slightly deeper brown. Their iris is pale yellow to whitish, their maxilla blackish to gray, their mandible pinkish horn to pinkish, and their legs and feet yellowish green to pinkish.

== Distribution and habitat ==
The streak-capped spinetail is found almost exclusively in the isolated Sierra Nevada de Santa Marta of northern Colombia. A single specimen was collected in the Venezuelan part of the Serranía del Perijá. The species inhabits montane evergreen forest, both primary and secondary. In Colombia it is found at elevations between 1,200 and 3,000 m (3,900 and 9,800 ft); the Venezuelan specimen was collected at 700 m (2,300 ft).

== Behavior ==
=== Movement ===
In Colombia the streak-capped spinetail is a year-round resident. The species' movements, if any, in Venezuela are not known.

=== Feeding ===
The streak-capped spinetail feeds on arthropods. It forages in pairs and usually as part of a mixed-species feeding flock. It usually feeds from the forest's middle levels to its subcanopy but sometimes lower. It acrobatically gleans prey from bark, epiphytes, and debris while hitching along small branches.

=== Breeding ===
The streak-capped spinetail's breeding season has not been fully defined but eggs have been noted between September and November. It is thought to be monogamous. Its nest is a ball of grass and leaves hung from a branch. Nothing else is known about its breeding biology.

=== Vocalization ===
The streak-capped spinetail's vocalizations have not been fully determined. What is either its song or call is described as "a weak, high-pitched, squeaky trill, 'ti, ti, t, t-t-t-t' " and a "shrill, squeaky trill, accelerating".

== Status ==
The IUCN has assessed the streak-capped spinetail as being of Least Concern. It has a limited range and an unknown population size that is believed to be decreasing. No immediate threats have been identified. It is considered common in its small Colombian range; its status in Venezuela is not known.
