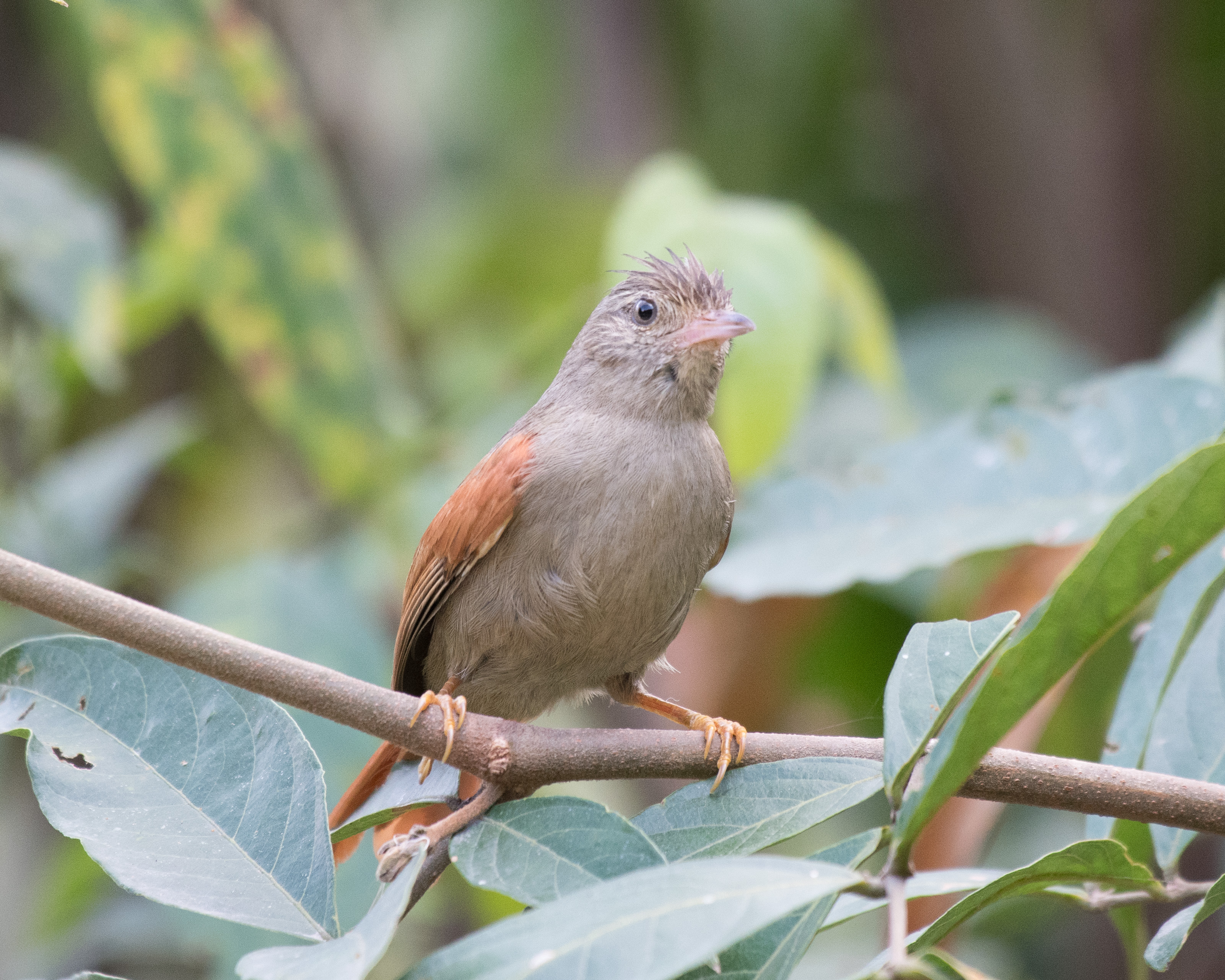

Conservation status
- Least Concern (IUCN 3.1)

Scientific classification
- Kingdom: Animalia
- Phylum: Chordata
- Class: Aves
- Order: Passeriformes
- Family: Furnariidae
- Genus: Cranioleuca
- Species: C. subcristata

Binomial name
- Cranioleuca subcristata (Sclater, PL, 1874)

= Crested spinetail =

Species of bird

The crested spinetail (Cranioleuca subcristata) is a species of bird in the Furnariinae subfamily of the ovenbird family Furnariidae. It is found in Colombia and Venezuela.

== Taxonomy and systematics ==
The crested spinetail has two subspecies, the nominate C. s. subcristata (Sclater, PL, 1874) and C. s. fuscivertex (Phelps, WH & Phelps, WH Jr, 1955).

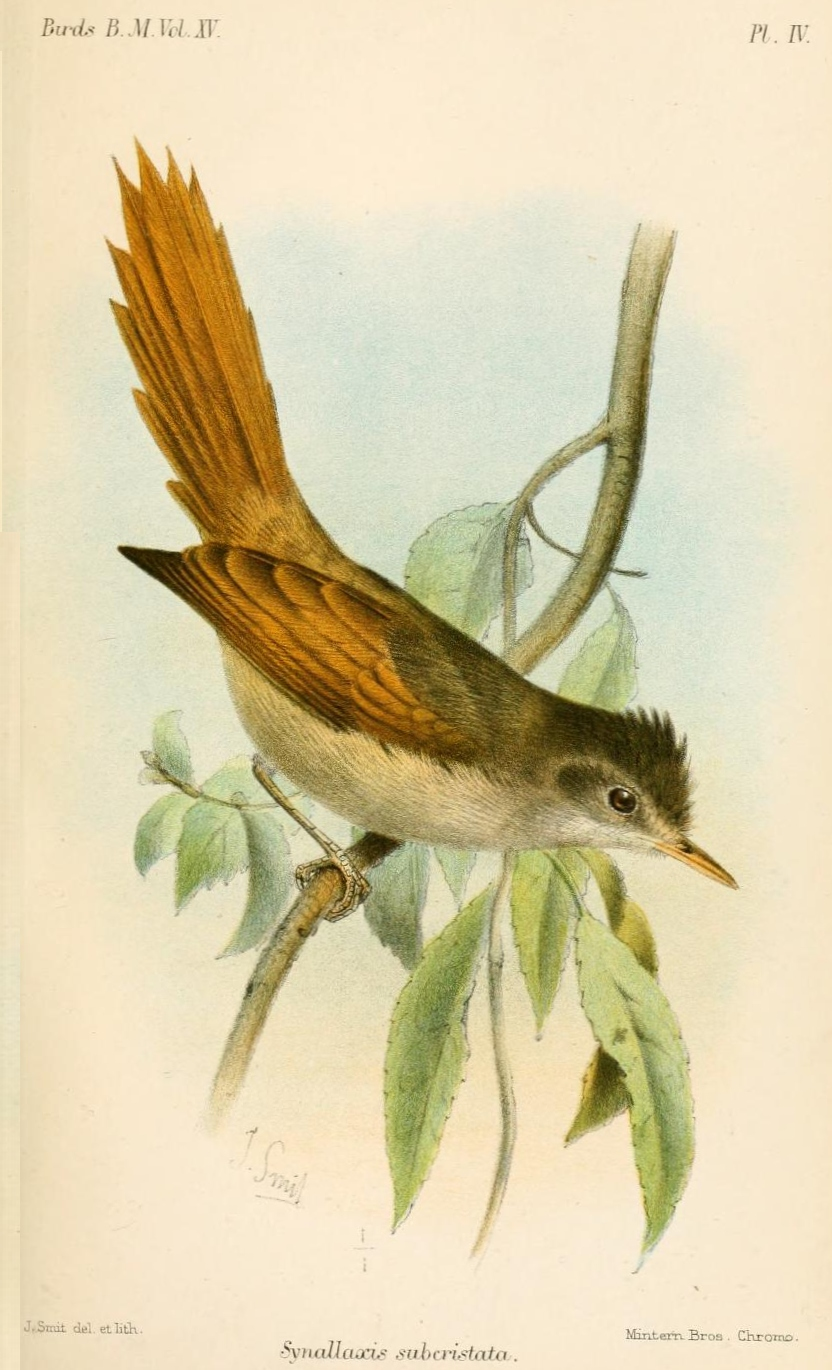
Cranioleuca subcristata

== Description ==
The crested spinetail is 14 to 15 cm (5.5 to 5.9 in) long and weighs about 14 g (0.49 oz). It is a long-billed member of genus Cranioleuca but despite its name has only a very slight crest. The sexes have the same plumage. Adults of the nominate subspecies have a faint whitish brown supercilium on an otherwise dull brownish face. Their crown is indistinctly striped with light and dark brown, and their back, rump, and uppertail coverts are brown. Their tail and wings are dark rufous with dark fuscous tips on the flight feathers. Their chin is whitish buff and their throat and underparts dull tawny-brownish. Their iris is chestnut to cream, their maxilla brownish pink, their mandible yellowish to pinkish, and their legs and feet yellowish pink to greenish yellow. Juveniles are grayer than adults and have more mottled underparts and a rufescent tinge to the sides of the crown. Subspecies C. s. fuscivertex has blacker and more prominent stripes on the crown than the nominate.

== Distribution and habitat ==
The nominate subspecies of the crested spinetail is the more widely distributed of the two. It is found in much of northwestern Venezuela and adjacent northeastern Colombia, and separately in northeastern Venezuela. Subspecies C. s. fuscivertex is found in the Serranía del Perijá that straddles the Colombia-Venezuela border. The species primarily inhabits montane evergreen forest. In Venezuela's Maracaibo Basin it locally occurs in lowland tropical evergreen forest. It also occurs in mature secondary forest and plantations. In elevation it ranges between 50 and 1,950 m (160 and 6,400 ft) though in Colombia it is scarce in lowlands.

== Behavior ==
=== Movement ===
The crested spinetail is a year-round resident throughout its range.

=== Feeding ===
The crested spinetail feeds on arthropods. It typically forages singly or in pairs and often joins mixed-species feeding flocks. It acrobatically gleans prey from bark and debris as it hitches and climbs along small branches from the forest's mid-storey to its subcanopy.

=== Breeding ===
The crested spinetail breeds between January and June in northern Venezuela; its season elsewhere has not been defined. It is thought to be monogamous. Its nest is a globe made mostly of grass, with an entrance near the bottom, and suspended from the end of a branch. Nothing else is known about its breeding biology.

=== Vocalization ===
The crested spinetail's song is "3 high, shrill notes followed by chattery descending trill, 'pzeep, pzeep, pzeep, pee-pee-pe-e-e-e' " and its calls "a sharp 'tsink' [and a] low rattle".

== Status ==
The IUCN has assessed the crested spinetail as being of Least Concern. It has a large range and an unknown population size that is believed to be stable. No immediate threats have been identified. It is considered fairly common to common in much of its range but rare in the Colombian lowlands. It occurs in three Venezuelan national parks.
