= Grey-headed spinetail =

Conservation status
- Least Concern (IUCN 3.1)

Scientific classification
- Kingdom: Animalia
- Phylum: Chordata
- Class: Aves
- Order: Passeriformes
- Family: Furnariidae
- Genus: Cranioleuca
- Species: C. semicinerea

Binomial name
- Cranioleuca semicinerea (Reichenbach, 1853)

Species of bird

The grey-headed spinetail (Cranioleuca semicinerea) is a species of bird in the Furnariinae subfamily of the ovenbird family Furnariidae. It is endemic to Brazil.

== Taxonomy and systematics ==
The grey-headed spinetail's taxonomy is unsettled. The International Ornithological Committee and BirdLife International's Handbook of the Birds of the World treat it as monotypic. The Clements taxonomy assigns it two subspecies, the nominate C. s. semicinerea (Reichenbach, 1853) and C. s. goyana (Pinto, 1936).

This article follows the monotypic model.

== Description ==
The grey-headed spinetail is 14 to 16 cm (5.5 to 6.3 in) long and weighs 14 to 16 g (0.49 to 0.56 oz). The sexes have the same plumage, which in its range is unique. Adults have a faint whitish supercilium and a gray-brown line through the eye on an otherwise pale gray face. Their forehead is pale buffy gray and their crown and nape are slightly darker gray; the crown has a short crest. Their back, tail, and wings are rufous-brown. Their tail feathers are graduated and lack barbs at the end giving a spiny appearance. Their throat and belly are pale gray and their breast, flanks, and undertail coverts are darker gray. Their iris is amber to dark brown, their bill dusky pinkish with a dark tip, and their legs and feet olive to yellowish green or paler pink-brown.

== Distribution and habitat ==
The grey-headed spinetail is found in eastern Brazil from Ceará south to Goiás and slightly into Minas Gerais. It inhabits dryer deciduous and semi-deciduous forest and woodlands and the edges of more humid evergreen forest. In elevation it ranges between 500 and 850 m (1,600 and 2,800 ft).

== Behavior ==
=== Movement ===
The grey-headed spinetail is a year-round resident throughout its range.

=== Feeding ===
The grey-headed spinetail feeds on arthropods. It typically forages in pairs, usually as part of a mixed-species feeding flock. It acrobatically gleans prey from bark and debris as it hitches along small branches high in the forest's subcanopy and canopy.

=== Breeding ===
The grey-headed spinetail's nest is an oval ball of moss and rootlets with a side entrance, typically wrapped around a horizontal branch about 5 to 12 m (15 to 40 ft) above the ground. Both parents provision nestlings. Nothing else is known about the species' breeding biology.

=== Vocalization ===
The grey-headed spinetail's song is an "extr. high 'tsit-tsit-tsit-' then bouncing down as [a] rattle". Its call is a "high 'trwit' ".

== Status ==
The IUCN has assessed the grey-headed spinetail as being of Least Concern. It has a fairly large range; its population size is not known and is believed to be decreasing. No immediate threats have been identified. It is considered rare to uncommon. It occurs in two protected areas but is "[r]estricted to [a] relatively narrow band of forest intermediate between tropical evergreen forest of the coast and drier caatinga woodland of the interior; this area is heavily used for coffee-growing, timber and agriculture; only a fraction of the original habitat remains."
