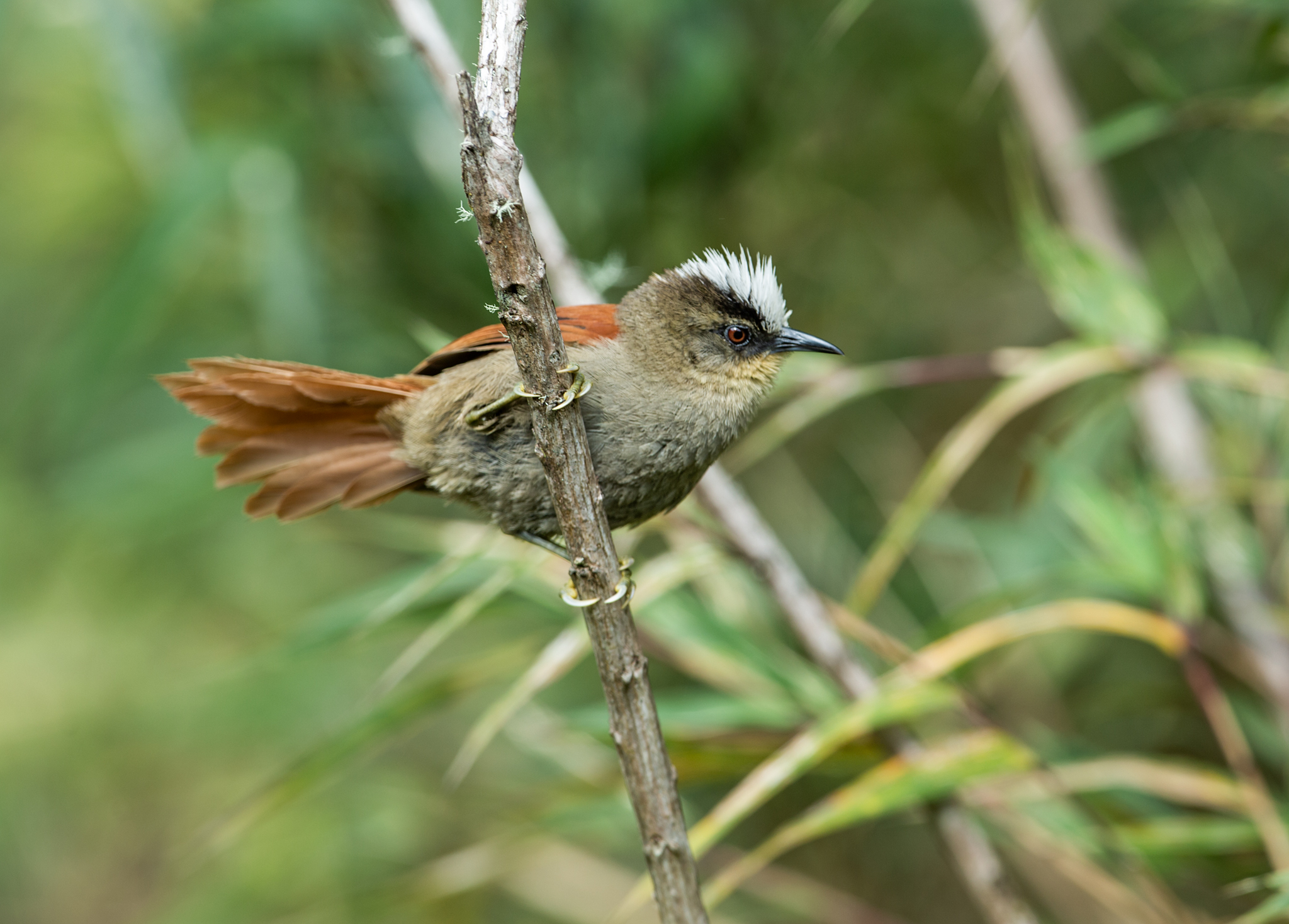

Conservation status
- Least Concern (IUCN 3.1)

Scientific classification
- Kingdom: Animalia
- Phylum: Chordata
- Class: Aves
- Order: Passeriformes
- Family: Furnariidae
- Genus: Cranioleuca
- Species: C. weskei

Binomial name
- Cranioleuca weskei Remsen, 1984

Synonyms
- Cranioleuca marcapatae weskei Remsen, 1984

= Vilcabamba spinetail =

Species of bird

The Vilcabamba spinetail (Cranioleuca weskei) is a species of passerine bird in the Furnariinae subfamily of the ovenbird family Furnariidae. It is endemic to Peru.

== Taxonomy and systematics ==
The Vicabamba spinetail's taxonomy is unsettled. It was originally described as a subspecies of the Marcapata spinetail (C. marcapatae). The Clements taxonomy retains that treatment. BirdLife International's Handbook of the Birds of the World split it as a separate species in 2016, the International Ornithological Committee in 2023, and the South American Classification Committee of the American Ornithological Society in 2025.

The Vilcabamba spinetail is monotypic.

== Description ==
The Vilcabamba spinetail is 14.5 to 16 cm (5.7 to 6.3 in) long and weighs about 20 g (0.71 oz). The sexes have the same plumage. Adults have a grayish face washed with buff. Their crown and a short crest are white with black on the sides. Their nape is grayish and their back, tail, and wings are rufous. Their throat is white and their breast and belly are grayish buff. Their iris is reddish brown, their maxilla grayish horn, their mandible silvery to blue-gray, and their legs and feet olive green.

== Distribution and habitat ==
The Vilcabamba spinetail is found in southeastern Peru, in the Vilcabamba Mountains of western Cuzco Department, in the Mantaro Valley of southeastern Junín Department, and in northern Ayacucho Department. It inhabits the understory of humid evergreen montane forest, where it favors areas with thickets of Chusquea bamboo. In elevation it ranges from 2,400 to 3,350 m (7,900 to 11,000 ft).

== Behavior ==
=== Movement ===
The Vilcabamba spinetail is a year-round resident throughout its range.

=== Feeding ===
The Vilcabamba spinetail feeds on arthropods but details are not known. It forages in pairs or in small groups thought to be families, usually as part of a mixed-species feeding flock. It gleans prey from moss, bromeliads, and bark while hitching along limbs. It forages mostly between about 2 and 10 m (7 and 30 ft) of the ground.

=== Breeding ===
The Vilcabamba spinetail's breeding season has not been defined; young of various ages of this species or the Marcapata spinetail have been recorded in February, April, May, August, and December. Nothing else is known about the species' breeding biology.

=== Vocalization ===
The Vilcabamba spinetail's song and call have not been put into words. Both xeno-canto and the Cornell Lab of Ornithology's Macaulay Library have recordings within their Marcapata spinetail collections.

== Status ==
The IUCN originally assessed the Vilcabamba spinetail as Near Threatened but since 2020 has rated it as being of Least Concern. It has a restricted range and an unknown population size that is believed to be decreasing. "The primary threat to this species is deforestation, as it is feared to be susceptible to forest fragmentation and edge effects."
