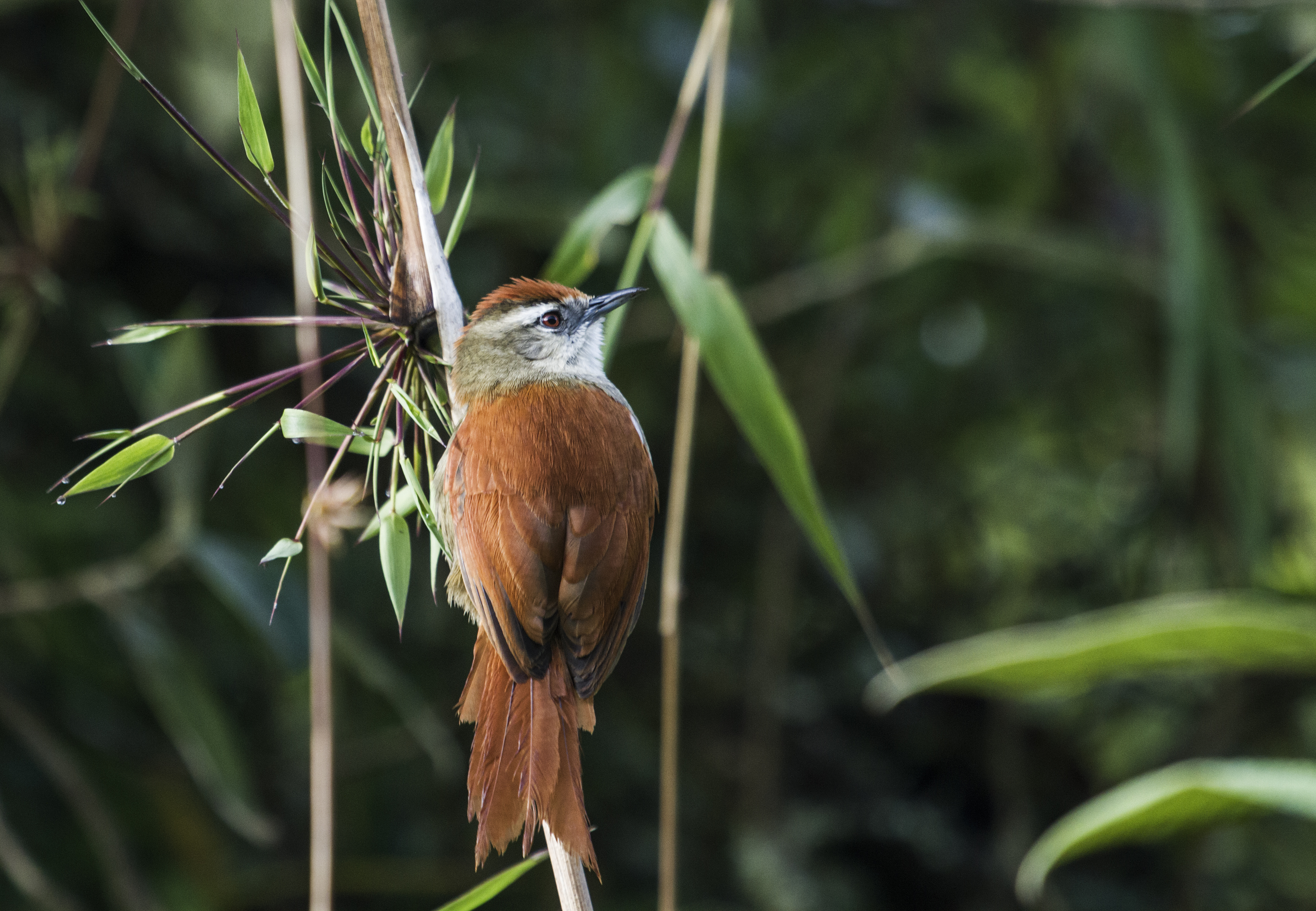

Conservation status
- Least Concern (IUCN 3.1)

Scientific classification
- Kingdom: Animalia
- Phylum: Chordata
- Class: Aves
- Order: Passeriformes
- Family: Furnariidae
- Genus: Cranioleuca
- Species: C. marcapatae

Binomial name
- Cranioleuca marcapatae Zimmer, JT, 1935

= Marcapata spinetail =

Species of bird

The Marcapata spinetail (Cranioleuca marcapatae) is a species of bird in the Furnariinae subfamily of the ovenbird family Furnariidae. It is endemic to Peru.

== Taxonomy and systematics ==
The Marcapata spinetail was first described in 1935 from a specimen probably collected in 1905. It was treated as monotypic until 1984 when what is now the Vilcabamba spinetail (C. weskei) was described as a subspecies of it. BirdLife International's Handbook of the Birds of the World split the Vilcabamba spinetail as a separate species in 2016 and the International Ornithological Committee followed suit in 2023. However, the South American Classification Committee of the American Ornithological Society and the Clements taxonomy retain the two-subspecies treatment of the Marcapata spinetail.

This article follows the monotypic species model.

== Description ==
The Marcapata spinetail is 14.5 to 16 cm (5.7 to 6.3 in) long. The sexes have the same plumage. Adults have a grayish face. Their crown and a short crest are reddish chestnut with black on the sides. Their nape is grayish and their back, tail, and wings are rufous. Their throat is white and their breast and belly are grayish buff. Their iris is reddish brown, their maxilla grayish horn, their mandible silvery to blue-gray, and their legs and feet olive green.

== Distribution and habitat ==
The Marcapata spinetail is found only in southeastern Peru's Department of Cuzco, from the upper Río Urubamba basin east to the valley of the Río Marcapata. It inhabits the understory of humid evergreen montane forest, where it favors areas with thickets of Chusquea bamboo. In elevation it ranges from 2,400 to 3,350 m (7,900 to 11,000 ft).

== Behavior ==
=== Movement ===
The Marcapata spinetail is a year-round resident throughout its range.

=== Feeding ===
The Marcapata spinetail feeds on arthropods but details are not known. It forages in pairs or in small groups thought to be families, usually as part of a mixed-species feeding flock. It gleans prey from moss, bromeliads, and bark while hitching along limbs. It forages mostly between about 2 and 10 m (7 and 30 ft) of the ground.

=== Breeding ===
The Marcapata spinetail's breeding season has not been defined; young of various ages of this species or the Vilcabamba spinetail have been recorded in February, April, May, August, and December. A nest "believed to be of this species" was an oval ball of moss, bark strips, and twigs hanging from a tree limb. Nothing else is known about the species' breeding biology.

=== Vocalization ===
The Marcapata spinetail's song is "a thin, descending, accelerating series of high, liquid notes: tew ti-ti-ti'ti'titititi" and its calls include "a high, liquid tew-tik and tewp".

== Status ==
The IUCN has assessed the Marcapata spinetail as being of Least Concern. It has a restricted range and an unknown population size though the latter is believed to be stable. "The only potential threat known to the Marcapata Spinetail is habitat loss, as the species is feared to be susceptible to forest fragmentation and edge effects. However, forests within the range remain largely unaffected by logging, fragmentation and human encroachment." It is considered "uncommon to fairly common".
