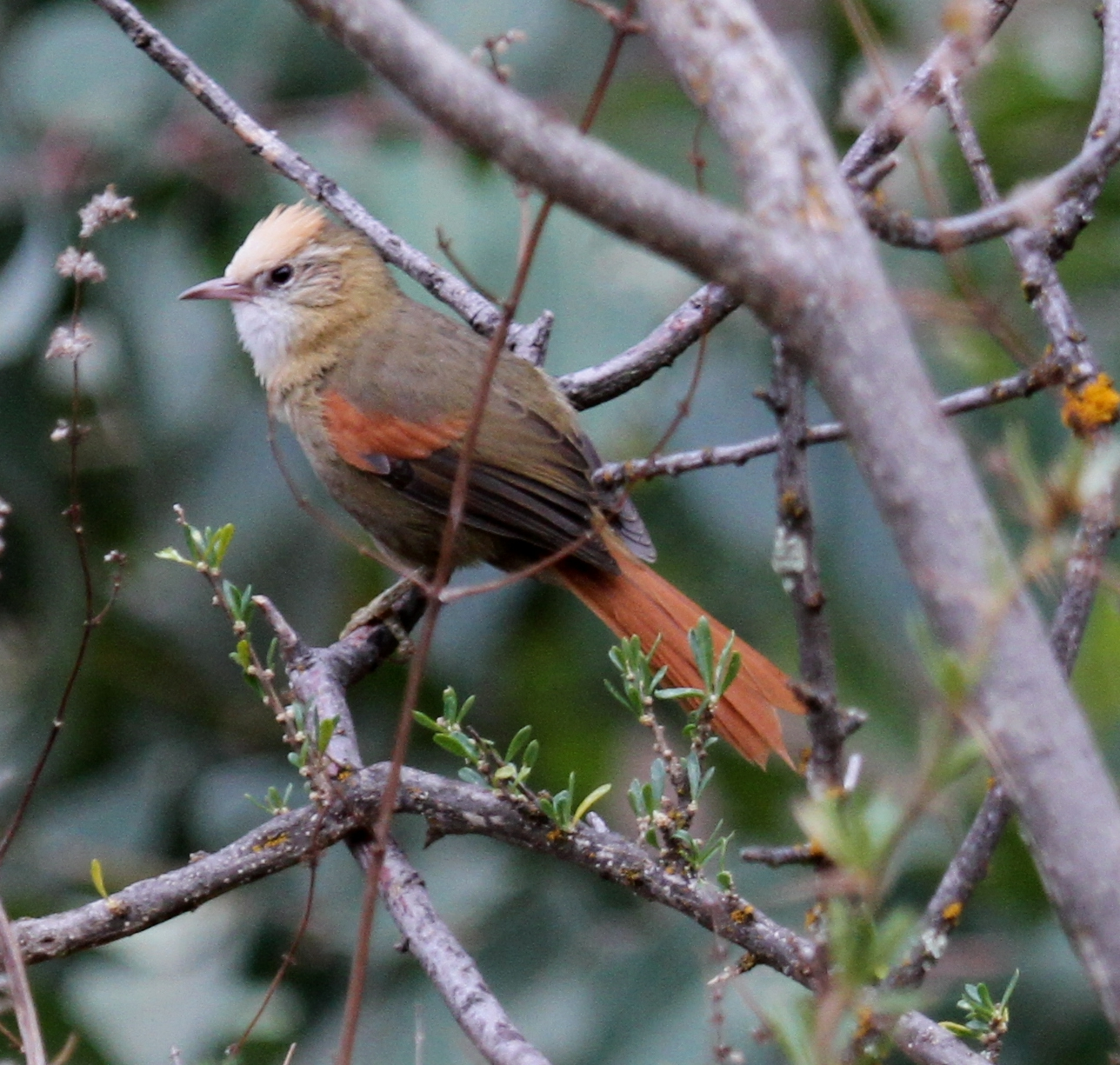

Conservation status
- Least Concern (IUCN 3.1)

Scientific classification
- Kingdom: Animalia
- Phylum: Chordata
- Class: Aves
- Order: Passeriformes
- Family: Furnariidae
- Genus: Cranioleuca
- Species: C. albicapilla

Binomial name
- Cranioleuca albicapilla (Cabanis, 1873)

= Creamy-crested spinetail =

Species of bird

The creamy-crested spinetail (Cranioleuca albicapilla) is a species of bird in the Furnariinae subfamily of the ovenbird family Furnariidae. It is endemic to Peru.

== Taxonomy and systematics ==
The creamy-crested spinetail has two subspecies, the nominate C. a. albicapilla (Cabanis, 1873) and C. a. albigula (Zimmer, JT, 1924).

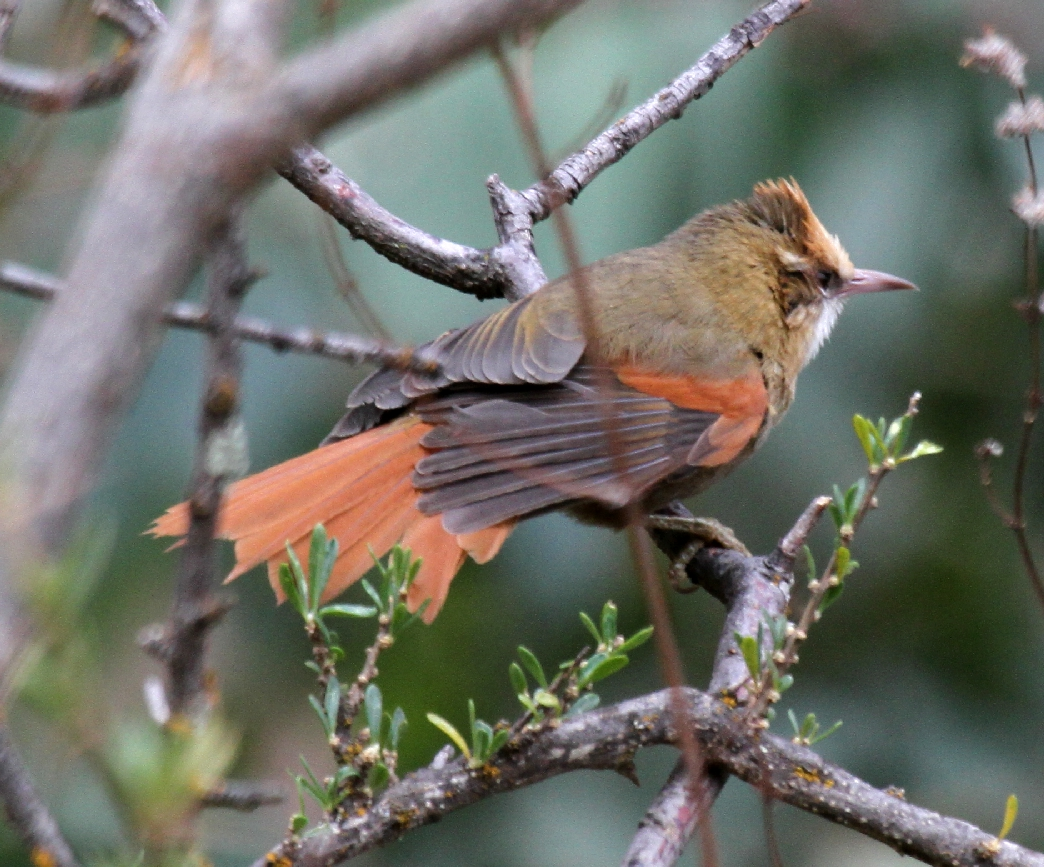
Northeast of Cuzco, Peru

== Description ==
The creamy-crested spinetail is 16 to 17 cm (6.3 to 6.7 in) long and weighs 18 to 24 g (0.63 to 0.85 oz). It is a large member of genus Cranioleuca and has a distinctive head pattern. The sexes have the same plumage. Adults of the nominate subspecies have a narrow whitish supercilium and gray-brown lores on an otherwise buffy face with some streaking. Their crown and crest are creamy-white. Their back is olivaceous gray that is browner at the rump. Their wing coverts are dark rufous and their flight feathers dull brown. Their tail is rufous; it is graduated and the feathers have pointed tips. Their throat and belly are pale gray and their breast, flanks, and undertail coverts are darker gray. Their iris is chestnut to gray, their bill gray to pinkish, and their legs and feet olive-yellow to greenish yellow. Juveniles have a pale yellowish forehead and throat, a sooty nape and upper belly, and a strong ochraceous wash on their underparts. Compared to the nominate, subspecies C. a. albigula has a more ochraceous crown, a browner back, a more richly colored rump, and more reddish uppertail coverts. Their throat is white and their underparts have a strong buff wash. The two subspecies intergrade where their ranges meet.

== Distribution and habitat ==
Subspecies C. a. albigula of the creamy-crested spinetail is the more northerly of the two. It is found in the Andes of central Peru from the Department of Junín south to Ayacucho and Apurímac departments. The nominate subspecies is found in the Andes of southern Peru in the departments of Cuzco, Ayacucho, and Apurímac. The species inhabits semi-humid and humid montane forest and woodlands. It also occurs in cloudforest and Polylepis woodlands. In elevation it mostly ranges between 2,400 and 3,650 m (7,900 and 12,000 ft) but is found as high as 4,240 m (13,900 ft).

== Behavior ==
=== Movement ===
The creamy-crested spinetail is a year-round resident throughout its range.

=== Feeding ===
The creamy-crested spinetail feeds on arthropods; though details are lacking the species' mix of habitats suggests that its diet is highly varied. It typically forages singly or in pairs and often joins mixed-species feeding flocks. It probes for and gleans its prey from bark, vegetation, lichens, and moss while hitching acrobatically along trunks and branches. It tends to feed in the forest's lower levels between about 2 and 8 m (5 and 25 ft) above the ground, and often in dense vine tangles.

=== Breeding ===
The creamy-crested spinetail's breeding season has not been determined though fledglings have been observed in May. The species' nest is a globe of moss, twigs, and bark strips with an entrance at the bottom; it is usually hung from the end of a branch. Nothing else is known about the species' breeding biology.

=== Vocalization ===
The creamy-crested spinetail's song is "a loud, ascending-descending series of semi-musical notes: tch, tch, tleep-chee-chee-cheechee-ee-ee-ee-ee-trrrr" and is often given in duet. Its calls include "a rising tlee'lee", "a loud, semi-whistled dew", and a "rapid series of tleep notes".

== Status ==
The IUCN has assessed the creamy-crested spinetail as being of Least Concern. It has a small range and an unknown population size but the latter is believed to be stable. No immediate threats have been identified. It occurs in at least three protected areas. Though it somewhat tolerates some habitat degradation, "[p]opulations of Creamy-crested Spinetail that inhabit Polylepis and semi-humid montane woodlands are under threat locally through large scale clearing of land by agriculture and firewood extraction".
