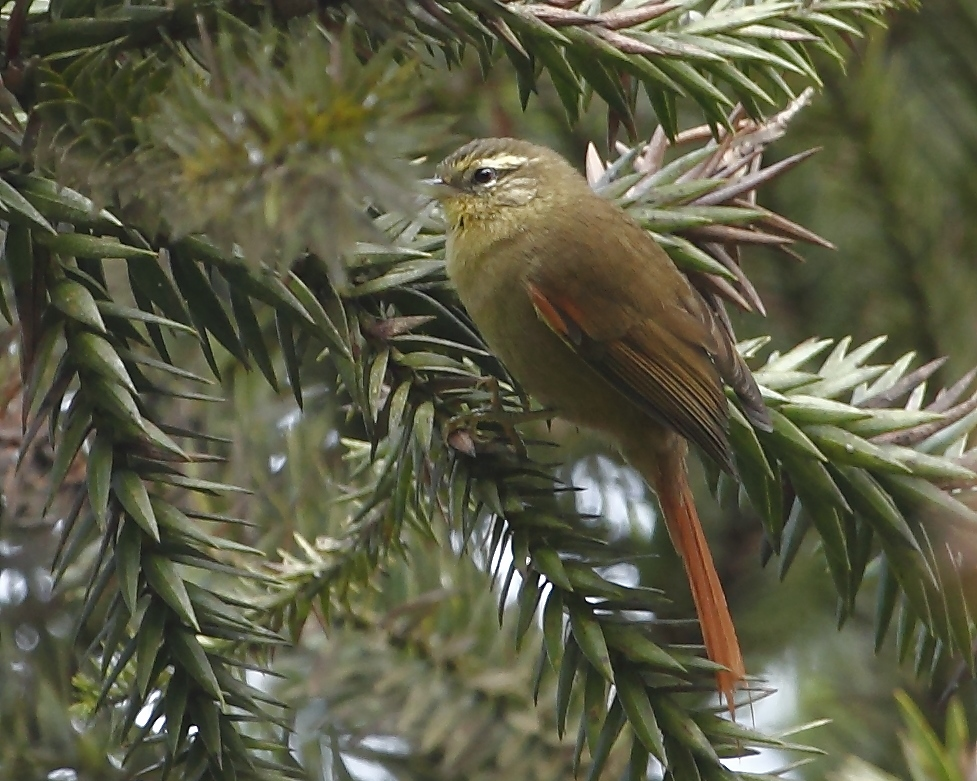

Conservation status
- Least Concern (IUCN 3.1)

Scientific classification
- Kingdom: Animalia
- Phylum: Chordata
- Class: Aves
- Order: Passeriformes
- Family: Furnariidae
- Genus: Cranioleuca
- Species: C. obsoleta

Binomial name
- Cranioleuca obsoleta (Reichenbach, 1853)

= Olive spinetail =

Species of bird

The olive spinetail (Cranioleuca obsoleta) is a species of bird in the Furnariinae subfamily of the ovenbird family Furnariidae. It is found in Argentina, Brazil, and Paraguay.

== Taxonomy and systematics ==
The olive spinetail is monotypic. It is closely related to the sister species stripe-crowned spinetail (C. pyrrhophia) and pallid spinetail (C. pallida). The olive and stripe-crowned spinetails hybridize in southern Brazil.

== Description ==
The olive spinetail is 12.5 to 15 cm (4.9 to 5.9 in) long and weighs 12 to 16 g (0.42 to 0.56 oz). It is a smallish, short-billed, member of genus Cranioleuca. The sexes have the same plumage. Adults have a whitish supercilium, a dull brown band behind the eye, buff and brown streaky ear coverts, and a plain buff malar area. Their forehead is streaked brown and buff, their crown is dull brownish olive, and their back and rump are a slightly richer brown. Their tail is chestnut-rufous; the feathers are graduated and lack barbs at the end giving a spiky appearance. Their wing coverts are dark chestnut-rufous, their primary coverts dark brown, and their flight feathers warm brown. Their throat is whitish, their breast buffy brownish, their belly pale olive-buff, and their flanks and undertail coverts somewhat darker. Their iris is variable, their maxilla black to dark brownish, their mandible pinkish, bluish gray, or whitish with a dark tip, and their legs and feet grayish olive to olive-green. Juveniles have darker upperparts than adults, with variable scaling on the breast.

== Distribution and habitat ==
The olive spinetail is found from southern São Paulo state in southeastern Brazil south through eastern Paraguay into northeastern Argentina as far as northern Corrientes Province. It inhabits humid forest, both prinary and secondary, and woodlands dominated by Araucaria. In elevation it ranges from near sea level to 1,000 m (3,300 ft).

== Behavior ==
=== Movement ===
The olive spinetail is a year-round resident throughout its range.

=== Feeding ===
The olive spinetail feeds on arthropods. It typically forages in pairs and often joins mixed-species feeding flocks. It acrobatically gleans prey from bark, moss, and epiphytes. It hitches and climbs along trunks and small branches, mostly in the forest's mid-storey but occasionally to its canopy.

=== Breeding ===
The olive spinetail's breeding season is probably the austral spring and summer; eggs have been noted in October. It is thought to be monogamous. Its nest is thought to be a ball of moss with a side entrance. Nothing else is known about its breeding biology.

=== Vocalization ===
The olive spinetail's song is a "short series, at first extr. high and hesitant 'tzit-tzit-tzit', and then a short trill ending in a very high '-sfeet-sfeet-sfeet' ". Its calls are "tst" and a "short, hard trill"; the second is also described as a "soft, dry, hurried trill".

== Status ==
The IUCN has assessed the olive spinetail as being of Least Concern. It has a large range and an unknown population size that is believed to be decreasing. No immediate threats have been identified. It is considered generally fairly common to common though rare in Paraguay and occurs in a few protected areas. However, it has a "relatively small range, within which extensive deforestation has dramatically reduced [the] total area of its habitat".
