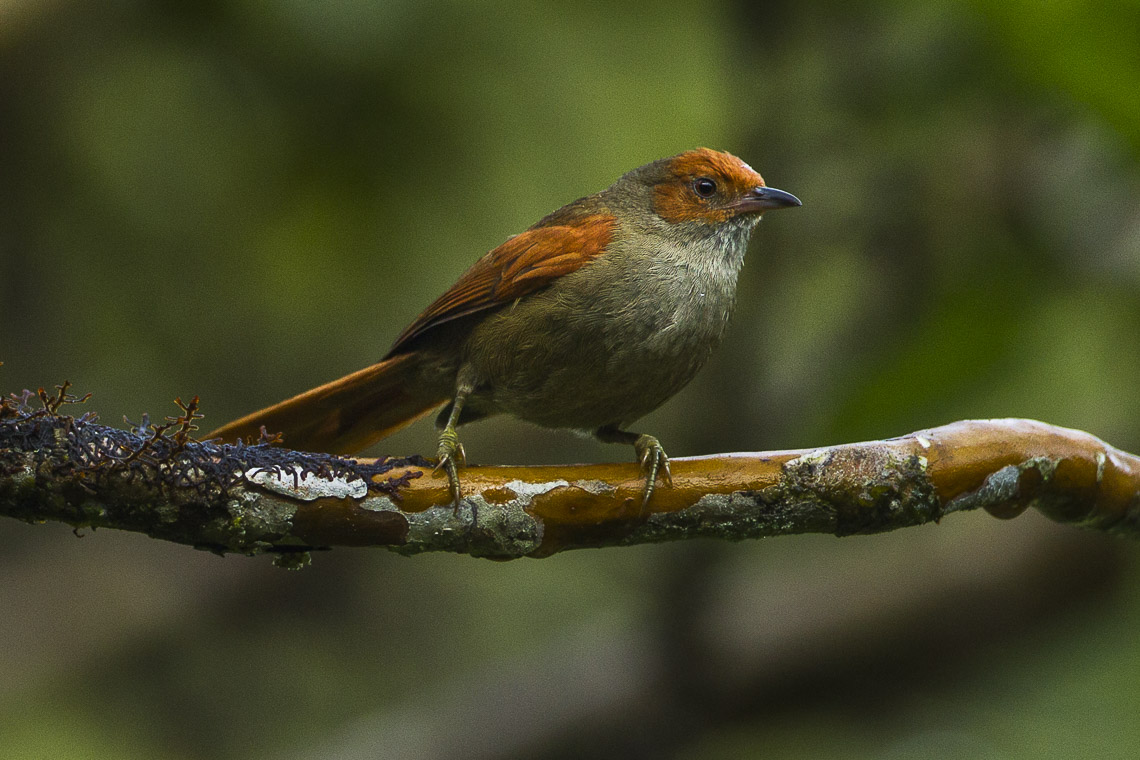

Conservation status
- Least Concern (IUCN 3.1)

Scientific classification
- Kingdom: Animalia
- Phylum: Chordata
- Class: Aves
- Order: Passeriformes
- Family: Furnariidae
- Genus: Cranioleuca
- Species: C. erythrops

Binomial name
- Cranioleuca erythrops (Sclater, PL, 1860)

= Red-faced spinetail =

Species of bird

The red-faced spinetail (Cranioleuca erythrops) is a species of bird in the Furnariinae subfamily of the ovenbird family Furnariidae. It is found in Colombia, Costa Rica, Ecuador, and Panama.

== Taxonomy and systematics ==
The red-faced spinetail has three subspecies, the nominate C. e. erythrops (Sclater, PL, 1860), C. e. rufigenis (Lawrence, 1868), and C. e. griseigularis (Ridgway, 1909).

== Description ==
The red-faced spinetail is 14 to 15 cm (5.5 to 5.9 in) long and weighs 13 to 20 g (0.46 to 0.71 oz). The sexes have the same plumage. Adults of the nominate subspecies have a rufous face and crown. Their nape and back are rich olive-brown that is richer and brighter on the rump and uppertail coverts. Their wings are rufous and their flight feathers have slightly duller edges and dark fuscous tips. Their tail is reddish chestnut; it is graduated and the feathers lack barbs on the ends giving a spiny appearance. Their chin is brownish gray and the rest of their underparts dull olivaceous brown. Their iris is orange to reddish brown to brown, their maxilla blackish to dark fuscous, their mandible grayish horn or pinkish with a blackish tip, and their legs and feet brownish olive to greenish gray. Juveniles have an olive-brown crown, dull rufous edges on the wing coverts, an ochraceous wash on the throat and breast, and sometimes a narrow buff supercilium.

Compared to the nominate, subspecies C. e. griseigularis has a brighter, more cinnamon, tone to the central tail feathers and a grayer breast; in the southern part of its range the breast is grayer, the crown darker, and the back less reddish than those of the more northerly individuals. Subspecies C. e. rufigenis has more extensive rufous on the face than the nominate and entirely rufous central tail feathers.

== Distribution and habitat ==
Subspecies C. e. rufigenis of the red-faced spinetail is the northernmost. It is found in the mountains of Costa Rica and western Panama. Subspecies C. e. griseigularis is found in extreme eastern Panama, the Western Andes of Colombia as far south as Nariño Department, the west slope of Colombia's Central Andes as far south as Quindío Department, and the Serranía de San Lucas in northern Colombia. The nominate subspecies is found in the Andes of western Ecuador south to Azuay Province and in the coastal Cordillera de Mache.

The red-faced spinetail mostly inhabits lower to mid-elevation subtropical montane forest and woodlands including mature secondary forest. In coastal Ecuador it occurs locally in tropical and deciduous forest. In Costa Rica it occurs between 700 and 2,000 m (2,300 and 6,600 ft) of elevation, in Panama between 1,200 and 2,300 m (3,900 and 7,500 ft), in Colombia between 800 and 2,000 m (2,600 and 6,600 ft), and in Ecuador mostly between 700 and 1,500 m (2,300 and 4,900 ft) but occurs almost to sea level in the Cordillera de Mache.

== Behavior ==
=== Movement ===
The red-faced spinetail is a year-round resident throughout its range.

=== Feeding ===
The red-faced spinetail feeds mostly on arthropods but also includes protein corpuscles from Cecropia trees in its diet. It forages singly or in pairs and usually as part of a mixed-species feeding flock. It mainly feeds in the forest's middle levels but also more widely from the understorey to the subcanopy. It gleans prey from bark, moss, dead leaves, and debris while hitching along small branches; it often hangs upside down to catch prey.

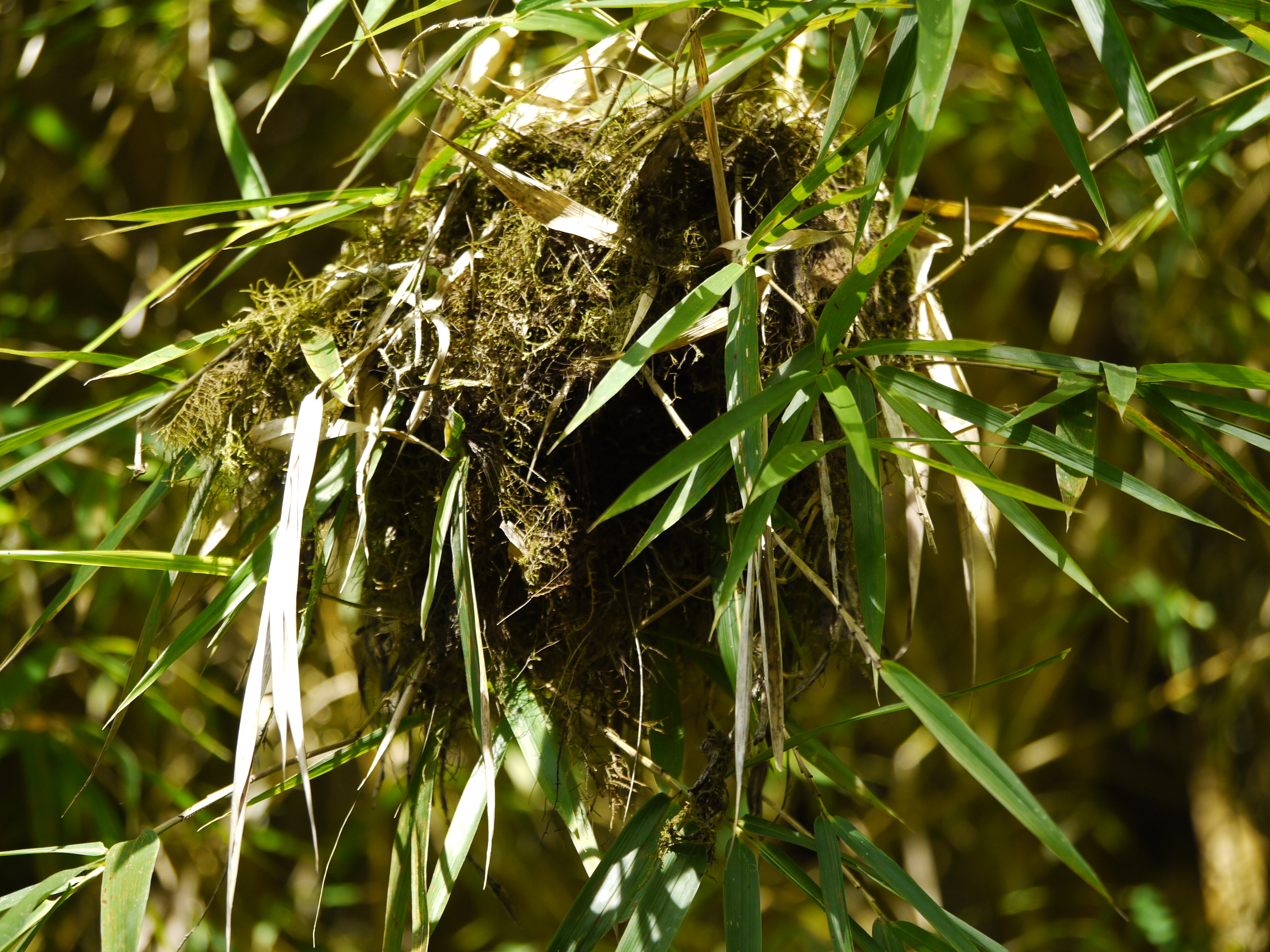
A nest masquerading as debris.

=== Breeding ===
The red-faced spinetail's breeding season varies geographically, from March to June in Central America and later (to November) in Ecuador. Its nest is a ball of moss, vine stems, and sometimes dead leaves with an entrance at the bottom and an inner chamber lined with plant fibers and leaves. It typically hangs from the end of a thin branch about 5 to 12 m (15 to 40 ft) above the ground.

The red-faced spinetail places bits of grass and other material loosely dangling above and below the nest chamber to break the shape of the nest and to cause it to resemble random debris without any underlying structure. This is considered a case of protection of its nest from predators by camouflage or "masquerade".

=== Vocalization ===
The red-faced spinetail's song is a "high-pitched, fast, scratchy chatter-trill, 'seet-seet-seet-se-e-e-e-e-e-e-e' or 'ukukuk-ikikikikik' ". It is also described as a "rapid ascending series of squeaky 'sfi' notes sometimes turning into twittering chatter at end". The species' calls are "a short, high-pitched 'prrreep' " and " 'chi-tik' or or 'chiti-chik' ".

== Status ==
The IUCN has assessed the red-face spinetail as being of Least Concern. It has a very large range and an estimated population of at least 50,000 mature individuals; the latter is believed to be decreasing. No immediate threats have been identified. It is considered fairly common throughout its range and occurs in a few protected areas.
