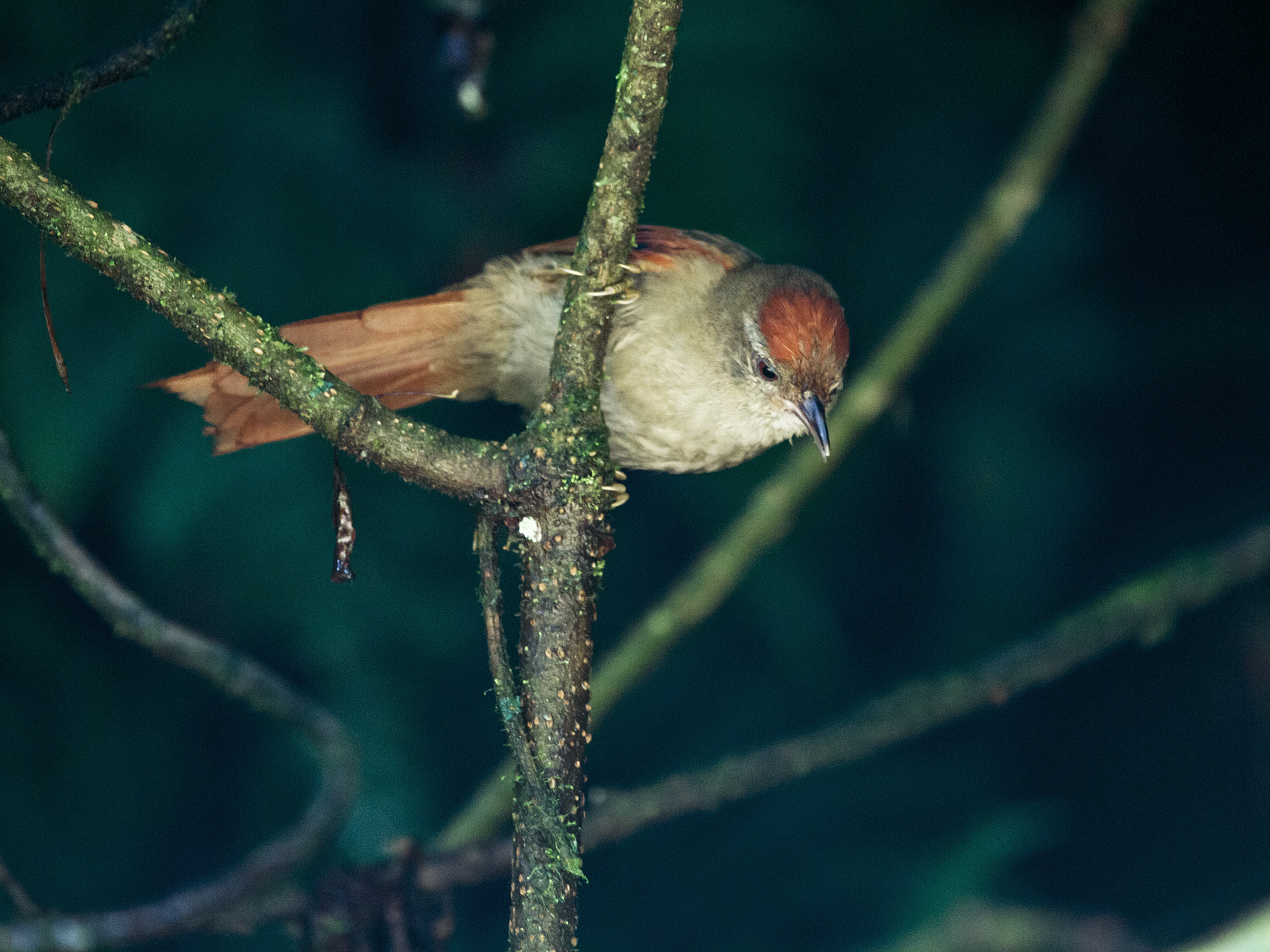

Conservation status
- Least Concern (IUCN 3.1)

Scientific classification
- Kingdom: Animalia
- Phylum: Chordata
- Class: Aves
- Order: Passeriformes
- Family: Furnariidae
- Genus: Cranioleuca
- Species: C. curtata

Binomial name
- Cranioleuca curtata (Sclater, PL, 1870)

= Ash-browed spinetail =

Species of bird

The ash-browed spinetail (Cranioleuca curtata) is a species of bird in the Furnariinae subfamily of the ovenbird family Furnariidae. It is found in Bolivia, Colombia, Ecuador, and Peru.

== Taxonomy and systematics ==
The ash-browed spinetail has three subspecies, the nominate C. c. curtata (Sclater, PL, 1870), C. c. cisandina (Taczanowski, 1882), and C. c. debilis (Berlepsch & Stolzmann, 1906). Subspecies C. c. cisandina had originally been described as a separate species.

== Description ==
The ash-browed spinetail is 14 to 15 cm (5.5 to 5.9 in) long and weighs 14 to 21 g (0.49 to 0.74 oz). The sexes have the same plumage. Adults of the nominate subspecies have a supercilium that varies from bold whitish to obscure dingy gray. The rest of their face is dull brownish with some pale streaks on the ear coverts. Their forehead is brown with some reddish chestnut, their crown reddish chestnut, and their back rich brown that becomes increasingly reddish by the uppertail coverts. Their wings are reddish chestnut; their flight feathers are slightly paler with dark fuscous tips. Their tail is dark reddish chestnut; it is graduated and the feathers sometimes lack barbs on their tips. Their chin is very pale brownish gray, their throat browner with light streaking, and their underparts dull browish with slightily richer brown flanks. Their iris is chestnut to brown, their maxilla dark brown to blackish, their mandible pinkish (usually with a dark tip), and their legs and feet olive-greenish to mustard-yellow. Juveniles have a strong supercilium, a mostly brown crown with some chestnut, and ochraceous rufous underparts. Subspecies C. c. cisandina has darker and more chestnut crown, wings, and tail than the nominate, and also a darker brown back and darker grayish tones on the underparts. C. c. debilis is similar to cisandina but overall paler with a chestnut forehead.

== Distribution and habitat ==
The nominate subspecies of the ash-browed spinetail is the northernmost. It is found on the west slope of Colombia's Eastern Andes between the departments of Santander and Huila. Subspecies C. c. cisandina is found on the eastern slope of the Andes from Caquetá Department in Colombia south through eastern Ecuador and into Peru at least as far as the Department of Cuzco. C. c. debilis is found from Peru's departments of Ayacucho and Cuzco south to Santa Cruz Department in Bolivia.

The ash-browed spinetail inhabits humid foothill and lower subtropical forest and montane evergreen forest. In elevation it ranges between 800 and 2,300 m (2,600 and 7,500 ft) in Colombia and mostly between 900 and 1,700 m (3,000 and 5,600 ft) in Ecuador, Peru, and Bolivia. It occurs locally as low as 650 m (2,100 ft) and as high as 2,500 m (8,200 ft).

== Behavior ==
=== Movement ===
The ash-browed spinetail is a year-round resident throughout its range.

=== Feeding ===
The ash-browed spinetail feeds on arthropods. It forages singly and in pairs and usually as part of a mixed-species feeding flock. It usually feeds from the forest's middle levels to its subcanopy. It acrobatically probes for and gleans prey from bark, moss, epiphytes, dead leaves, and debris while hitching along small branches, sometimes hanging upside down.

=== Breeding ===
Essentially nothing is known about the ash-browed spinetail's breeding biology. One fledgling was seen in March in northern Ecuador.

=== Vocalization ===
The ash-browed spinetail's song has variously been described as "a high-pitched, accelerating, descending and fading series of shrill notes with bouncing-ball rhythm", a "fast, accelerating, but fading trill", and "a fast and sprightly series of shrill notes that usually ends in a trill and fades in intensity".

== Status ==
The IUCN originally assessed the ash-browed spinetail as being of Least Concern, then in 2012 as Vulnerable, and then in 2021 again as of Least Concern. It has a very large range and an unknown population size that is believed to be decreasing. "The primary threat to this species is accelerating deforestation as forests within the range are converted for ranching and farming." It is considered uncommon to fairly common. It is thought to be susceptible to forest fragmentation, but occurs in many protected areas both governmental and private.
