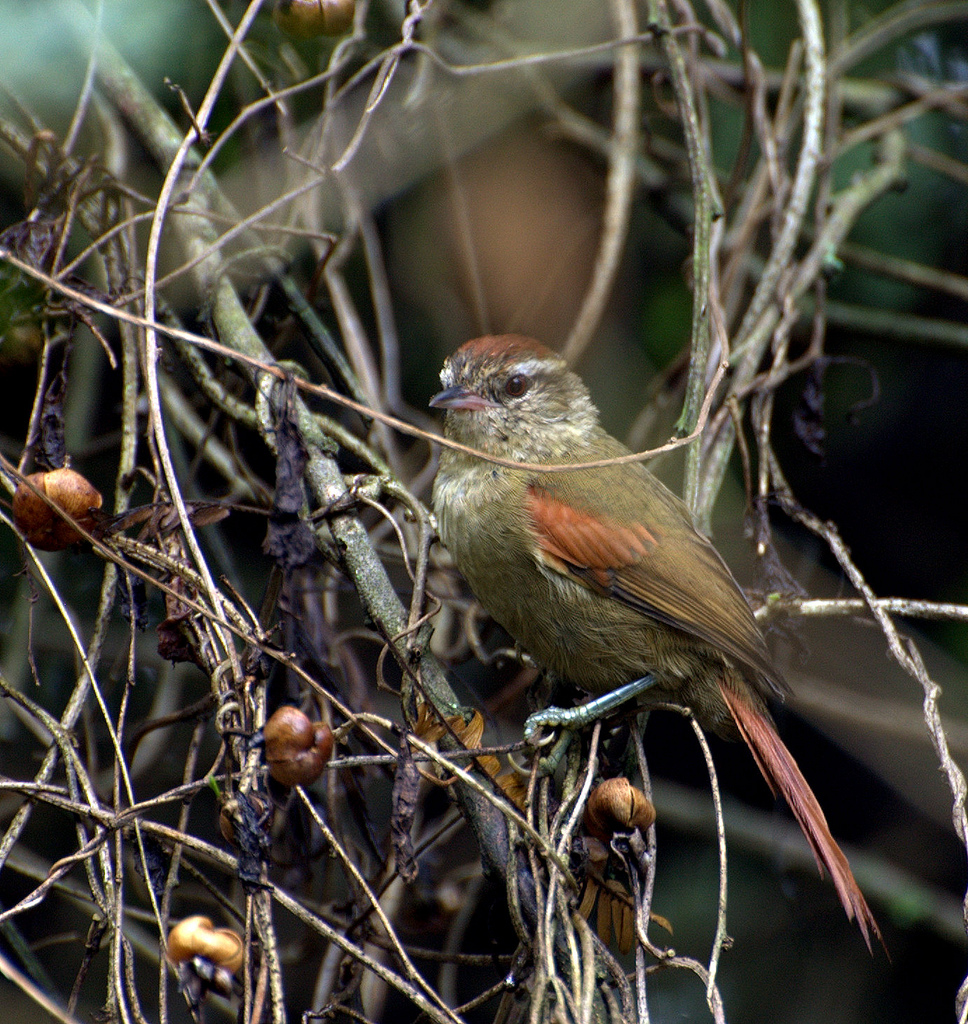

Conservation status
- Least Concern (IUCN 3.1)

Scientific classification
- Kingdom: Animalia
- Phylum: Chordata
- Class: Aves
- Order: Passeriformes
- Family: Furnariidae
- Genus: Cranioleuca
- Species: C. pallida

Binomial name
- Cranioleuca pallida (Wied, 1831)

= Pallid spinetail =

Species of bird

The pallid spinetail (Cranioleuca pallida) is a species of bird in the Furnariinae subfamily of the ovenbird family Furnariidae. It is endemic to Brazil.

== Taxonomy and systematics ==
The pallid spinetail is monotypic. It and the stripe-crowned spinetail (C. pyrrhophia) are sister species, and the two are closely related to the olive spinetail (C. obsoleta).

== Description ==
The pallid spinetail is 14 to 15 cm (5.5 to 5.9 in) long and weighs 11 to 12 g (0.39 to 0.42 oz). It is a smallish member of genus Cranioleuca. The sexes have the same plumage. Adults have a wide whitish supercilium, a blackish spot in front of the eye, a dark brown band behind the eye, and buffy ear coverts with faint dark brownish streaks. Their forehead is streaked blackish and buff, their crown is dark rufous, and their nape gray. Their back and rump are tawny-olive or olive-brown. Their tail is dark rufous; the feathers are graduated and lack barbs at the end giving a spiky appearance. Their wing coverts are rufous, their primary coverts dark brown, and their flight feathers pale cinnamon-tawny to pale olive-tawny. Their chin is buffy whitish, their throat and breast bright buffy to brownish olive, their belly duller pale brownish olive, and flanks and undertail coverts slightly darker. Their iris is reddish brown to pale brown, their maxilla black to dusky horn, their mandible pinkish with a dusky tip, and their legs and feet greenish olive or gray. Juveniles have a darker back than adults, with a brown crown, ochraceous-tinged underparts, and variable dark mottling on the breast.

== Distribution and habitat ==
The pallid spinetail is found in southeastern Brazil from southern Goiás, central Minas Gerais, and southeastern Bahia south into eastern Paraná. It inhabits montane evergreen forest, woodlands, and mature secondary forest. In elevation it ranges from 700 to 2,150 m (2,300 to 7,100 ft).

== Behavior ==
=== Movement ===
The pallid spinetail is a year-round resident throughout its range.

=== Feeding ===
The pallid spinetail feeds on arthropods. It typically forages in pairs and usually joins mixed-species feeding flocks. It acrobatically gleans prey from vines, dead leaves, bark, trapped debris, fruit, and flowers. It hitches and climbs along small branches from the forest's mid-storey to its canopy.

=== Breeding ===
The pallid spinetail is thought to be monogamous and to breed in the austral spring and summer. Its nest is a globe of lichen and moss with a side entrance, typically placed on a tree branch against the trunk or atop a clump of epiphytes. The clutch size, incubation period, time to fledging, and details of parental care are not known.

=== Vocalization ===
The pallid spinetail's song is an "extr. high, slightly descending series of about 5 'seetseet---tut' notes (often accelerated to a trill at the end)". Its call is "tééé-ssik, tséé-ssik".

== Status ==
The IUCN has assessed the pallid spinetail as being of Least Concern. It has a large range and an unknown population size that is believed to be decreasing. No immediate threats have been identified. It is considered fairly common to common and occurs in a few protected areas. However, "[e]xtensive deforestation within its relatively small range has dramatically reduced available habitat".
