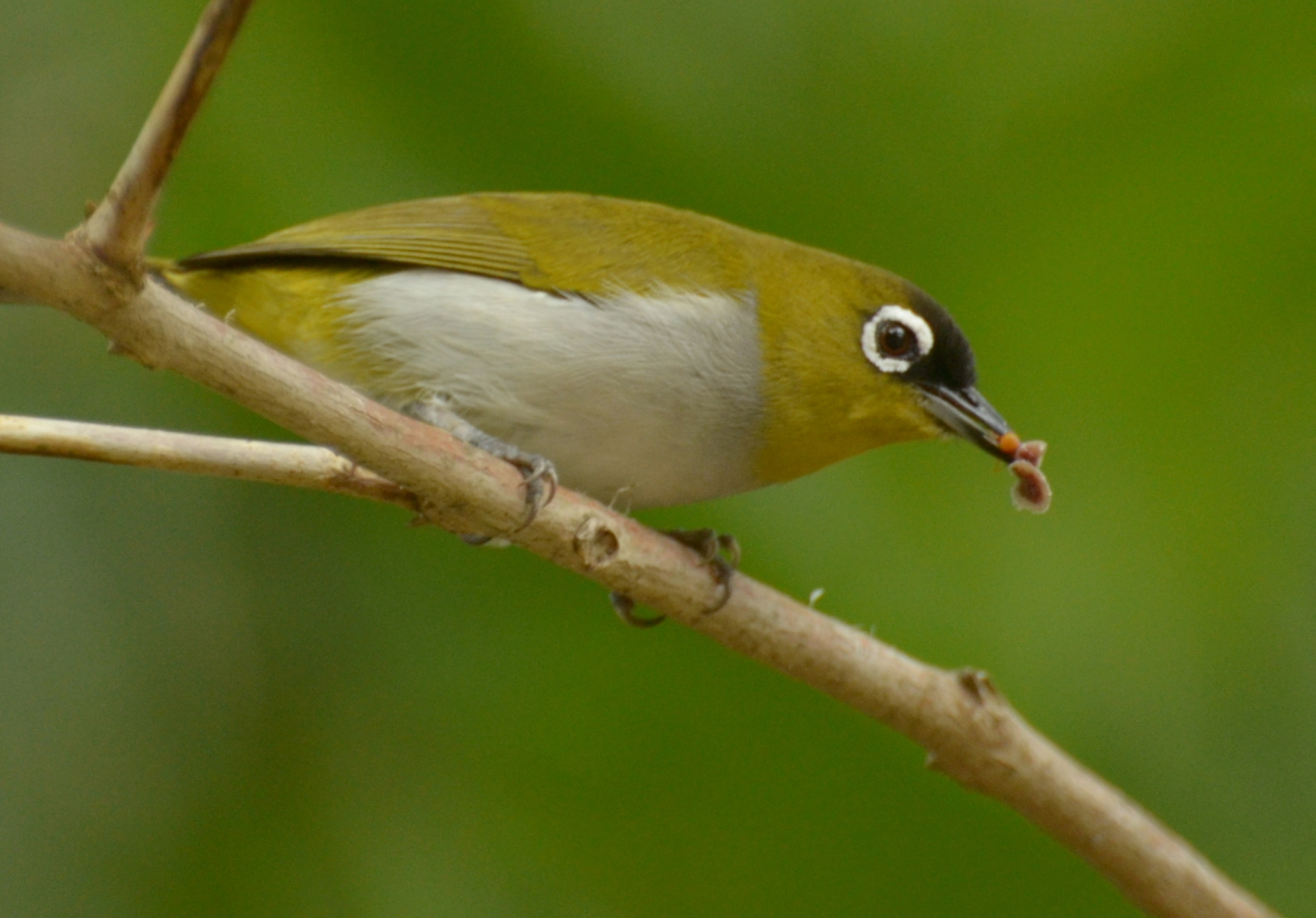
- The nominate subspecies at Manadao in North Sulawesi, Indonesia

Conservation status
- Least Concern (IUCN 3.1)

Scientific classification
- Kingdom: Animalia
- Phylum: Chordata
- Class: Aves
- Order: Passeriformes
- Family: Zosteropidae
- Genus: Zosterops
- Species: Z. atrifrons

Binomial name
- Zosterops atrifrons Wallace, 1864

= Black-crowned white-eye =

Species of bird

The black-crowned white-eye (Zosterops atrifrons) is a songbird species. It is closely related to the Old World babblers, and its family Zosteropidae might better be included in the Tiimalidae. Its subspecies from the Sulawesi region might warrant recognition as distinct species Z. subatrifrons. The Sangihe white-eye (Z. nehrkorni) and the Seram white-eye (Z. stalkeri) were formerly included in Z. atrifrons, as is still, on occasion, the black-fronted white-eye (Z. minor).

It is endemic to Indonesia. Its natural habitats are subtropical or tropical moist lowland forests and subtropical or tropical moist montane forests. Quite common, it is not considered a threatened species by the IUCN.

== Gallery ==
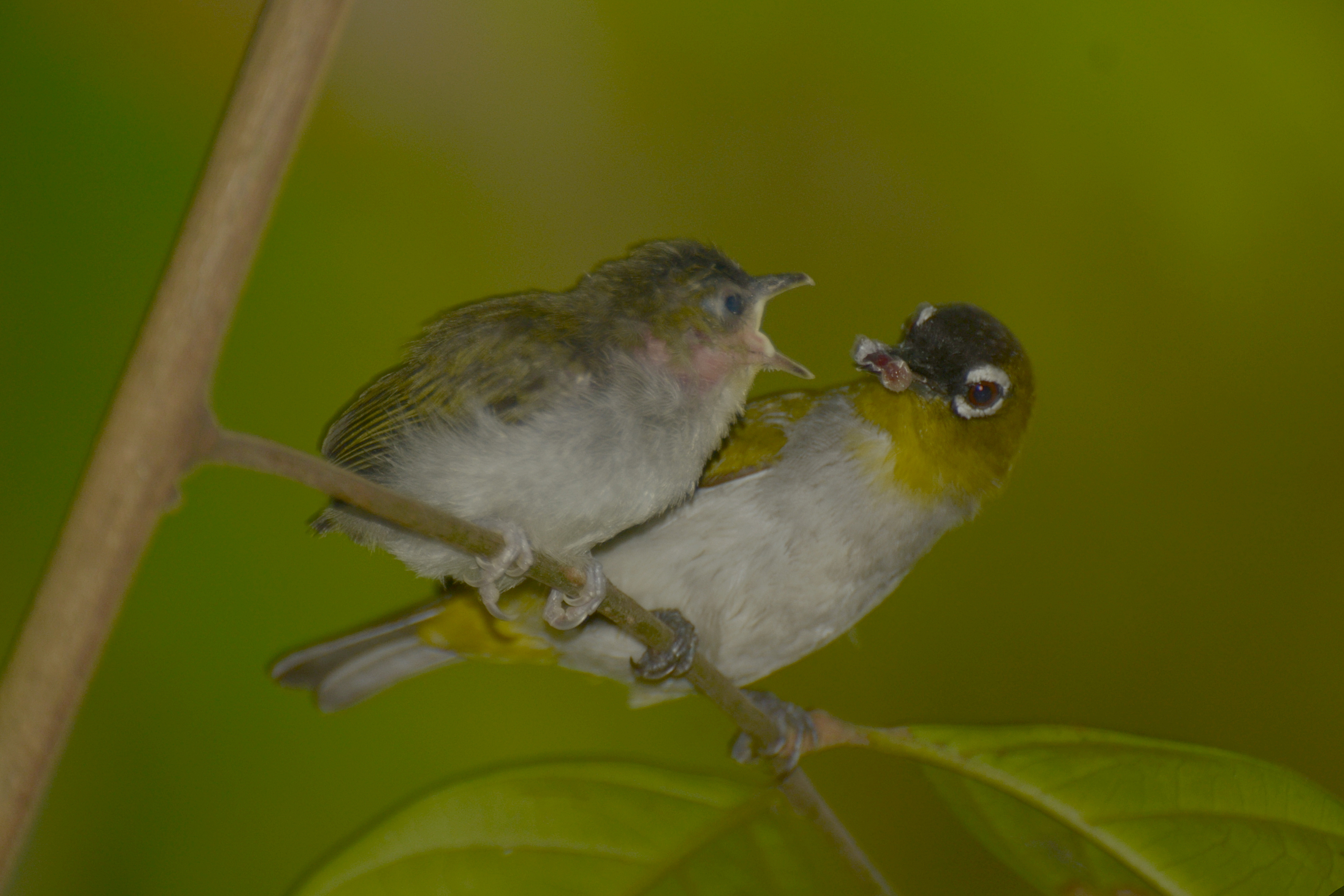

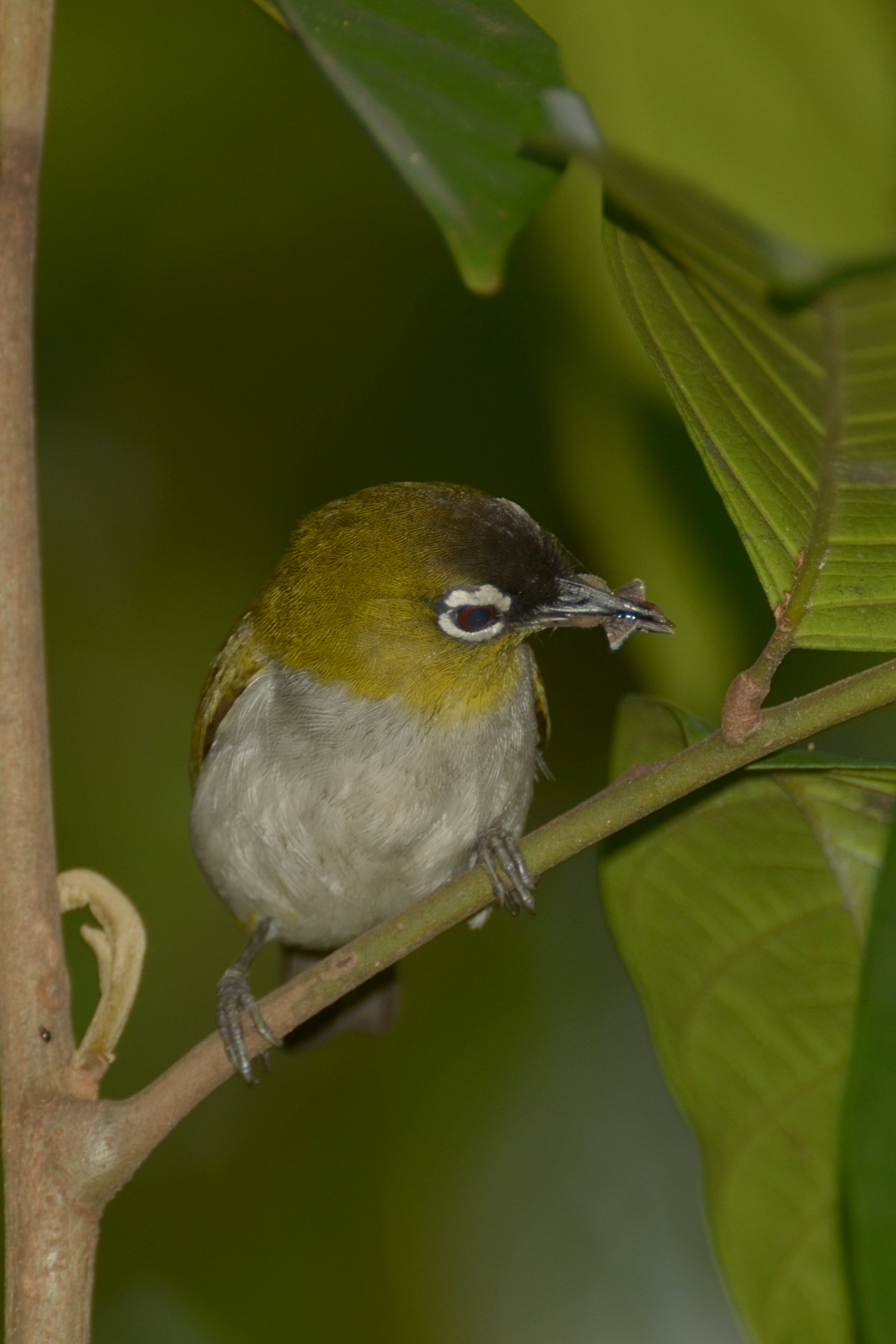

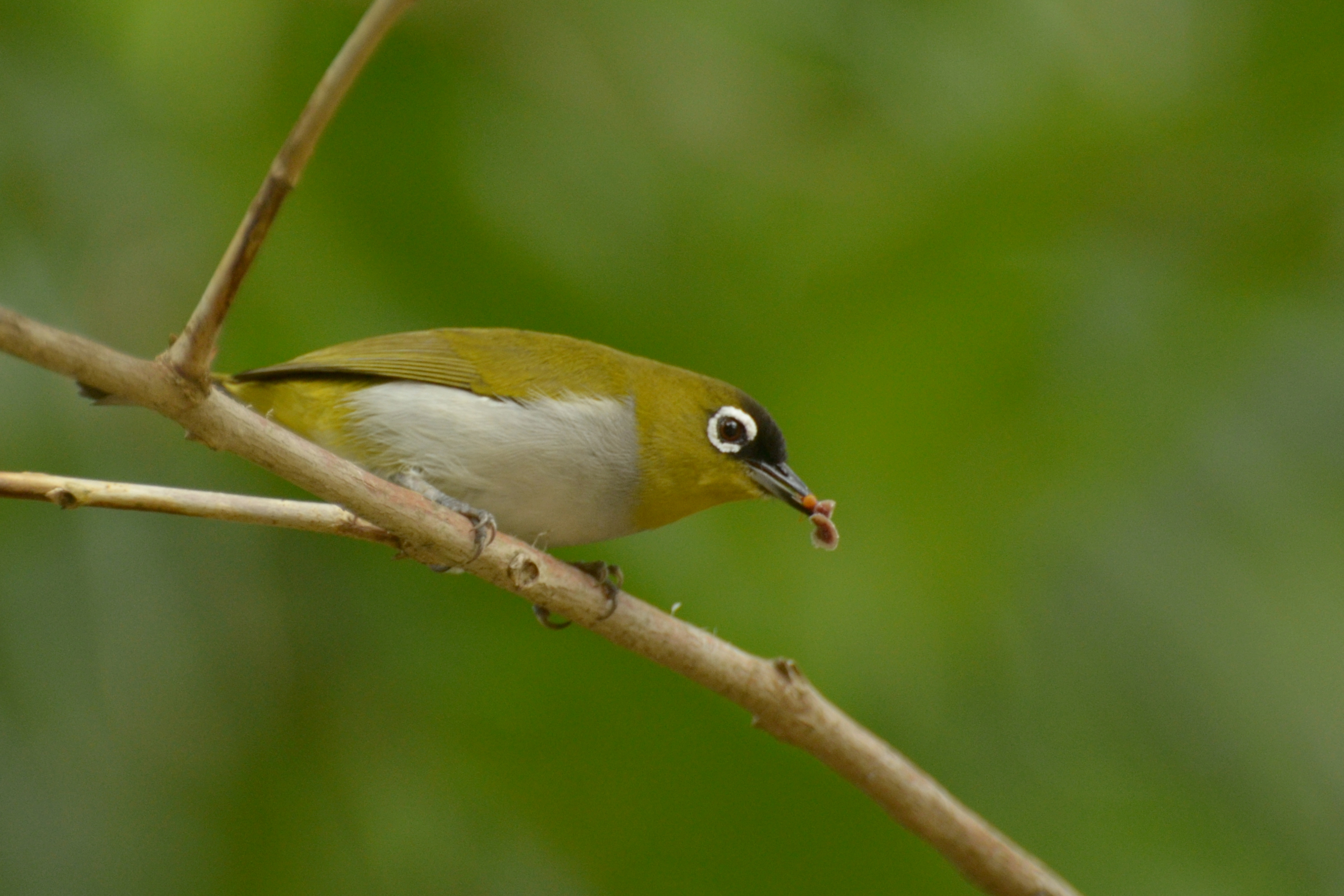

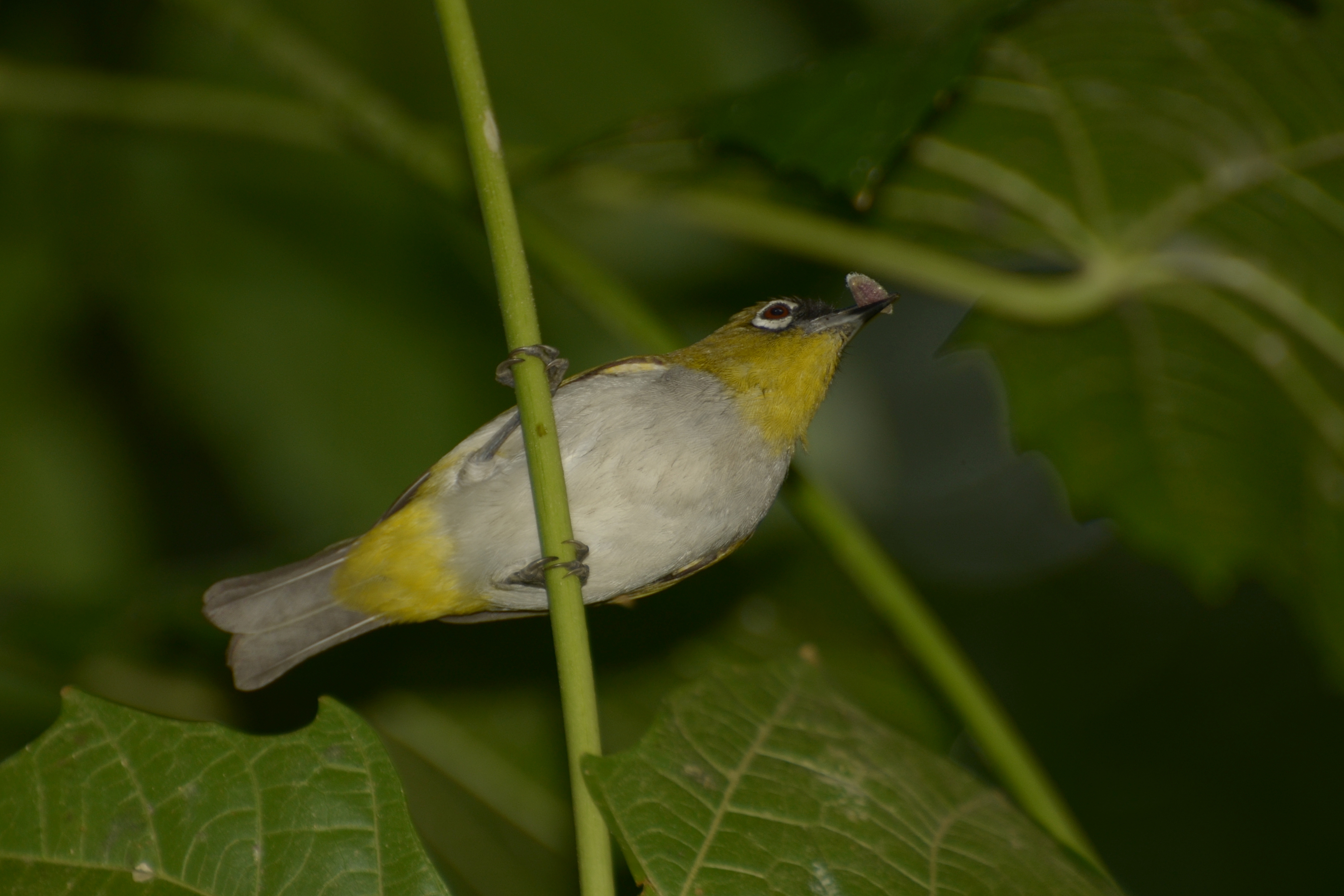

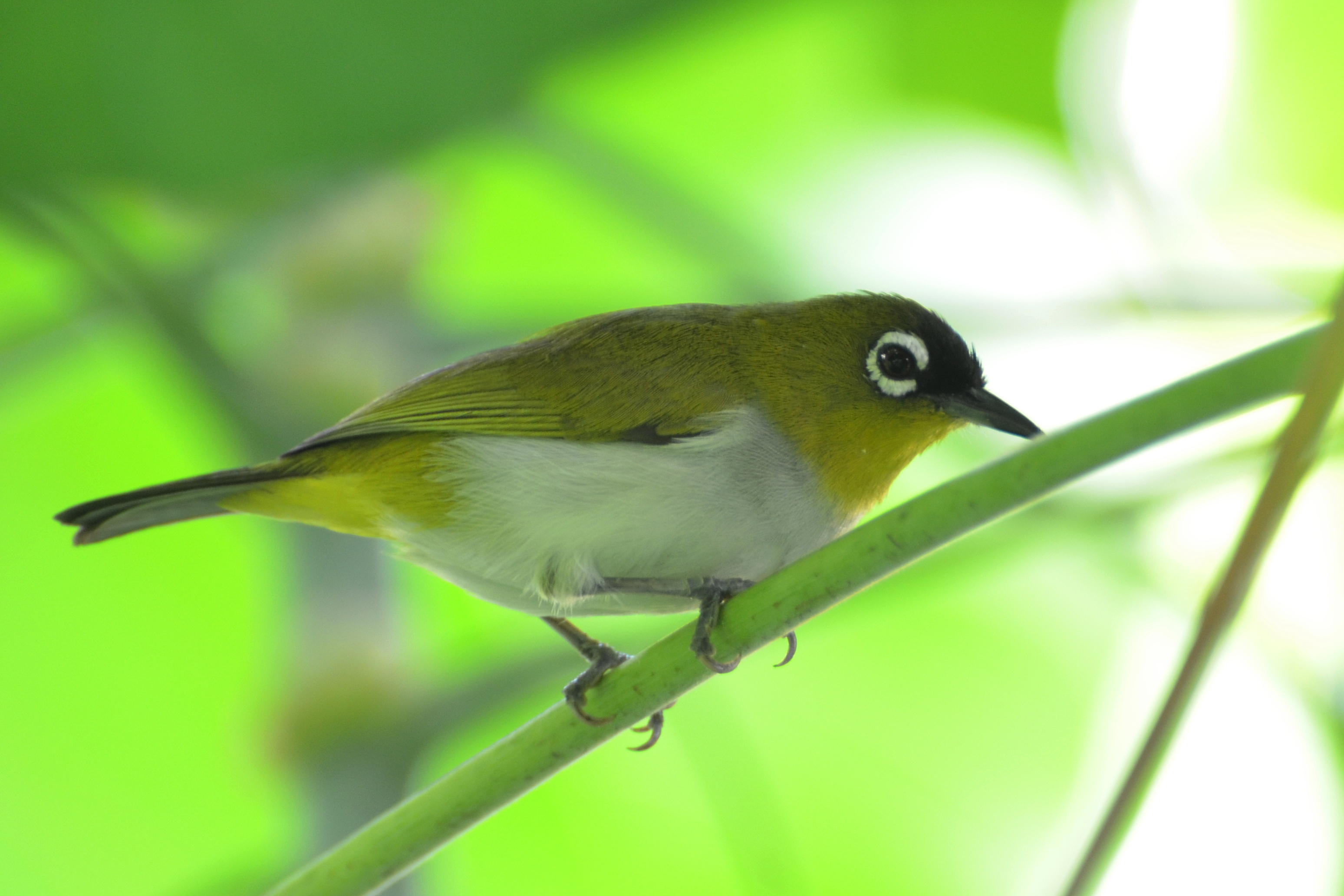

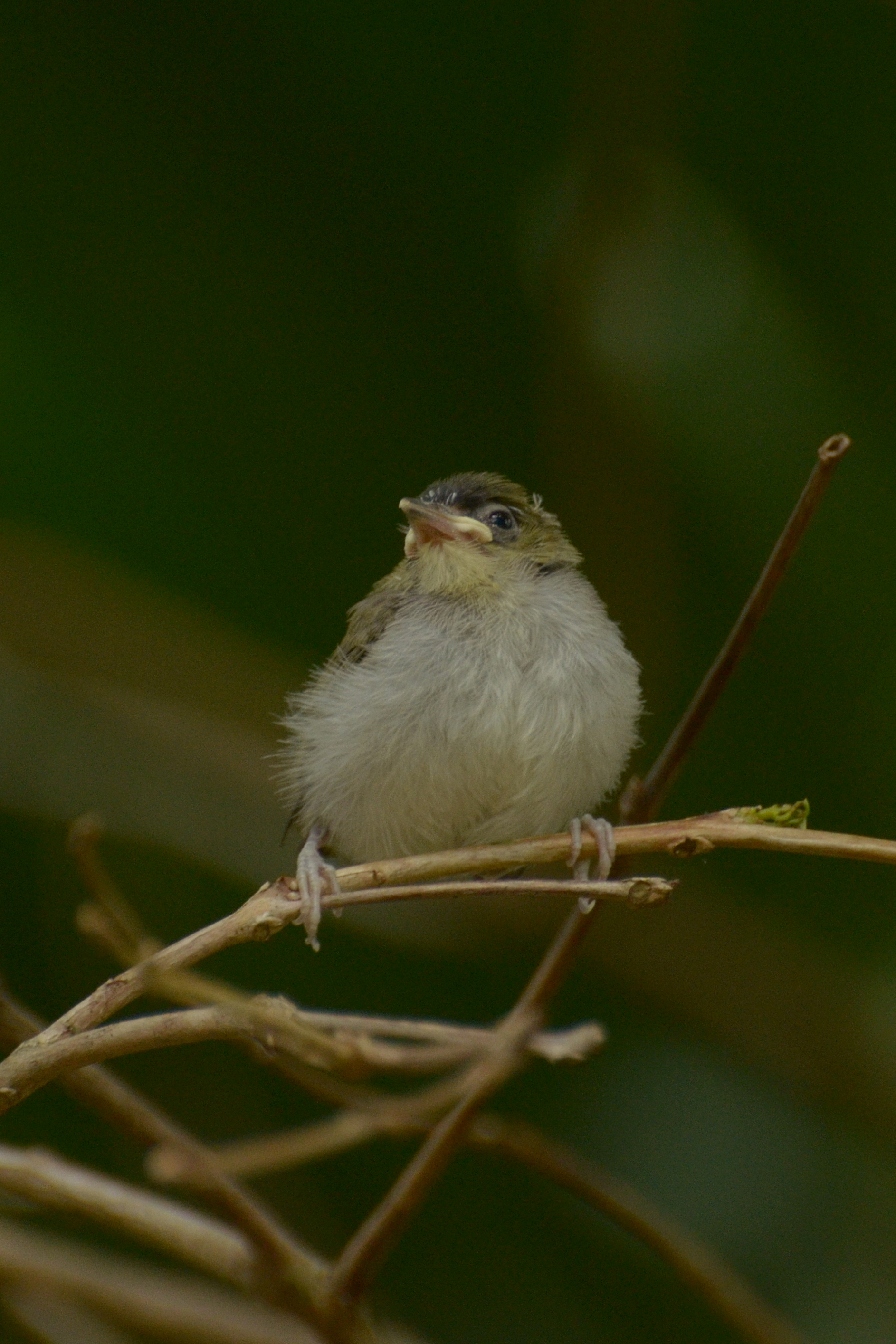

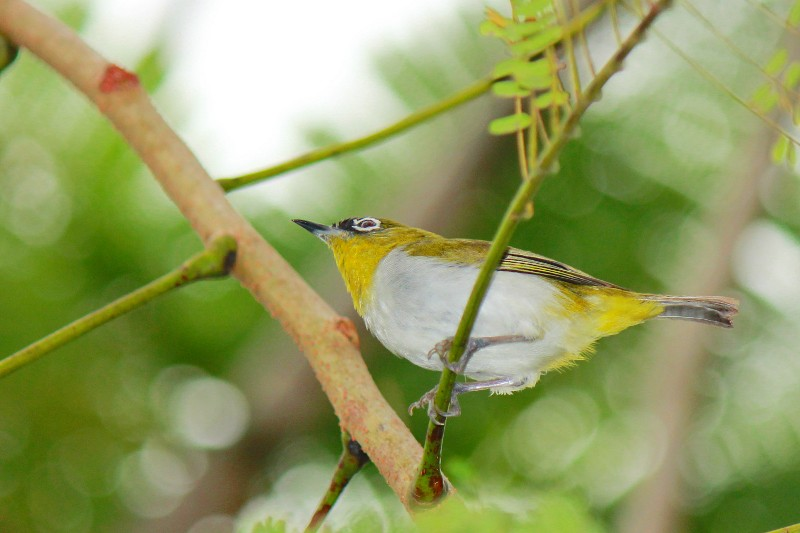
