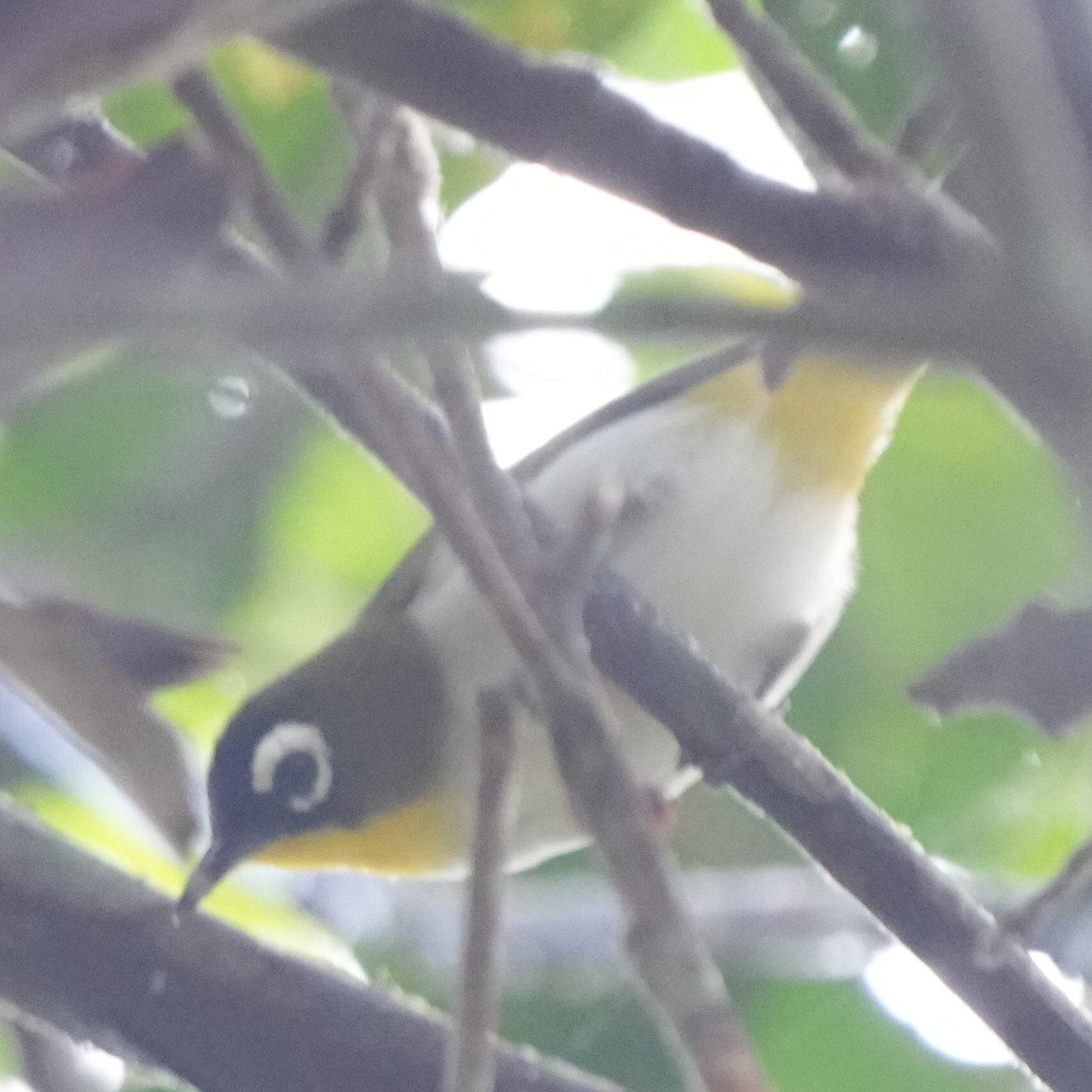

Conservation status
- Least Concern (IUCN 3.1)

Scientific classification
- Kingdom: Animalia
- Phylum: Chordata
- Class: Aves
- Order: Passeriformes
- Family: Zosteropidae
- Genus: Zosterops
- Species: Z. minor

Binomial name
- Zosterops minor A.B. Meyer, 1874

= Green-fronted white-eye =

Species of bird

The green-fronted white-eye (Zosterops minor) is a songbird species. It is closely related to the Old World babblers, and its family Zosteropidae might better be included in the Tiimalidae. Some sources include this species within Z. atrifrons, the black-crowned white-eye. The black-fronted white-eye (Z. chrysolaemus) was formerly considered a subspecies, and until it was split as a distinct species, the name "black-fronted white-eye" was also used for Z. minor.

It is found in New Guinea and offshore islands. Quite common, it is not considered a threatened species by the IUCN.
