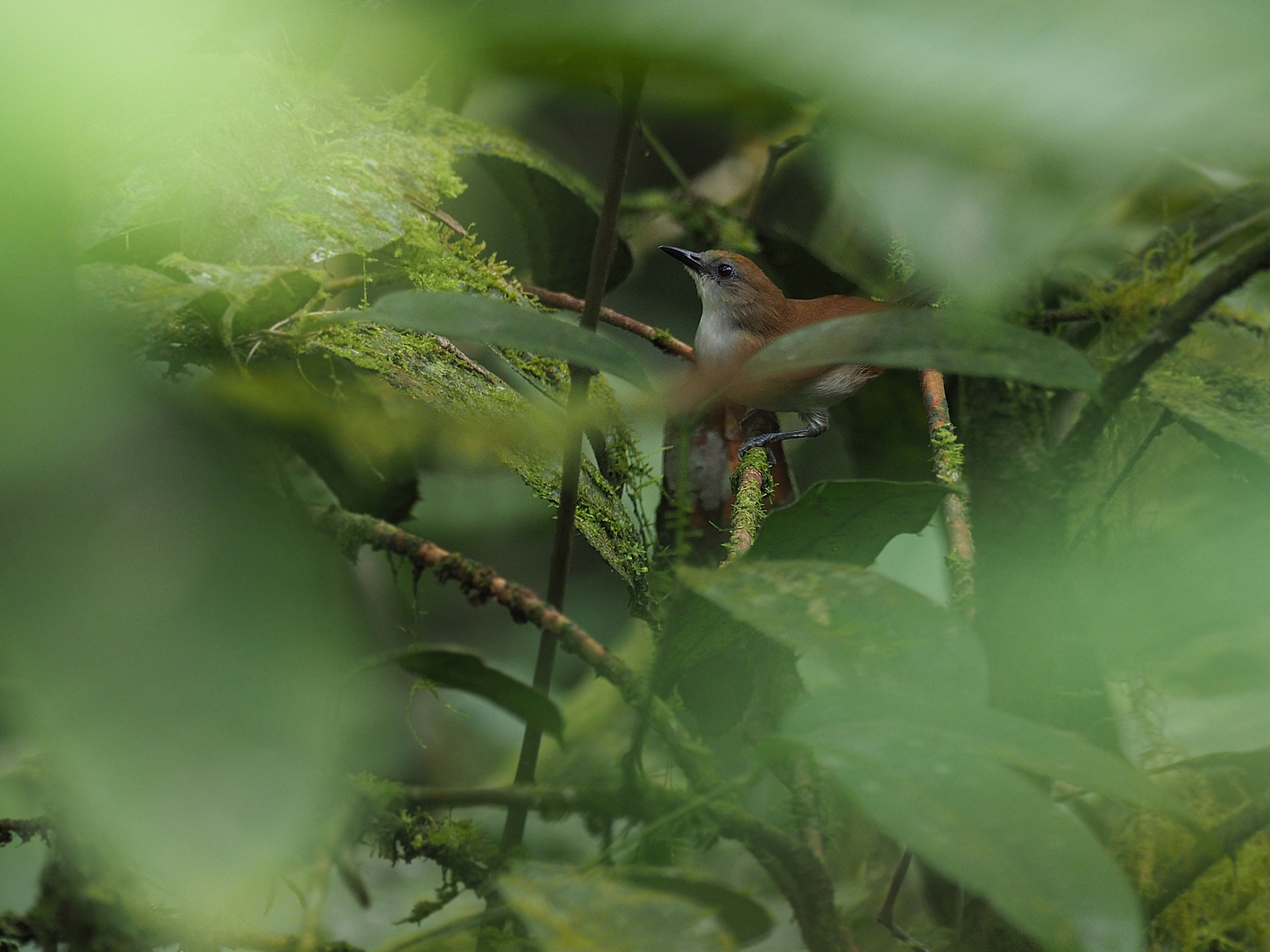

Conservation status
- Least Concern (IUCN 3.1)

Scientific classification
- Kingdom: Animalia
- Phylum: Chordata
- Class: Aves
- Order: Passeriformes
- Family: Zosteropidae
- Genus: Zosterops
- Species: Z. stalkeri

Binomial name
- Zosterops stalkeri Ogilvie-Grant, 1910

= Seram white-eye =

Species of bird

The Seram white-eye (Zosterops stalkeri) is a small passerine bird in the white-eye family. It is an endemic resident breeder in open woodland in Seram, Indonesia.

It was formerly considered conspecific with black-fronted white-eye, Zosterops minor, but work by Pamela C. Rasmussen and her colleagues showed that it is a separate species. The same research also confirmed the specific status of the Sangihe white-eye, Zosterops nehrkorni.

Compared to related taxa, the bill of Seram white-eye is paler, deeper, and broader at the base. Its eye-ring is narrow and broken at the front. The crown and sides of the head are black and the upperparts are dark bronze. The rump is a distinctive yellow-bronze. The sides of the breast and flanks are greyish-white, the undertail-coverts are orange-yellow, the thighs are whitish, and the uppertail is brownish-black.

The sexes are similar, but immatures have the throat greener and more diffuse, with more black mixed into the chin feathers.

Its song also differs from that of related species.

Though mainly insectivorous, the Seram white-eye will also eat nectar and fruits of various kinds.
