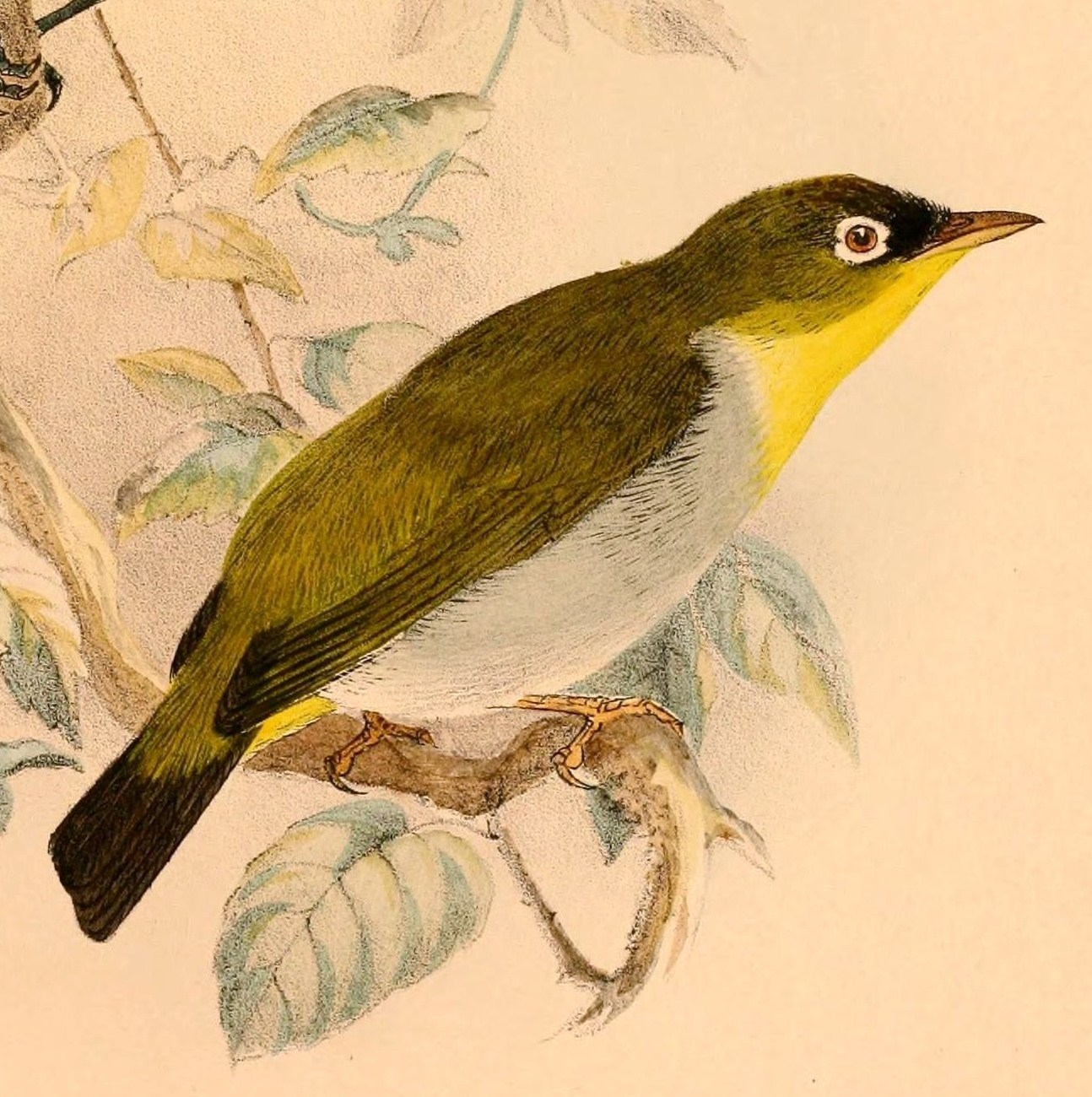

Conservation status
- Critically Endangered (IUCN 3.1)

Scientific classification
- Kingdom: Animalia
- Phylum: Chordata
- Class: Aves
- Order: Passeriformes
- Family: Zosteropidae
- Genus: Zosterops
- Species: Z. nehrkorni

Binomial name
- Zosterops nehrkorni Blasius, 1888

= Sangihe white-eye =

Species of bird

The Sangihe white-eye (Zosterops nehrkorni) is a species of bird in the white-eye family. It is endemic to Sangihe, Indonesia.

Its natural habitat is subtropical or tropical moist montane forests. It is threatened by habitat loss.

It was formerly considered conspecific with black-crowned white-eye (Zosterops atrifrons), but work by Pamela C. Rasmussen and her colleagues showed that it is a separate species. The same research also confirmed the specific status of the Seram white-eye, Zosterops stalkeri.
