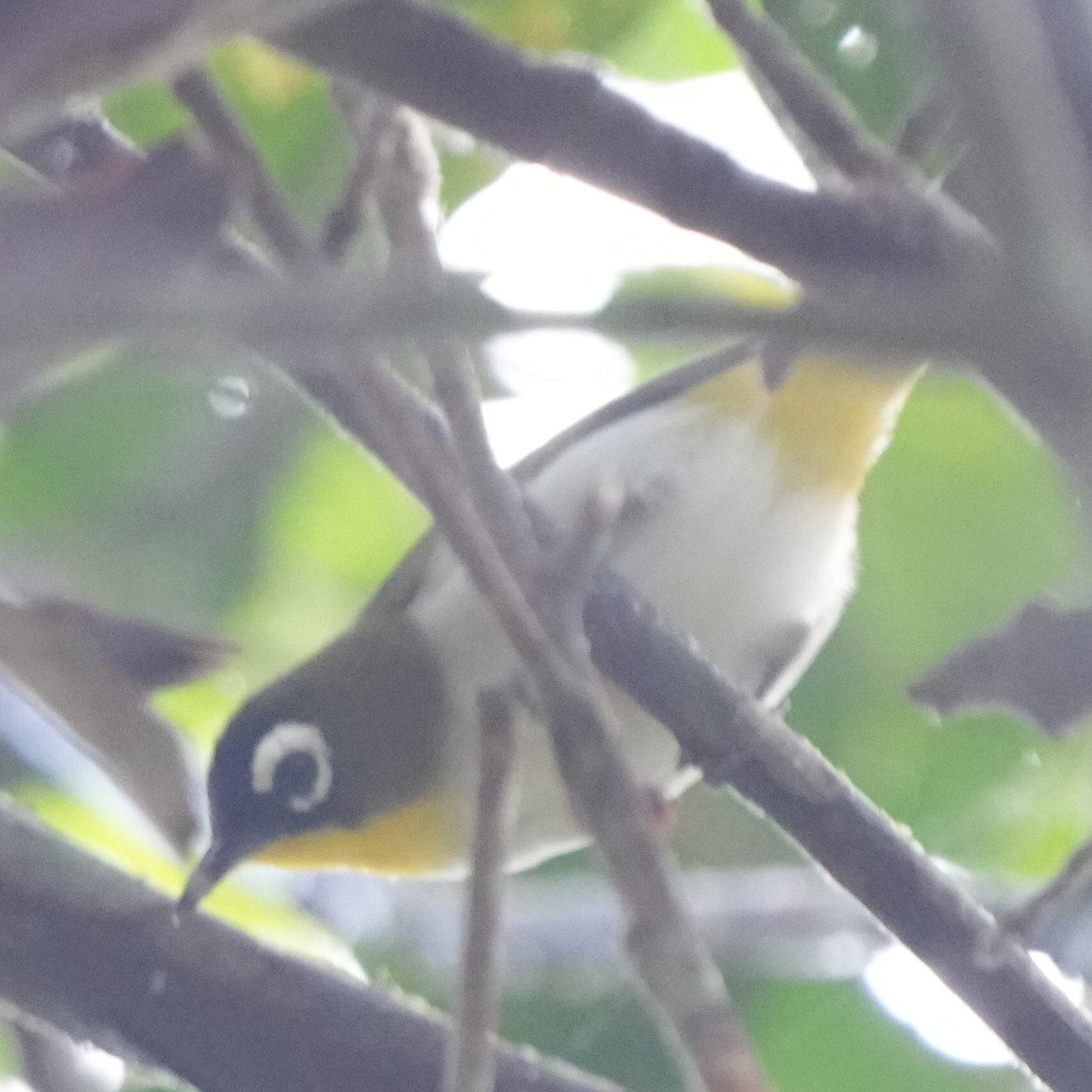

Conservation status
- Least Concern (IUCN 3.1)

Scientific classification
- Kingdom: Animalia
- Phylum: Chordata
- Class: Aves
- Order: Passeriformes
- Family: Zosteropidae
- Genus: Zosterops
- Species: Z. chrysolaemus

Binomial name
- Zosterops chrysolaemus Salvadori, 1876

= Black-fronted white-eye =

Species of bird

The black-fronted white-eye (Zosterops chrysolaemus) is a songbird species. It is closely related to the Old World babblers, and its family Zosteropidae might better be included in the Tiimalidae. The black-fronted white-eye was formerly considered a subspecies of the green-fronted white-eye (Zosterops minor), and until it was split as a distinct species, the name "black-fronted white-eye" was also used for Z. minor.

Study skin specimen

It is found in New Guinea. Quite common, it is considered of least concern by the IUCN.
