= CJW =

CJW can refer to:

- Chajawa, a train station in India; see List of railway stations in India#C
- CJW Medical Center, a hospital in Richmond, Virginia, U.S.; see List of hospitals in Virginia
- Championship Journalism Workshop, an annual journalism festival run by the Virginia High School League
- Melanopareiidae, a family of South American birds better known as the crescentchest, by Catalogue of Life identifier
