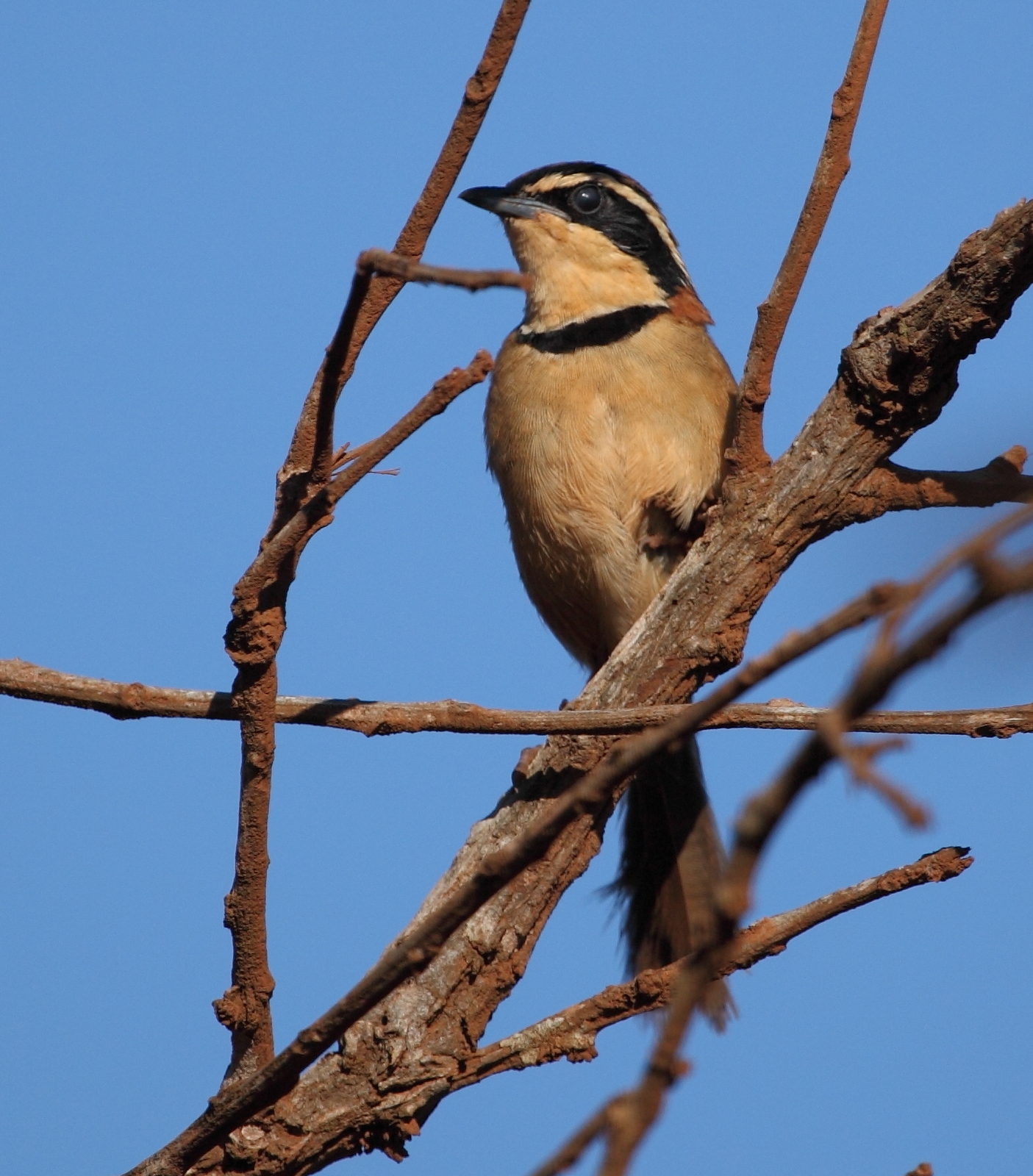
- at Chapada dos Guimarães, Mato Grosso State, Brazil

Conservation status
- Least Concern (IUCN 3.1)

Scientific classification
- Kingdom: Animalia
- Phylum: Chordata
- Class: Aves
- Order: Passeriformes
- Family: Melanopareiidae
- Genus: Melanopareia
- Species: M. torquata

Binomial name
- Melanopareia torquata (Wied-Neuwied, M, 1831)

= Collared crescentchest =

Species of bird

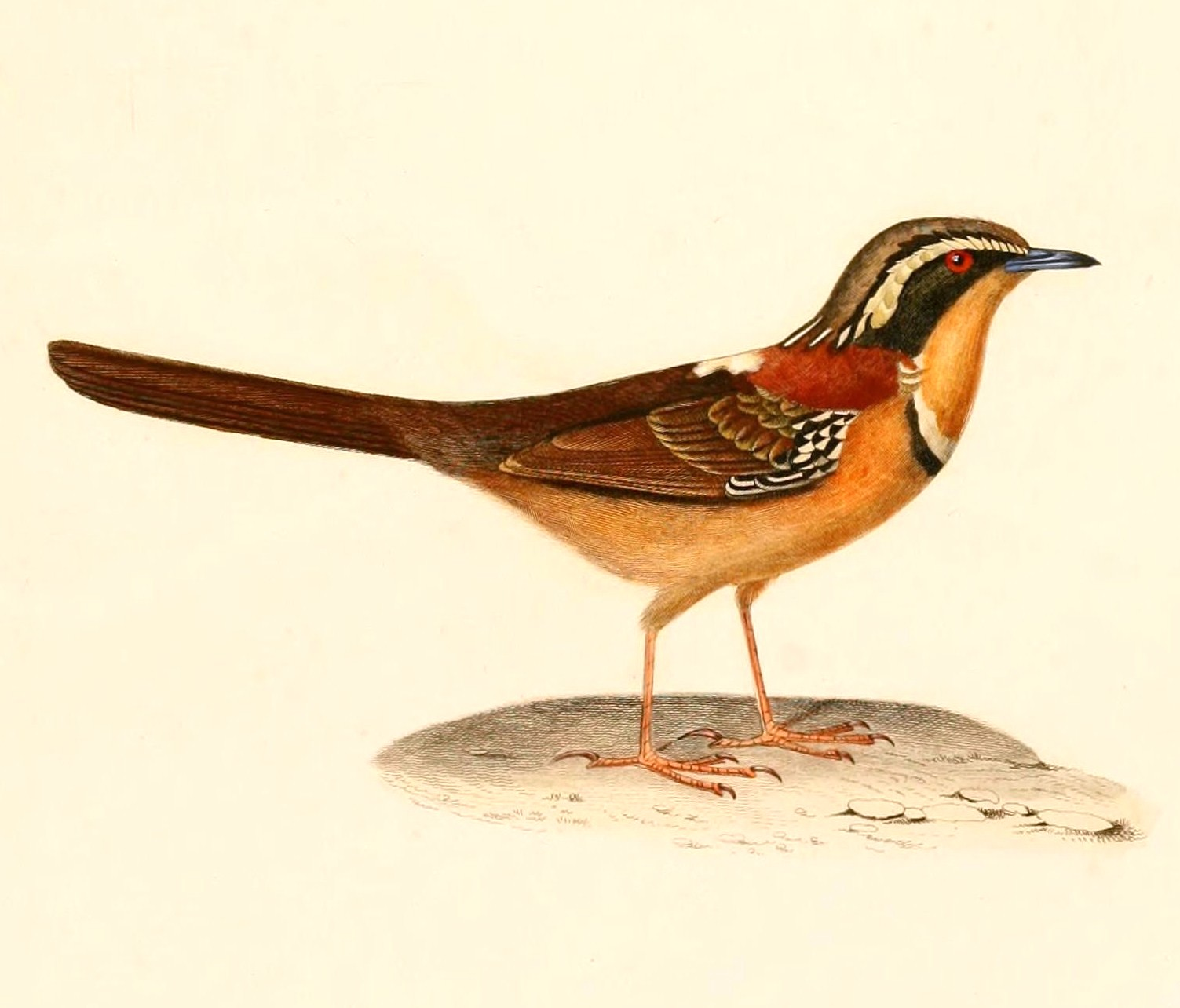
Melanopareia torquata d'Orbigny 1847

The collared crescentchest (Melanopareia torquata) is a species of suboscine passerine bird in the family Melanopareiidae. It is found in Bolivia, Brazil, and Paraguay.

== Taxonomy ==
The collared crescentchest was formally described in 1831 by the German naturalist Prince Maximilian of Wied-Neuwied under the binomial name Synallaxis torquatus. The specific epithet is Latin meaning "collared". Wied-Neuwied specified the locality as the "Campo Geral" of inner Brasil. This is the grassland on the border between the Brazilian states of Bahia and Minas Gerais. The collared crescentchest is now one of four crescentchests placed in the genus Melanopareia that was introduced in 1853 by the German naturalist Ludwig Reichenbach.

Three subspecies are recognised:

- M. t. torquata (Wied-Neuwied, M, 1831) – east Brazil
- M. t. rufescens Hellmayr, 1924 – central Brazil and northeast Paraguay
- M. t. bitorquata (d'Orbigny & Lafresnaye, 1837) – east Bolivia

The subspecies M. t. bitorquata has sometimes been treated as a separate species, the double-collared crescentchest.

The crescentchests (genus Melanopareia) were at one time included in family Rhinocryptidae, the tapaculos. A 2010 publication confirmed earlier work and formally created the present family Melanopareiidae.

== Description ==
The collared crescentchest is 14.5 cm (5.7 in) long. Two unsexed specimens of M. t. rufescens weighed 16.5 and 18.0 g (0.58 and 0.63 oz). The nominate subspecies' back and rump are brown and the underparts buff. The crown of the head is gray brown. It has a narrow white supercilium edged with black, a rufous "collar" on the back of the neck, and a black band across the breast. Subspecies M. t. rufescens is almost identical but its crown is reddish brown.

Both sexes of collared crescentchest sing year round, usually from atop a low shrub. The song is "a series of 3-6 loud, resonant 'chip' notes". Its call is "a penetrating churr".

== Distribution and habitat ==
The collared crescentchest is found primarily in central Brazil but also occurs in far northeastern Paraguay. It inhabits cerrado, a biome characterized by a mix of savannah and woodlands. It prefers wetter open areas and avoids disturbed areas. In elevation it ranges up to 1,400 m (4,600 ft).

== Behavior ==
=== Feeding ===
The collared crescentchest's diet has not been described but the species is assumed to be insectivorous.

=== Breeding ===
Little is known about the collared crescentchest's breeding phenology. Its nest is a globe of dry grass and leaves placed near the ground. Two eggs are laid and both sexes incubate them and care for nestlings.

== Status ==
The IUCN has assessed the collared crescentchest as being of Least Concern. "Despite widespread degradation of cerrado habitat, the population of Collared Crescentchest is believed to be relatively stable throughout its large range."
