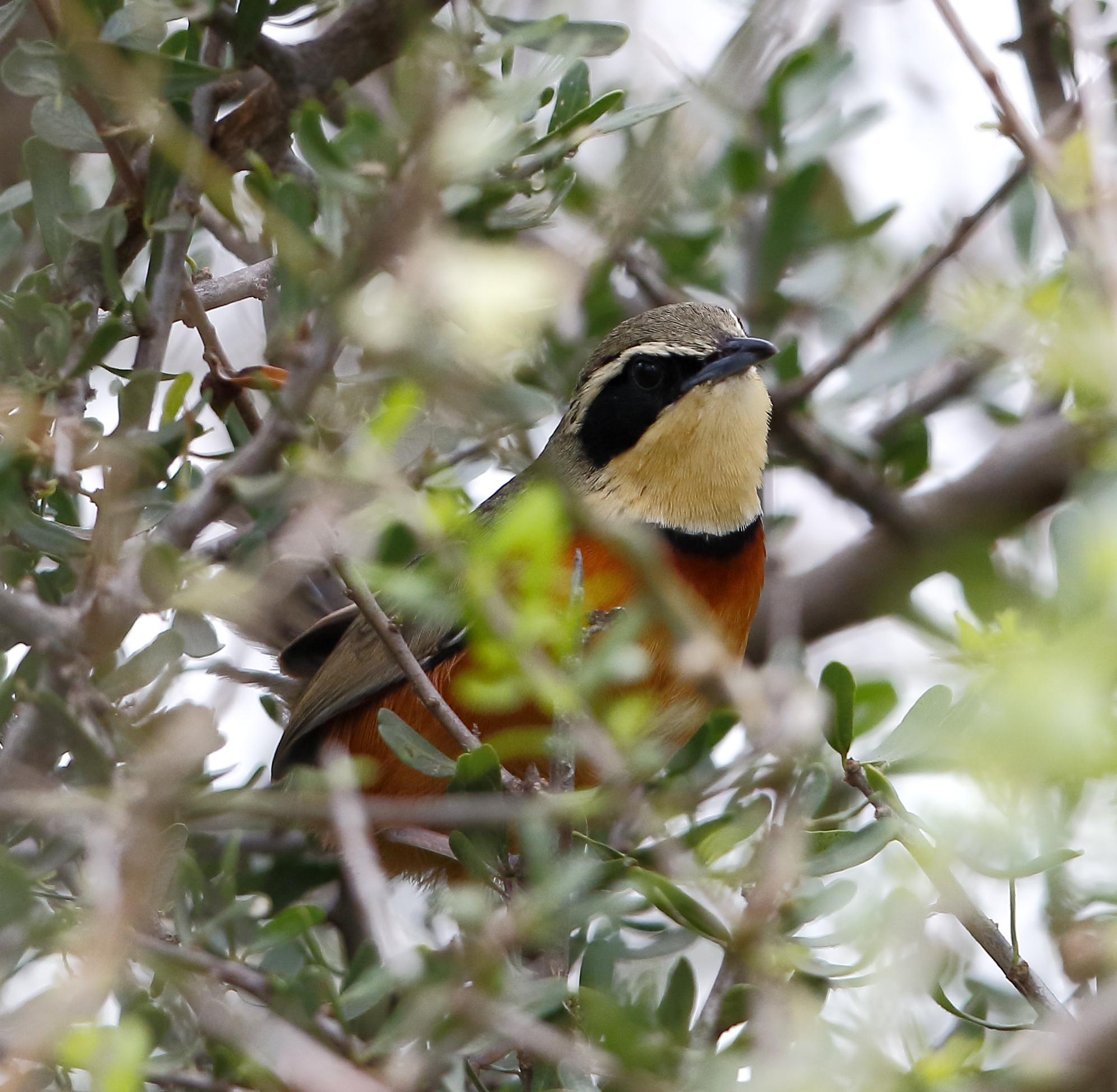

Conservation status
- Least Concern (IUCN 3.1)

Scientific classification
- Kingdom: Animalia
- Phylum: Chordata
- Class: Aves
- Order: Passeriformes
- Family: Melanopareiidae
- Genus: Melanopareia
- Species: M. maximiliani

Binomial name
- Melanopareia maximiliani (D'Orbigny, 1838)

= Olive-crowned crescentchest =

Species of bird

The olive-crowned crescentchest (Melanopareia maximiliani) is a species of bird in the family Melanopareiidae. It is found in Argentina, Bolivia, and Paraguay.

== Taxonomy ==
The olive-crowned crescentchest was formally described in 1838 by the French naturalists Alcide d'Orbigny under the binomial name Synallaxis maximiliani based on a specimen that had been collected at an altitude of 2,000 m (6,600 ft) at the summit of Mount Biscachal, near the village of Carcuata, Yungas, Bolivia. The specific epithet was chosen to honour the German naturalist Prince Maximilian of Wied-Neuwied. The crescentchests (genus Melanopareia) were previously included in the family Rhinocryptidae, the tapaculos. A 2010 publication confirmed earlier work and created their present genus.

Three subspecies are recognised:

- M. m. maximiliani (d'Orbigny, 1838) – Yungas of western Bolivia (La Paz)
- M. m. argentina (Hellmayr, 1907) – central Bolivia to northwestern Argentina (western Córdoba and northern San Luis)
- M. m. pallida Nores & Yzurieta, 1980 – southeastern Bolivia and Chaco Basin of western Paraguay and northern Argentina (from eastern Formosa southward to Córdoba)

The subspecies M. m. pallida has been suggested as a separate species due to vocal differences. In addition, a subpopulation of M. m. pallida might be an undescribed taxon.

== Description ==
The olive-crowned crescentchest is 15 cm (5.9 in) long. Males weigh 17.1 to 18.0 g (0.60 to 0.63 oz), one female weighed 16.7 g (0.59 oz), and unsexed specimens weighed 16.9 to 18.2 g (0.60 to 0.64 oz). The nominate subspecies' crown and upperparts are olive-brown, the throat deep buff, and the chest and belly ochraceous. It has a narrow buff supercilium with a black mask below and a black crescent and chesnut band between the throat and chest. M. m. argentina is similar but has paler underparts. M. m. pallida is paler still, its throat is more cinnamon than buff, and the facial mask is a lighter black.

== Distribution and habitat ==
The nominate subspecies of olive-crowned crescentchest is found in La Paz Department of western Bolivia. M. m. argentina is found from central Bolivia to northwestern Argentina. M. m. pallida is found in southeastern Bolivia, western Paraguay, and northern Argentina. The species generally inhabits dry scrub and grassy areas with small bushes, but M. m. pallida also frequents sawgrass in the Chaco Basin. It ranges in elevation mostly from 1,700 to 2,950 m (5,580 to 9,680 ft) but is found as low as 1,200 m (3,900 ft) in Argentina.

== Behavior ==
=== Feeding ===
The olive-crowned crescentchest usually forages alone, but sometimes in pairs, by hopping through dense cover on or near the ground. Its diet has not been recorded.

=== Breeding ===
In Argentina the olive-crowned crescentchest breeds from September to December; an active nest was found in October in central Bolivia. Two nests of M. m. pallida were cups of vegetable fiber and palm leaves; they were hidden not far above the ground. One nest of M. m. argentina was a tunnel lined with grass. The species' clutch is two or three eggs.

=== Vocalization ===
The nominate olive-crowned crescentchest and M. m. argentina have two songs, one described as "chuck" notes and the other as "chi" notes . The song of M. m. pallida is faster . The species' call is described as "chit chuck" .

== Status ==
The IUCN has assessed the olive-crowned crescentchest as being of Least Concern. It is locally fairly common and in Argentina occurs in several protected areas.
