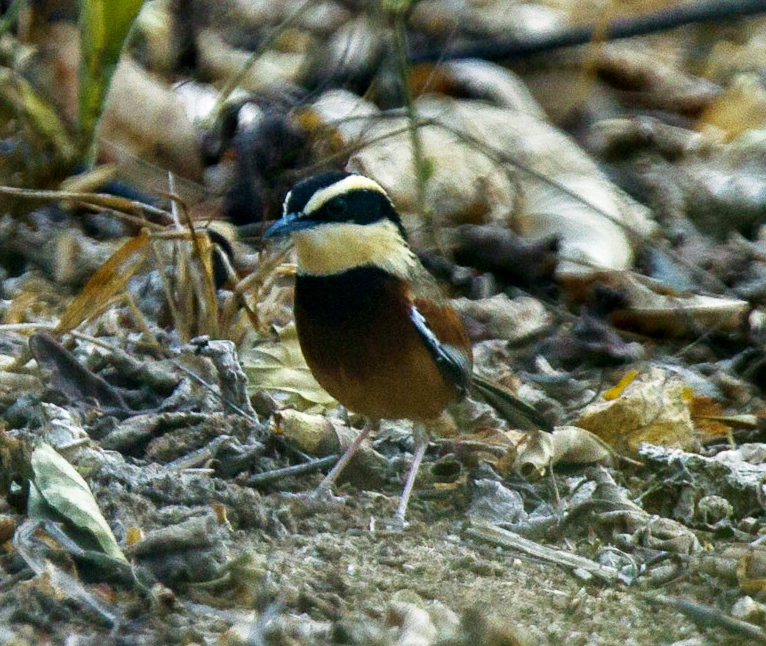

Conservation status
- Least Concern (IUCN 3.1)

Scientific classification
- Kingdom: Animalia
- Phylum: Chordata
- Class: Aves
- Order: Passeriformes
- Family: Melanopareiidae
- Genus: Melanopareia
- Species: M. elegans

Binomial name
- Melanopareia elegans (Lesson, 1844)

= Elegant crescentchest =

Species of bird

The elegant crescentchest (Melanopareia elegans) is a species of bird in the family Melanopareiidae. It is found in Ecuador and Peru.

== Taxonomy and systematics ==
The crescentchests (genus Melanopareia) were previously included in family Rhinocryptidae, the tapaculos. A 2010 publication confirmed earlier work and created their present genus. The elegant crescentchest and the Marañón crescentchest (Melanopareia maranonica) might form a superspecies. Two subspecies of elegant crescentchest are recognized, the nominate Melanopareia elegans elegans and M. e. paucalensis.

== Description ==
The elegant crescentchest is 14.5 cm (5.7 in) long. Males weigh 16.0 to 20.2 g (0.56 to 0.71 oz) and females 15.5 to 19.0 g (0.55 to 0.67 oz) Males of both subspecies have a black crown, nape, and mask and a creamy supercilium. The back and rump are olive-brown. Its throat is white or pale buff that is darker around the margins and a black "bib" is below it. The upper chest is dark chestnut fading to tawny on the flanks and belly. The nominate female is similar, but the crown is sooty and there is no dark chestnut on the chest. The female M. e. paucalensis is like the nominate except that its crown is the same olive-brown as the back.

== Distribution and habitat ==
The elegant crescentchest is found discontinuously along the coast of Ecuador from Manabí Province south into Peru as far south as the Department of La Libertad. The nominate is in Ecuador and M. e. paucalensis is in Peru, and birds in far southern Ecuador might be intergrades between the two subspecies. Its principal habitat is scrub and undergrowth in semi-arid woodland; it can also be found in more humid disturbed areas. In Ecuador it ranges from near sea level usually to 2,000 m (6,600 ft) and locally to 2,400 m (7,900 ft). It Peru it reaches only as high as 1,700 m (5,600 ft).

== Behavior ==
=== Feeding ===
The elegant crescentchest's diet has not been reported. It forages alone by hopping through dense cover on and near the ground.

=== Breeding ===
Almost nothing is known about the elegant crescentchest's breeding phenology. Three nests have been described. They were constructed of dry strips of cactus and weeds, were enclosed with a side entrance, and hidden on the ground.

=== Vocalization ===
The elegant crescentchest's song is "a series of..."chuck" notes" . Its scold call is "a dry penetrating churr" .

== Status ==
The IUCN has assessed the elegant crescentchest as being of Least Concern. Though it has a somewhat restricted range, it occurs in several protected areas and tolerates habitat disturbance.
