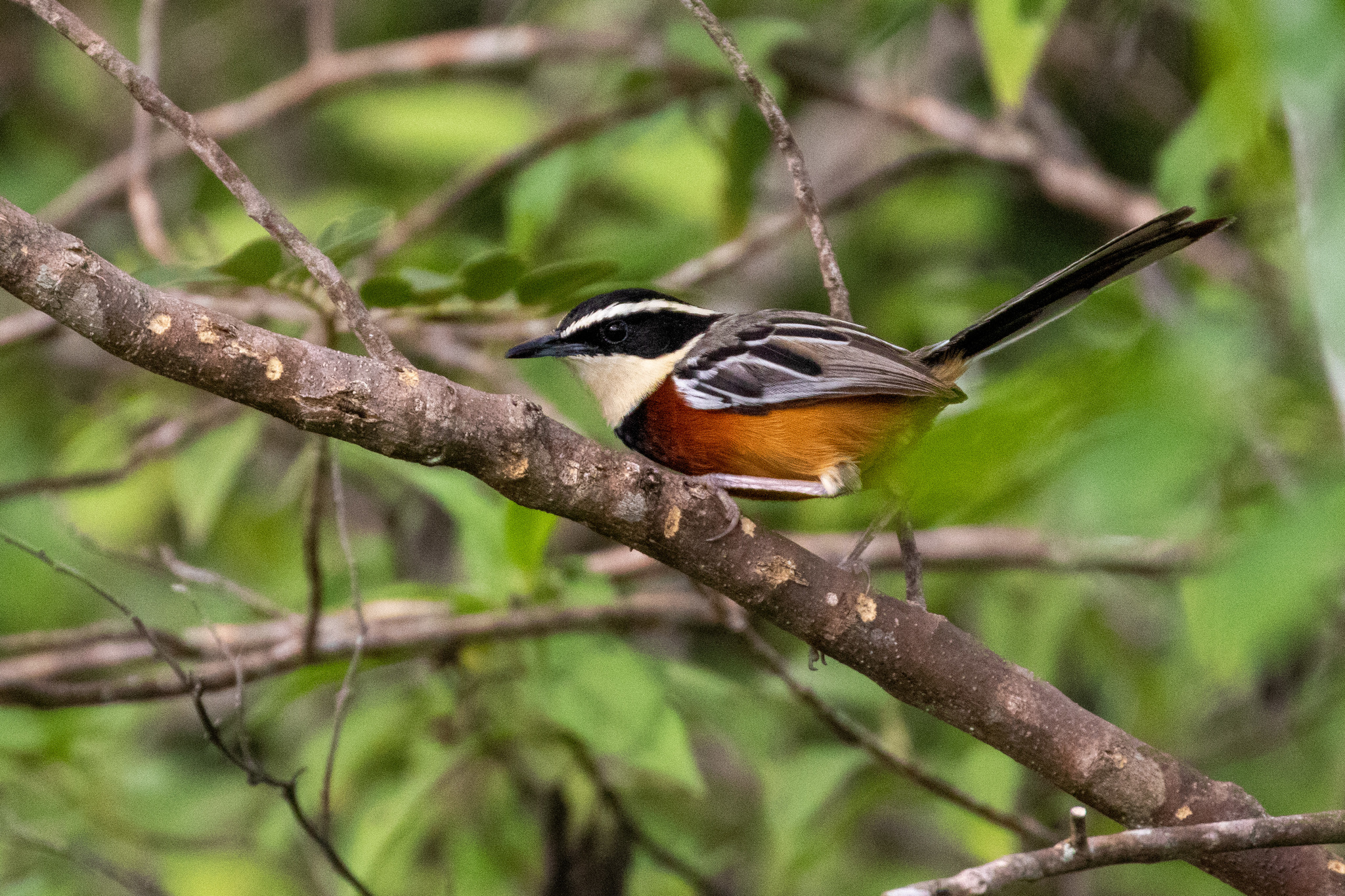

Conservation status
- Least Concern (IUCN 3.1)

Scientific classification
- Kingdom: Animalia
- Phylum: Chordata
- Class: Aves
- Order: Passeriformes
- Family: Melanopareiidae
- Genus: Melanopareia
- Species: M. maranonica

Binomial name
- Melanopareia maranonica Chapman, 1924

= Marañón crescentchest =

Species of bird

The Marañón crescentchest (Melanopareia maranonica) is a species of bird in the family Melanopareiidae. It is found in southern Ecuador and northern Peru.

== Taxonomy and systematics ==
The crescentchests (genus Melanopareia) were previously included in family Rhinocryptidae, the tapaculos. A 2010 publication confirmed earlier work and created their present genus. The Marañón crescentchest is monotypic. It and the elegant crescentchest (Melanopareia elegans) might form a superspecies.

== Description ==
The Marañón crescentchest is 16 cm (6.3 in) long. A female specimen weighed 23 g (0.81 oz). The male's crown and nape are black and its back and rump grayish olive. The chin and throat are white or light buff, and the throat is bordered on its sides and bottom with darker buff. It has broad black band just below the throat that merges into a chestnut breast; below the breast it is tawny. The female has a similar pattern. However, the black band is narrower and the underparts from that band to the tail are an ochraceous tawny.

== Distribution and habitat ==
The Marañón crescentchest has a very small range; it is found in the valley of the Marañón River and its tributaries in northern Peru and slightly into adjacent Ecuador. In elevation it occurs from 200 to 700 m (660 to 2,300 ft). It inhabits tropical deciduous forest and dry scrub.

== Behavior ==
Marañón crescentchest
Marañón crescentchest call

The Marañón crescentchest's diet has not been described; it is presumed to be insects and perhaps seeds and other vegetable matter. Nothing is known about the species' breeding phenology, but its nest is assumed to be a cup like those of other Melanopareia species.

The Marañón crescentchest's song is a "series of rich notes: tu tu-tu-tu'tu'tu'tu'tu'tu'tu'tu" . It has a variety of calls .

== Status ==
The IUCN has assessed the Marañón crescentchest as Least Concern. It is uncommon in its small range and the population is believed to be declining, though neither of these parameters meet the criteria for a Vulnerable species.
