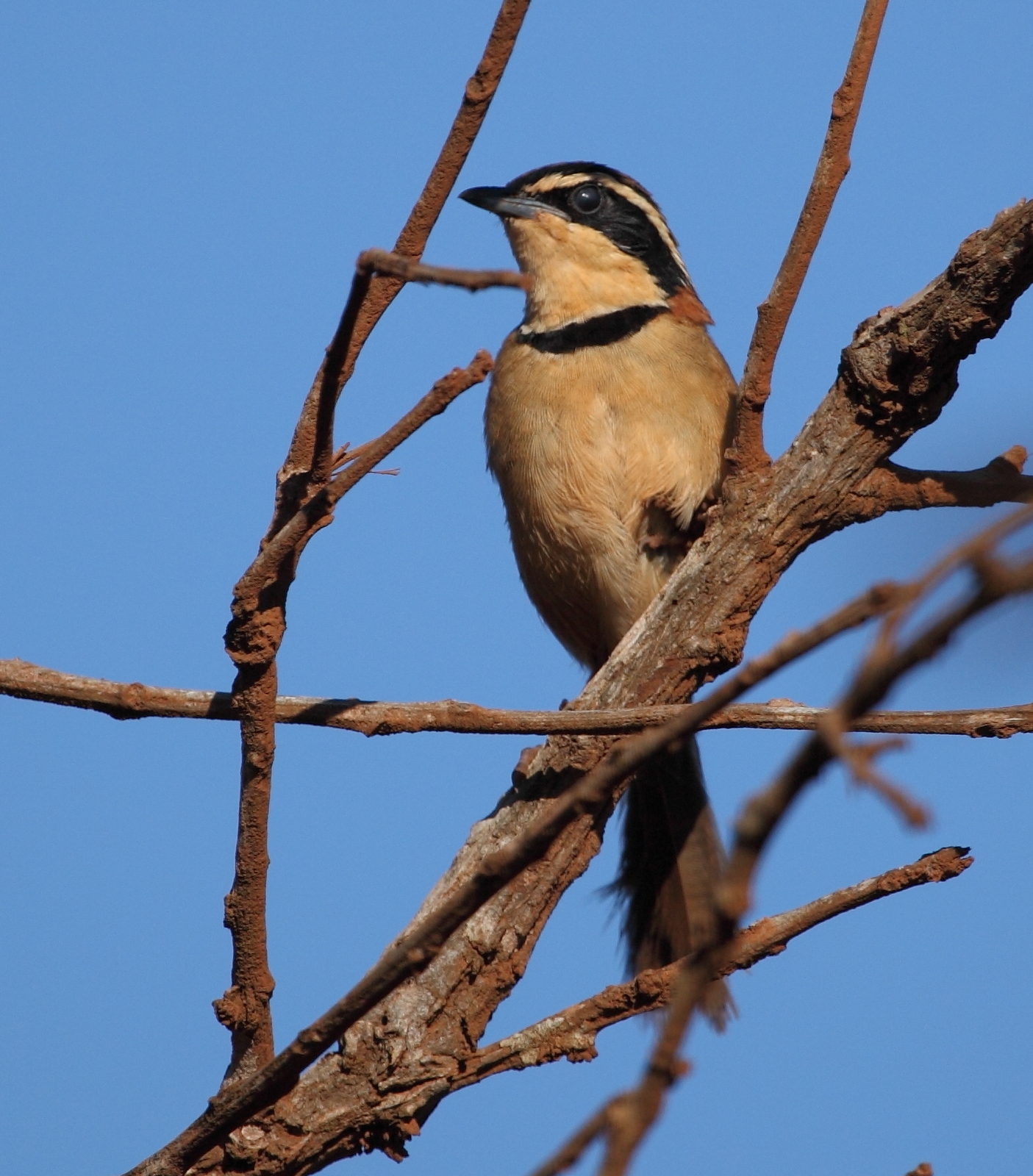
- Collared crescentchest (Melanopareia torquata)

Scientific classification
- Kingdom: Animalia
- Phylum: Chordata
- Class: Aves
- Order: Passeriformes
- Parvorder: Furnariida
- Family: Melanopareiidae; Ericson et al 2010
- Genus: Melanopareia; Reichenbach, 1853

Type species
- Synallaxis maximiliani d'Orbigny, 1835

Species
- 4, see text

= Crescentchest =

Melanopareia

Genus of birds

The crescentchests are a genus, Melanopareia, of suboscine passerine birds from South America. The genus has long been placed with the tapaculos in the family Rhinocryptidae. Their placement there has been questioned and in 2007 the genus was placed in its own family, Melanopareiidae, by the South American Classification Committee. Subsequently, the family was accepted by the International Ornithological Congress Bird List and the Clements Checklist. The family Melanopareiidae was formally erected in 2009.

== Taxonomy ==
The genus Melanopareia was introduced in 1853 by the German naturalist Ludwig Reichenbach. He listed two species in the genus but did not specify the type; in 1855 the English zoologist George Gray selected Synallaxis maximiliani D'Orbigny, (olive-crowned crescentchest) as the type species. The genus name combines the Ancient Greek μελας/melas, μελανος/melanos meaning "black" with παρηιον/parēion meaning "cheek".

The crescentchests range in length from 14 to 16 cm (5.5–6.3 in), in weight from 16 to 23 g (0.56–0.81 oz) and have relatively long tails compared to the tapaculos. The plumage is striking with a distinctive band across the chest that gives the group their name.

The crescentchests are birds of arid scrub. They generally forage on the ground, but their diet has not yet been recorded. Two species, the collared crescentchest and olive-crowned crescentchest, are widely distributed across central and southern Brazil, Bolivia, Paraguay and northern Argentina. The other two species, the elegant crescentchest and Marañón crescentchest, have a more restricted distribution in Peru and Ecuador.

Little is known about the behaviour of the crescentchests. The only species about which anything is known about the breeding behaviour is the olive-crowned crescentchest. That species is a seasonal breeder. The nest of that species is a 15 cm high cup made of vegetable fibres and palm fronds, hidden in grasses or low shrubs close to the ground. The clutch size is two to three eggs, the eggs are white with blotches or black spots.

No species of crescentchest is considered by the IUCN to be threatened by human activities, but the Marañón crescentchest is listed as near threatened. Although the species is apparently tolerant of some disturbance it has a tiny global range and is uncommon even within that range.

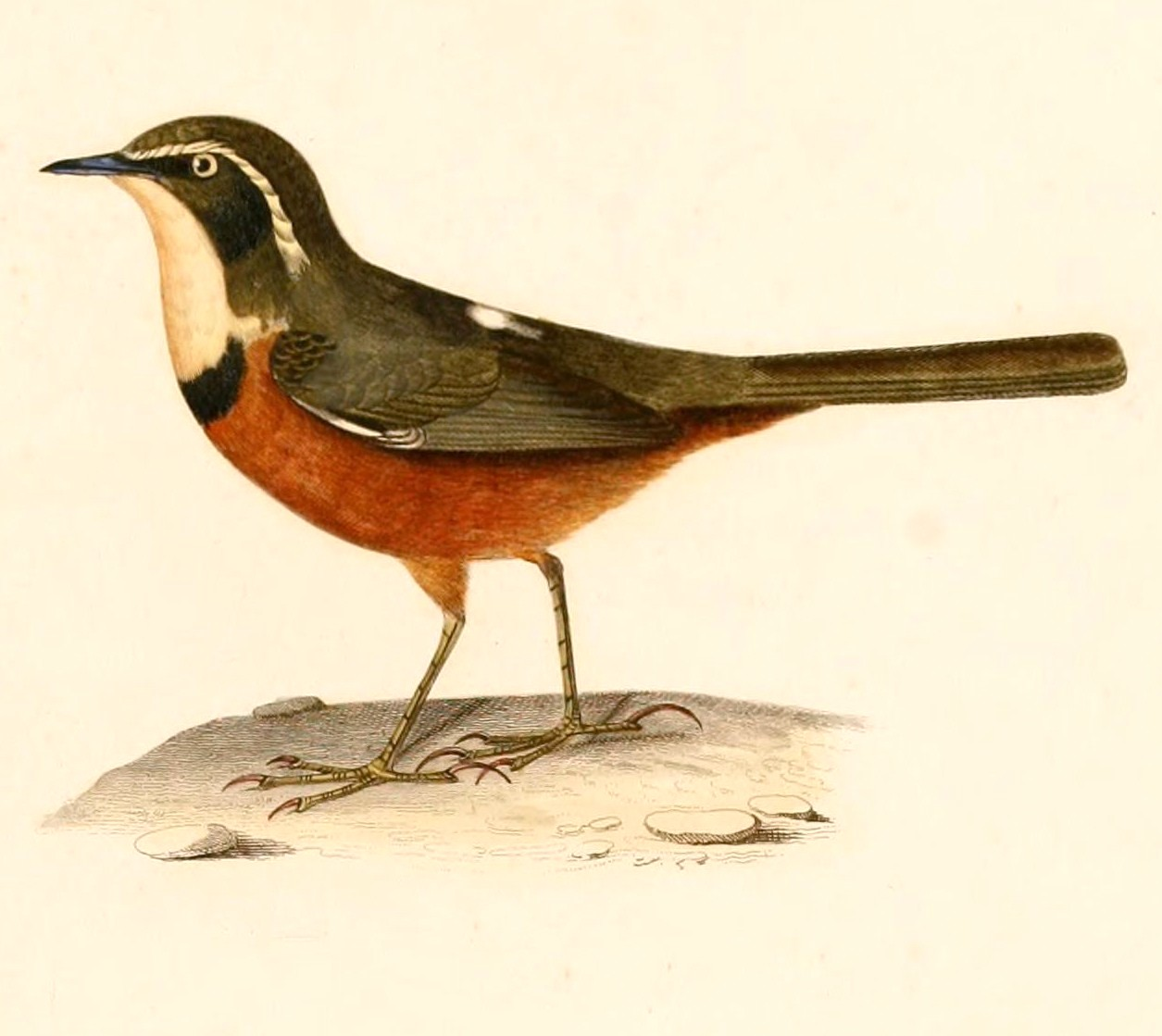
Melanopareia maximiliani d'Orbigny, 1847

== Species ==
The genus contains the following four species:

Genus Melanopareia – Reichenbach, 1853 – four species
Common name	Scientific name and subspecies	Range	Size and ecology	IUCN status and estimated population
Collared crescentchest	Melanopareia torquata (Wied, 1831) Three subspecies: M. t. torquata.; M. t. rufescens.; M. t. bitorquata.	northeastern Bolivia, central Brazil, and northern Paraguay.	Size: Habitat: Diet:	LC
Olive-crowned crescentchest	Melanopareia maximiliani (D'Orbigny, 1835) Three subspecies: M. m. maximiliani.; M. m. argentina.; M. m. pallida.	Argentina, Bolivia and Paraguay.	Size: Habitat: Diet:	LC
Marañón crescentchest	Melanopareia maranonica Chapman, 1924	southern Ecuador and northern Peru.	Size: Habitat: Diet:	LC
Elegant crescentchest	Melanopareia elegans (Lesson, 1844) Two subspecies: M. e. elegans; M. e. paucalensis.	Ecuador and Peru.	Size: Habitat: Diet:	LC
