= Tucuman pygmy-owl =

Conservation status
- Least Concern (IUCN 3.1)

Scientific classification
- Kingdom: Animalia
- Phylum: Chordata
- Class: Aves
- Order: Strigiformes
- Family: Strigidae
- Genus: Glaucidium
- Species: G. tucumanum

Binomial name
- Glaucidium tucumanum (Chapman, 1922)

Species of bird

The Tucuman pygmy-owl (Glaucidium tucumanum) is a small South American owl.

It is 16 to 17.5 cm (6.3–7 in.) in length and weighs 55 to 60 grams (1.9-2.1 oz.)

Its range is the Gran Chaco region of Bolivia, Paraguay, and Argentina south to Tucumán province and the northern part of Córdoba province. It lives in arid and semi-arid thorny and bushy habitats from 500 meters up to 1500 meters, at some places 1800 meters, above sea level.

Some authorities consider it a subspecies of the ferruginous pygmy-owl, in which case it is called Glaucidium brasilianum pallens. For example, the IUCN no longer recognizes it as a full species. Among authorities that do consider it a full species are the 2007 Clements Checklist of Birds of the World and the Handbook of the Birds of the World.
