= List of honeyeaters =

Honeyeaters and the Australian chats make up the family Meliphagidae. They are a large and diverse family of small to medium-sized birds most common in Australia and New Guinea, but also found in New Zealand, the Pacific islands as far east as Samoa and Tonga, and the islands to the north and west of New Guinea known as Wallacea.

Family: Meliphagidae

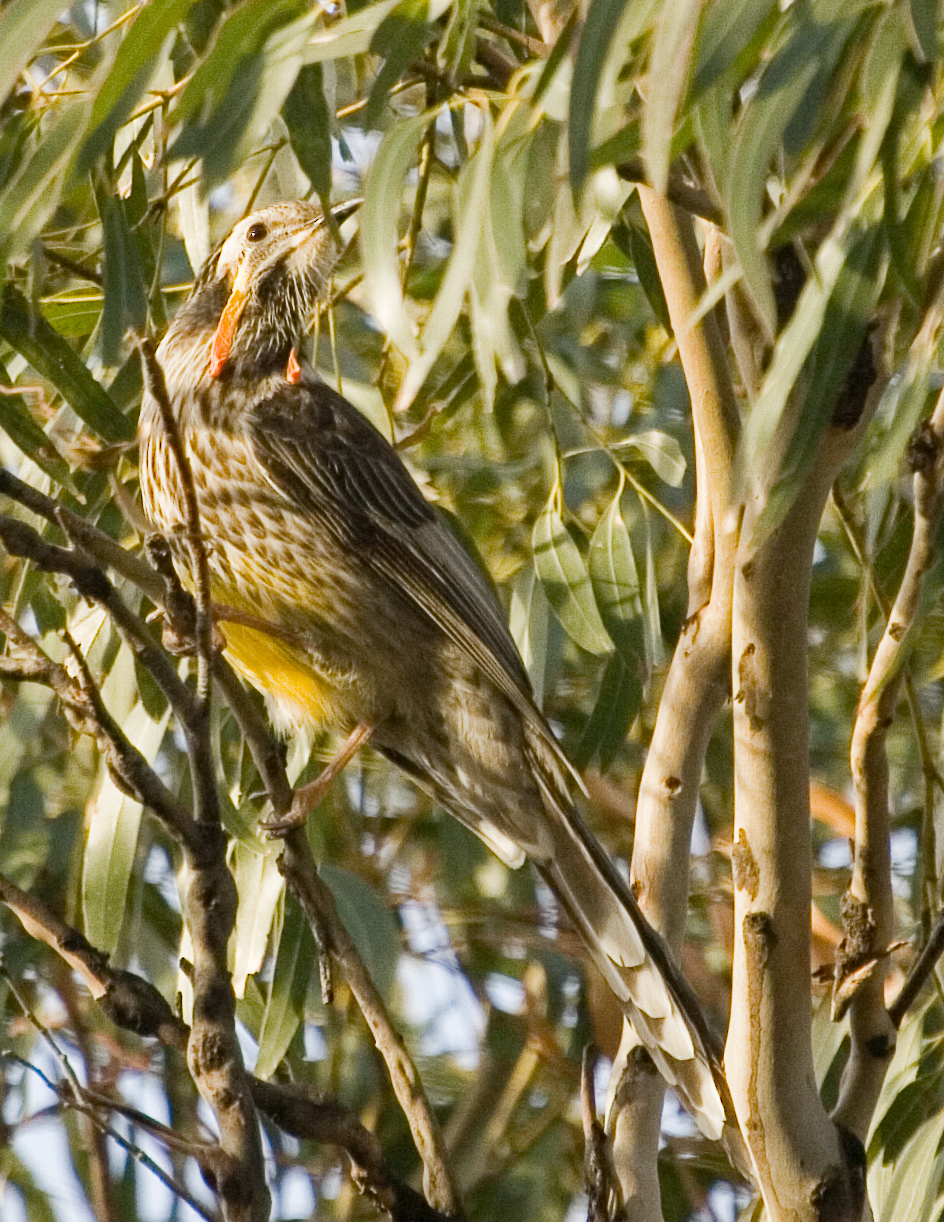
Yellow wattlebird (Anthochaera paradoxa)

- Sugomel
  - Black honeyeater, Sugomel nigrum (Gould, 1838)
- Myzomela
  - Drab myzomela, Myzomela blasii (Salvadori, 1882) (southern Moluccan Islands of Ceram and Ambon)
  - White-chinned myzomela, Myzomela albigula Hartert, EJO, 1898 (southeast Papua New Guinea)
  - Ruby-throated myzomela, Myzomela eques (Lesson, RP & Garnot, 1827) (New Guinea and the islands of Waigeo, Salawati, Misool, New Britain, and Umboi)
  - Dusky honeyeater, Myzomela obscura Gould, 1843 (northern Moluccas, New Guinea, Aru Islands, northern and northeastern Australia, and southwestern Lesser Sunda Islands)
  - Red myzomela, Myzomela cruentata Meyer, AB, 1874 (New Guinea and the Bismarck Archipelago)
  - Papuan black myzomela, Myzomela nigrita Gray, GR, 1858 (New Guinea, Aru Islands and Waigeo island)
  - New Ireland myzomela, Myzomela pulchella Salvadori, 1891 (New Ireland and the eastern Bismarck Archipelago)
  - Mountain myzomela, Myzomela adolphinae Salvadori, 1876 (New Guinea)
  - Wetar myzomela, Myzomela kuehni Rothschild, 1903 (central Lesser Sunda Islands)
  - Sumba myzomela, Myzomela dammermani Siebers, 1928 (southwestern Lesser Sunda Islands)
  - Red-headed myzomela, Myzomela erythrocephala Gould, 1840 (southern New Guinea, Aru Islands, and northern Australia)
  - Sulawesi myzomela, Myzomela chloroptera Walden, 1872 (Sulawesi and northern Moluccas)
  - Wakolo myzomela, Myzomela wakoloensis Forbes, HO, 1883 (southern Moluccas)
  - Banda myzomela, Myzomela boiei (Müller, S, 1843) (Lesser Sunda Islands, Banda Islands, and Tanimbar Islands)
  - Taliabu myzomela, Myzomela wahe Rheindt, Prawiradilaga, Ashari, Suparno & Wu, MY, 2020 (the island of Taliabu)
  - Scarlet myzomela, Myzomela sanguinolenta (Latham, 1801) (eastern Australia)
  - New Caledonian myzomela, Myzomela caledonica Forbes, WA, 1879 (new Caledonia)
  - Micronesian myzomela, Myzomela rubrata (Mariana Islands, Palau, and Caroline Islands)
  - Cardinal myzomela, Myzomela cardinalis (Gmelin, JF, 1788) (southeastern Solomon Islands, Vanuatu, and Samoa)
  - Rotuma myzomela, Myzomela chermesina Gray, GR, 1846 (northwestern Fiji)
  - Sclater's myzomela, Myzomela sclateri Forbes, WA, 1879 (small islands off northeast coast of New Guinea and New Britain)
  - Bismarck black myzomela, Myzomela pammelaena Sclater, PL, 1877 (Bismarck Archipelago)
  - Red-capped myzomela, Myzomela lafargei Pucheran, 1853 (Solomon Islands)
  - Crimson-rumped myzomela, Myzomela eichhorni Rothschild & Hartert, EJO, 1901 (central Solomon Islands)
  - Black-headed myzomela, Myzomela melanocephala (Ramsay, EP, 1879) (Solomon Islands)
  - Red-vested myzomela, Myzomela malaitae Mayr, 1931 (southeastern Solomon Islands)
  - Sooty myzomela, Myzomela tristrami Ramsay, EP, 1881 (southern Solomon Islands)
  - Orange-breasted myzomela, Myzomela jugularis Peale, 1849 (Fiji)
  - Black-bellied myzomela, Myzomela erythromelas Salvadori, 1881 (Bismarck Archipelago)
  - Black-breasted myzomela, Myzomela vulnerata (Müller, S, 1843) (Lesser Sunda Islands)
  - Red-collared myzomela, Myzomela rosenbergii Schlegel, 1871 (New Guinea)
- Gliciphila
  - Tawny-crowned honeyeater, Gliciphila melanops (Latham, 1801)
- Glycichaera
  - Green-backed honeyeater, Glycichaera fallax Salvadori, 1878 (Aru Islands, Waigeo and Misool island, New Guinea, northeastern Australia)
- Ptiloprora
  - Leaden honeyeater, Ptiloprora plumbea (Salvadori, 1895)
  - Rufous-sided honeyeater, Ptiloprora erythropleura (Salvadori, 1876)
  - Rufous-backed honeyeater, Ptiloprora guisei (De Vis, 1894)
  - Mayr's honeyeater, Ptiloprora mayri Hartert, EJO, 1930
  - Yellowish-streaked honeyeater, Ptiloprora meekiana (Rothschild & Hartert, EJO, 1907)
  - Grey-streaked honeyeater, Ptiloprora perstriata (De Vis, 1898)
- Acanthorhynchus
  - Eastern spinebill, Acanthorhynchus tenuirostris (Latham, 1801)
  - Western spinebill, Acanthorhynchus superciliosus Gould, 1837
- Certhionyx
  - Pied honeyeater, Certhionyx variegatus Lesson, RP, 1830 (western central Australia)
- Prosthemadera
  - Tūī or parson bird. Prosthemadera novaeseelandiae (Gmelin, JF, 1788)
- Anthornis
  - New Zealand bellbird, Anthornis melanura (Sparrman, 1786)
- Pycnopygius
  - Plain honeyeater, Pycnopygius ixoides (Salvadori, 1878)
  - Marbled honeyeater, Pycnopygius cinereus (Sclater, PL, 1874)
  - Streak-headed honeyeater, Pycnopygius stictocephalus (Salvadori, 1876)
- Cissomela
  - Banded honeyeater, Cissomela pectoralis (Gould, 1841)
- Lichmera
  - Olive honeyeater, Lichmera argentauris (Finsch, 1871) (Moluccas and western islands of Papua New Guinea)
  - Indonesian honeyeater, Lichmera (indistincta) limbata (Lesser Sunda Islands)
  - Brown honeyeater, Lichmera indistincta (Vigors & Horsfield, 1827) (Aru Islands, central-southern New Guinea, Australia)
  - Dark-brown honeyeater, Lichmera incana (Latham, 1790) (New Caledonia, Loyalty Islands, and Vanuatu)
  - Scaly-breasted honeyeater, Lichmera squamata (Salvadori, 1878) (Lesser Sunda Islands and Kai Island)
  - Scaly-crowned honeyeater, Lichmera lombokia (Mathews, 1926) (west-central Lesser Sunda Islands)
  - Silver-eared honeyeater, Lichmera alboauricularis (Ramsay, EP, 1878) (north-central and southeastern New Guinea)
  - Buru honeyeater, Lichmera deningeri (Stresemann, 1912) (Buru)
  - Seram honeyeater, Lichmera monticola (Stresemann, 1912) (Seram)
  - Flame-eared honeyeater, Lichmera flavicans (Vieillot, 1817) (Timor)
  - Black-necklaced honeyeater, Lichmera notabilis (Finsch, 1898) (Wetar)
- Phylidonyris
  - Crescent honeyeater, Phylidonyris pyrrhopterus (Latham, 1801)
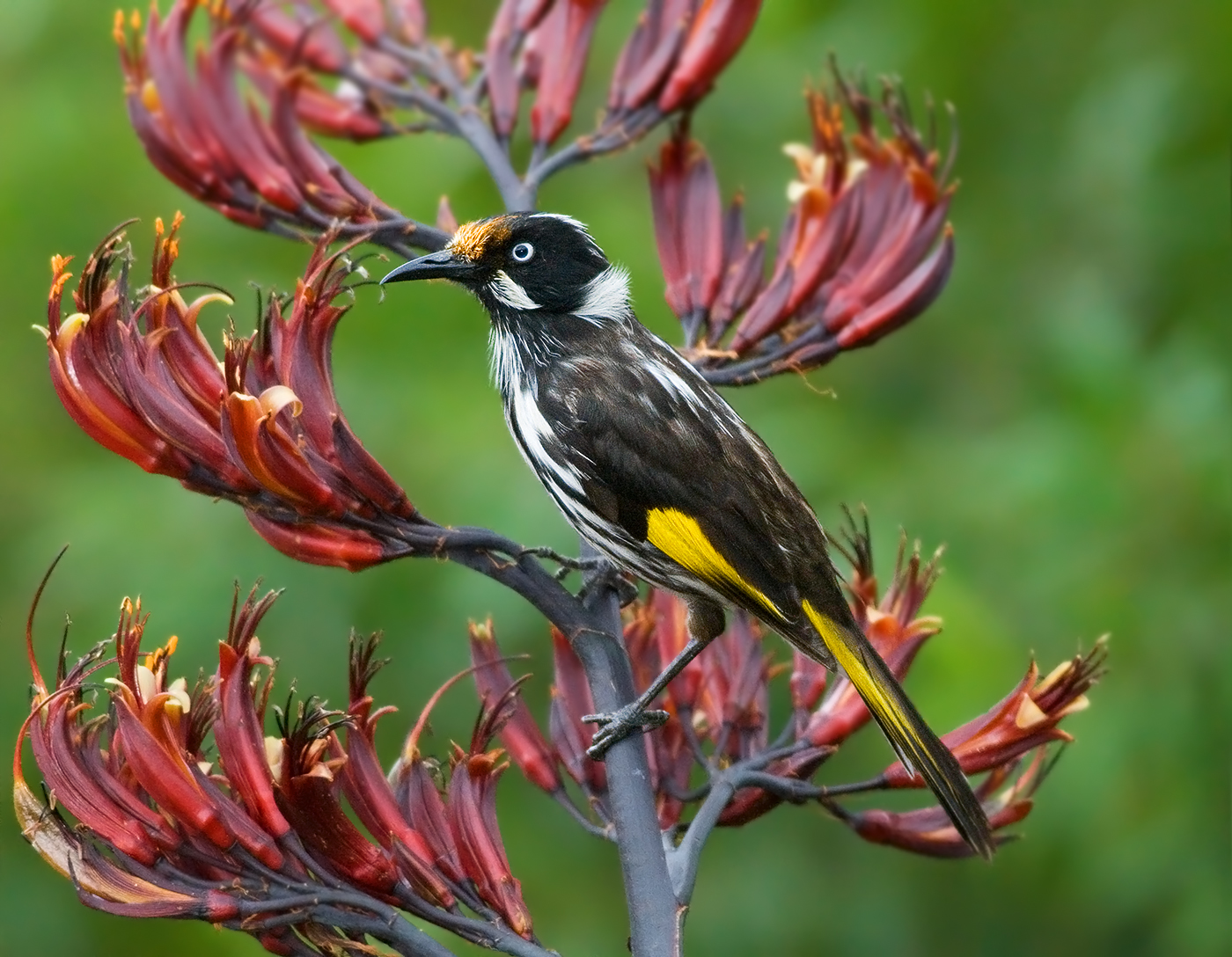
    New Holland honeyeater (Phylidonyris novaehollandiae)
  - New Holland honeyeater, Phylidonyris novaehollandiae (Latham, 1790)
  - White-cheeked honeyeater, Phylidonyris niger (Bechstein, 1811)
- Trichodere
  - White-streaked honeyeater, Trichodere cockerelli (Gould, 1869) (northeastern Australia)
- Grantiella
  - Painted honeyeater, Grantiella picta (Gould, 1838)
- Plectorhyncha
  - Striped honeyeater, Plectorhyncha lanceolata Gould, 1838
- Xanthotis
  - Spotted honeyeater, Xanthotis polygrammus (Gray, GR, 1862)
  - Macleay's honeyeater, Xanthotis macleayanus (Ramsay, EP, 1875)
  - Tawny-breasted honeyeater, Xanthotis flaviventer (Lesson, RP, 1828)
- Meliphacator
  - Kadavu honeyeater, Meliphacator provocator (Layard, EL, 1875)
- Philemon
  - Meyer's friarbird, Philemon meyeri Salvadori, 1878
  - Brass's friarbird, Philemon brassi Rand, 1940
  - Little friarbird, Philemon citreogularis (Gould, 1837)
  - Grey friarbird, Philemon kisserensis Meyer, AB, 1884 (sometimes considered as a subspecies of the little friarbird Philemon citreogularis kisserensis)
  - Timor friarbird, Philemon inornatus (Gray, GR, 1846)
  - Morotai friarbird, Philemon fuscicapillus (Wallace, 1862)
  - Seram friarbird, Philemon subcorniculatus (Hombron & Jacquinot, 1841)
  - Buru friarbird, Philemon moluccensis (Gmelin, JF, 1788)
  - Tanimbar friarbird, Philemon plumigenis (Gray, GR, 1858)
  - Helmeted friarbird, Philemon buceroides (Swainson, 1838)
  - New Guinea friarbird, Philemon novaeguineae (Müller, S, 1842)
  - New Britain friarbird, Philemon cockerelli Sclater, PL, 1877
  - New Ireland friarbird, Philemon eichhorni Rothschild & Hartert, EJO, 1924
  - Manus friarbird, Philemon albitorques Sclater, PL, 1877
  - Silver-crowned friarbird, Philemon argenticeps (Gould, 1840)
  - Noisy friarbird, Philemon corniculatus (Latham, 1790)
  - New Caledonian friarbird, Philemon diemenensis (Lesson, RP, 1831)
- Melitograis
  - White-streaked friarbird, Melitograis gilolensis (Bonaparte, 1850)
- Entomyzon
  - Blue-faced honeyeater, Entomyzon cyanotis (Latham, 1801)
- Melithreptus
  - Black-chinned honeyeater, Melithreptus gularis (Gould, 1837)
  - Strong-billed honeyeater, Melithreptus validirostris (Gould, 1837)
  - Brown-headed honeyeater, Melithreptus brevirostris (Vigors & Horsfield, 1827)
  - White-throated honeyeater, Melithreptus albogularis Gould, 1848
  - White-naped honeyeater, Melithreptus lunatus (Vieillot, 1802)
  - Gilbert's honeyeater, Melithreptus chloropsis Gould, 1848
  - Black-headed honeyeater, Melithreptus affinis (Lesson, RP, 1839)
- Foulehaio
  - Polynesian wattled honeyeater, Foulehaio carunculatus (Gmelin, JF, 1788)
  - Fiji wattled honeyeater, Foulehaio taviunensis (Wiglesworth, 1891)
  - Kikau, Foulehaio procerior (Finsch & Hartlaub, 1867)
- Nesoptilotis
  - White-eared honeyeater, Nesoptilotis leucotis (Latham, 1801)
  - Yellow-throated honeyeater, Nesoptilotis flavicollis (Vieillot, 1817)
- Ashbyia
  - Gibberbird, Ashbyia lovensis (Ashby, 1911)
- Epthianura
  - Crimson chat, Epthianura tricolor Gould, 1841
  - Orange chat, Epthianura aurifrons Gould, 1838
  - Yellow chat, Epthianura crocea Castelnau & Ramsay, EP, 1877
  - White-fronted chat, Epthianura albifrons (Jardine & Selby, 1828)
- Melilestes
  - Long-billed honeyeater, Melilestes megarhynchus (Gray, GR, 1858) (New Guinea, Aru Islands, western islands of Papua New Guinea)
- Macgregoria
  - MacGregor's honeyeater, Macgregoria pulchra De Vis, 1897
- Melipotes
  - Arfak honeyeater, Melipotes gymnops Sclater, PL, 1874
  - Common smoky honeyeater, Melipotes fumigatus Meyer, AB, 1886
  - Wattled smoky honeyeater, Melipotes carolae Beehler, Prawiradilaga, de Fretes & Kemp, N, 2007
  - Spangled honeyeater, Melipotes ater Rothschild & Hartert, EJO, 1911
- Timeliopsis
  - Olive straightbill, Timeliopsis fulvigula (Schlegel, 1871) (New Guinea)
  - Tawny straightbill, Timeliopsis griseigula (Schlegel, 1871) (northwestern and southeastern New Guinea)
- Conopophila
  - Rufous-banded honeyeater, Conopophila albogularis (Gould, 1843)
  - Rufous-throated honeyeater, Conopophila rufogularis (Gould, 1843)
  - Grey honeyeater, Conopophila whitei (North, 1910)
- Ramsayornis
  - Bar-breasted honeyeater, Ramsayornis fasciatus (Gould, 1843)
  - Brown-backed honeyeater, Ramsayornis modestus (Gray, GR, 1858)
- Acanthagenys
  - Spiny-cheeked honeyeater, Acanthagenys rufogularis Gould, 1838
- Anthochaera
  - Little wattlebird, Anthochaera chrysoptera (Latham, 1801)
  - Western wattlebird, Anthochaera lunulata Gould, 1838
  - Red wattlebird, Anthochaera carunculata (Shaw, 1790)
  - Yellow wattlebird, Anthochaera paradoxa (Daudin, 1800)
  - Regent honeyeater, Anthochaera phrygia (Shaw, 1794)
- Bolemoreus
  - Bridled honeyeater, Bolemoreus frenatus (Ramsay, EP, 1874)
  - Eungella honeyeater, Bolemoreus hindwoodi (Longmore & Boles, 1983)
- Caligavis
  - Yellow-faced honeyeater, Caligavis chrysops (Latham, 1801)
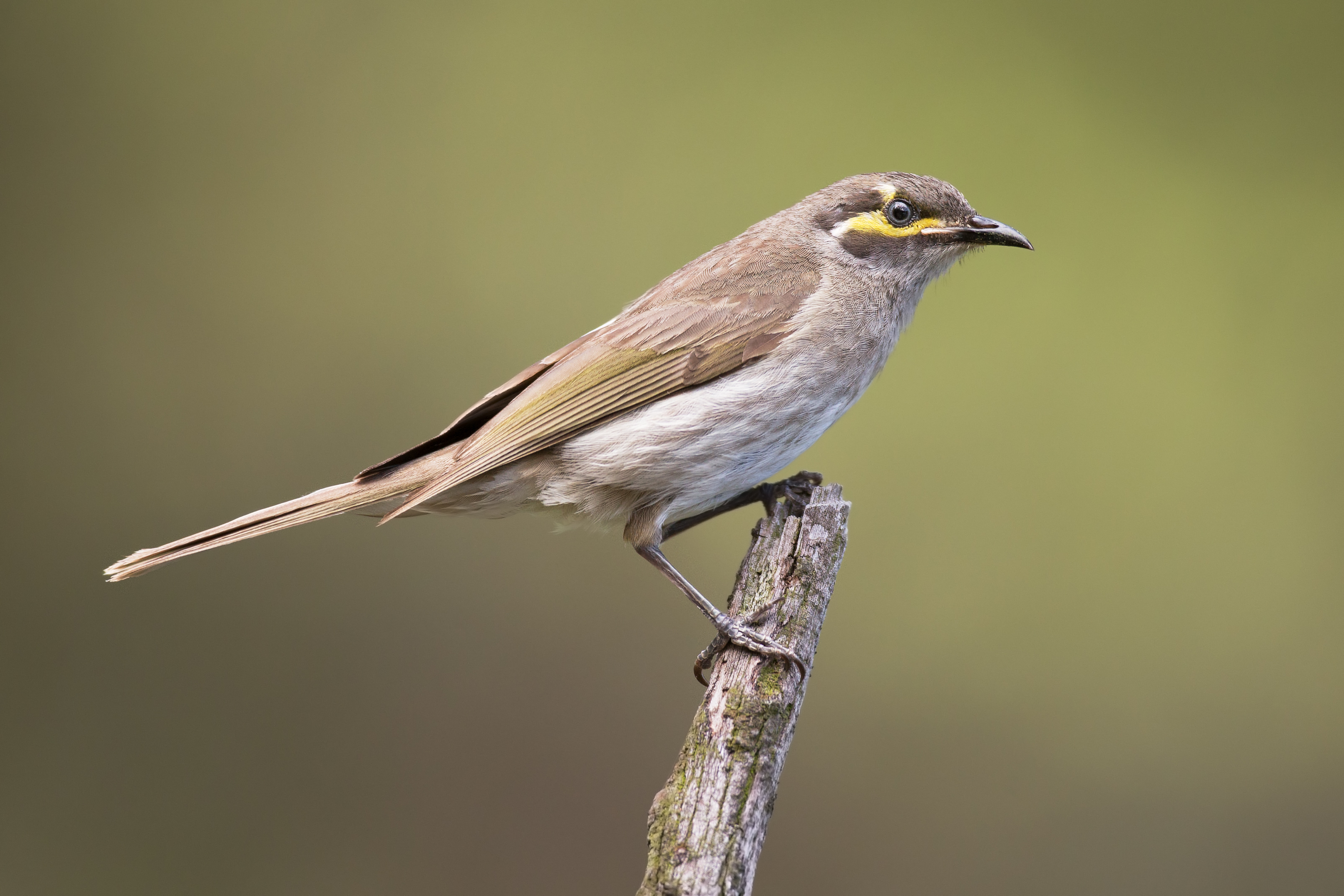
    Yellow-faced honeyeater, Caligavis chrysops
  - Black-throated honeyeater, Caligavis subfrenata (Salvadori, 1876)
  - Obscure honeyeater, Caligavis obscura (De Vis, 1897)
- Lichenostomus
  - Yellow-tufted honeyeater, Lichenostomus melanops (Latham, 1801)
  - Purple-gaped honeyeater, Lichenostomus cratitius (Gould, 1841)
- Manorina
  - Bell miner, Manorina melanophrys (Latham, 1801)
  - Noisy miner, Manorina melanocephala (Latham, 1801)
  - Yellow-throated miner, Manorina flavigula (Gould, 1840)
  - Black-eared miner, Manorina melanotis (Wilson, FE, 1911)
- Meliarchus
  - Makira honeyeater, Meliarchus sclateri (Gray, GR, 1870)
- Vosea
  - Gilliard's honeyeater, Vosea whitemanensis Gilliard, 1960
- Melionyx
  - Sooty honeyeater, Melionyx fuscus (De Vis, 1897)
  - Short-bearded honeyeater, Melionyx nouhuysi (van Oort, 1910)
  - Long-bearded honeyeater, Melionyx princeps (Mayr & Gilliard, 1951)
- Melidectes
  - Cinnamon-browed melidectes, Melidectes ochromelas (Meyer, AB, 1874)
  - Vogelkop melidectes, Melidectes leucostephes (Meyer, AB, 1874)
  - Yellow-browed melidectes, Melidectes rufocrissalis (Reichenow, 1915)
  - Huon melidectes, Melidectes foersteri (Rothschild & Hartert, EJO, 1911)
  - Belford's melidectes, Melidectes belfordi (De Vis, 1890)
  - Ornate melidectes, Melidectes torquatus Sclater, PL, 1874
- Purnella
  - White-fronted honeyeater, Purnella albifrons (Gould, 1841)
- Stomiopera
  - White-gaped honeyeater, Stomiopera unicolor (Gould, 1843)
  - Yellow honeyeater, Stomiopera flava (Gould, 1843)
- Gavicalis
  - Varied honeyeater, Gavicalis versicolor (Gould, 1843)
  - Mangrove honeyeater, Gavicalis fasciogularis (Gould, 1854)
  - Singing honeyeater, Gavicalis virescens (Vieillot, 1817)
- Ptilotula
  - Yellow-tinted honeyeater, Ptilotula flavescens (Gould, 1840)
  - Fuscous honeyeater, Ptilotula fusca (Gould, 1837)
  - Grey-headed honeyeater, Ptilotula keartlandi (North, 1895)
  - Grey-fronted honeyeater, Ptilotula plumula (Gould, 1841)
  - Yellow-plumed honeyeater, Ptilotula ornata (Gould, 1838)
  - White-plumed honeyeater, Ptilotula penicillata (Gould, 1837)
- Territornis
  - White-lined honeyeater, Territornis albilineata (White, HL, 1917)
  - Kimberley honeyeater, Territornis fordiana (Schodde, 1989)
  - Streak-breasted honeyeater, Territornis reticulata (Temminck, 1820)
- Microptilotis
  - Mottle-breasted honeyeater, Microptilotis mimikae (Ogilvie-Grant, 1911)
  - Forest honeyeater, Microptilotis montanus (Salvadori, 1880)
  - Mountain honeyeater, Microptilotis orientalis (Meyer, AB, 1894)
  - Scrub honeyeater, Microptilotis albonotatus (Salvadori, 1876)
  - Mimic honeyeater, Microptilotis analogus (Reichenbach, 1852)
  - Tagula honeyeater, Microptilotis vicina (Rothschild & Hartert, EJO, 1912)
  - Graceful honeyeater, Microptilotis gracilis (Gould, 1866)
  - Cryptic honeyeater, Microptilotis imitatrix (Mathews, 1912)
  - Elegant honeyeater, Microptilotis cinereifrons (Rand, 1936)
  - Yellow-gaped honeyeater, Microptilotis flavirictus (Salvadori, 1880)
- Meliphaga
  - Puff-backed honeyeater, Meliphaga aruensis (Sharpe, 1884)
  - Yellow-spotted honeyeater, Meliphaga notata (Gould, 1867)
  - Lewin's honeyeater, Meliphaga lewinii (Swainson, 1837)
- Guadalcanaria
  - Guadalcanal honeyeater, Guadalcanaria inexpectata Hartert, EJO, 1929
- Oreornis
  - Orange-cheeked honeyeater, Oreornis chrysogenys van Oort, 1910 (West Papua, Indonesia)
- Gymnomyza
  - Yellow-billed honeyeater, Gymnomyza viridis (Layard, EL, 1875)
  - Giant honeyeater, Gymnomyza brunneirostris (Mayr, 1932)
  - Mao, Gymnomyza samoensis (Hombron & Jacquinot, 1841)
  - Crow honeyeater, Gymnomyza aubryana (Verreaux, J & des Murs, 1860)
- Myza
  - Dark-eared myza, Myza celebensis (Meyer, AB & Wiglesworth, 1894)
  - White-eared myza, Myza sarasinorum Meyer, AB & Wiglesworth, 1895
- Stresemannia
  - Bougainville honeyeater, Stresemannia bougainvillei (Mayr, 1932) (Bougainville Island)
- Glycifohia
  - Barred honeyeater, Glycifohia undulata (Sparrman, 1787)
  - White-bellied honeyeater Glycifohia notabilis (Sharpe, 1899)
