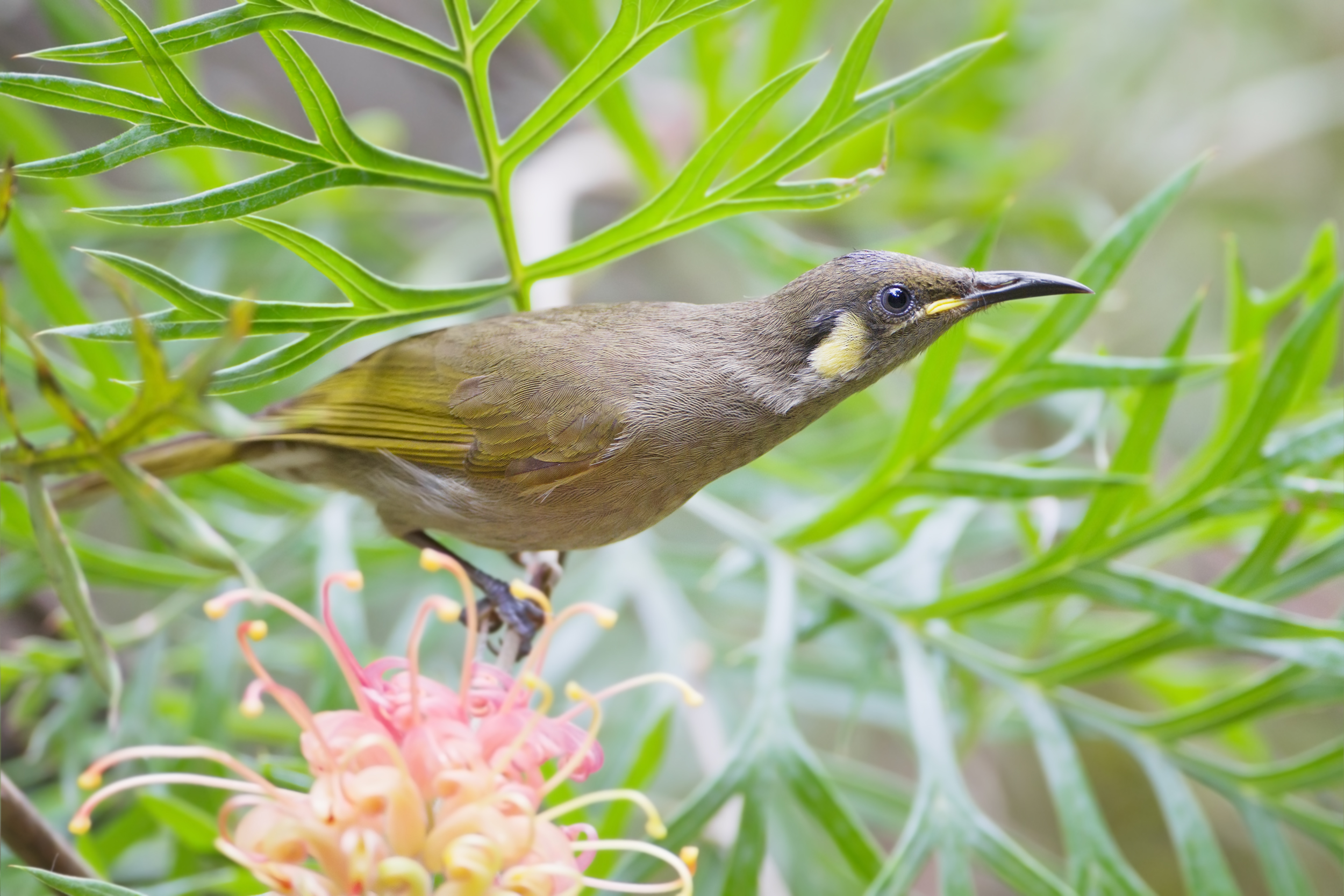
- Graceful honeyeater (Microptilotis gracilis)

Scientific classification
- Kingdom: Animalia
- Phylum: Chordata
- Class: Aves
- Order: Passeriformes
- Family: Meliphagidae
- Genus: Microptilotis; Mathews, 1912

= Microptilotis =

Genus of birds

Microptilotis is a genus of birds in the honeyeater family Meliphagidae.

The genus was introduced in 1912 by the Australian ornithologist Gregory Mathews with the graceful honeyeater (Microptilotis gracilis) as the type species. The genus name Microptilotis combines the Ancient Greek mikros meaning "small" and the genus name Ptilotis.

The genus contains 10 species:

Image	Name	Common name
	Microptilotis mimikae	Mottle-breasted honeyeater
	Microptilotis montanus	Forest honeyeater
	Microptilotis orientalis	Mountain honeyeater
	Microptilotis albonotatus	Scrub honeyeater
	Microptilotis analogus	Mimic honeyeater
	Microptilotis vicina	Tagula honeyeater
	Microptilotis gracilis	Graceful honeyeater
	Microptilotis imitatrix	Cryptic honeyeater
	Microptilotis cinereifrons	Elegant honeyeater
	Microptilotis flavirictus	Yellow-gaped honeyeater

The species now placed in Microptilotis were formerly placed in the genus Meliphaga. When molecular phylogenetic studies found that Meliphaga contained two distinct clades, the genus was split and many of the species transferred to the resurrected genus Microptilotis.
