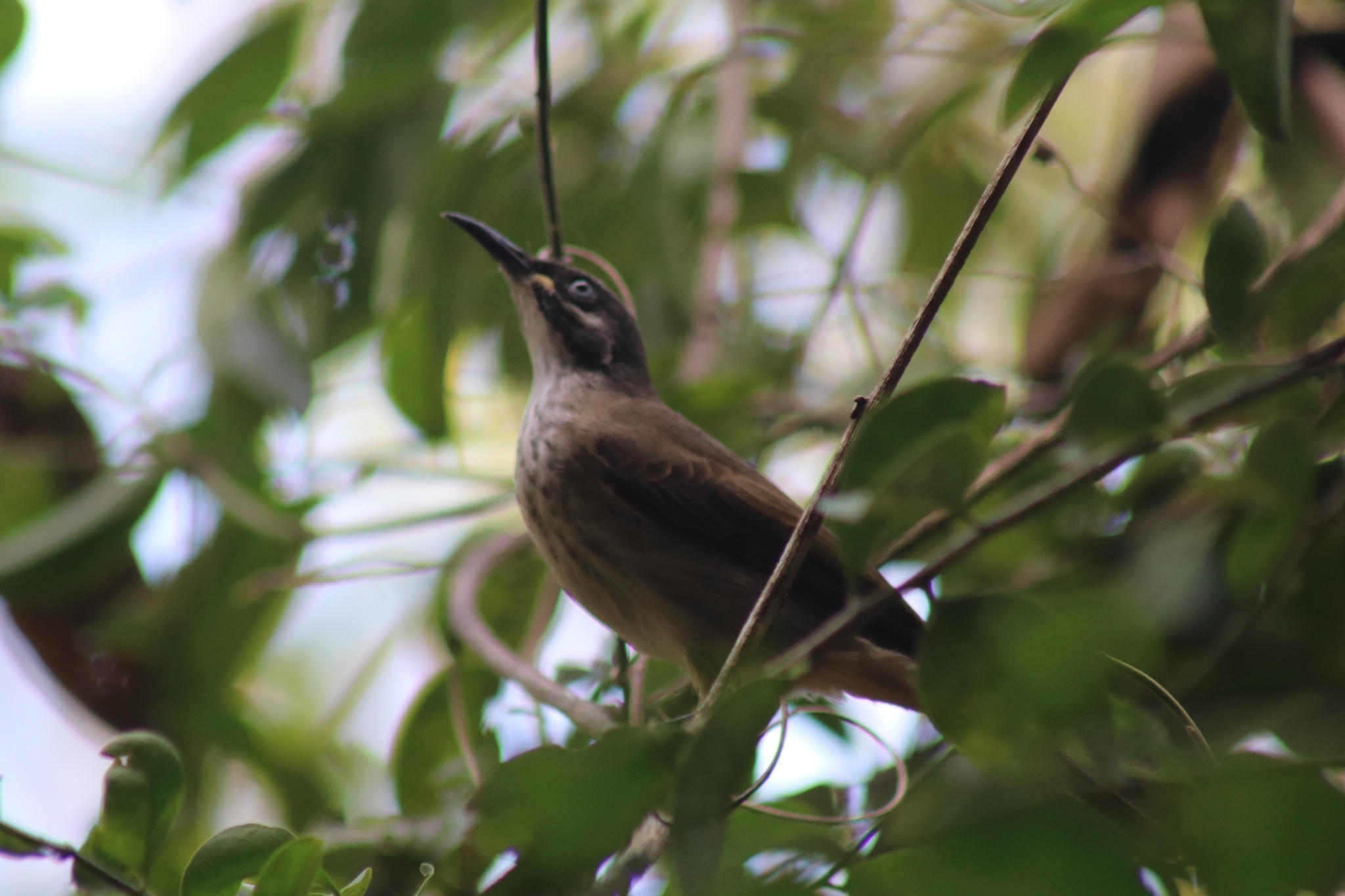
- White-lined honeyeater (Territornis albilineata)

Scientific classification
- Kingdom: Animalia
- Phylum: Chordata
- Class: Aves
- Order: Passeriformes
- Family: Meliphagidae
- Genus: Territornis; Mathews, 1924

= Territornis =

Genus of birds

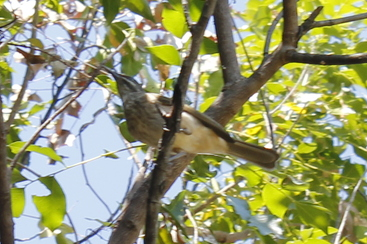
Kimberly honeyeater (Territornis fordiana)

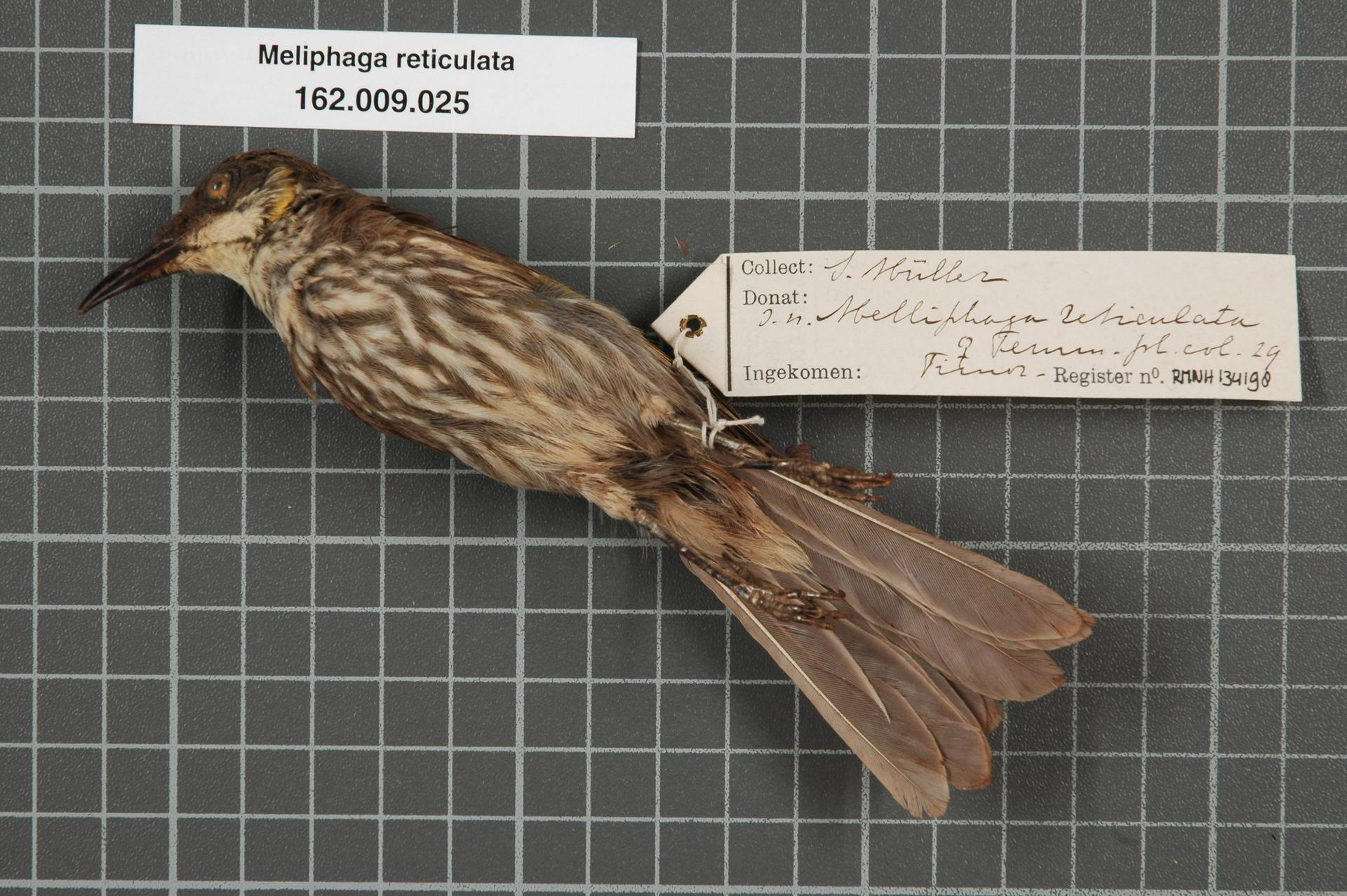
Streak-breasted honeyeater (Territornis reticulata) museum skin

Territornis is a genus of bird in the family Meliphagidae. It contains the following species:

Image	Name	Common name
	Territornis albilineata	White-lined honeyeater
	Territornis fordiana	Kimberley honeyeater
	Territornis reticulata	Streak-breasted honeyeater
