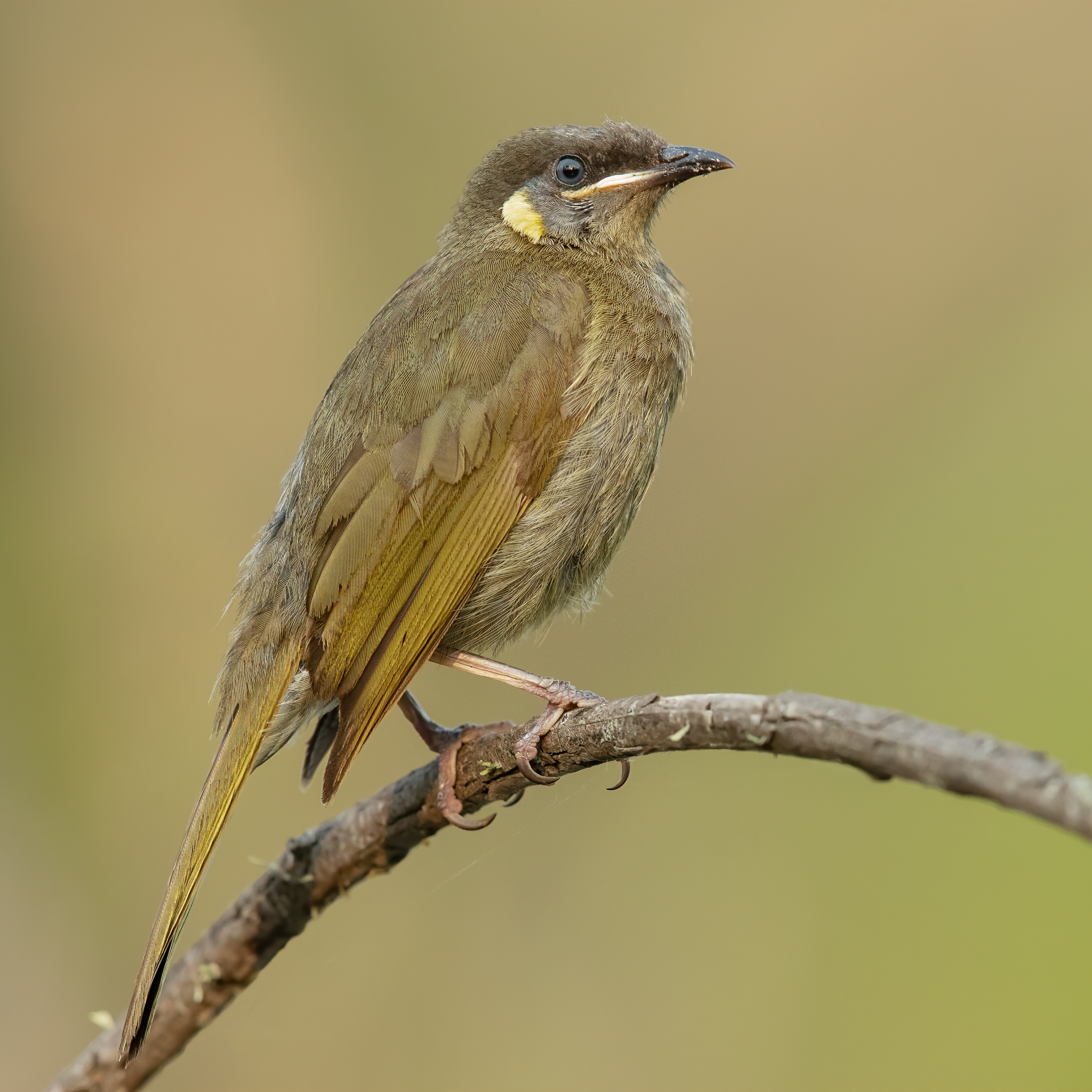
- Meliphaga lewinii lewinii, New South Wales

Conservation status
- Least Concern (IUCN 3.1)

Scientific classification
- Kingdom: Animalia
- Phylum: Chordata
- Class: Aves
- Order: Passeriformes
- Family: Meliphagidae
- Genus: Meliphaga
- Species: M. lewinii

Binomial name
- Meliphaga lewinii (Swainson, 1837)

= Lewin's honeyeater =

Species of bird

Lewin's honeyeater (Meliphaga lewinii) is a bird that inhabits the ranges along the east coast of Australia. It has a semicircular ear-patch, pale yellow in colour.

Another name is Yellow-eared Honeyeater.

== Description ==
The Lewin's honeyeater is small to medium in size, around 19–22 cm (7.5–8.7 in) long with a weight of 27–49 g. The average wingspan is 8.4–10.6 cm (3.3 to 4.2 in), and the bill is 2.0–2.7 cm in length. It is dark greenish-grey in colour, with a creamy yellow gape (i.e., the fleshy corners of the mouth). It has large, yellowish, crescent-shaped ear-patches, which distinguish it from other honeyeaters, apart from two similar, but smaller, species in tropical Queensland. In flight, the pale yellow edges of the flight feathers can be seen. The bill is black and the eye is blue-grey. Both sexes are similar in appearance. Young Lewin's honeyeaters are similar to the adults, but have brown eyes. The strong 'machine gun-like' rattling notes of Lewin's honeyeater are heard over long distances, and reveal its presence in an area.

Body size, voice, and the shape and size of the ear-patch help in identifying the similar Graceful and Yellow-spotted Honeyeaters in tropical Queensland.

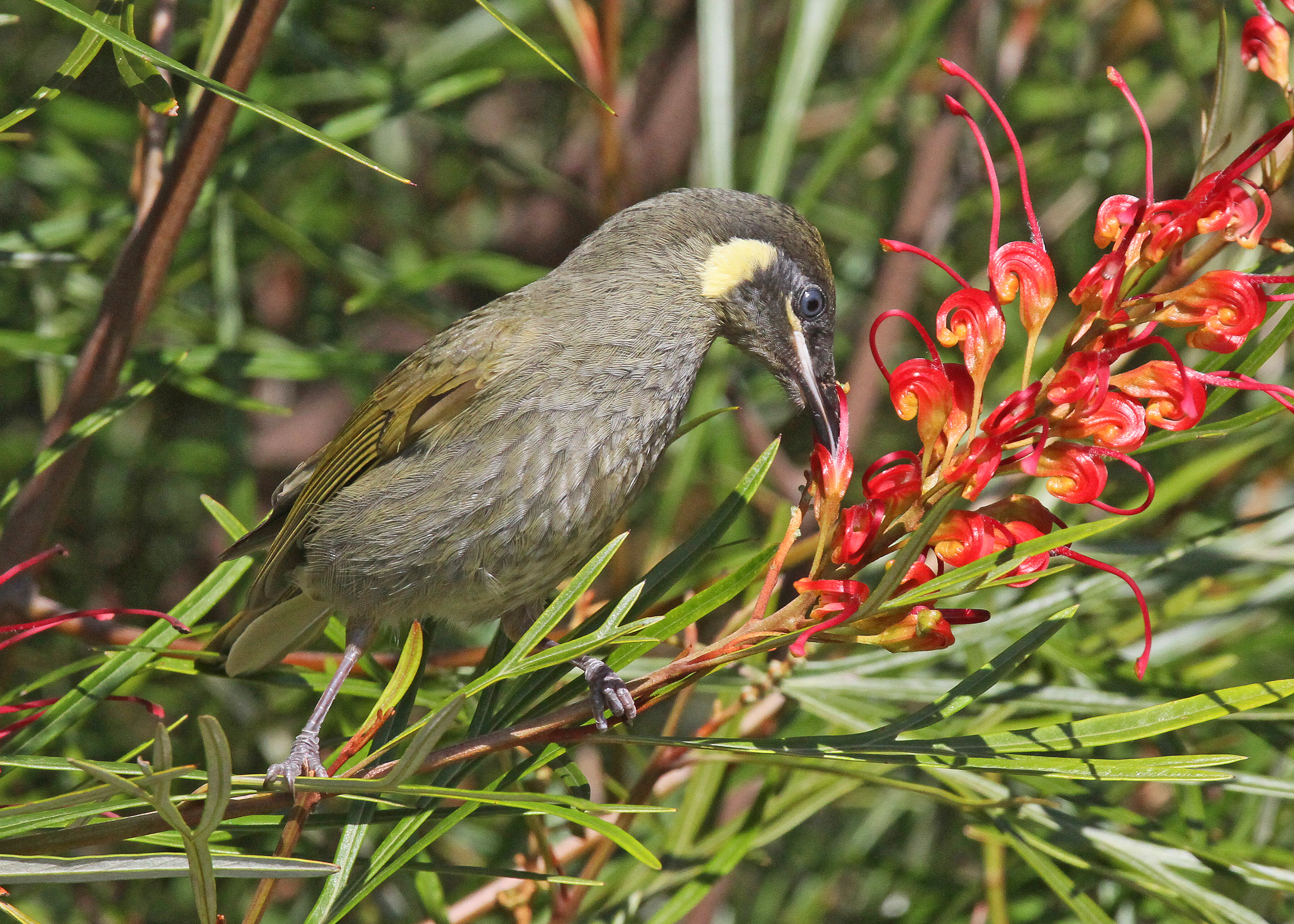
M. l. lewinii Feeding on the nectar of a Grevillea flower

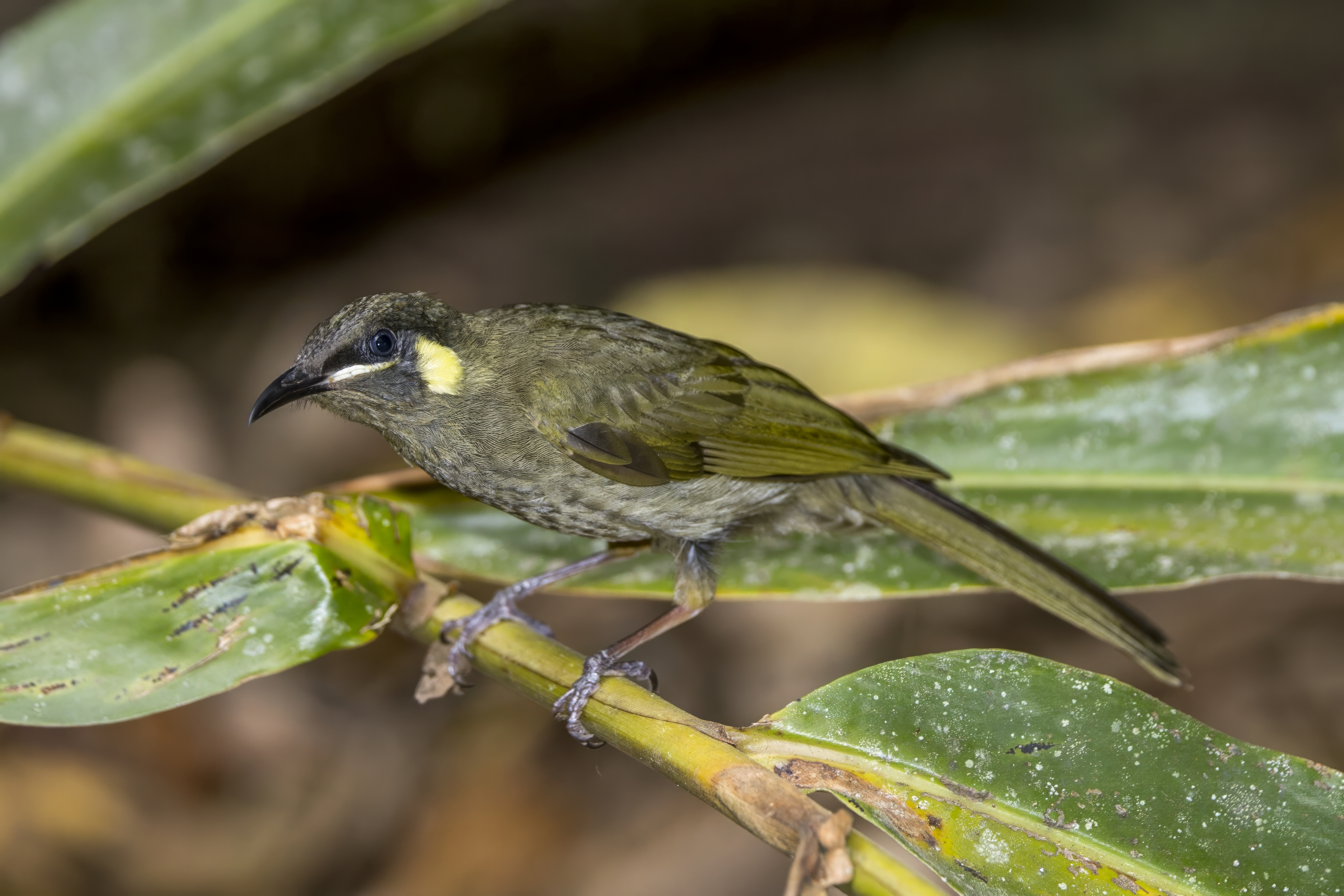
M. l. mab, Atherton Tableland

Dayboro, SE Queensland, Australia

== Taxonomy ==
The name of this bird commemorates the Australian artist John Lewin, who first described the species in his 1808 book Birds of New Holland with their Natural History.

=== Subspecies ===
Three subspecies are recognised:

- M. l. lewinii, the nominate subspecies, found from central Victoria to the Rockhampton Region in Queensland. The most common of the three and the only subspecies found outside of Queensland.
- M. l. mab, found from Rockhampton to Cooktown in coastal areas of northeastern Queensland.
- M. l. amphochlora, primarily found in high-altitude areas of the McIlwraith Range on the Cape York Peninsula in northeastern Queensland.

== Distribution and habitat ==
The Lewin's honeyeater prefers the wetter parts of eastern Australia, from northern Queensland to central Victoria. It is found in both rainforest and wet sclerophyll forest, and often wanders into more open woodland. It is a common bird, and its call is often heard in these areas. It is a rather sedentary species, tending to stay in the same area all year round, although some altitudinal migration, to lower elevations in the cooler winter months, occurs.

== Diet ==
Lewin's honeyeaters feed mostly on fruits, favouring berries and small fruits, but also eat insects and nectar. Birds are normally seen alone, but may form loose groups of up to 10 birds. They feed in the upper branches and on the trunks of trees. Some insects are caught in flight.

== Breeding ==
Lewin's honeyeaters breed during September to January. The nest is a large cup of vegetation and other materials, bound together with spider web, and lined with soft material. The two to three oval eggs are incubated for about 14 days, and the young birds leave the nest after a further 14 days. It is unclear what roles each parent performs in nest building and incubation, but both care for the young birds.
