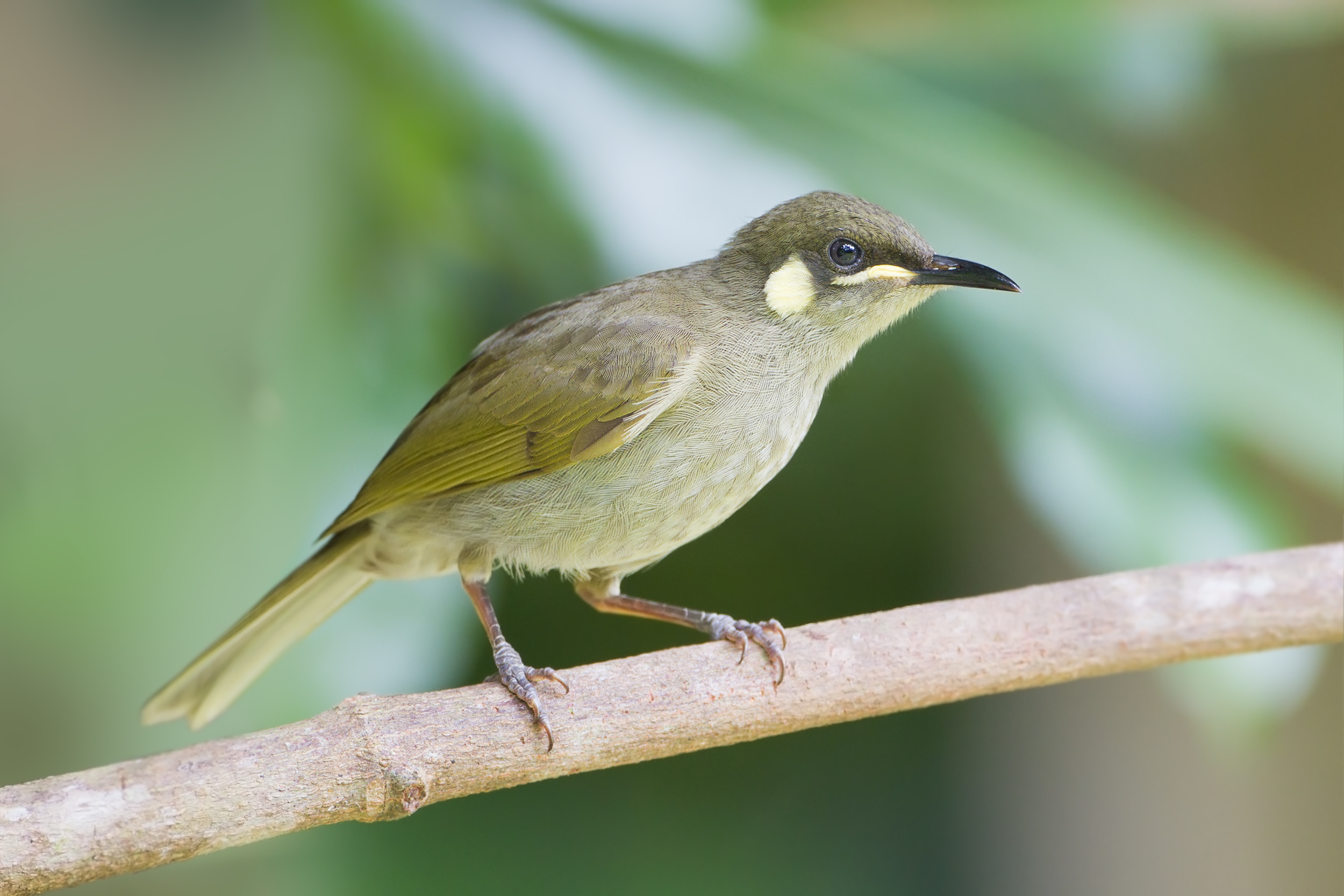

Conservation status
- Least Concern (IUCN 3.1)

Scientific classification
- Kingdom: Animalia
- Phylum: Chordata
- Class: Aves
- Order: Passeriformes
- Family: Meliphagidae
- Genus: Meliphaga
- Species: M. notata

Binomial name
- Meliphaga notata (Gould, 1867)

= Yellow-spotted honeyeater =

Species of bird

The yellow-spotted honeyeater (Meliphaga notata) is a species of bird in the family Meliphagidae. It is also known as the lesser lewin. The bird is endemic to northern Queensland. The bird's common name refers to the yellow patch that members of the species have behind their eyes.

The yellow-spotted honeyeater is olive, brown, and gray in colour. The bird's weight ranges from around 23 to 30 grams, and the wingspan ranges from about 8 to 9 centimeters. The species contains two subspecies, which are known as Meliphaga notata notata and Meliphaga notata mixta. Yellow-spotted honeyeaters are aggressive and have a loud and metallic call.

== Taxonomy ==
The yellow-spotted honeyeater belongs to the order Passeriformes and the family Meliphagidae. The species may consist of two subspecies: Meliphaga notata notata and Meliphaga notata mixta. The former was described by Gould in 1867 and the latter by Matthews in 1912. The specific epithet notata derives from the Latin notatus, meaning 'spotted' or 'marked'.

A bird similar to the yellow-spotted honeyeater was described in 1844.

== Description ==
The yellow-spotted honeyeater is olive-brown on the top and olive-gray below. However, there are brighter yellow areas on the bird's head. The bird has brown legs, feet and eyes; the beak is also brown. It is 16 to 20 cm (6.3 to 7.9 in) in size.

The mass of male yellow-spotted honeyeaters ranges from 24 to 29.5 grams, and averages at 27 g. Females range from 23.5 to 30 g, and average at 25.9 g.

For the subspecies Meliphaga notata notata, the average wingspan is 8.6 to 9.1 cm (3.4 to 3.6 in) for males and 7.9 to 8.3 cm (3.1 to 3.3 in) for females. For the subspecies Meliphaga notata mixta, the average wingspan is 8.3 to 8.7 cm (3.3 to 3.4 in) for males and 7.7 to 8.1 cm (3.0 to 3.2 in) for females.

== Habitat ==
The bird largely lives in the tropical rainforests of North Queensland in extreme northeastern Australia, between Mackay and northern Cape York Peninsula. In 1901, it was also said to inhabit New Guinea.

Yellow-spotted honeyeaters typically live at elevations of 200 metres (660 ft) or greater. They have been observed at elevations as high as 1,200 m (3,900 ft) above sea level, although they are not often observed above 500 m (1,600 ft). While the birds typically live in forests, they have been known to visit suburbs with sufficient tree cover. They have even been observed in some cities that use local plants for landscaping. The species lives in both open forests and forests with an understory of shrubs.

The yellow-spotted honeyeater co-exists with the graceful honeyeater.

=== Population status ===
The yellow-spotted honeyeater is in the least concern category of the IUCN Red List. The total population of the species is apparently stable. The size of its range is over 110,000 square kilometers.

== Behaviour ==
The call of the yellow-spotted honeyeater has been described as a metallic, high-pitched and "rattling song consisting of four to five 'ee-yeu' repetitions". The bird's call has also been said to sound like a "machine gun rattle". It eats insects, nectar, and fruit. Its body is partially horizontal when perching.

The yellow-spotted honeyeater is loud and aggressive. It tends to be solitary, or live in groups of two or, at most, several birds. It does not migrate.

== Breeding ==
The nest of the yellow-spotted honeyeater is cup-shaped, usually secured at three points, and made of interwoven bark and light plant material. It often nests in bushes. However, it also nests in trees. The nest is usually 4.4 cm (1.7 in) to 7.6 cm (3.0 in) deep and 8.9 cm (3.5 in) to 10.2 cm (4.0 in) across. The actual area of the nest where the eggs are kept ranges from 3.8 cm (1.5 in) to 5.1 cm (2.0 in) deep and 6.4 cm (2.5 in) to 7.6 cm (3.0 in) across.

The eggs of the yellow-spotted honeyeater range between inclined and elliptical and have a glossy surface. While most of the egg is typically white, there are some purple or brown patches at the top of it. The eggs usually are laid two at a time, but are sometimes laid three at a time.

The birds breed between August and January. Young birds hatch after about two weeks of incubation, and leave the nest after another two weeks or so.

One generation for the birds lasts about 5.5 years.

== See also ==
- Lewin's honeyeater
