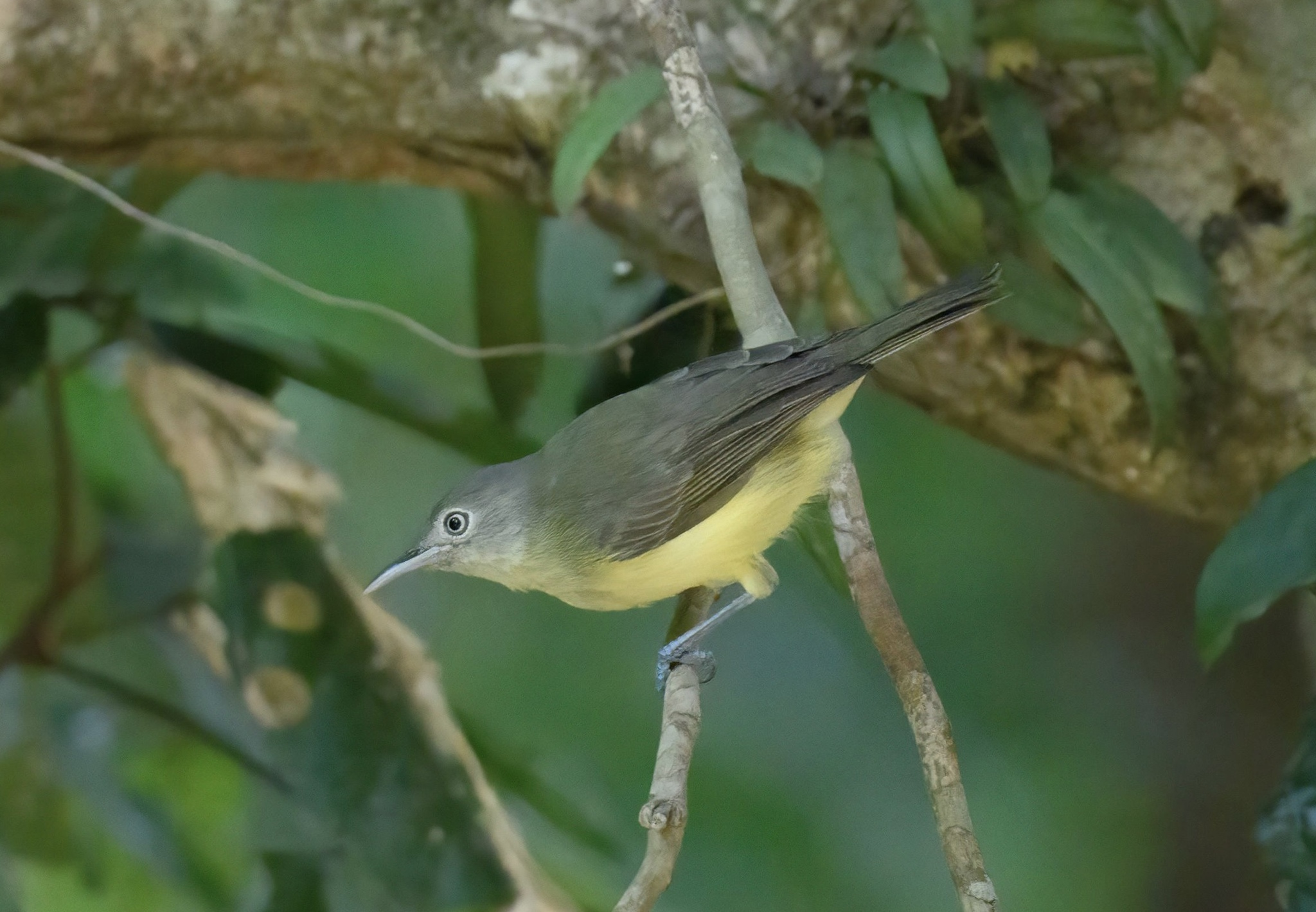

Conservation status
- Least Concern (IUCN 3.1)

Scientific classification
- Kingdom: Animalia
- Phylum: Chordata
- Class: Aves
- Order: Passeriformes
- Family: Meliphagidae
- Genus: Glycichaera; Salvadori, 1878
- Species: G. fallax

Binomial name
- Glycichaera fallax Salvadori, 1878

= Green-backed honeyeater =

Species of bird

The green-backed honeyeater (Glycichaera fallax) is a species of bird in the family Meliphagidae. It is monotypic within the genus Glycichaera. It is found in the Aru Islands, New Guinea and northern Cape York Peninsula. Its natural habitat is subtropical or tropical moist lowland forests.
