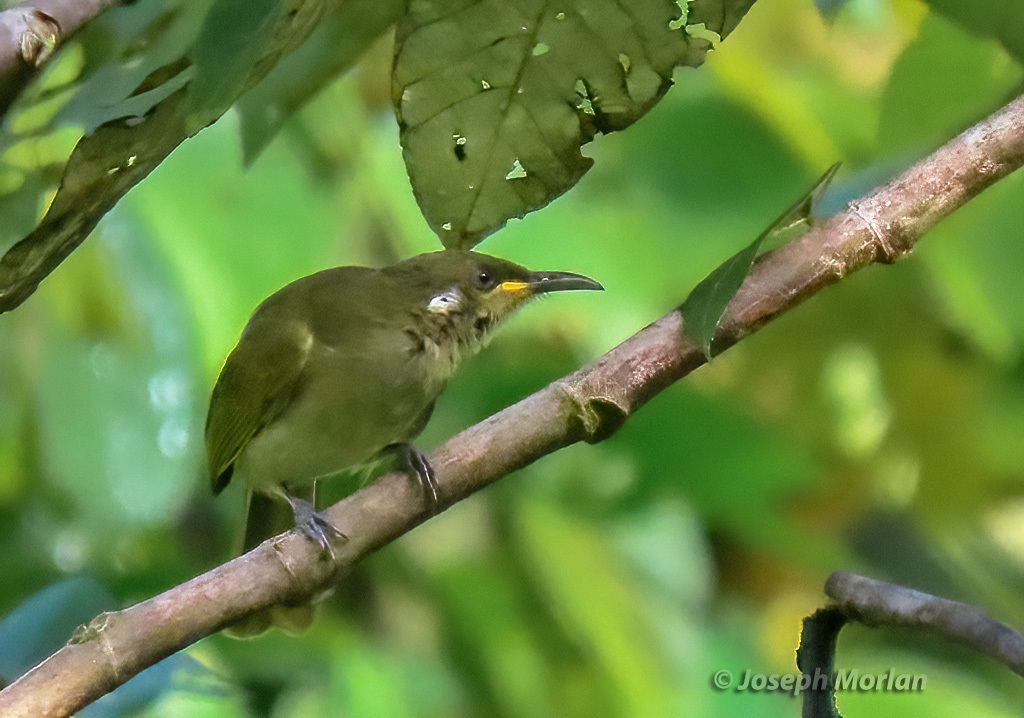

Conservation status
- Least Concern (IUCN 3.1)

Scientific classification
- Kingdom: Animalia
- Phylum: Chordata
- Class: Aves
- Order: Passeriformes
- Family: Meliphagidae
- Genus: Meliphaga
- Species: M. aruensis

Binomial name
- Meliphaga aruensis (Sharpe, 1884)

= Puff-backed honeyeater =

Species of bird

The puff-backed honeyeater (Meliphaga aruensis) is a species of bird in the family Meliphagidae. It is widely spread throughout New Guinea. Its natural habitats are subtropical or tropical moist lowland forests and subtropical or tropical moist montane forests.
