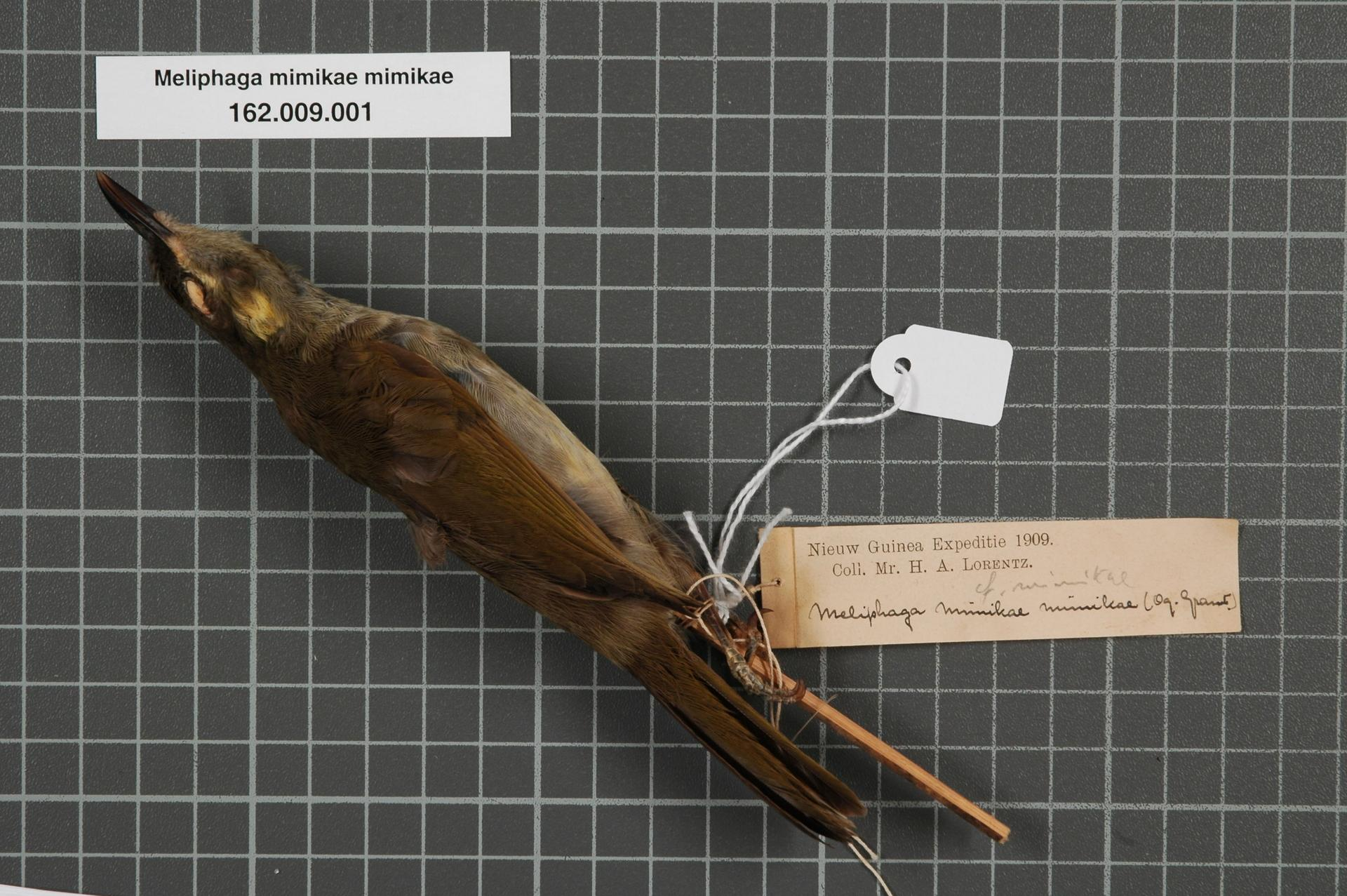

Conservation status
- Least Concern (IUCN 3.1)

Scientific classification
- Kingdom: Animalia
- Phylum: Chordata
- Class: Aves
- Order: Passeriformes
- Family: Meliphagidae
- Genus: Meliphaga
- Species: M. mimikae

Binomial name
- Meliphaga mimikae (Ogilvie-Grant, 1911)

Synonyms
- Microptilotis mimikae

= Mottle-breasted honeyeater =

Species of bird

The mottle-breasted honeyeater (Meliphaga mimikae), also known as the spot-breasted honeyeater, is a species of bird in the honeyeater family Meliphagidae. It is found in the interior of southern New Guinea in subtropical or tropical moist montane forest.

== Taxonomy ==
The mottle-breasted honeyeater was formally described in 1911 by the Scottish ornithologist William Robert Ogilvie-Grant under the binomial name Ptilotis mimikae based on a specimen collected near the Mimika River in southwestern New Guinea. This species is now placed in the genus Meliphaga that was introduced in 1808 by the English artist John Lewin in 1808. The species in monotypic: no subspecies are recognised.

In 2019 molecular phylogenetic studies found that Meliphaga was paraphyletic with the monotypic genus Oreornis, containing the orange-cheeked honeyeater, embedded within it. To created monophyletic genera, the genus was split up and species moved into the resurrected genera Territornis and Microptilotis, leaving just three species in Meliphaga. The mottle-breasted honeyeater was placed in Microptilotis. In 2025 the AviList team instead adopted a broader Meliphaga that contained 17 species and included the orange-cheeked honeyeater and the mottle-breasted honeyeater.
