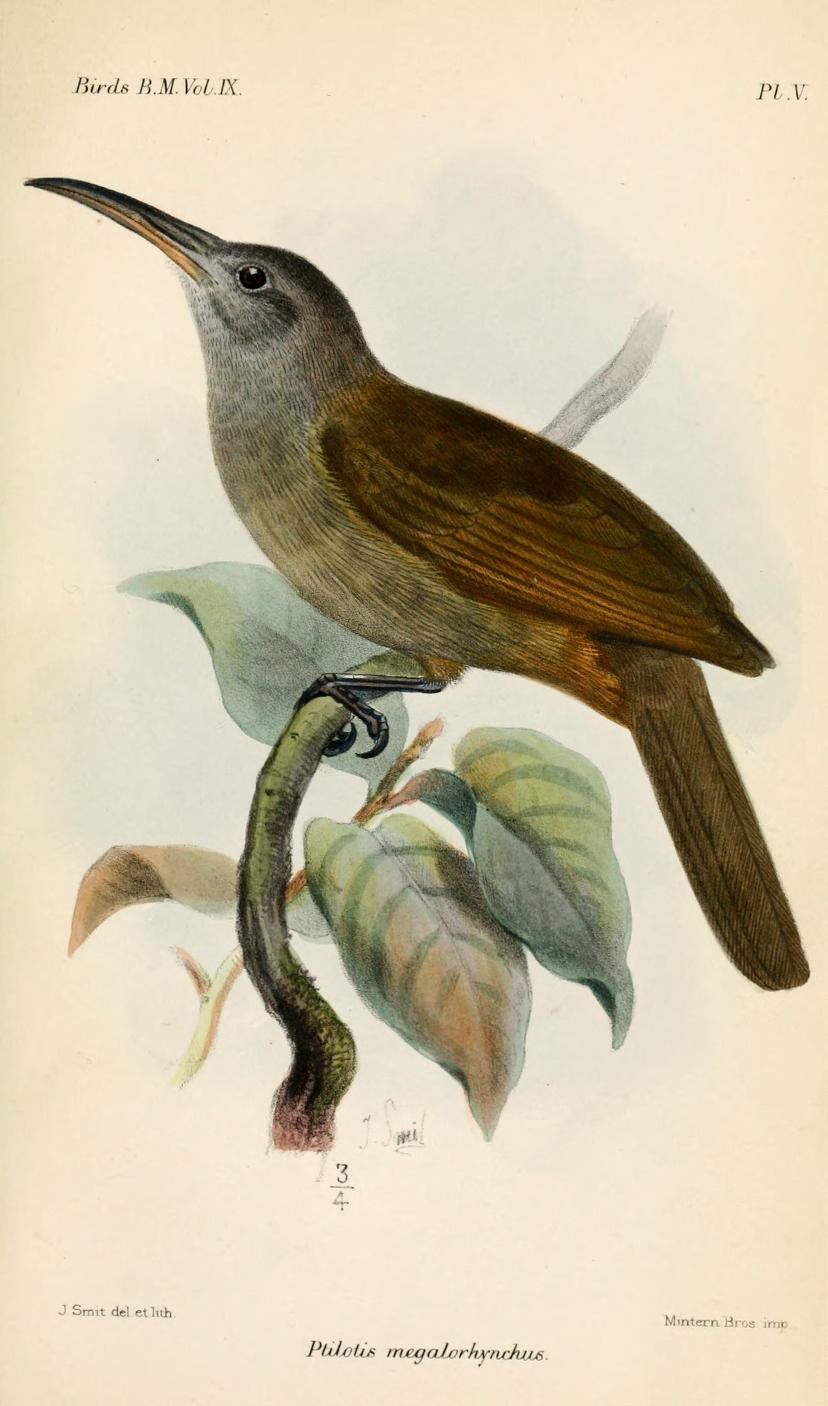
- Illustration by Joseph Smit, 1884
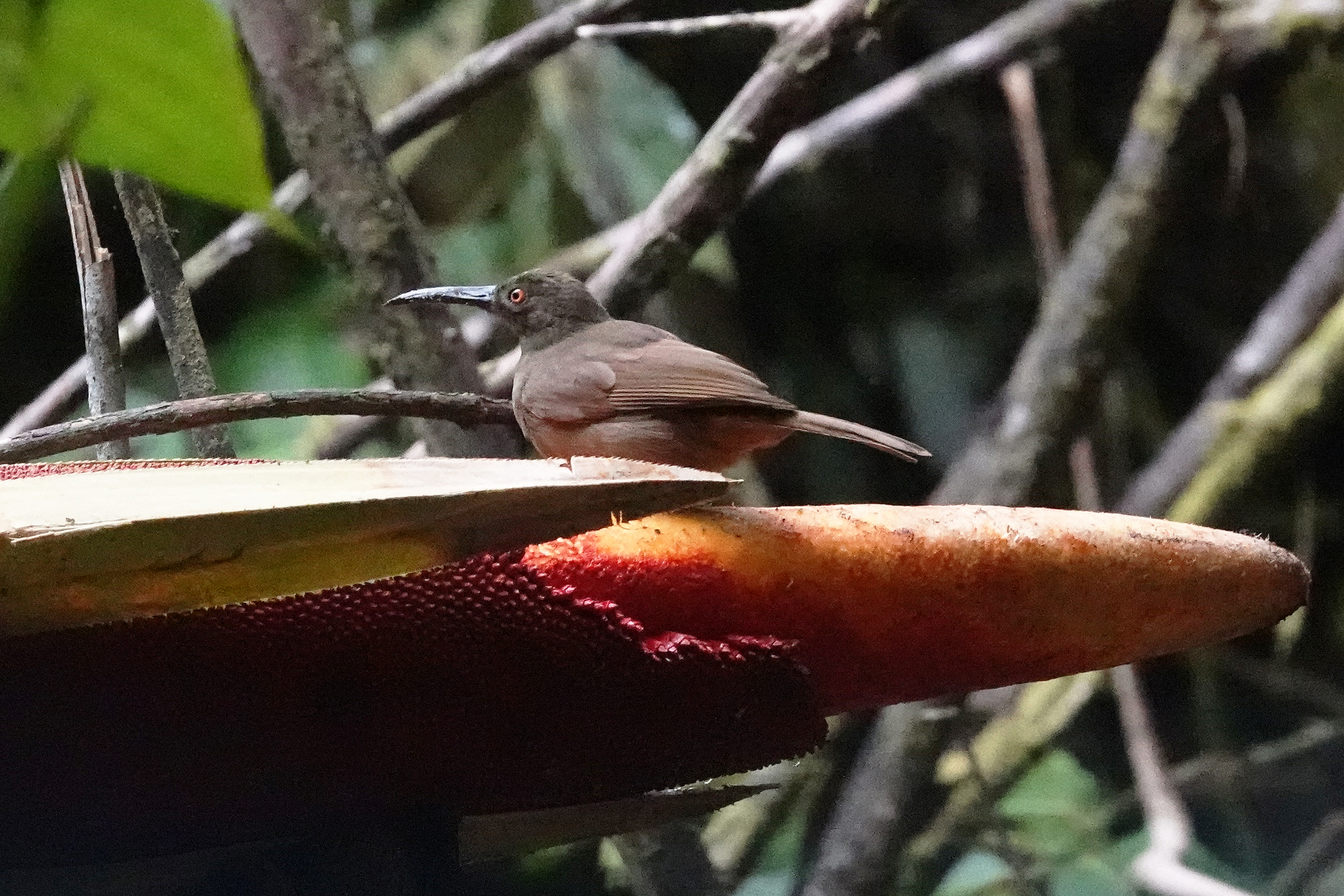

Conservation status
- Least Concern (IUCN 3.1)

Scientific classification
- Kingdom: Animalia
- Phylum: Chordata
- Class: Aves
- Order: Passeriformes
- Family: Meliphagidae
- Genus: Melilestes; Salvadori, 1876
- Species: M. megarhynchus

Binomial name
- Melilestes megarhynchus (Gray, 1858)

Synonyms
- Ptilotis megalorhynchus

= Long-billed honeyeater =

Species of bird

The long-billed honeyeater (Melilestes megarhynchus) is a species of bird in the family Meliphagidae. It is monotypic within the genus Melilestes.

== Distribution and habitat ==
It is found in New Guinea and offshore islands, where its natural habitats are subtropical or tropical moist lowland forest and subtropical or tropical moist montane forest. Long-billed honeyeaters do not migrate. The average generation length of it is 5.8 years.
