= Bougainville honeyeater =

Conservation status
- Least Concern (IUCN 3.1)

Scientific classification
- Kingdom: Animalia
- Phylum: Chordata
- Class: Aves
- Order: Passeriformes
- Family: Meliphagidae
- Genus: Stresemannia; Meise, 1950
- Species: S. bougainvillei

Binomial name
- Stresemannia bougainvillei (Mayr, 1932)

Species of bird

The Bougainville honeyeater (Stresemannia bougainvillei) is a species of bird in the family Meliphagidae. It is monotypic within the genus Stresemannia. It is endemic to Bougainville Island. Its natural habitats are subtropical or tropical moist lowland forests and subtropical or tropical moist montane forests.
