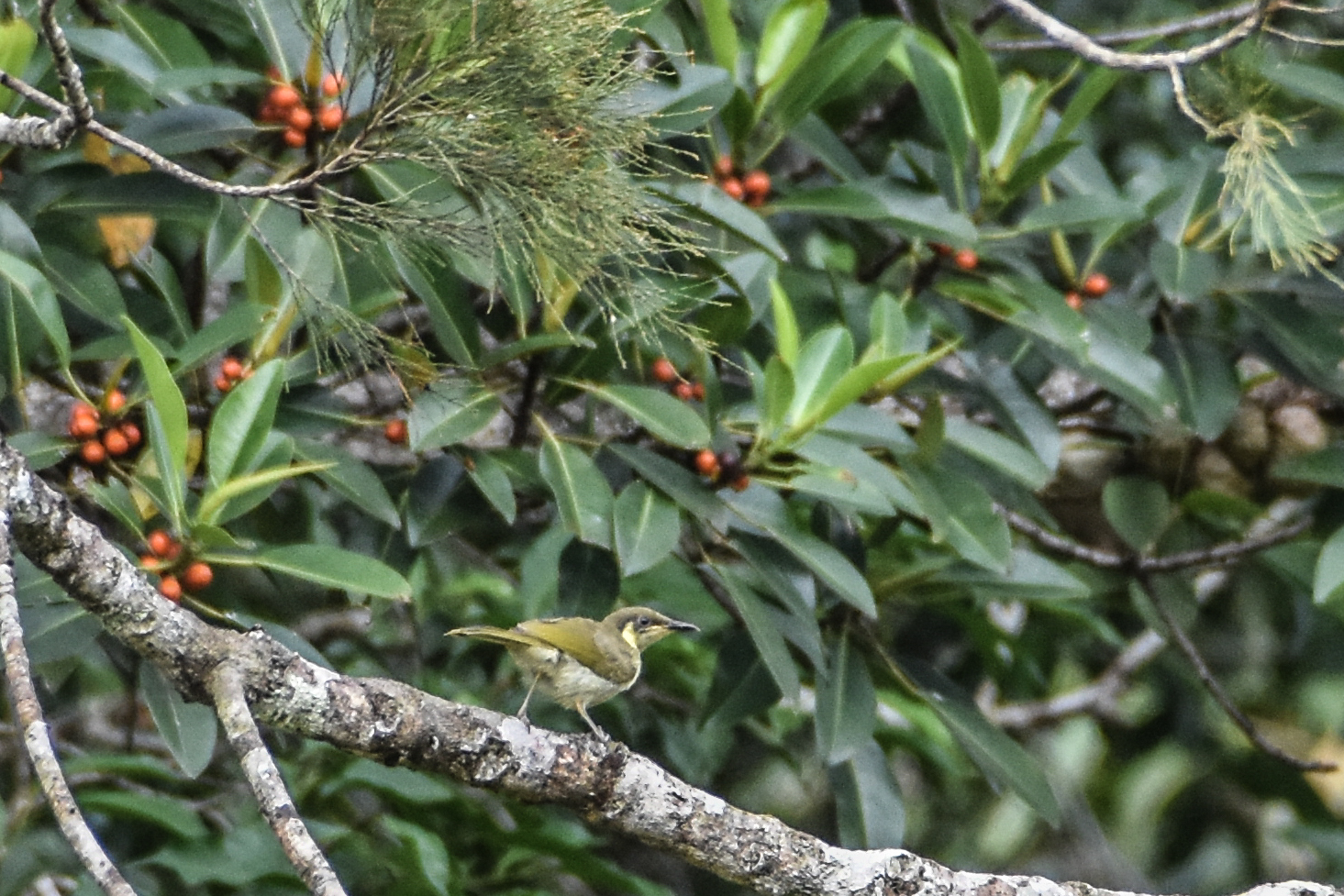

Conservation status
- Least Concern (IUCN 3.1)

Scientific classification
- Kingdom: Animalia
- Phylum: Chordata
- Class: Aves
- Order: Passeriformes
- Family: Meliphagidae
- Genus: Meliphaga
- Species: M. cinereifrons

Binomial name
- Meliphaga cinereifrons Rand, 1936

Synonyms
- Microptilotis cinereifrons

= Elegant honeyeater =

Species of bird

The elegant honeyeater (Meliphaga cinereifrons) is a species of bird in the family Meliphagidae. It is native to the Bird's Tail Peninsula (Papua New Guinea). Its natural habitats are subtropical or tropical moist lowland forests and subtropical or tropical moist montane forests.
