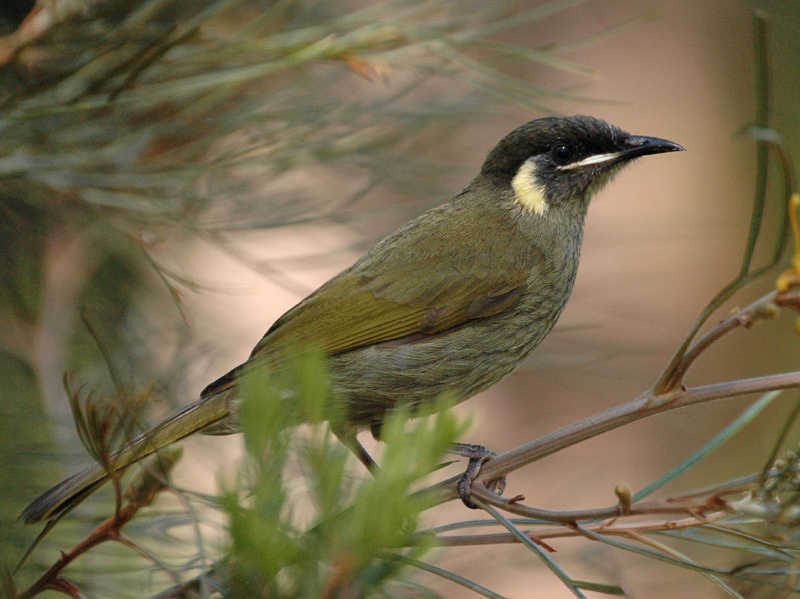
- Lewin's honeyeater (Meliphaga lewinii)

Scientific classification
- Kingdom: Animalia
- Phylum: Chordata
- Class: Aves
- Order: Passeriformes
- Family: Meliphagidae
- Genus: Meliphaga; Lewin, 1808

Type species
- Meliphaga chrysotis Lewin, 1808

= Meliphaga =

Genus of birds

Meliphaga is a genus of birds in the honeyeater family Meliphagidae.

The genus was introduced by the English artist John Lewin in 1808. The name Meliphaga combines the Ancient Greek meli meaning "honey" and phagos meaning eating. The type species is Lewin's honeyeater (Meliphaga lewinii).

In 2019 molecular phylogenetic studies found that Meliphaga was paraphyletic with the monotypic genus Oreornis, containing the orange-cheeked honeyeater, embedded within it. To created monophyletic genera, the genus was split up and species moved into the resurrected genera Territornis and Microptilotis, leaving just three species in Meliphaga. In 2025 the AviList team instead adopted a broader Meliphaga that contained 17 species and included the orange-cheeked honeyeater.

The genus contains 17 species:

| Image | Scientific name | Common name | Distribution |
|---|---|---|---|
| | Meliphaga aruensis | Puff-backed honeyeater | New Guinea including western Papuan islands, Aru and Trobriand islands, and D'Entrecasteaux Archipelago |
| | Meliphaga notata | Yellow-spotted honeyeater | northeast Australia |
| | Meliphaga lewinii | Lewin's honeyeater | east Australia |
| | Meliphaga reticulata | Streak-breasted honeyeater | eastern Lesser Sunda Islands (Timor and Semau) |
| | Meliphaga fordiana | Kimberley honeyeater | northwestern Australia (northwestern Kimberley region, northern Western Australia) |
| | Meliphaga albilineata | White-lined honeyeater | north-central Australia (Arnhem Land sandstone, northern Northern Territory) |
| | Meliphaga chrysogenys | Orange-cheeked honeyeater | west-central New Guinea (timberline zone of Snow Mountains) |
| | Meliphaga montana | Forest honeyeater | north to southeast New Guinea |
| | Meliphaga mimikae | Mottle-breasted honeyeater | montane west-central to southeastern New Guinea |
| | Meliphaga flavirictus | Yellow-gaped honeyeater | northeast Western Australia to northeast Queensland (north Australia) |
| | Meliphaga orientalis | Mountain honeyeater | montane New Guinea |
| | Meliphaga albonotata | Scrub honeyeater | foothills of southern New Guinea |
| | Meliphaga analoga | Mimic honeyeater | New Guinea including western Papuan islands and Aru Islands |
| | Meliphaga vicina | Tagula honeyeater | lowlands and hills of Tagula Island (Louisiade Archipelago, off southeastern New Guinea) |
| | Meliphaga gracilis | Graceful honeyeater | southern New Guinea including Aru Islands, and northeastern Australia (western Torres Strait islands and eastern Cape York Peninsula, northern Queensland) |
| | Meliphaga imitatrix | Cryptic honeyeater | northeastern Australia (southeastern Cape York Peninsula to Wet Tropics region, northern Queensland) |
| | Meliphaga cinereifrons | Elegant honeyeater | southeastern New Guinea |
