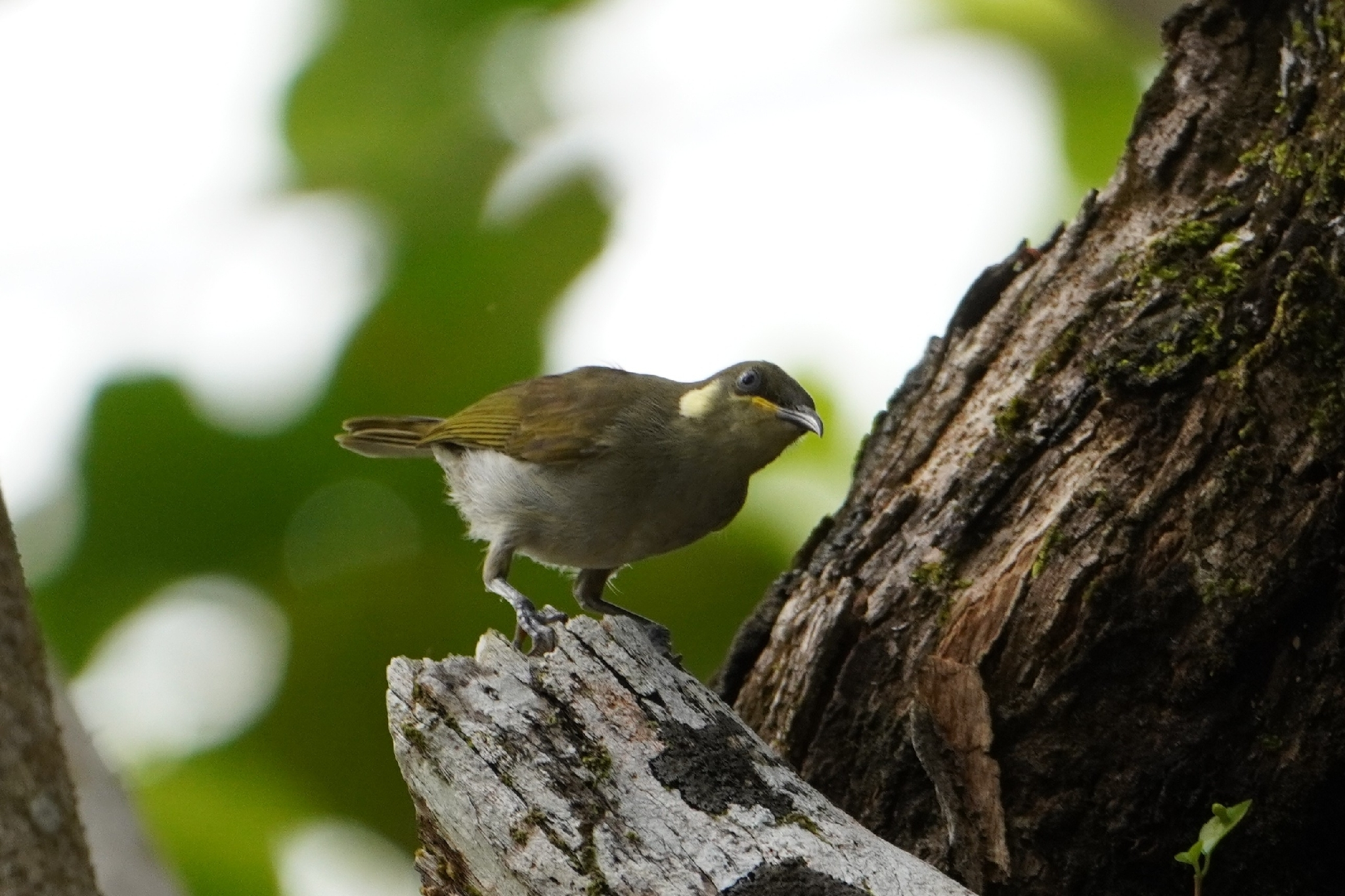

Conservation status
- Least Concern (IUCN 3.1)

Scientific classification
- Kingdom: Animalia
- Phylum: Chordata
- Class: Aves
- Order: Passeriformes
- Family: Meliphagidae
- Genus: Meliphaga
- Species: M. analoga

Binomial name
- Meliphaga analoga (Reichenbach, 1852)

Synonyms
- Microptilotis analogus

= Mimic honeyeater =

Species of bird

The mimic honeyeater (Meliphaga analoga) is a species of bird in the family Meliphagidae. It is widely spread throughout New Guinea. Its natural habitats are subtropical or tropical moist lowland forests, subtropical or tropical mangrove forests, and subtropical or tropical moist montane forests.
