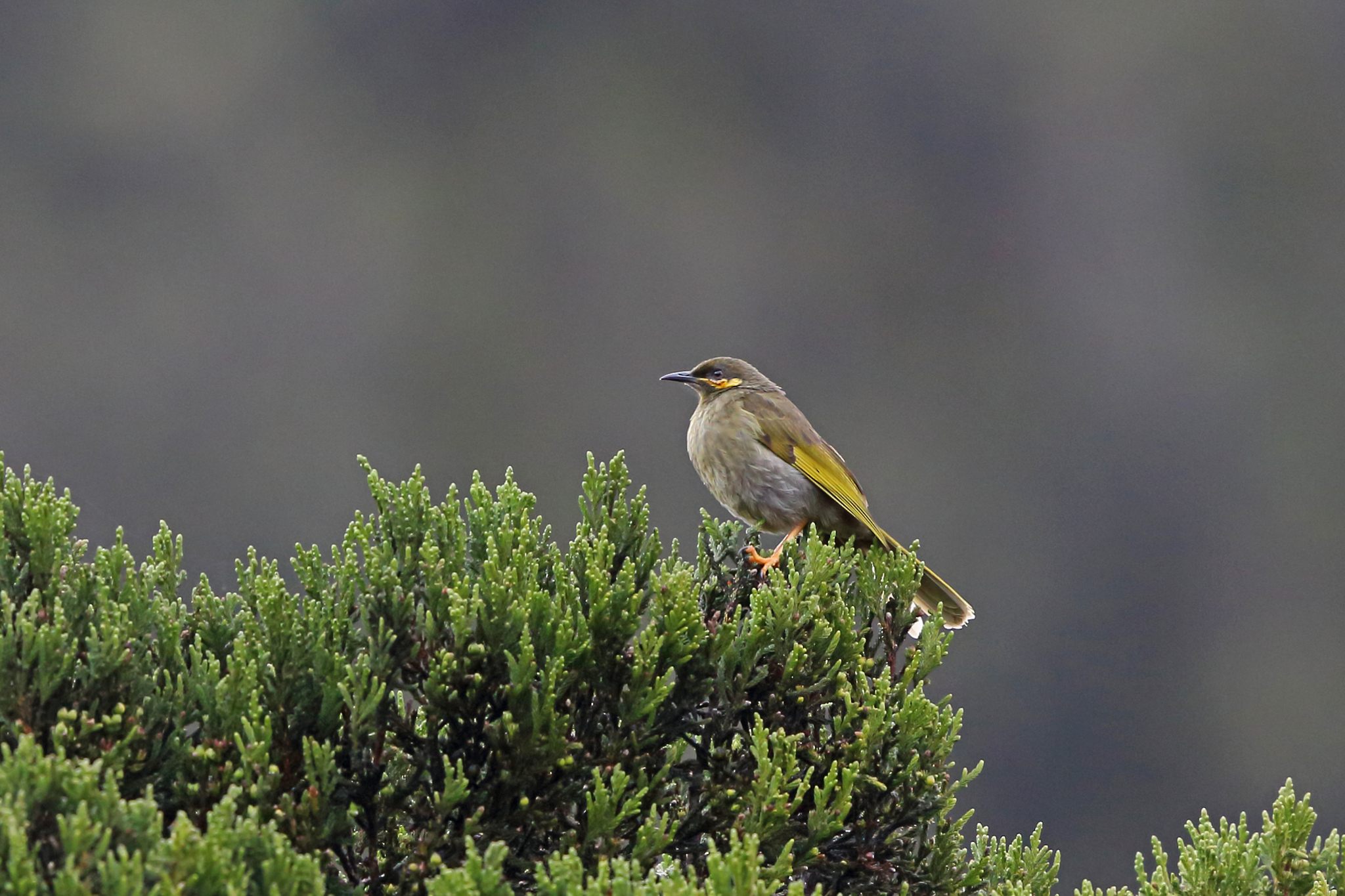

Conservation status
- Least Concern (IUCN 3.1)

Scientific classification
- Kingdom: Animalia
- Phylum: Chordata
- Class: Aves
- Order: Passeriformes
- Family: Meliphagidae
- Genus: Meliphaga van Oort, 1910
- Species: M. chrysogenys

Binomial name
- Meliphaga chrysogenys (van Oort, 1910)

Synonyms
- Oreornis chrysogenys

= Orange-cheeked honeyeater =

Species of bird

The orange-cheeked honeyeater (Meliphaga chrysogenys) is a species of bird in the family Meliphagidae. It was formerly the only species placed in the genus Oreornis. It is endemic to West Papua, Indonesia. Its natural habitat is subtropical or tropical moist montane forests.
