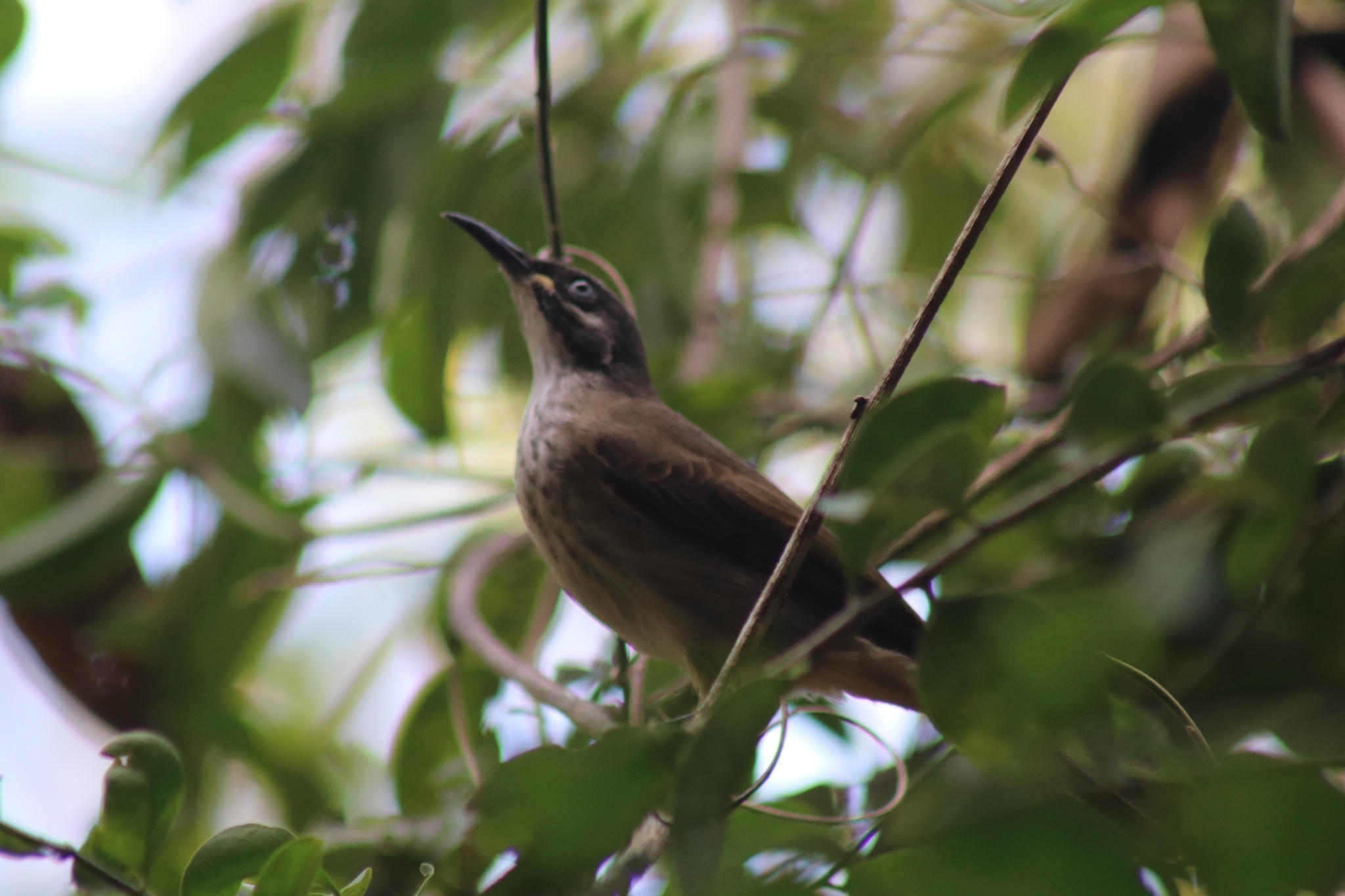

Conservation status
- Least Concern (IUCN 3.1)

Scientific classification
- Kingdom: Animalia
- Phylum: Chordata
- Class: Aves
- Order: Passeriformes
- Family: Meliphagidae
- Genus: Meliphaga
- Species: M. albilineata

Binomial name
- Meliphaga albilineata (H.L. White, 1917)

Synonyms
- Ptilotis albilineata; Territornis albilineata; Microptilotis albilineatus

= White-lined honeyeater =

Species of bird

The white-lined honeyeater (Meliphaga albilineata) is a species of bird in the family Meliphagidae. It is endemic to northern Australia. Its natural habitat is subtropical or tropical moist lowland forests. It formerly included the Kimberley honeyeater as a subspecies.
