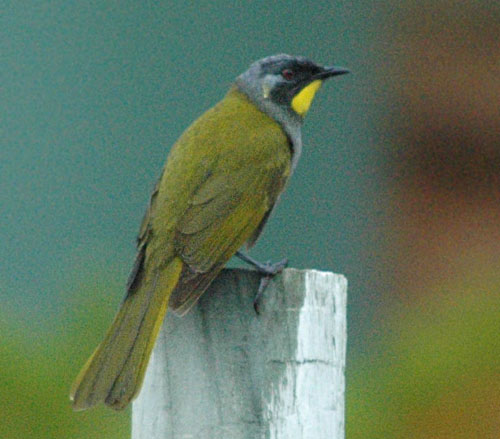

Conservation status
- Least Concern (IUCN 3.1)

Scientific classification
- Kingdom: Animalia
- Phylum: Chordata
- Class: Aves
- Order: Passeriformes
- Family: Meliphagidae
- Genus: Meliphaga
- Species: M. flavirictus

Binomial name
- Meliphaga flavirictus (Salvadori, 1880)

Synonyms
- Microptilotis flavirictus

= Yellow-gaped honeyeater =

Species of bird

The yellow-gaped honeyeater (Meliphaga flavirictus) is a species of bird in the family Meliphagidae. It is found throughout New Guinea. Its natural habitats are subtropical or tropical moist lowland forests and subtropical or tropical moist montane forests.
