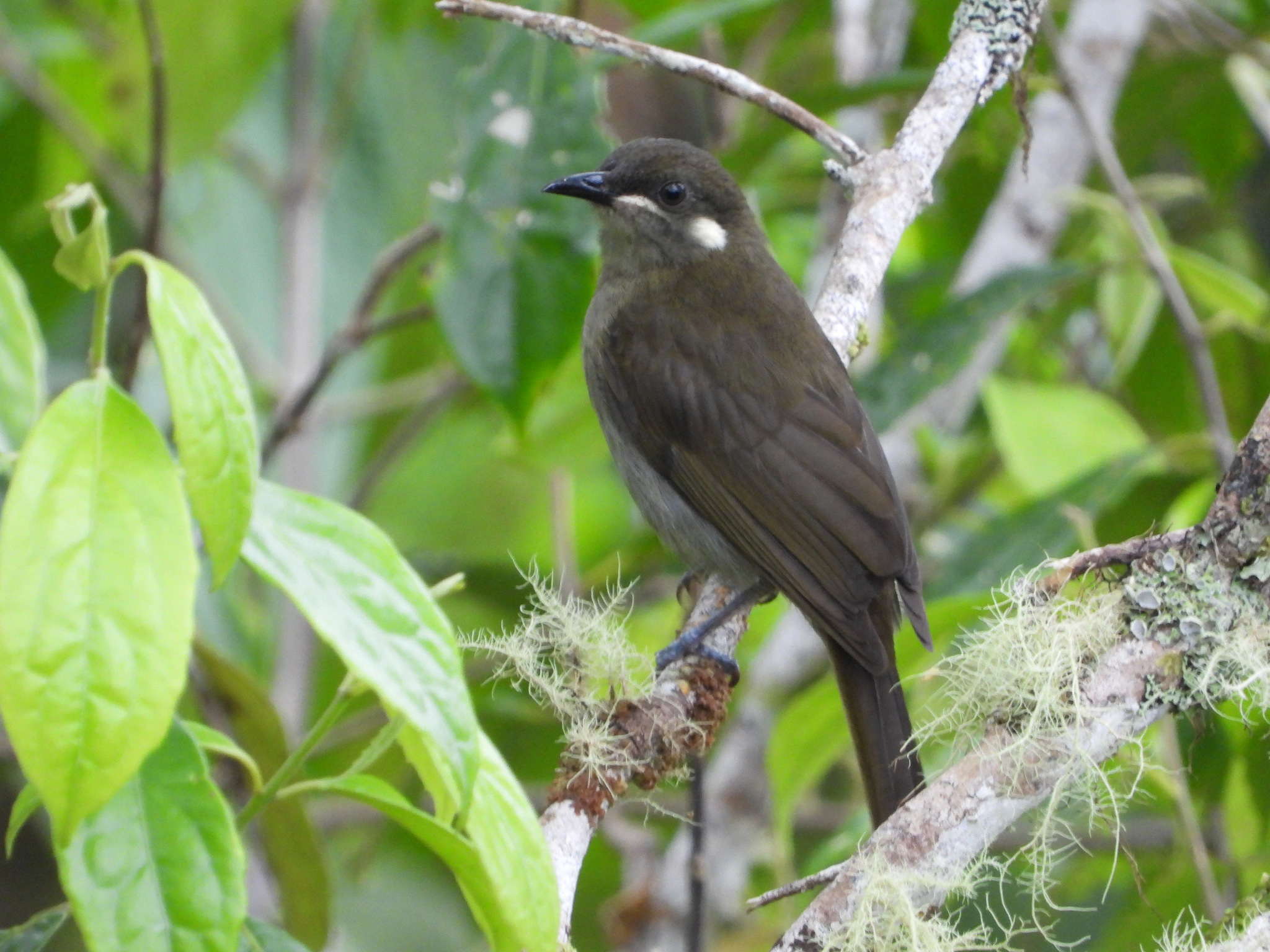

Conservation status
- Least Concern (IUCN 3.1)

Scientific classification
- Kingdom: Animalia
- Phylum: Chordata
- Class: Aves
- Order: Passeriformes
- Family: Meliphagidae
- Genus: Meliphaga
- Species: M. montana

Binomial name
- Meliphaga montana (Salvadori, 1880)

Synonyms
- Microptilotis montanus

= Forest honeyeater =

Species of bird

The forest honeyeater (Meliphaga montana) is a species of bird in the family Meliphagidae. It is found throughout New Guinea. Its natural habitats are subtropical or tropical moist lowland forest and subtropical or tropical moist montane forest.
