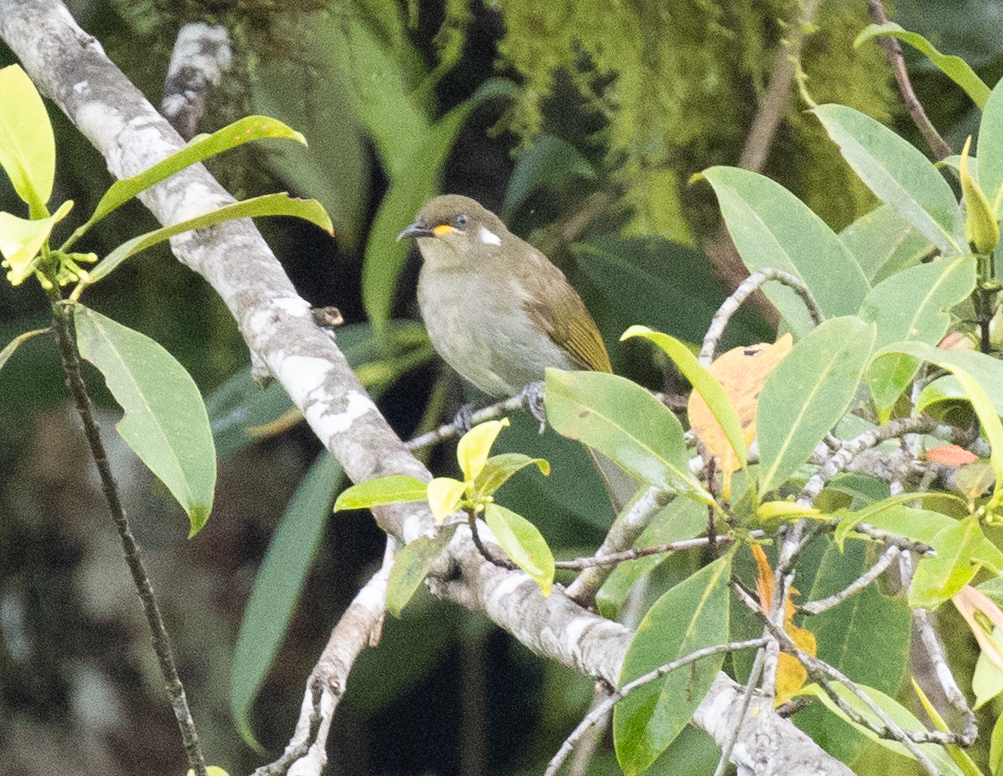

Conservation status
- Least Concern (IUCN 3.1)

Scientific classification
- Kingdom: Animalia
- Phylum: Chordata
- Class: Aves
- Order: Passeriformes
- Family: Meliphagidae
- Genus: Meliphaga
- Species: M. albonotata

Binomial name
- Meliphaga albonotata (Salvadori, 1876)

Synonyms
- Microptilotis albonotatus

= Scrub honeyeater =

Species of bird

The scrub honeyeater (Meliphaga albonotata) is a species of bird in the family Meliphagidae. It is found across New Guinea. Its natural habitats are subtropical or tropical moist lowland forests and subtropical or tropical moist montane forests.
