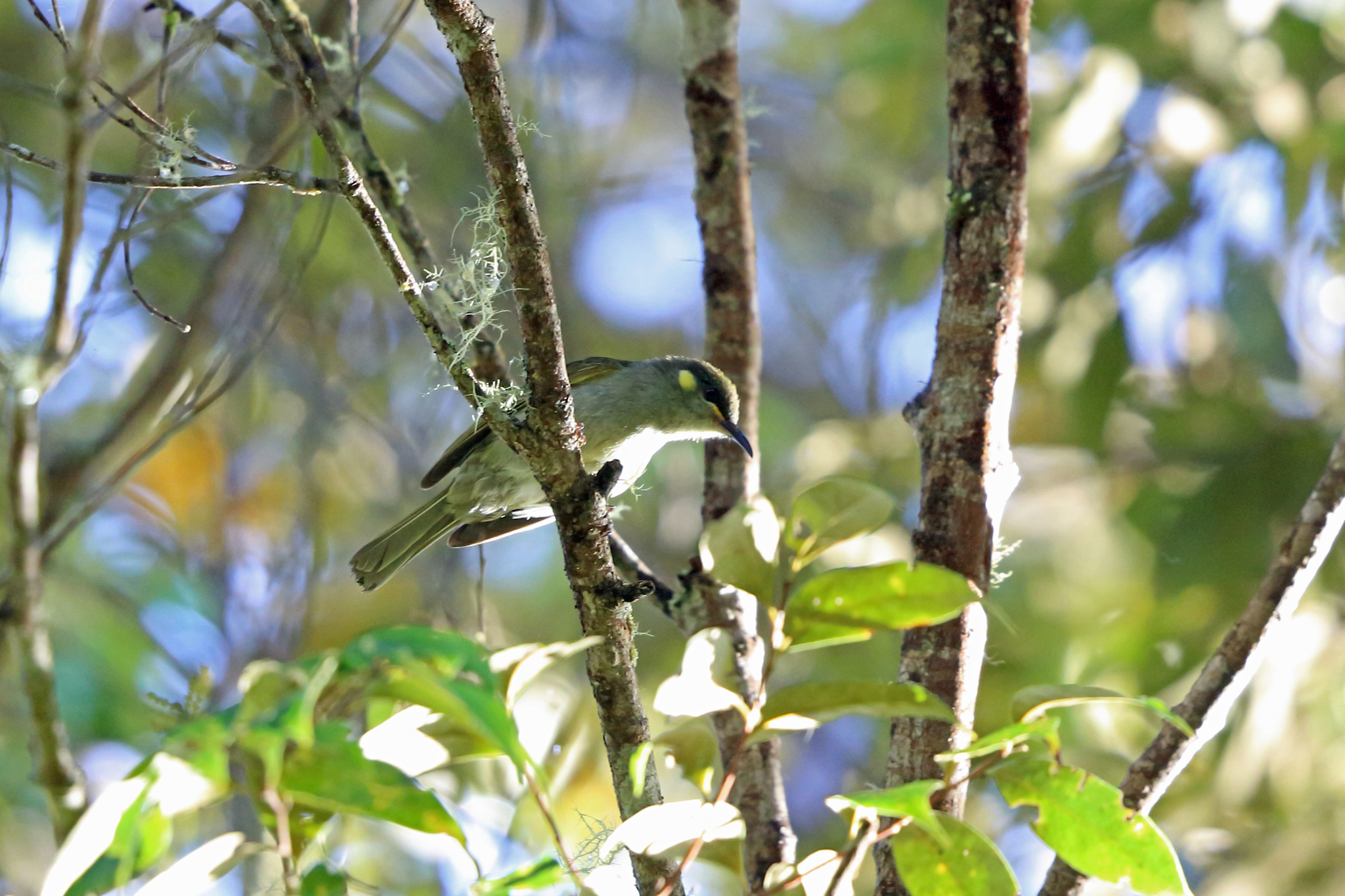

Conservation status
- Least Concern (IUCN 3.1)

Scientific classification
- Kingdom: Animalia
- Phylum: Chordata
- Class: Aves
- Order: Passeriformes
- Family: Meliphagidae
- Genus: Meliphaga
- Species: M. orientalis

Binomial name
- Meliphaga orientalis (Meyer, 1894)

= Mountain honeyeater =

Species of bird

The mountain honeyeater (Meliphaga orientalis), hill-forest honeyeater or mountain meliphaga, is a species of bird in the family Meliphagidae that is found throughout New Guinea. Its natural habitats are subtropical or tropical moist lowland forest and subtropical or tropical moist montane forest.
