= Tagula honeyeater =

Conservation status
- Least Concern (IUCN 3.1)

Scientific classification
- Kingdom: Animalia
- Phylum: Chordata
- Class: Aves
- Order: Passeriformes
- Family: Meliphagidae
- Genus: Meliphaga
- Species: M. vicina

Binomial name
- Meliphaga vicina (Rothschild & Hartert, 1912)

Synonyms
- Microptilotis vicina

Species of bird

The Tagula honeyeater (Meliphaga vicina) is a species of bird in the honeyeater family Meliphagidae. It is endemic to Tagula Island in the Louisiade Archipelago of Papua New Guinea.
