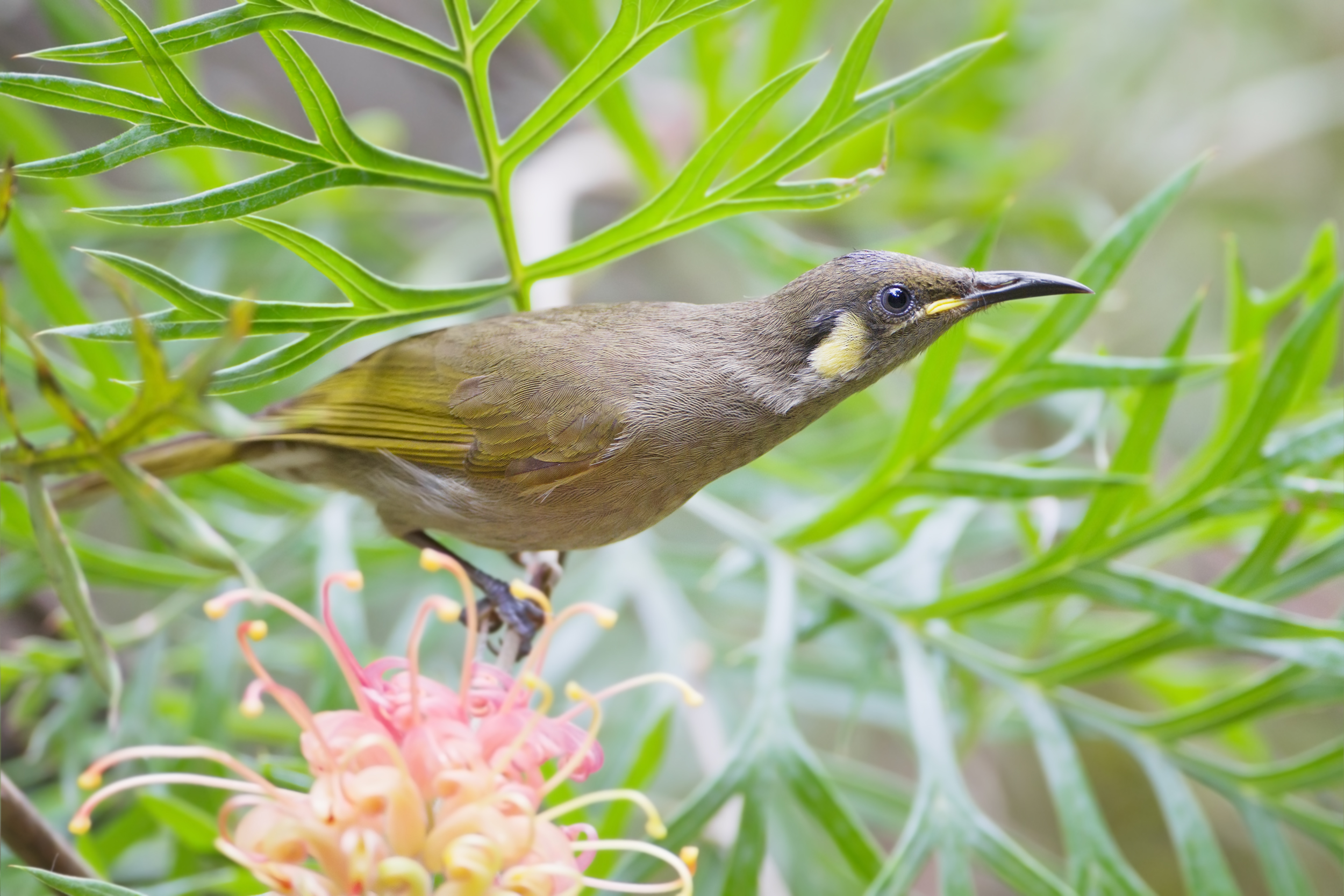

Conservation status
- Least Concern (IUCN 3.1)

Scientific classification
- Kingdom: Animalia
- Phylum: Chordata
- Class: Aves
- Order: Passeriformes
- Family: Meliphagidae
- Genus: Meliphaga
- Species: M. imitatrix

Binomial name
- Meliphaga imitatrix (Mathews, 1912)

Synonyms
- Microptilotis imitatrix

= Cryptic honeyeater =

Species of bird

The cryptic honeyeater (Meliphaga imitatrix), also known as the imitatress honeyeater, is a species of bird in the family Meliphagidae. It is found in northeastern Queensland in Australia. Its natural habitats are subtropical or tropical moist lowland forest and subtropical or tropical mangrove forest.
