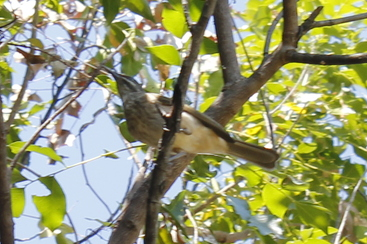

Conservation status
- Least Concern (IUCN 3.1)

Scientific classification
- Kingdom: Animalia
- Phylum: Chordata
- Class: Aves
- Order: Passeriformes
- Family: Meliphagidae
- Genus: Meliphaga
- Species: M. fordiana

Binomial name
- Meliphaga fordiana Schodde, 1989

Synonyms
- Meliphaga albilineata fordiana Schodde, 1989; Microptilotis fordianus (Schodde, 1989); Territornis fordiana

= Kimberley honeyeater =

Kimberley Honeyeater

Species of bird

The Kimberley honeyeater (Meliphaga fordiana) is a bird in the honeyeater family, Meliphagidae. It was formerly lumped with the white-lined honeyeater but, based on a genetic analysis, it is now considered a separate species. Articles published in 2014 and 2015 provided evidence that the Kimberley and white-lined honeyeaters differ not only genetically, but also in song and foraging ecology. The specific epithet honours the Australian chemist and ornithologist Dr Julian Ralph Ford (1932-1987).

== Description ==
The Kimberley honeyeater is similar in appearance to the white-lined honeyeater, having dark grey upperparts, light grey underparts, grey eyes, with dark grey below the eyes and a black beak. It is distinguished from the white-lined honeyeater by the lack of citrine edging on the upper surface of the remiges and rectrices, pale creamy-buff under-wing coverts, and a milky-white belly.

== Distribution ==
The Kimberley honeyeater is endemic to the Kimberley region of Western Australia, living in rainforests, eucalypt woodlands and paperbark forests.

It is present in the Charnley River–Artesian Range Wildlife Sanctuary, in the Kimberley region.

== Breeding ==
The Kimberley honeyeater breeds from August to January. Two pinkish eggs, spotted red or brown, are laid in a deep nest made of spiderweb and plant fibres.
