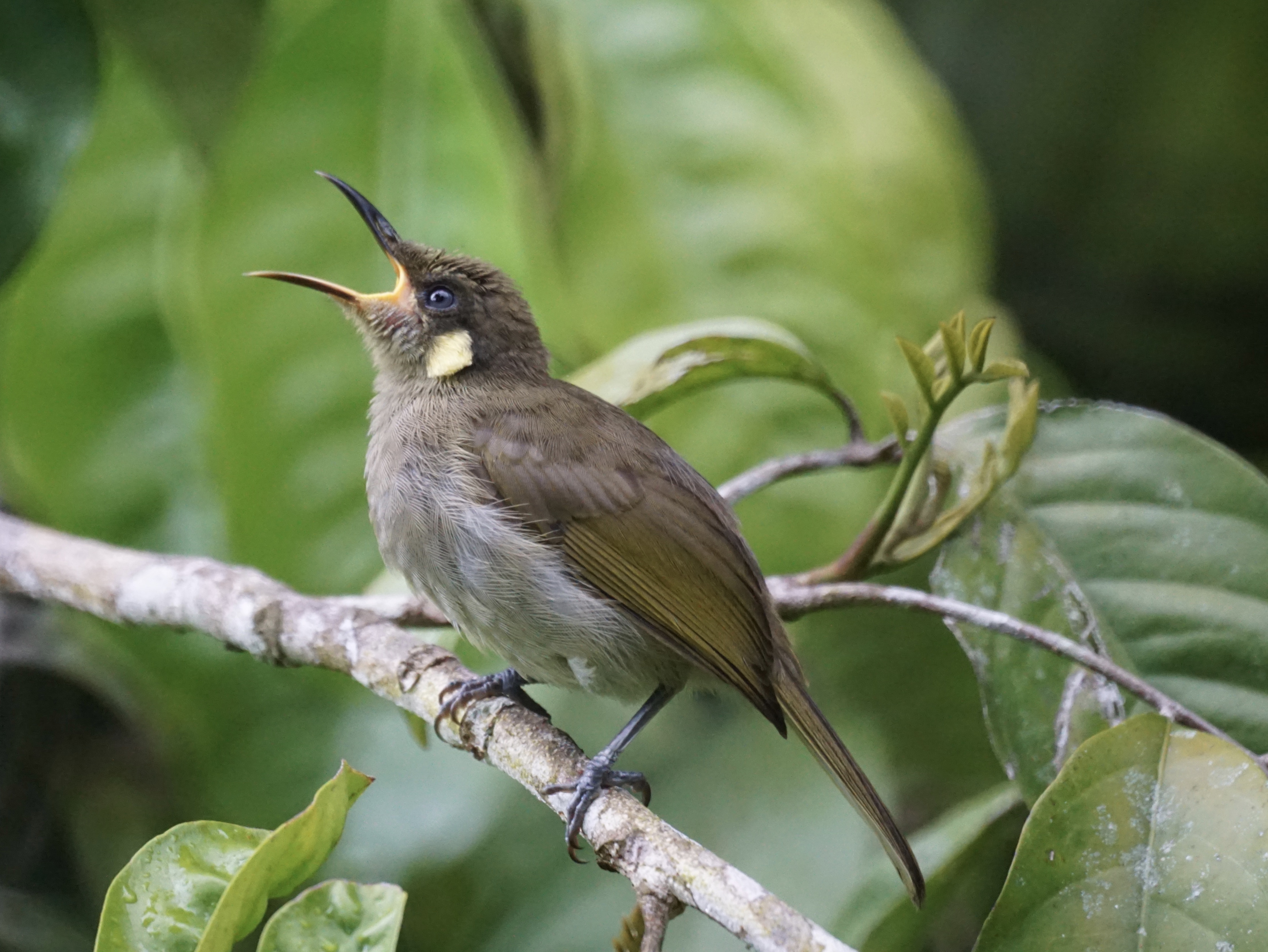

Conservation status
- Least Concern (IUCN 3.1)

Scientific classification
- Kingdom: Animalia
- Phylum: Chordata
- Class: Aves
- Order: Passeriformes
- Family: Meliphagidae
- Genus: Meliphaga
- Species: M. gracilis

Binomial name
- Meliphaga gracilis (Gould, 1866)

Synonyms
- Microptilotis gracilis

= Graceful honeyeater =

Species of bird

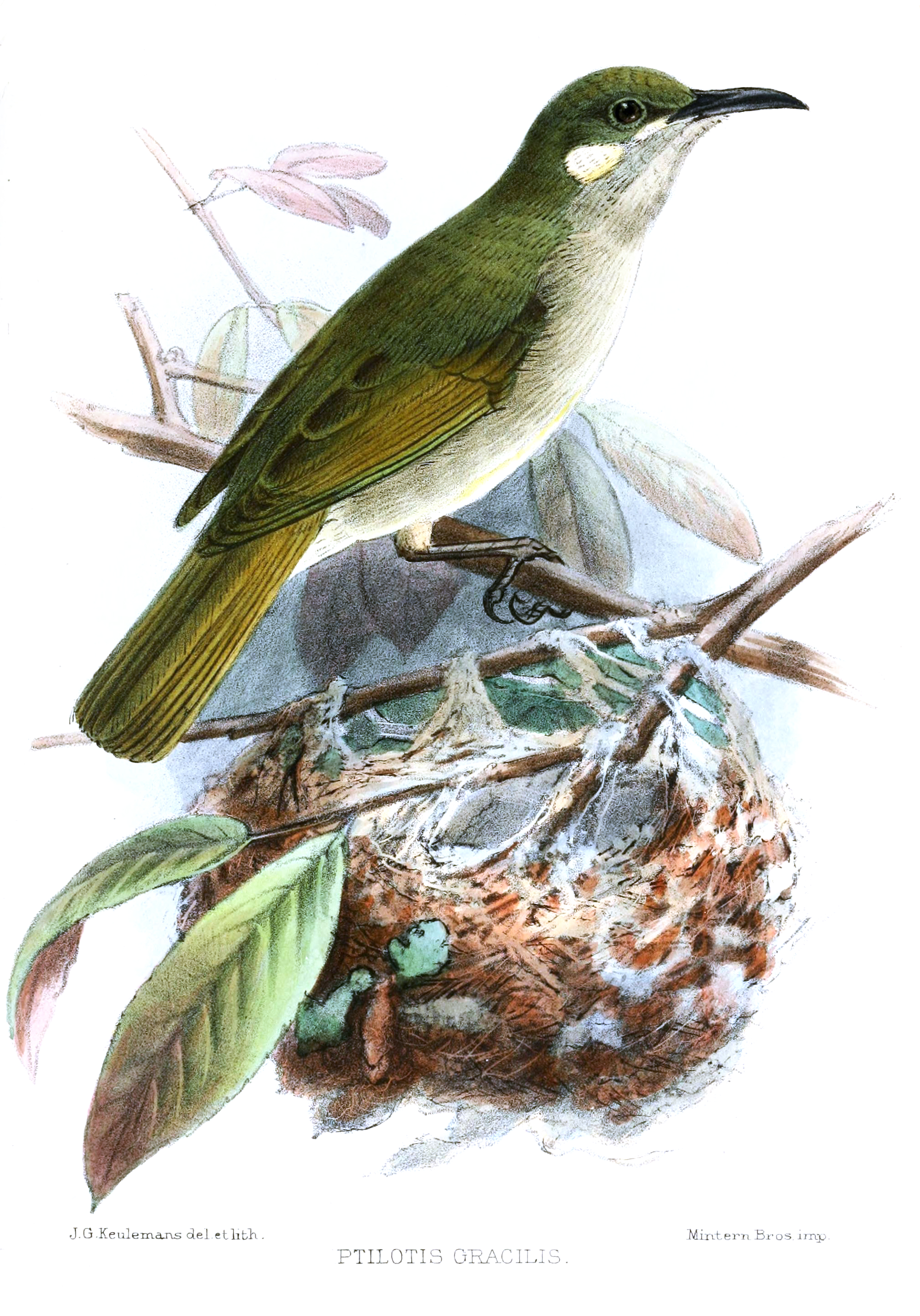

The graceful honeyeater (Meliphaga gracilis) is a species of bird in the family Meliphagidae. It is found in the Aru Islands, southern New Guinea, and Cape York Peninsula. Its natural habitats are subtropical or tropical moist lowland forest and subtropical or tropical mangrove forest.
