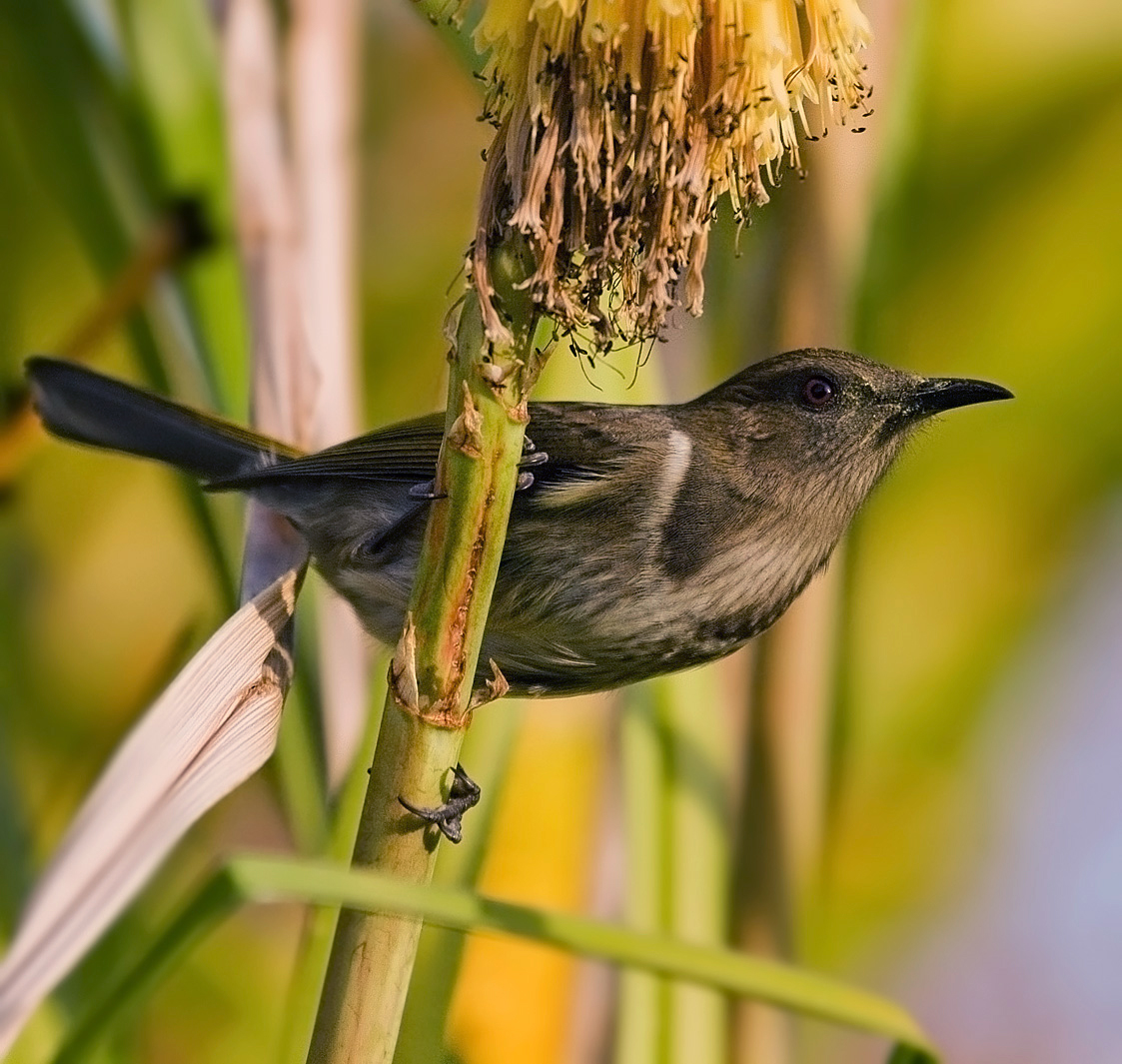
- Female crescent honeyeater (Phylidonyris pyrrhopterus)

Scientific classification
- Kingdom: Animalia
- Phylum: Chordata
- Class: Aves
- Order: Passeriformes
- Superfamily: Meliphagoidea
- Family: Meliphagidae; Vigors, 1825

Genera
- See text

= Honeyeater =

Honeyeaters

Family of birds

The honeyeaters are a large and diverse family, Meliphagidae, of small to medium-sized birds. The family includes the Australian chats, myzomelas, friarbirds, wattlebirds, miners and melidectes. They are most common in Australia and New Guinea, but can also be found in New Zealand, the Pacific islands as far east as Samoa and Tonga, and the Indonesian islands to the north and west of New Guinea known as Wallacea. Bali, on the other side of the Wallace Line, has a single species.

In total, there are 195 species in 51 genera, roughly half of them native to Australia, many of the remainder occupying New Guinea. With their closest relatives, the Maluridae (Australian fairy-wrens), Pardalotidae (pardalotes), and Acanthizidae (thornbills, Australian warblers, scrubwrens, etc.), they comprise the superfamily Meliphagoidea and originated early in the evolutionary history of the oscine passerine radiation. Although honeyeaters look and behave very much like other nectar-feeding passerines around the world (such as the sunbirds and flowerpeckers), they are not closely related, and the similarities are the consequence of convergent evolution.

The extent of the evolutionary partnership between honeyeaters and Australasian flowering plants is unknown, but likely substantial. A great many Australian plants are fertilized by honeyeaters via pollination, particularly the Proteaceae, Myrtaceae, and Ericaceae. It is known that the honeyeaters are important in New Zealand (see Anthornis) as well, and assumed that the same applies in other areas.

== Description ==
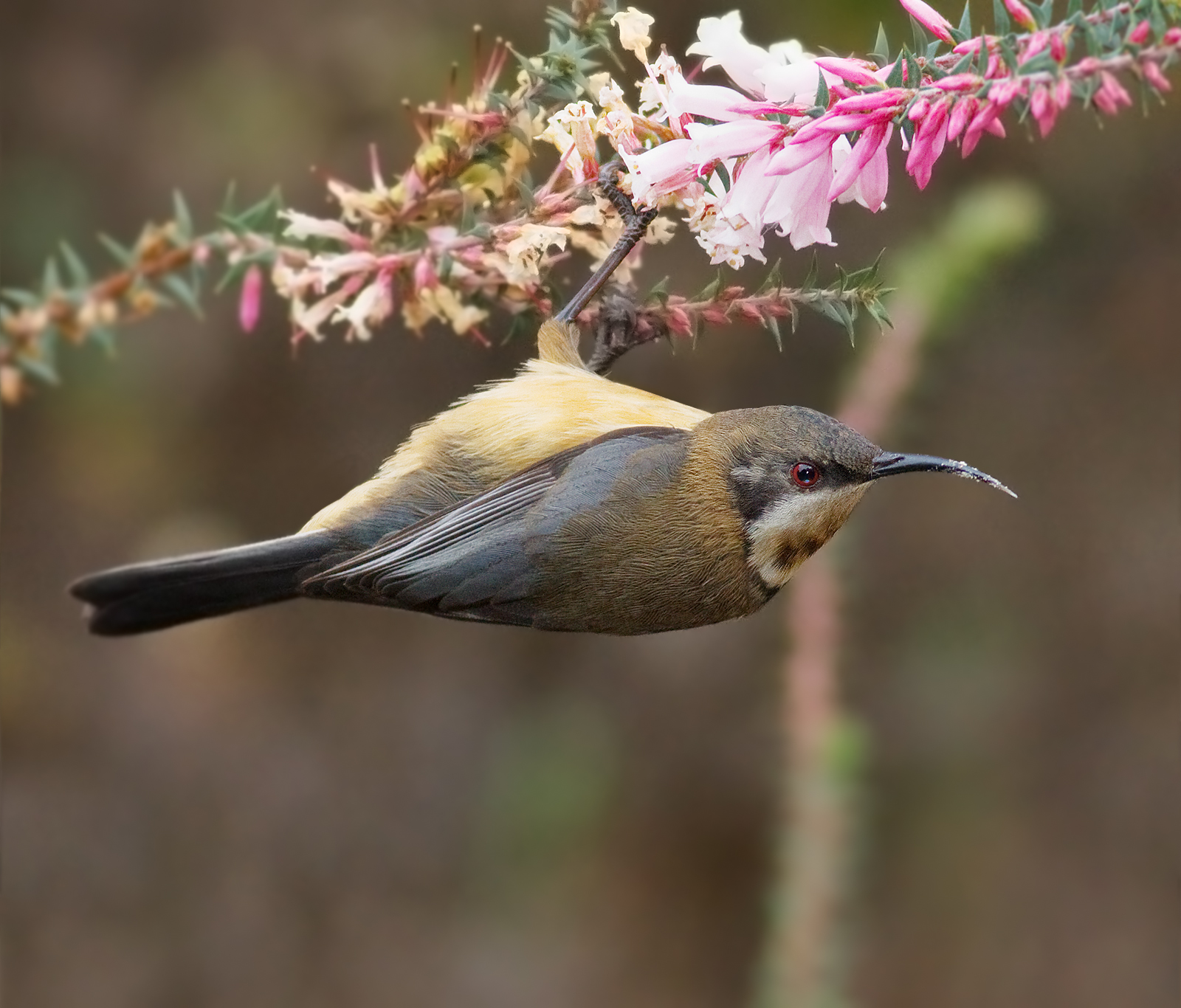
A female eastern spinebill feeding. Honeyeaters typically hang from branches while feeding on nectar.

Honeyeaters can be either nectarivorous, insectivorous, frugivorous, or a combination of nectar- and insect-eating. Unlike the hummingbirds of America, honeyeaters do not have extensive adaptations for hovering flight, though smaller members of the family do hover hummingbird-style to collect nectar from time to time. In general, honeyeaters prefer to flit quickly from perch to perch in the outer foliage, stretching up or sideways or hanging upside down at need. Many genera have a highly developed brush-tipped tongue, frayed and fringed with bristles which soak up liquids readily. The tongue is flicked rapidly and repeatedly into a flower, the upper mandible then compressing any liquid out when the bill is closed.

In addition to nectar, all or nearly all honeyeaters take insects and other small creatures, usually by hawking, sometimes by gleaning. A few of the larger species, notably the white-eared honeyeater, and the strong-billed honeyeater of Tasmania, probe under bark for insects and other morsels. Many species supplement their diets with a little fruit, and a small number eat considerable amounts of fruit, particularly in tropical rainforests and semi-arid scrubland. The painted honeyeater is a mistletoe specialist. In general, the honeyeaters with long, fine bills are more nectarivorous, the shorter-billed species less so, but even specialised nectar eaters like the spinebills take extra insects to add protein to their diet when breeding.

The movements of honeyeaters are poorly understood. Most are at least partially mobile but many movements seem to be local, possibly between favourite haunts as the conditions change. Fluctuations in local abundance are common, but the small number of definitely migratory honeyeater species aside, the reasons are yet to be discovered. Many follow the flowering of favourite food plants. Arid zone species appear to travel further and less predictably than those of the more fertile areas. It seems probable that no single explanation will emerge.

== Taxonomy and systematics ==
The genera Cleptornis (golden honeyeater) and Apalopteron (Bonin honeyeater), formerly treated in the Meliphagidae, have recently been transferred to the Zosteropidae on genetic evidence. The genus Notiomystis (New Zealand stitchbird), formerly classified in the Meliphagidae, has recently been removed to the newly erected Notiomystidae of which it is the only member. The "Macgregor's bird-of-paradise", historically considered a bird-of-paradise (Paradisaeidae), was recently found to be a honeyeater. It is now known as "MacGregor's honeyeater" and is classified in the Meliphagidae.

The wattled smoky honeyeater (Melipotes carolae), described in 2007, had been discovered in December 2005 in the Foja Mountains of Papua, Indonesia.

In 2008, a study that included molecular phylogenetic analysis of museum specimens in the genera Moho and Chaetoptila, both extinct genera endemic to the Hawaiian islands, argued that these five species were not members of the Meliphagidae and instead belong to their own distinct family, the Mohoidae.
