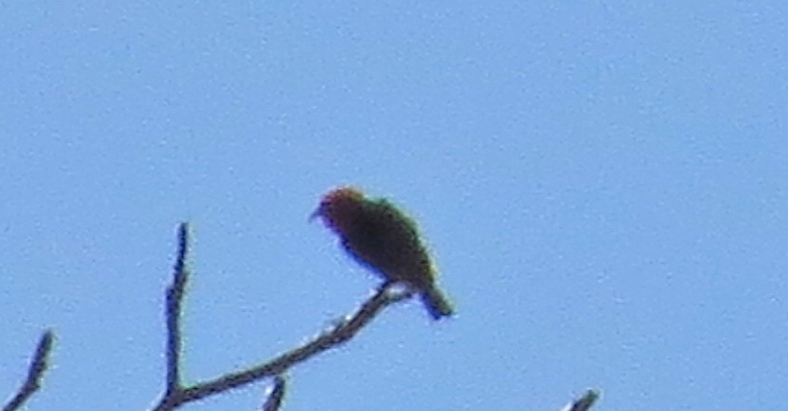

Conservation status
- Least Concern (IUCN 3.1)

Scientific classification
- Kingdom: Animalia
- Phylum: Chordata
- Class: Aves
- Order: Passeriformes
- Family: Meliphagidae
- Genus: Myzomela
- Species: M. dammermani

Binomial name
- Myzomela dammermani Siebers, 1928

Synonyms
- Myzomela erythrocephala dammermani

= Sumba myzomela =

Species of bird

The Sumba myzomela (Myzomela dammermani) is a species of bird in the family Meliphagidae. It is endemic to Sumba in the western Lesser Sunda Islands of Indonesia, where it is found in forest with a significant component of deciduous trees.

== Taxonomy ==
The Sumba myzomela was initially described as a subspecies of the red-headed myzomela in 1928, but differences between the two species were discussed by taxonomists as early as the late 1950s and the two are now universally considered distinct species. The Rote myzomela was previously considered a population of this species due to similarities in their plumage, but was described as a separate species in 2017.

Phylogenetic studies suggest that the species is most closely related to the red-headed, black-breasted, Wetar, and Papuan black myzomelas.

== Description ==
The Sumba myzomela is a small honeyeater with a short, curved bill. Adults reach an average length of 11 cm. Adult males have a distinctive bright black-and-red plumage. The head and neck are dark red, separated sharply from the black mantle and breast band. There is a narrow black loral stripe, broadening into a narrow ring around the eye. The back, scapulars, and upperwing are also blackish, with the pale greyish edges to the remiges and coverts forming a pale panel when the wing is folded. The underside of the wing is white with a dark grey edge and tip. The blackish breast band extends to front of the flanks, while the rest of the underparts are greyish-black. The rump and uppertail coverts are dark red, while the undertail is dark gray. Females are much more drab than males, with gray-brown upperparts and somewhat paler underparts, as well as a pale red tinge from the chin to the forecrown.

The Sumba myzomela is similar in appearance to several other Indonesian myzomelas, with females in particular impossible to differentiate based on appearance. However, it is the only species of myzomela to occur on Sumba and so is distinctive within its range.

== Distribution and habitat ==
The myzomela is endemic to Sumba, where it is found widely across the island in a range of forested habitats. The species prefers primary forest with deciduous trees, high tree density, level terrain, and an abundance of paths, but also occurs in evergreen Acacia forests and forest edge. Found at elevations of up to 930 m. The species may move locally based on the abundance of flowering plants.

== Behaviour and ecology ==
Most aspects of this myzomela's ecology are poorly known due to its previous status as a subspecies. It forages in flowering trees in flocks of up to seven birds, mainly in the canopy but also regularly descending to the mid-level strata. Information about breeding in the species is completely lacking.

== Status ==
The Sumba myzomela is classified as being of least concern by the IUCN. Its population is estimated to number 129,600 individuals.
