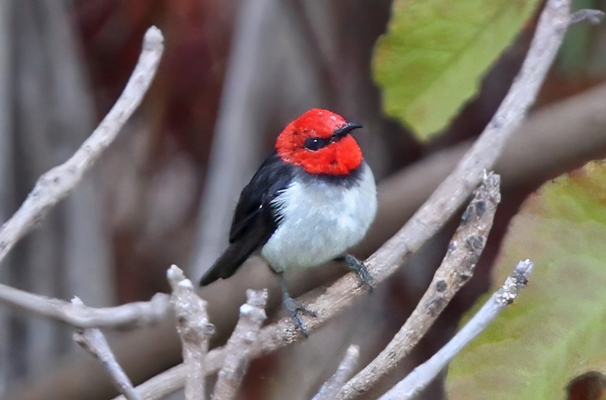

Conservation status
- Not evaluated (IUCN 3.1)

Scientific classification
- Kingdom: Animalia
- Phylum: Chordata
- Class: Aves
- Order: Passeriformes
- Family: Meliphagidae
- Genus: Myzomela
- Species: M. babarensis

Binomial name
- Myzomela babarensis Berryman, Spencer, Sharma & Eaton, 2025

= Babar myzomela =

Species of bird

The Babar myzomela (Myzomela babarensis) is a species of bird in the family Meliphagidae. It is endemic to the island of Babar in Indonesia. It was described by Alex Berryman, Andrew Spencer, Puja Sharma and James Eaton in 2025. It is monotypic.

== Etymology ==
The genus name Myzomela is derived from two Greek words: μυζαω (muzaō): to suck and μελι (meli): honey. The specific epithet babarensis refers to the island of Babar, where it is found.

== Taxonomy and systematics ==
This species was formerly considered conspecific with the Banda Islands myzomela. It was separated from the Banda Islands myzomela by a combination of plumage, vocalizations and morphology.

== Description ==
This species is the only myzomela in its native range; thus, it is unlikely to be confused. The female plumage does not differ between the three species of the Myzomela boiei group. The male has a narrower breast band and paler underparts compared to the Banda Islands myzomela. It is larger and has more scarlet red in the upperparts compared to the Tanimbar myzomela.
