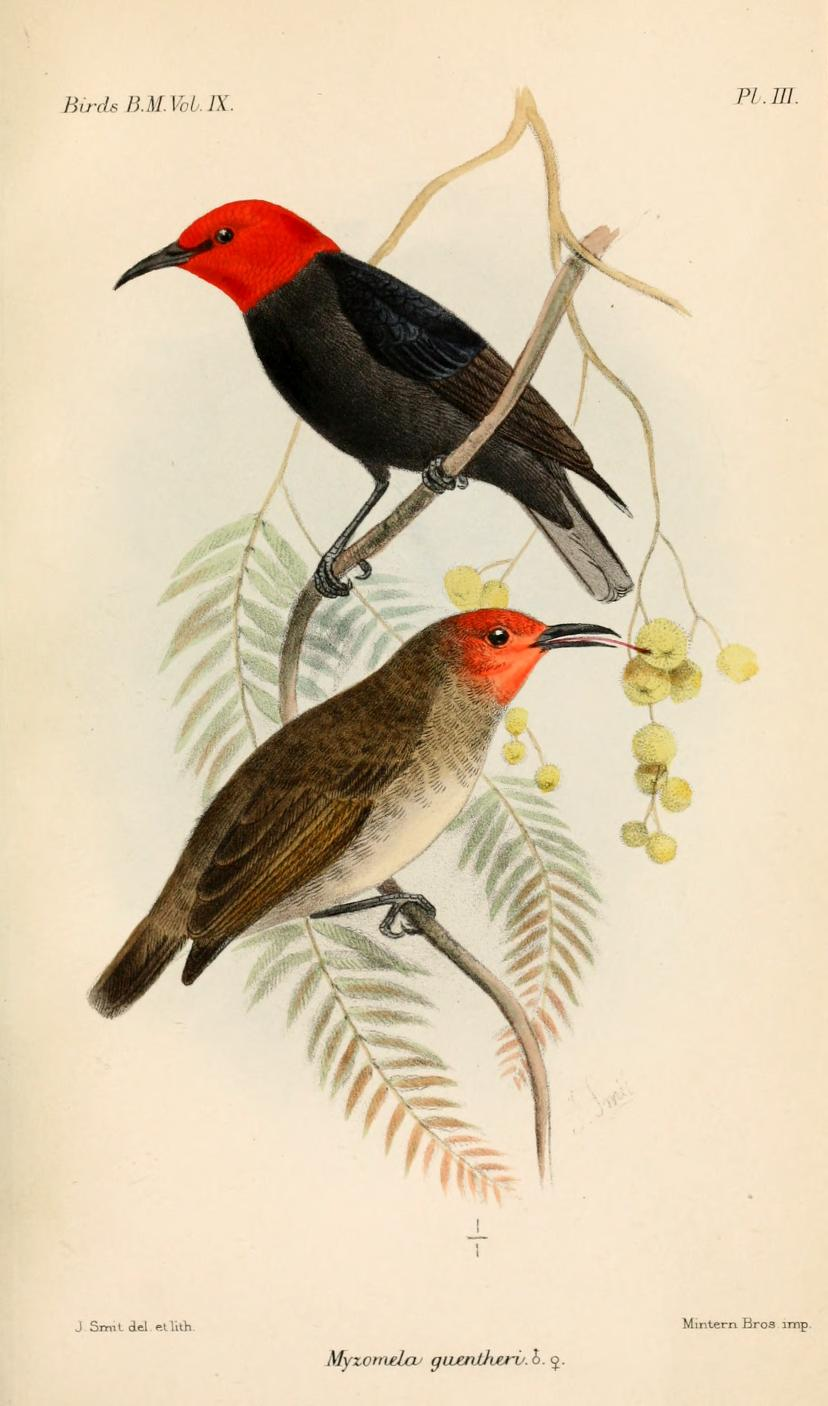
- Illustration by Joseph Smit, 1884

Conservation status
- Least Concern (IUCN 3.1)

Scientific classification
- Kingdom: Animalia
- Phylum: Chordata
- Class: Aves
- Order: Passeriformes
- Family: Meliphagidae
- Genus: Myzomela
- Species: M. erythromelas

Binomial name
- Myzomela erythromelas Salvadori, 1881

Synonyms
- Myzomela guentheri

= Black-bellied myzomela =

Species of bird

The black-bellied myzomela (Myzomela erythromelas), also known as the splendid myzomela, is a species of bird in the family Meliphagidae. It is endemic to the large island of New Britain, near New Guinea. Its natural habitat is subtropical or tropical moist lowland forests. An adult is 9 to 10 cm (3.5 to 3.9 in), males weigh 7 to 9 g (0.25 to 0.32 oz) while females weigh 6.5 to 7.5 g (0.23 to 0.26 oz). Males have predominantly black plumage with a scarlet red hood. Females are slightly smaller than males with a mainly olive colored plumage and a red mask covering the forehead. Both male and females have a black bill. Black-bellied myzomela feed on nectar, often in small parties. It has also been recorded to forage with other species like ashy myzomela and red myzomela.
