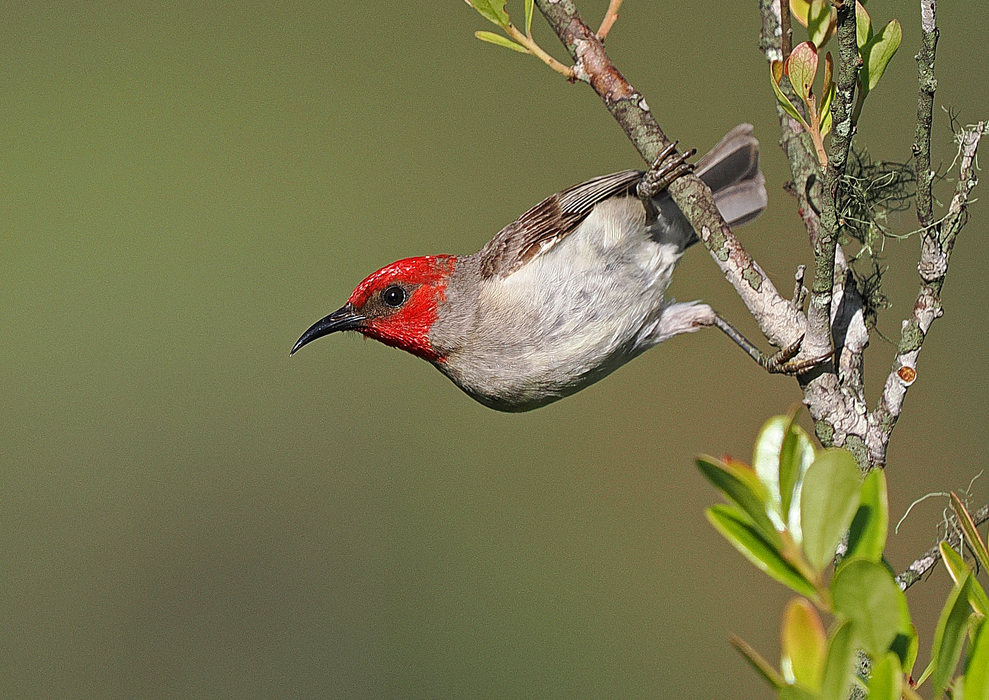

Conservation status
- Vulnerable (IUCN 3.1)

Scientific classification
- Kingdom: Animalia
- Phylum: Chordata
- Class: Aves
- Order: Passeriformes
- Family: Meliphagidae
- Genus: Myzomela
- Species: M. prawiradilagae

Binomial name
- Myzomela prawiradilagae Irham, Ashari, Suparno, Trainor, Verbelen, Wu, MY & Rheindt, 2019

= Alor myzomela =

Species of bird

The Alor myzomela (Myzomela prawiradilagae) is a species of bird in the family Meliphagidae, the honeyeaters. It is endemic to the Indonesian island of Alor, where it is the island's only representative member of the genus Myzomela. It is named after Dewi Malia Prawiradilaga, an ornithologist at the Indonesian Institute of Science and one of the first leading female Indonesian ornithologists.

== Taxonomy ==
It closely resembles and is most closely related to the Wetar myzomela (M. kuehni) of the adjacent island of Wetar. However, it noticeably differs in its calls and morphology.

== Distribution ==
The Alor myzomela is restricted to a few montane areas of Alor Island, where it lives in Eucalyptus woodlands primarily composed of white gum (Eucalyptus alba) and Timor mountain gum (Eucalyptus urophylla), as well as wattles (Acacia sp.) and sheoak (Casuarina junghuhniana). This restricted distribution is in contrast to its close relative M. kuehni, which is among the most common birds on its islands; this difference may be due to the different habitat requirements of the two species.

== Diet ==
They have been observed feeding on the fruit of Himalayan chokeberry (Photinia integrifolia) in small groups along with ashy-bellied white-eyes (Zosterops citrinellus). They also feed on the flowers of Eucalyptus alba, as well as occasionally insects.

== Threats ==
This species is at high risk due to its restricted distribution, where its habitat continues to shrink due to deforestation. Its population, as of 2022, is 3,000 – 12,000 mature individuals and believed to be decreasing. It is currently classified as Vulnerable on the IUCN Red List.
