= Rote myzomela =

Scientific classification
- Kingdom: Animalia
- Phylum: Chordata
- Class: Aves
- Order: Passeriformes
- Family: Meliphagidae
- Genus: Myzomela
- Species: M. irianawidodoae

Binomial name
- Myzomela irianawidodoae Prawiladilaga et al., 2017

Species of bird

The Rote myzomela (Myzomela irianawidodoae) is a species of Indonesian honeyeater endemic to the island of Rote. It is considered distinct from the Sumba myzomela based on voice. It was named after Iriana Joko Widodo, the first lady of Indonesia at the time of description. It has a scarlet head and nape, as well as lower back and tail, and a dark grey upper back and light grey stomach. It is threatened by habitat loss.
