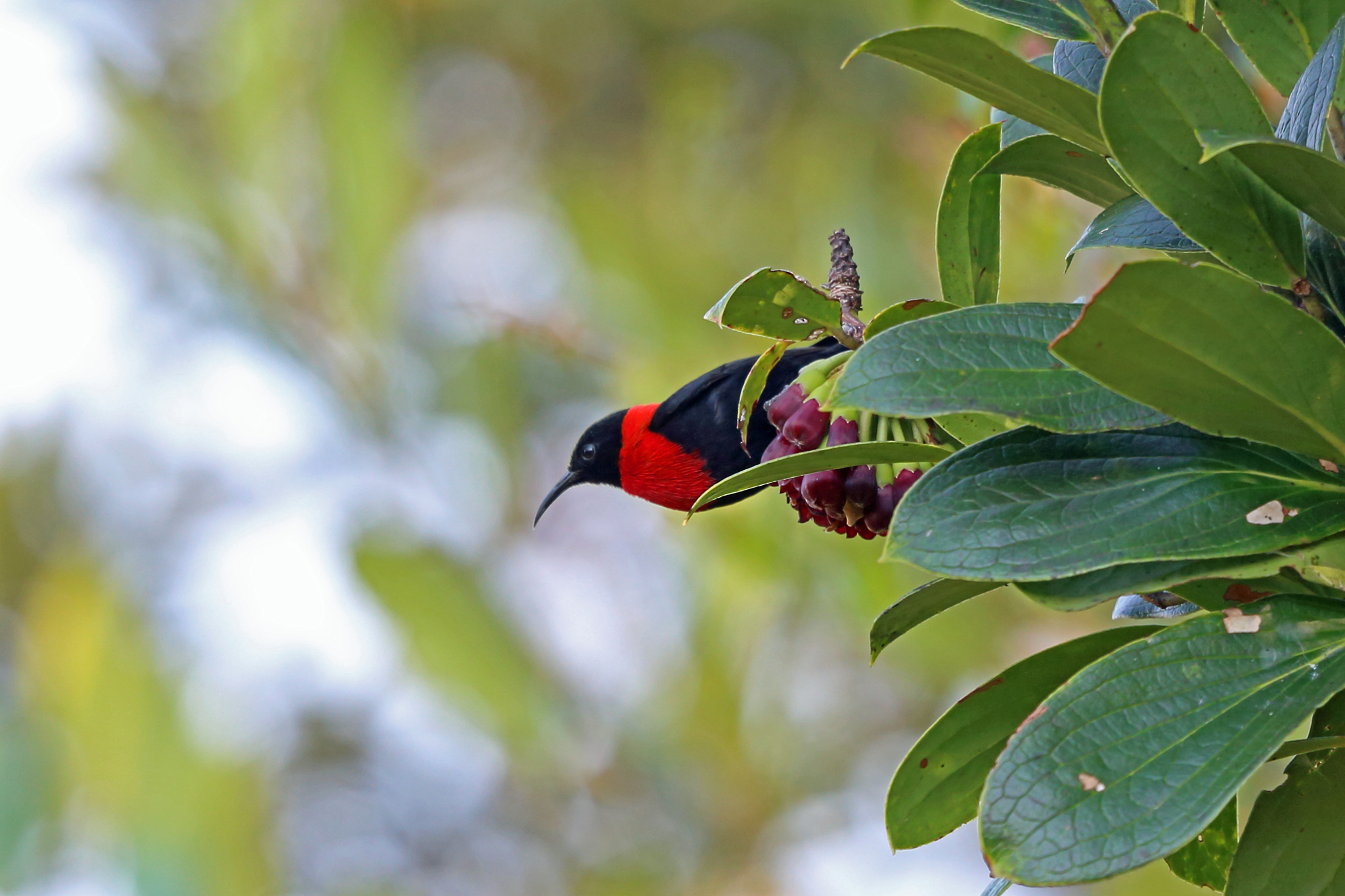

Conservation status
- Least Concern (IUCN 3.1)

Scientific classification
- Kingdom: Animalia
- Phylum: Chordata
- Class: Aves
- Order: Passeriformes
- Family: Meliphagidae
- Genus: Myzomela
- Species: M. rosenbergii

Binomial name
- Myzomela rosenbergii Schlegel, 1871

= Red-collared myzomela =

Species of bird

The red-collared myzomela (Myzomela rosenbergii) is a species of bird in the family Meliphagidae. It is found in New Guinea. The long-billed myzomela (M. longirostris) of Goodenough Island was formerly considered conspecific, but was split as a distinct species by the IOC in 2021.

Its natural habitat is subtropical or tropical moist montane forests.
