= Tanimbar myzomela =

Scientific classification
- Kingdom: Animalia
- Phylum: Chordata
- Class: Aves
- Order: Passeriformes
- Family: Meliphagidae
- Genus: Myzomela
- Species: M. annabellae

Binomial name
- Myzomela annabellae Sclater, 1883

Synonyms
- Myzomela boiei annabellae

Species of bird

The Tanimbar myzomela (Myzomela annabellae) is a species of bird in the family Meliphagidae. It is endemic to the islands of Yamdena and Selaru in the Tanimbar Islands in Indonesia. It was described by Philip Lutley Sclater in 1883. It is monotypic.

== Taxonomy and systematics ==
This species was formerly considered conspecific with the Banda myzomela. It was separated from the Banda myzomela by a combination of plumage, vocalizations and morphology.

== Description ==
This species is the only myzomela in its native range; thus, it is unlikely to be confused. The females of the three species in the boiei complex differ very little in plumage, but the male has a narrower breast band with more olive underneath.

== Habits and habitat ==
It is found in primary forest and lowlands, at least up to 70 m (230 ft).
