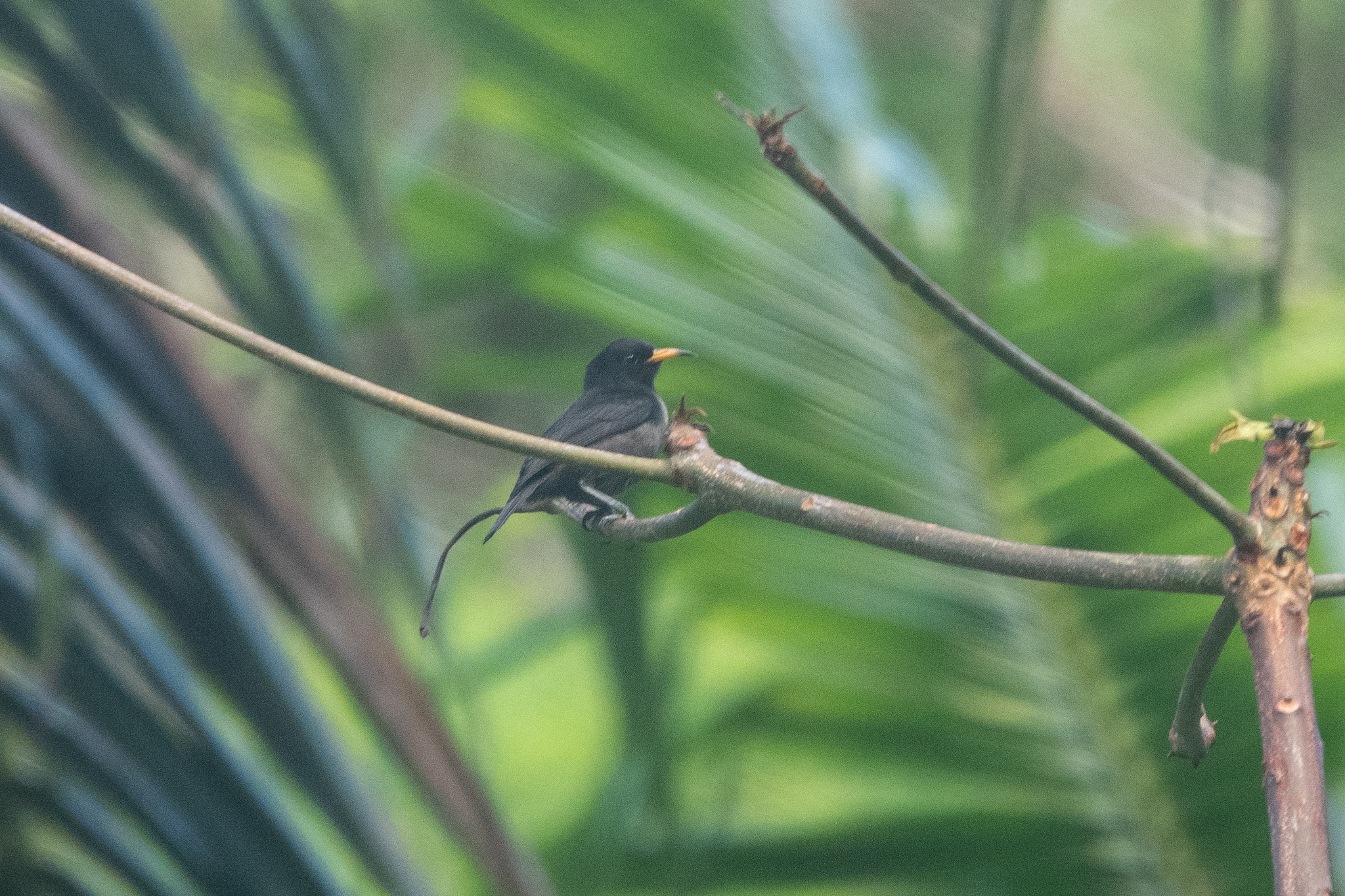
- Immature sooty myzomela

Conservation status
- Least Concern (IUCN 3.1)

Scientific classification
- Kingdom: Animalia
- Phylum: Chordata
- Class: Aves
- Order: Passeriformes
- Family: Meliphagidae
- Genus: Myzomela
- Species: M. tristrami

Binomial name
- Myzomela tristrami Ramsay, 1881

= Sooty myzomela =

Species of bird

The sooty myzomela (Myzomela tristrami), or Tristam's myzomela, is a species of bird in the family Meliphagidae, the honeyeaters. It is endemic to Makira, part of the Solomon Islands. They live in the subtropical to tropical moist forests.

Overall, they are mostly black and grey, though the beak of immature birds is yellow with a black tip.

== Etymology ==
The genus name, Myzomela, comes from the Ancient Greek μυζαω (muzaō), meaning "to suck", and μελι (meli), meaning "honey". The specific epithet, tristrami is an honorific to Henry Baker Tristram (1822–1906), a traveller, naturalist, antiquarian, and early supporter of Darwin.

== Habitat and ecology ==
Endemic to the Solomon Islands, specifically Makira, the sooty myzomela has an extent of occurrence of 5,200 km^{2} (1,300,000 acres). They mostly live in subtropical to tropical moist forests, though some other habitats are suitable. They are non-migratory.

The mature population size is unknown, but the species is thought to be abundant. Additionally, due to a lack of evidence for threats or any declines, the population size is thought to be stable.

Their trophic level is that of an herbivore, and their trophic niche is that of a nectarivore (nectar-eater).

They reach reproductive age at 1.1 years and then live, on average, to 2.5 years, though some specimens have lived to 9 years old.

== Description ==
The dominant colors of the sooty myzomela are black and grey, with some white. In direct sunlight, the wing and tail feathers have a bluish-green tinge. The juveniles have a fleshy yellow beak with a black tip, which turns fully black in adults.

The sooty myzomela is not to be confused with the immature cardinal myzomela; they lack reddish tones in their plumage.

From beak-tip to tail-tip, they measure 11–12 cm (4.3–4.7 in). They weigh 14.4–14.5 g (0.51–0.51 oz). Their wingspan is 12.8 cm (5.0 in). The length of their legs is 1.83 cm (0.72 in). The length of their beak is 1.22 cm (0.48 in), with width and height being 0.29 cm (0.11 in) and 0.34 cm (0.13 in), respectively.
