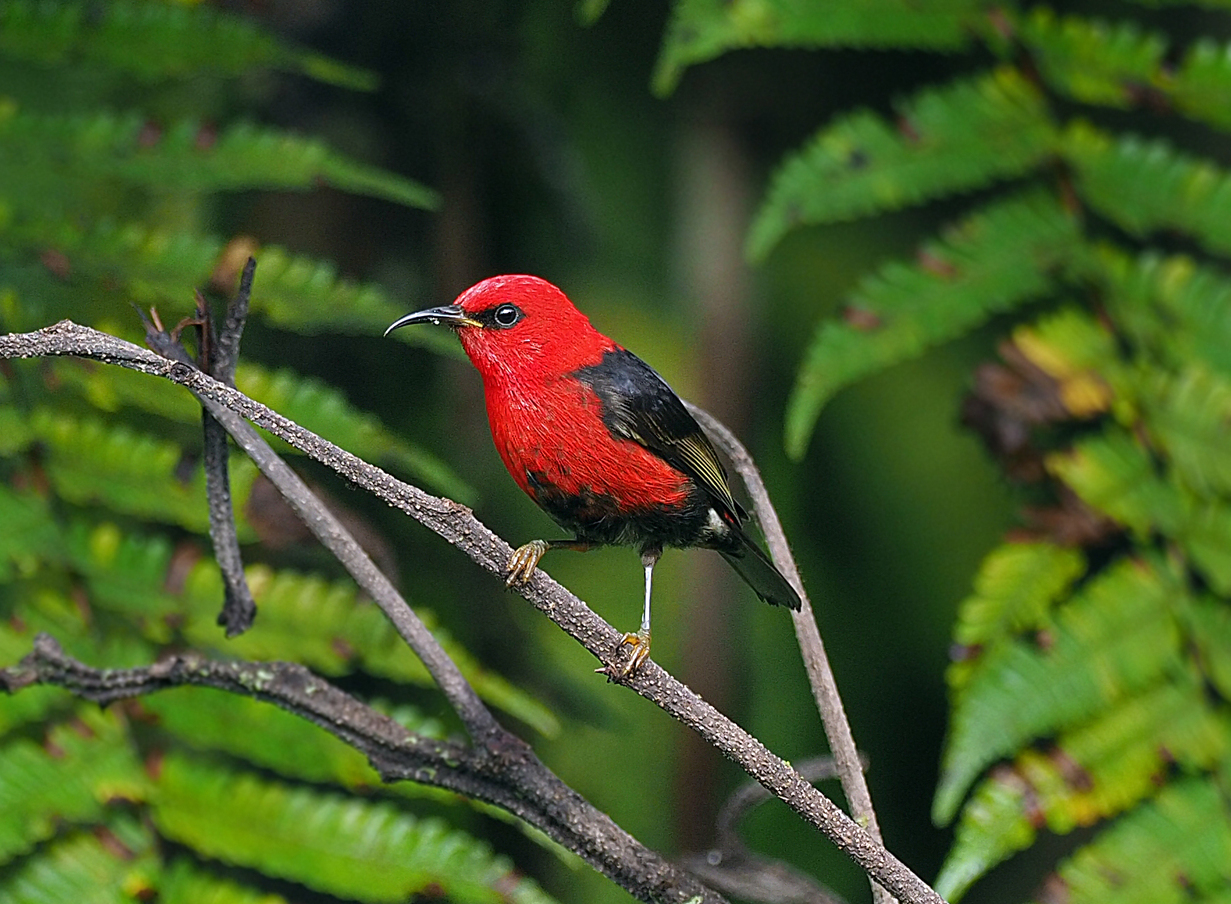
- Buru subspecies
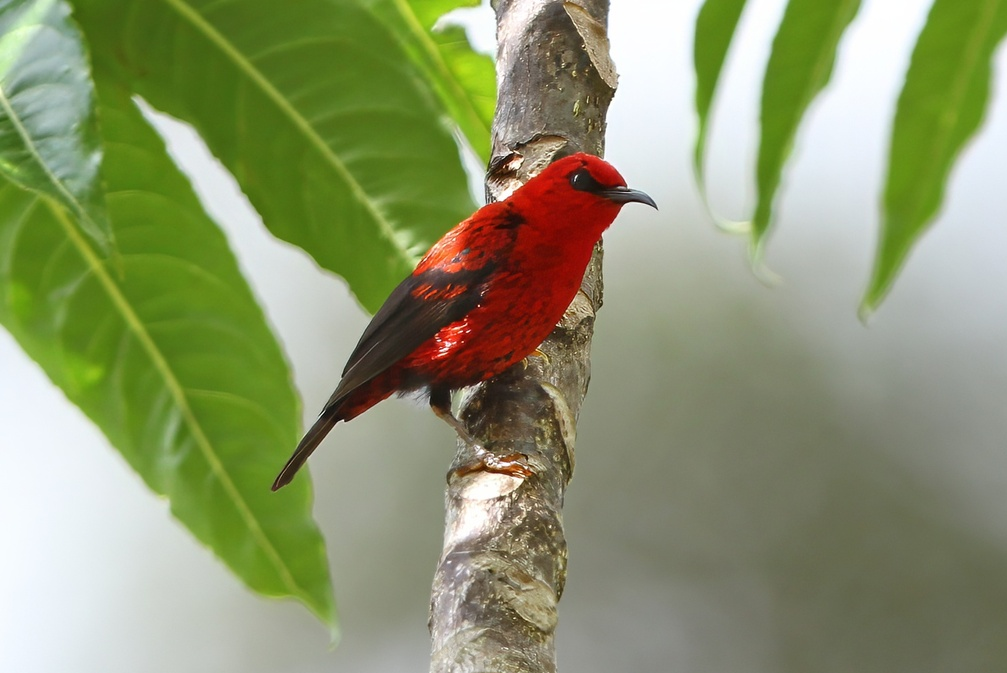
- Seram subspecies

Conservation status
- Least Concern (IUCN 3.1)

Scientific classification
- Kingdom: Animalia
- Phylum: Chordata
- Class: Aves
- Order: Passeriformes
- Family: Meliphagidae
- Genus: Myzomela
- Species: M. wakoloensis

Binomial name
- Myzomela wakoloensis Forbes, 1883

= Wakolo myzomela =

Species of bird

The Wakolo myzomela (Myzomela wakoloensis) is a species of bird in the family Meliphagidae. It is endemic to Indonesia, where it occurs in the Moluccan Islands of Buru and Seram. Its natural habitats are subtropical or tropical moist lowland forests, subtropical or tropical mangrove forests, and subtropical or tropical moist montane forests.

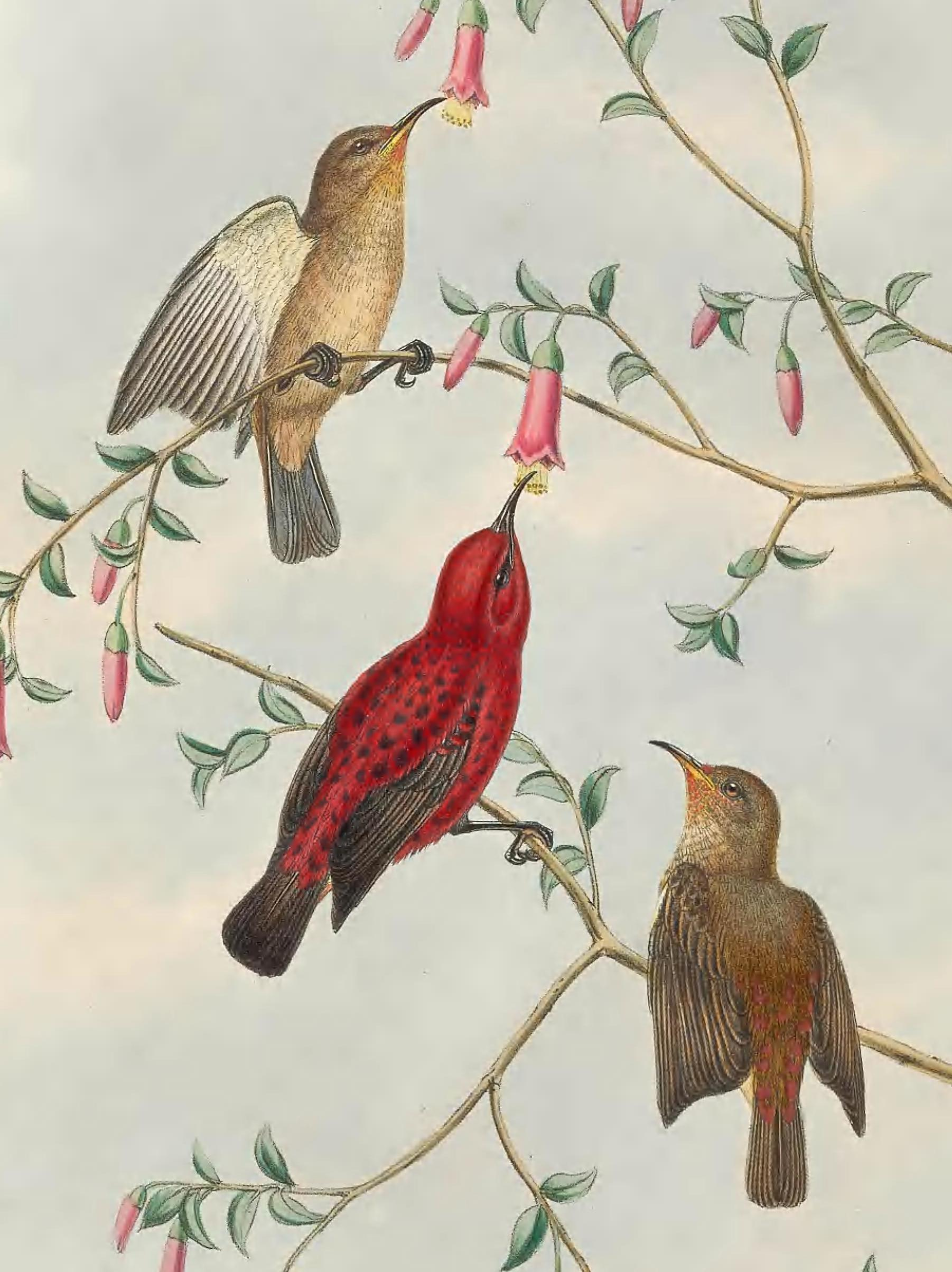
Adult female (up left) adult male (center) and juvenile (bottom right)
