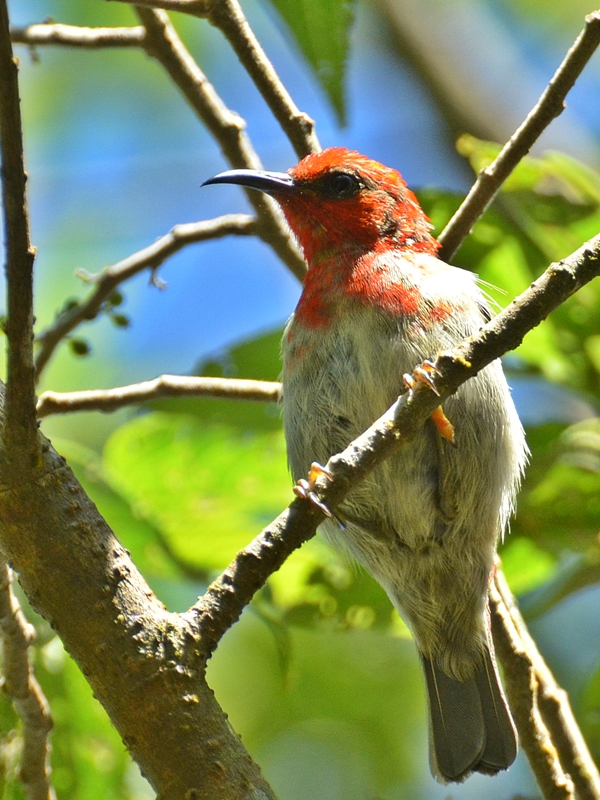
- male
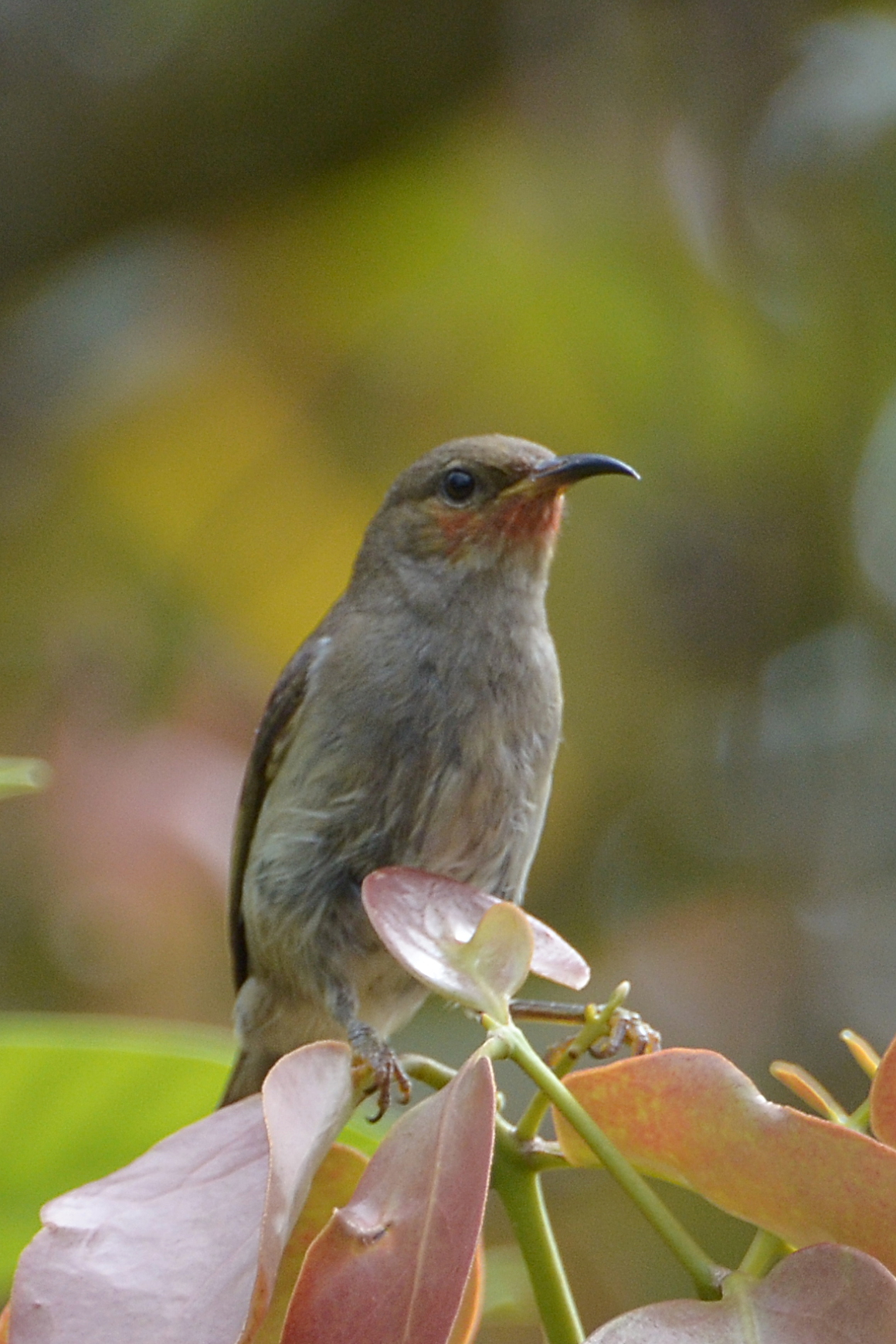
- female

Conservation status
- Least Concern (IUCN 3.1)

Scientific classification
- Kingdom: Animalia
- Phylum: Chordata
- Class: Aves
- Order: Passeriformes
- Family: Meliphagidae
- Genus: Myzomela
- Species: M. chloroptera

Binomial name
- Myzomela chloroptera Walden, 1872

= Sulawesi myzomela =

Species of bird

The Sulawesi myzomela (Myzomela chloroptera) is a species of bird in the family Meliphagidae. It is endemic to Indonesia where it occurs in Sulawesi, Taliabu, Selayar and Tanah Jampea. Its natural habitats are subtropical or tropical moist lowland forests, subtropical or tropical mangrove forests, and subtropical or tropical moist montane forests.
