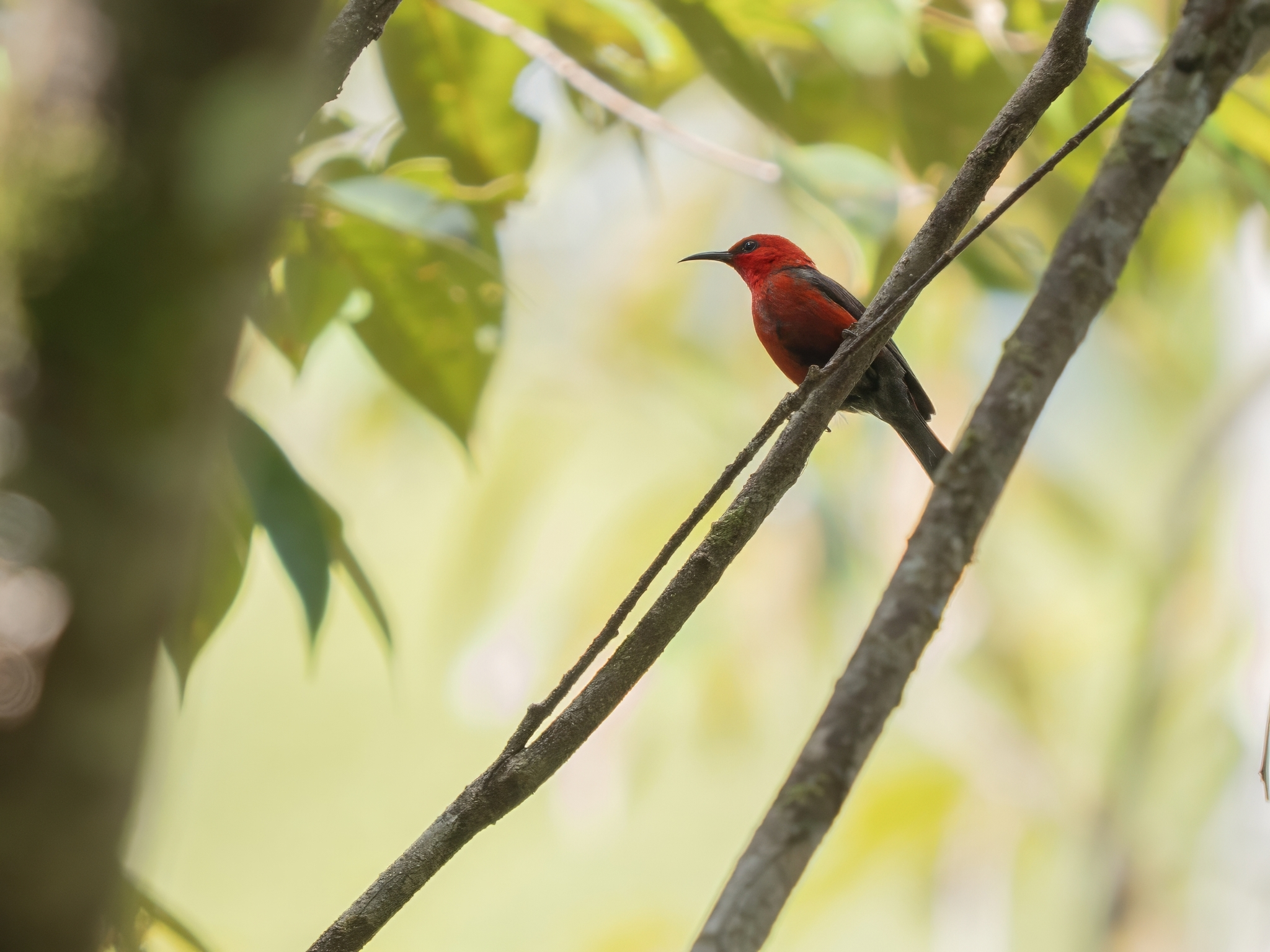

Scientific classification
- Kingdom: Animalia
- Phylum: Chordata
- Class: Aves
- Order: Passeriformes
- Family: Meliphagidae
- Genus: Myzomela
- Species: M. wahe

Binomial name
- Myzomela wahe Rheindt, Prawiradilaga, Ashari, Suparno & Wu, MY, 2020

= Taliabu myzomela =

Species of bird

The Taliabu myzomela (Myzomela wahe) is a species of bird in the honeyeater family. It was first described in 2020. The species was named after the village of Wahe on Taliabu Island, which is the gateway to the highest elevations on Taliabu, where it most commonly occurs.

This myzomela has thus far only been found on the island of Taliabu within the Sula Archipelago. On Taliabu, it has been recorded from sea level to 1,300m, and presumably occurs further, up all the way to the highest elevation at ~1,415m. The species inhabits forest canopy and edge habitat. It is a nectarivore and frugivore that has been photographed feeding at flowers.

== See also ==
- List of bird species described in the 2020s
