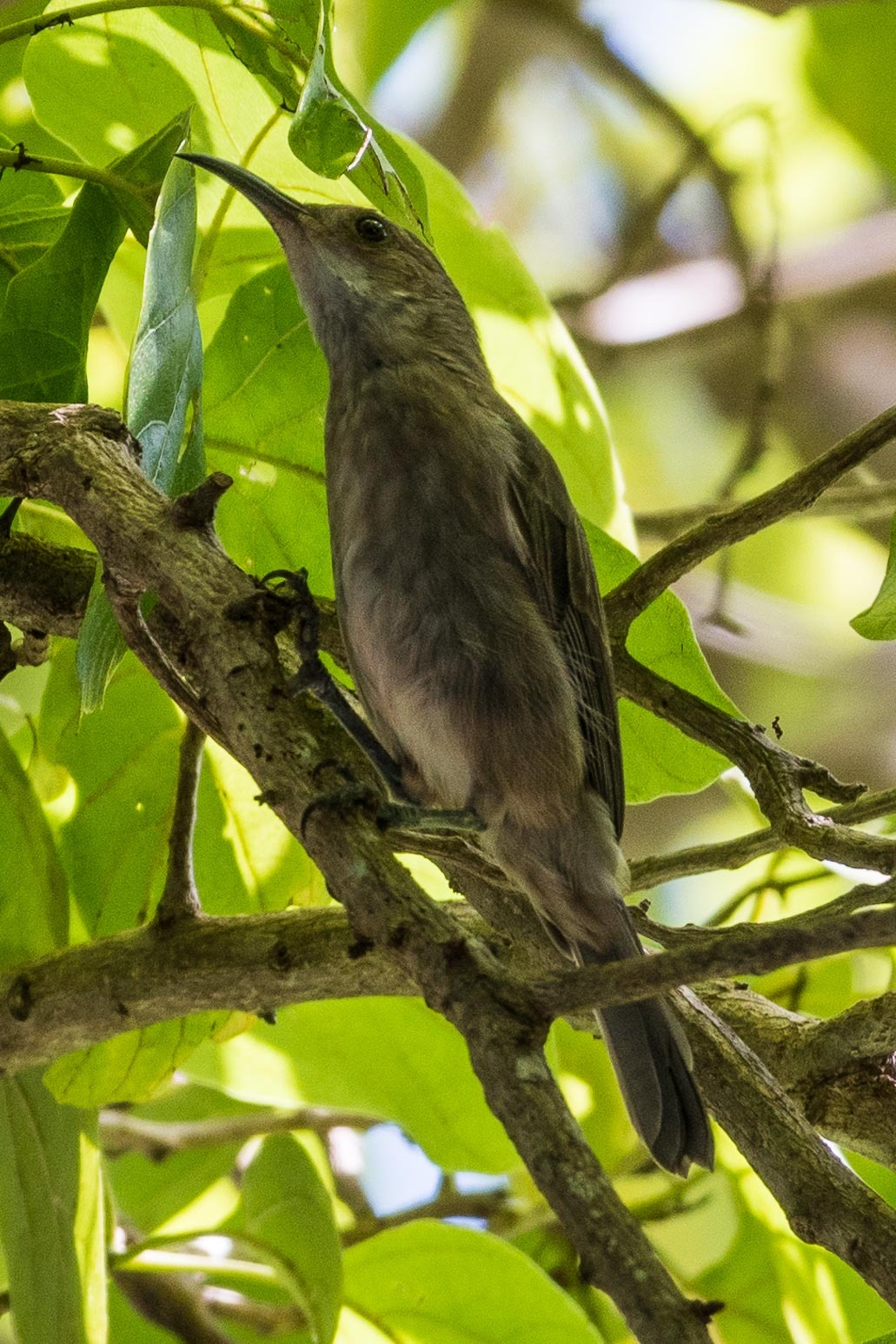

Conservation status
- Data Deficient (IUCN 3.1)

Scientific classification
- Kingdom: Animalia
- Phylum: Chordata
- Class: Aves
- Order: Passeriformes
- Family: Meliphagidae
- Genus: Myzomela
- Species: M. albigula

Binomial name
- Myzomela albigula Hartert, 1898

= White-chinned myzomela =

Species of bird

The white-chinned myzomela (Myzomela albigula) is a species of bird in the family Meliphagidae. It is found in the Louisiade Archipelago.
