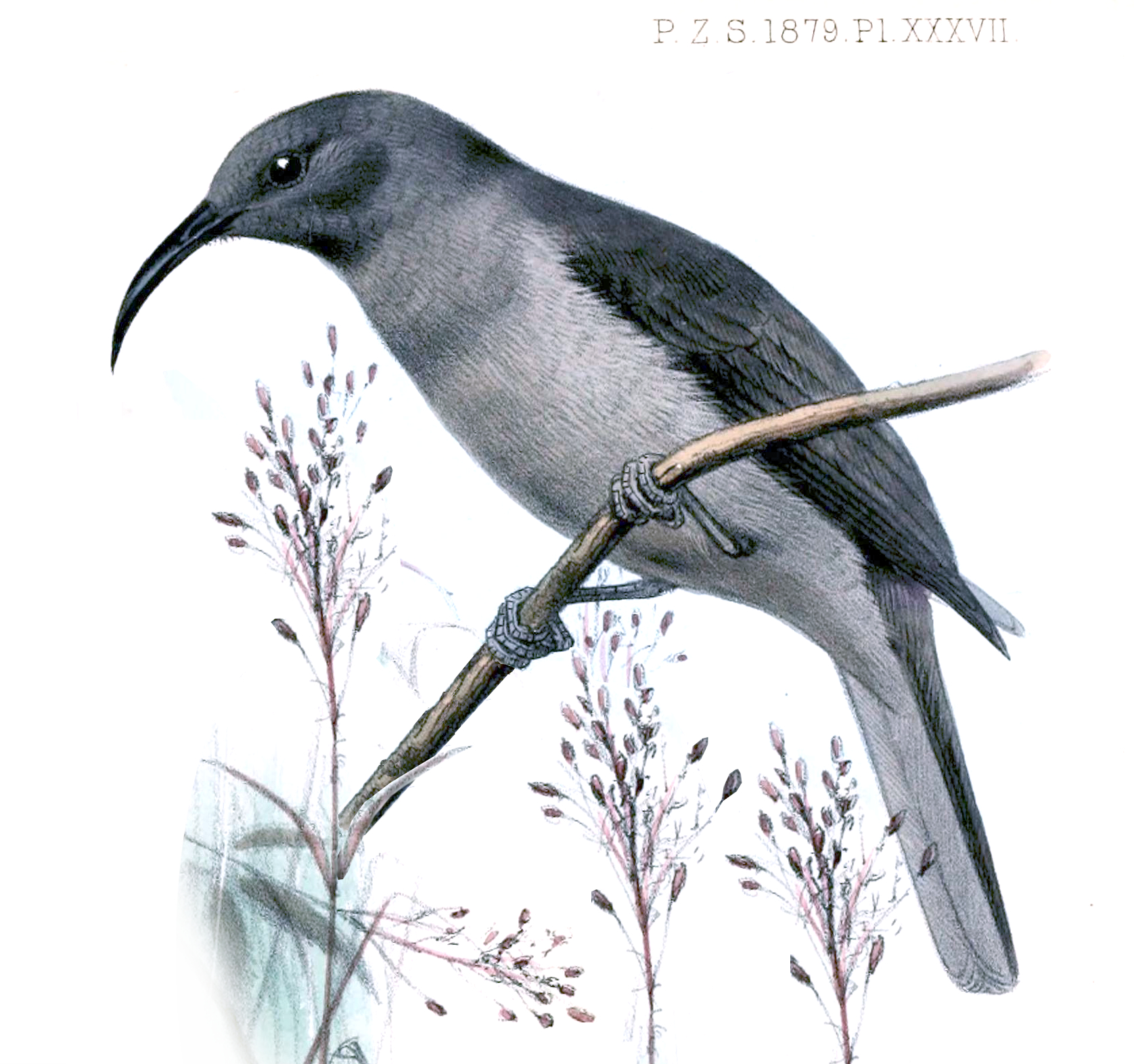

Conservation status
- Least Concern (IUCN 3.1)

Scientific classification
- Kingdom: Animalia
- Phylum: Chordata
- Class: Aves
- Order: Passeriformes
- Family: Meliphagidae
- Genus: Myzomela
- Species: M. cineracea

Binomial name
- Myzomela cineracea Sclater, PL, 1879

= Ashy myzomela =

Species of bird

The ashy myzomela (Myzomela cineracea) is a species of bird in the family Meliphagidae. It is found in New Britain and Umboi Island in Papua New Guinea. It was previously considered a subspecies of the ruby-throated myzomela.
