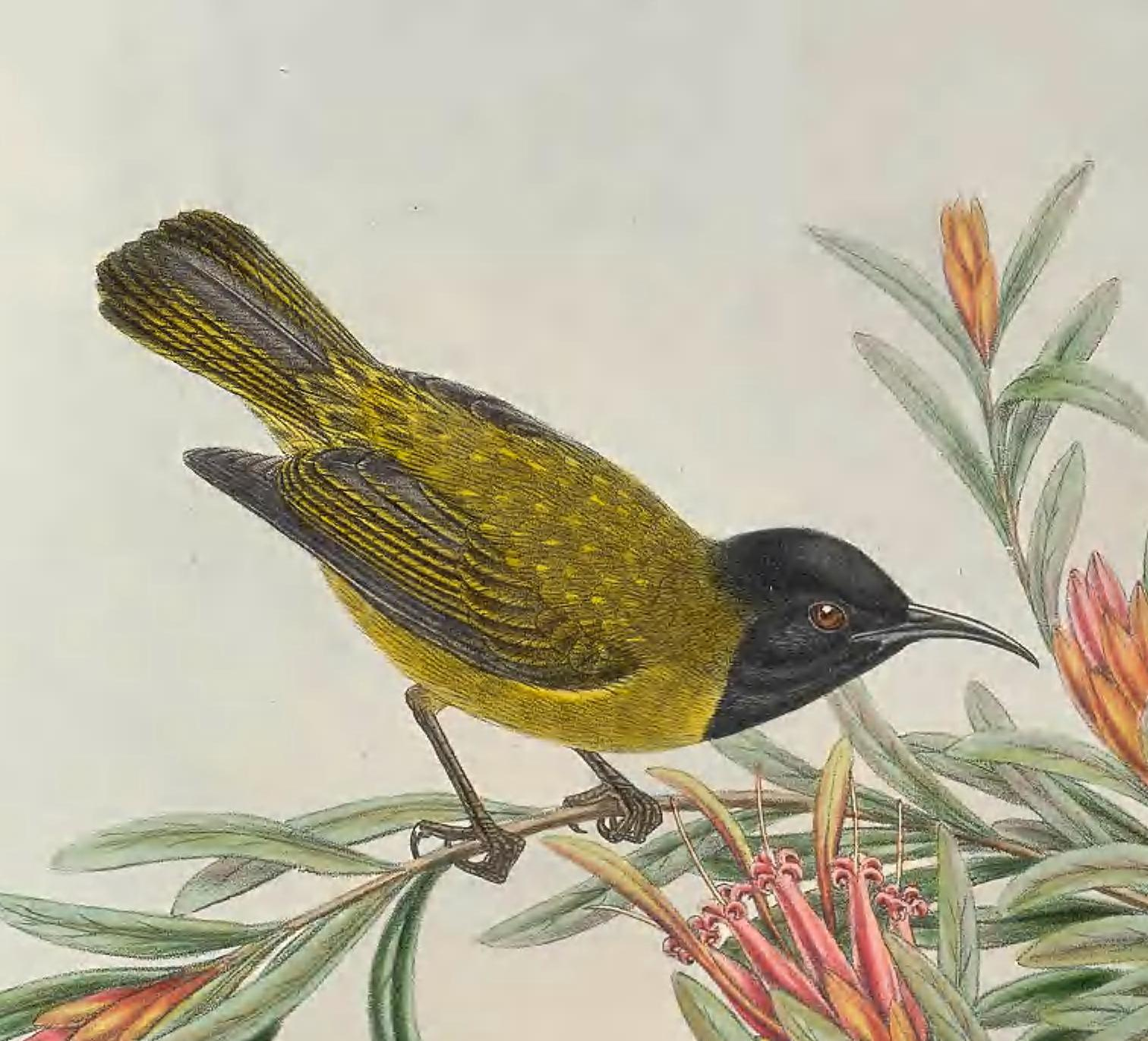

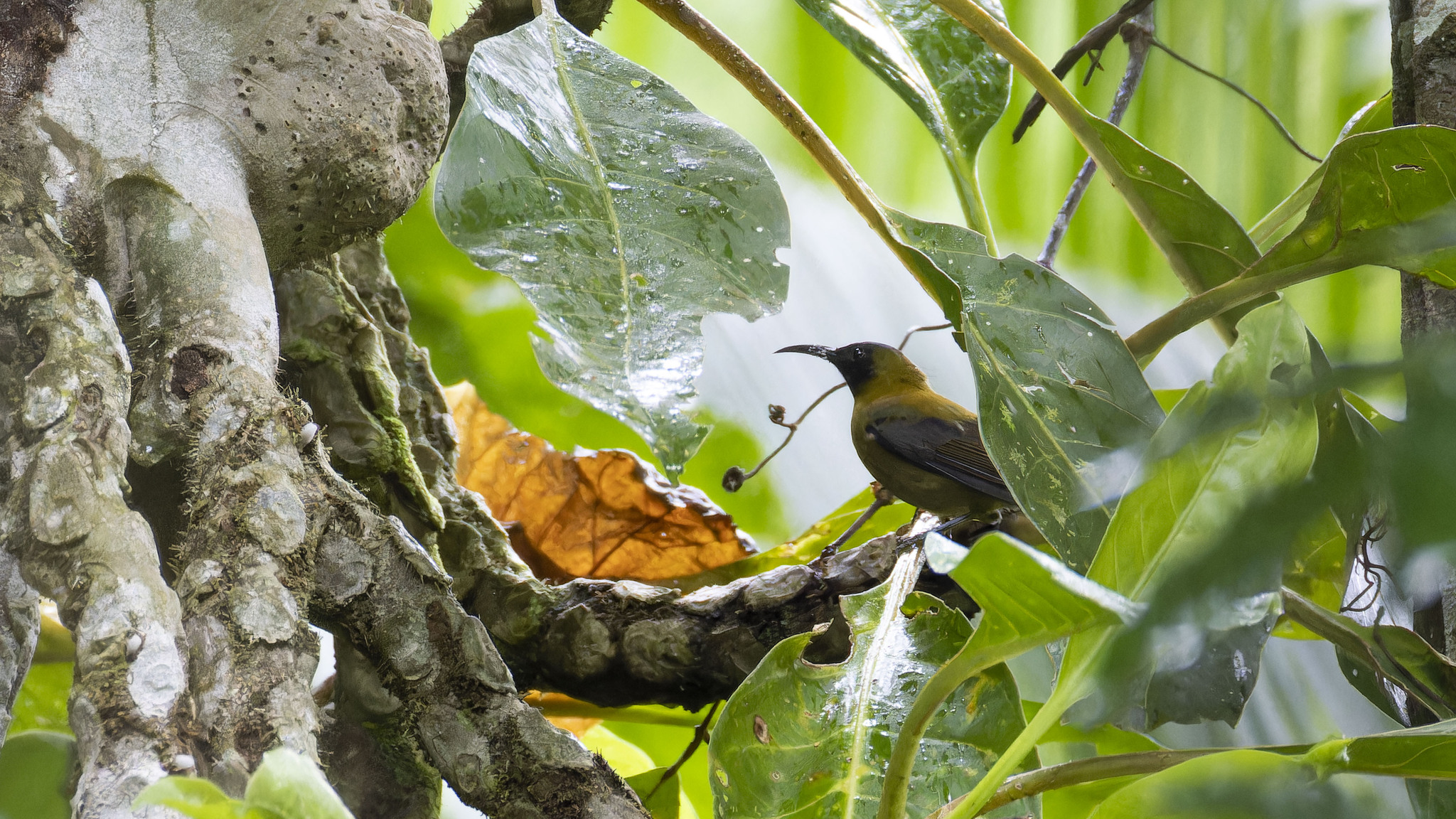

Conservation status
- Least Concern (IUCN 3.1)

Scientific classification
- Kingdom: Animalia
- Phylum: Chordata
- Class: Aves
- Order: Passeriformes
- Family: Meliphagidae
- Genus: Myzomela
- Species: M. melanocephala

Binomial name
- Myzomela melanocephala (Ramsay, 1879)

= Black-headed myzomela =

Species of bird

The black-headed myzomela (Myzomela melanocephala) is a bird of the family Meliphagidae, the honeyeaters, endemic to the central Solomon Islands. It lives in the subtropical to tropical moist forests.

It reaches reproductive age at 1.1 years and lives to 2.5 years on average, though some specimens have lived to 8.86 years old.

== Etymology ==
The genus name, Myzomela, comes from the Ancient Greek μυζαω (muzaō), meaning "to suck", and μελι (meli), meaning "honey". The specific epithet, melanocephala, comes from the Ancient Greek μελας (melas) or μελανος (melanos), meaning "black", and -κεφαλος (-kephalos), meaning "-headed", further derived from κεφαλη (kephalē), meaning "head".

== Habitat and ecology ==
The extent of occurrence of the black-headed myzomela is 10,200 km^{2} (2,500,000 acres). Their major habitat is subtropical to tropical moist forests of the central Solomon Islands to which it is endemic. While the population size is unknown, it is believed to be stable, and the bird is thought to be common.

They are non-migratory.

Their trophic level is that of an herbivore, with their trophic niche being that of a nectarivore (nectar-eater).

== Description ==
The dominant colors of the black-headed myzomela are brown, grey, white, black, green, and yellow. As its name suggests, its face and throat are entirely black with a relatively long, downward curving bill. Its body is yellowish, and its wings are a darker olive-green.

The black-headed myzomela is not to be confused with the Olive-backed sunbird; the former has a dark face and pale throat and has a much duller yellow underside.

From beak-tip to tail-tip, it measures 12–13 cm (4.7–5.1 in). It weighs 11–14 g (0.39–0.49 oz). Its wingspan is 12.08 cm (4.76 in). The length of its legs is 1.57 cm (0.62 in). The length of its beak is 1.29 cm (0.51 in), with width and height being 0.31 cm (0.12 in) and 0.3 cm (0.12 in), respectively.
