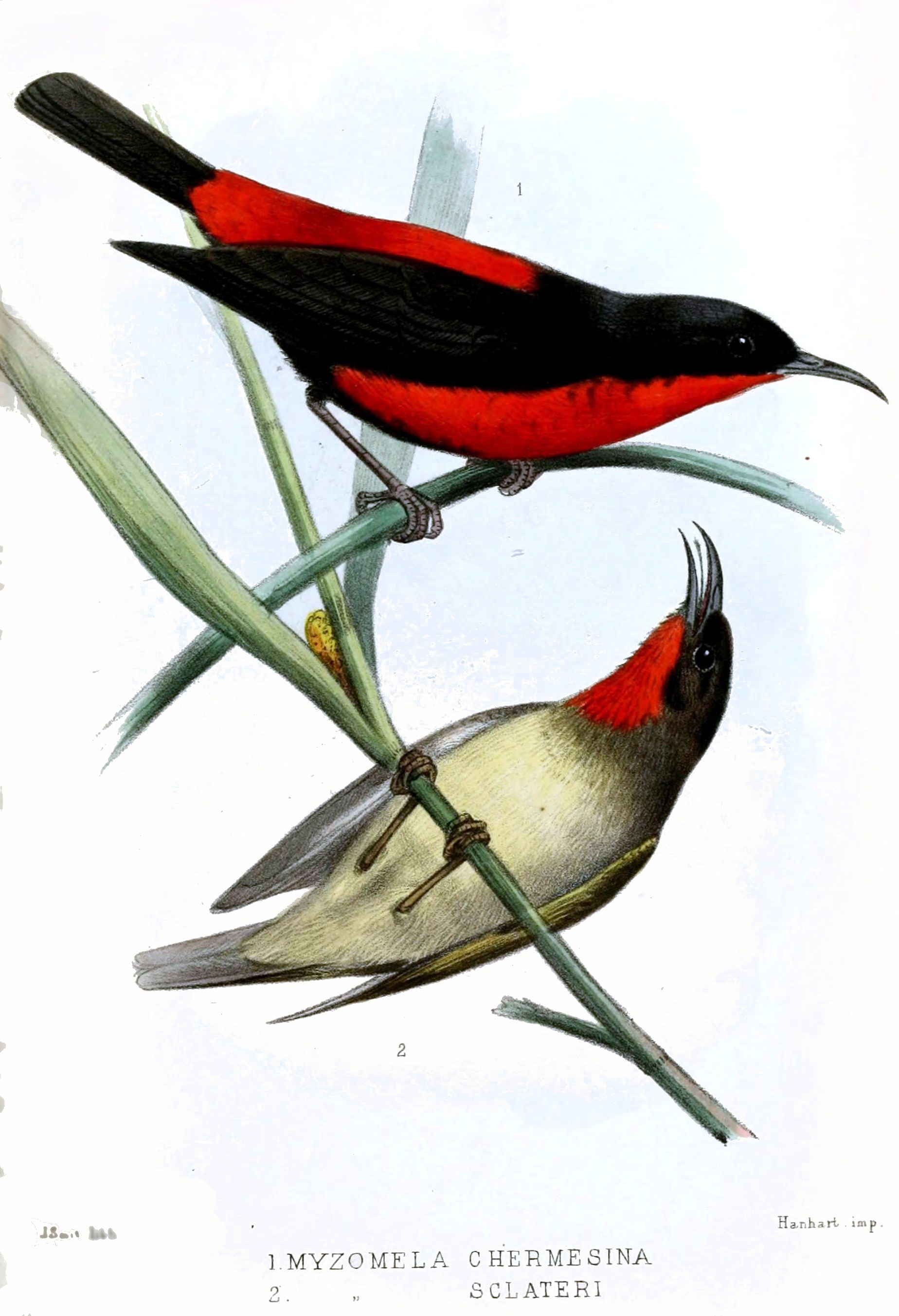
- Illustration (lower bird)
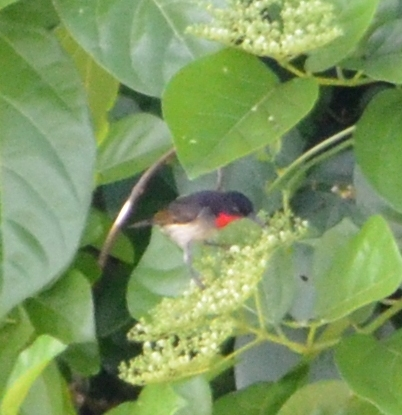
- Living specimen

Conservation status
- Least Concern (IUCN 3.1)

Scientific classification
- Kingdom: Animalia
- Phylum: Chordata
- Class: Aves
- Order: Passeriformes
- Family: Meliphagidae
- Genus: Myzomela
- Species: M. sclateri

Binomial name
- Myzomela sclateri Forbes, WA, 1879

= Sclater's myzomela =

Species of bird

Sclater's myzomela (Myzomela sclateri) or the scarlet-bibbed myzomela, is a species of bird in the family Meliphagidae. It is endemic to Papua New Guinea (Karkar and smaller islands). Its natural habitats are subtropical or tropical moist lowland forests and subtropical or tropical moist montane forests.
