= Red-capped myzomela =

Conservation status
- Least Concern (IUCN 3.1)

Scientific classification
- Kingdom: Animalia
- Phylum: Chordata
- Class: Aves
- Order: Passeriformes
- Family: Meliphagidae
- Genus: Myzomela
- Species: M. lafargei

Binomial name
- Myzomela lafargei Pucheran, 1853

Species of bird

The red-capped myzomela (Myzomela lafargei), also known as the scarlet-naped myzomela, is a species of bird in the family Meliphagidae. It is found in the Solomon Islands archipelago (Buka, Bougainville, the Shortland Islands, Fauro, Choiseul and Santa Isabel). Its natural habitats are subtropical or tropical moist lowland forests, subtropical or tropical mangrove forests, and subtropical or tropical moist montane forests.
