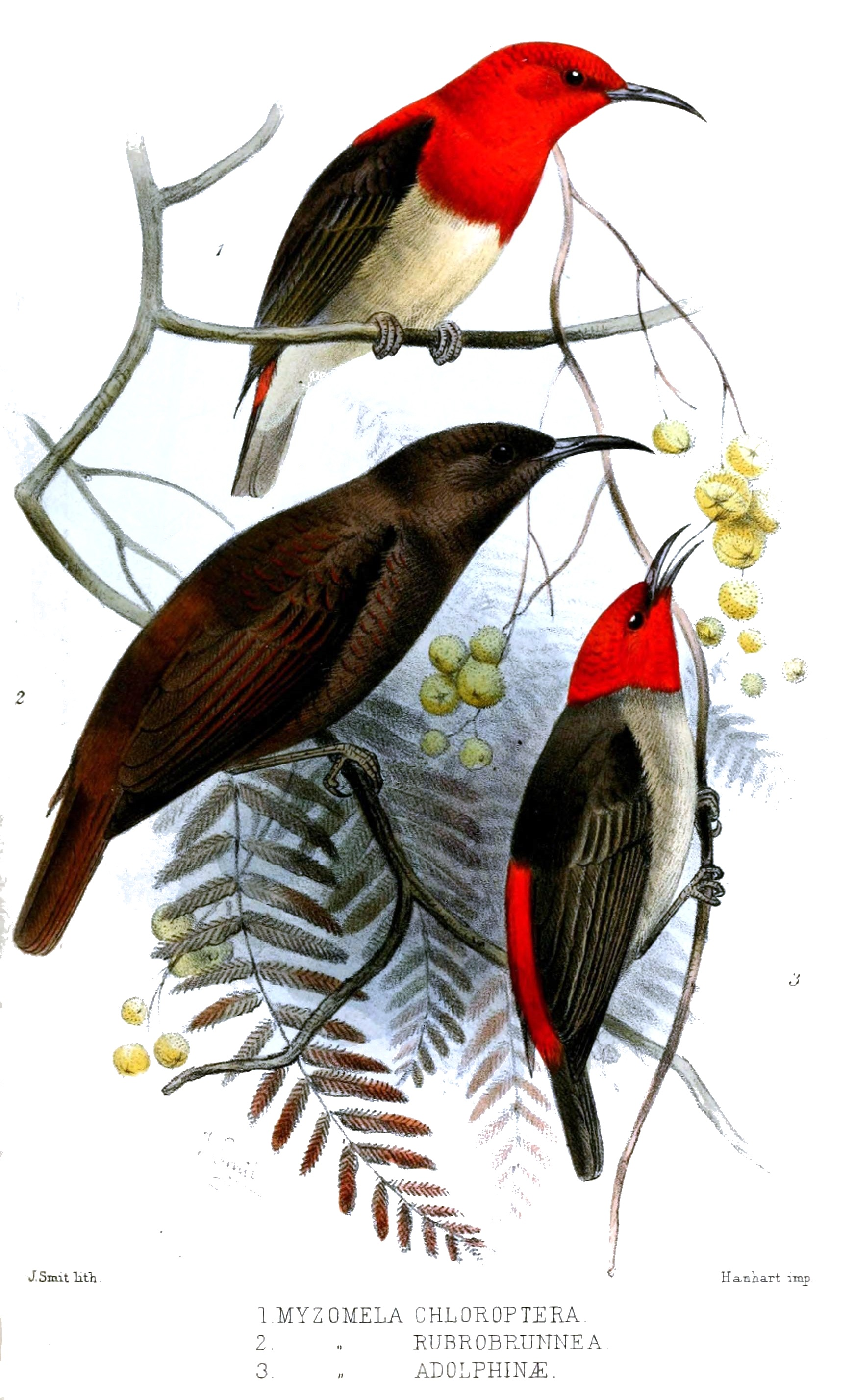
- Mountain myzomela (bottom right)

Conservation status
- Least Concern (IUCN 3.1)

Scientific classification
- Kingdom: Animalia
- Phylum: Chordata
- Class: Aves
- Order: Passeriformes
- Family: Meliphagidae
- Genus: Myzomela
- Species: M. adolphinae

Binomial name
- Myzomela adolphinae Salvadori, 1876

= Mountain myzomela =

Species of bird

The mountain myzomela (Myzomela adolphinae), also known as elfin myzomela or midget myzomela, is a species of bird in the family Meliphagidae. It is found in New Guinea. Its natural habitats are subtropical or tropical moist lowland forests and subtropical or tropical moist montane forests.

This species was named in honour of Adolphine Susanna Wilhelmina Bruijn.

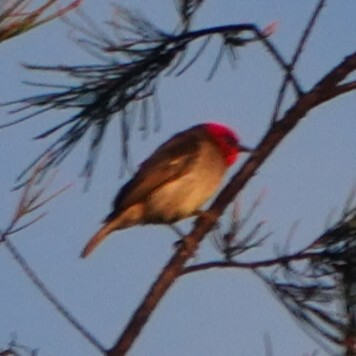
Live bird
