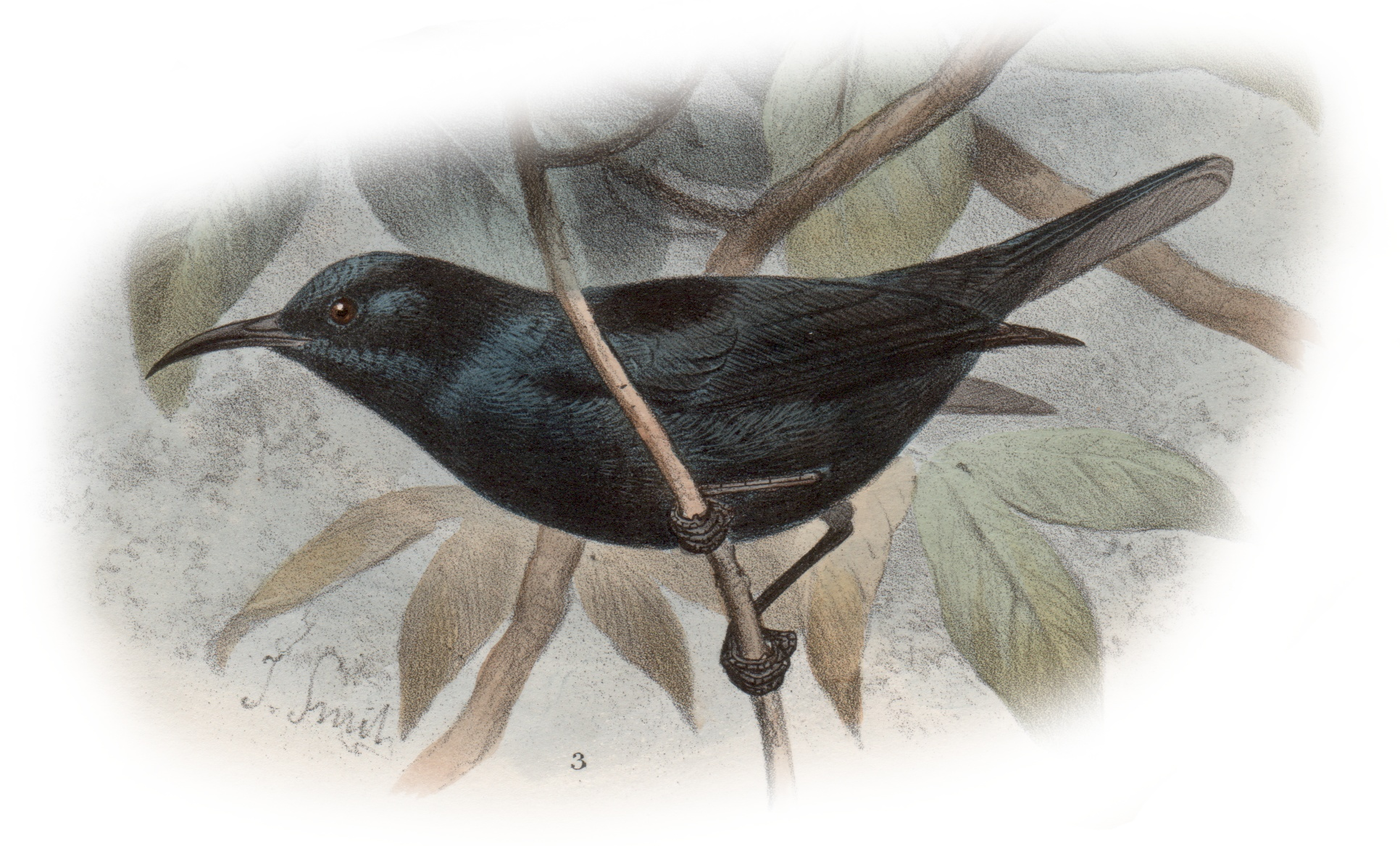

Conservation status
- Least Concern (IUCN 3.1)

Scientific classification
- Kingdom: Animalia
- Phylum: Chordata
- Class: Aves
- Order: Passeriformes
- Family: Meliphagidae
- Genus: Myzomela
- Species: M. pammelaena

Binomial name
- Myzomela pammelaena Sclater, PL, 1877

= Bismarck black myzomela =

Species of bird

The Bismarck black myzomela (Myzomela pammelaena) or ebony myzomela, is a species of bird in the Meliphagidae or honeyeater family. It is native to the Admiralty and St Matthias islands (Bismarck Islands, Papua New Guinea).

Its natural habitat is subtropical or tropical moist lowland forests.
