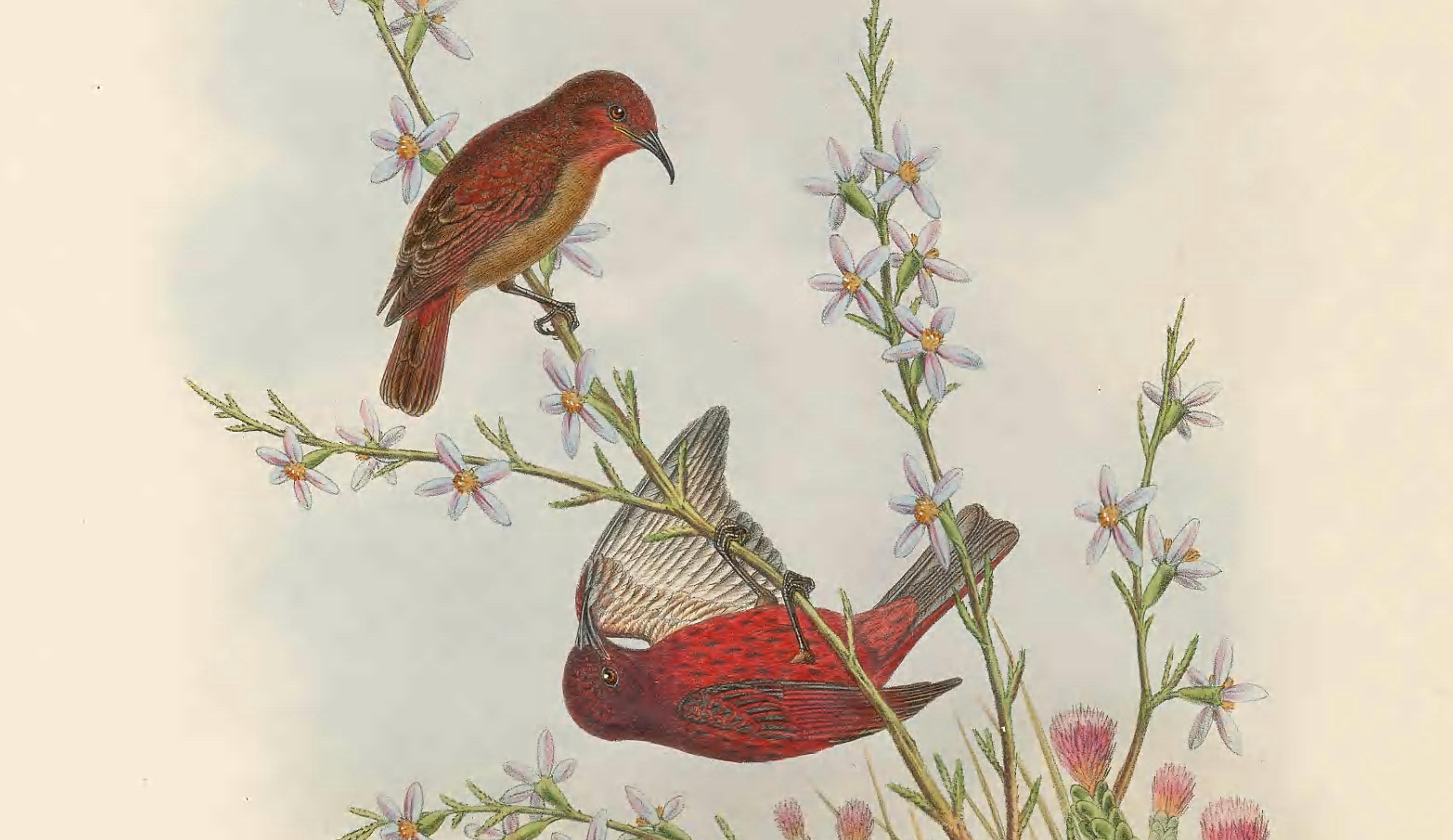
- Illustration by William Matthew Hart

Conservation status
- Least Concern (IUCN 3.1)

Scientific classification
- Kingdom: Animalia
- Phylum: Chordata
- Class: Aves
- Order: Passeriformes
- Family: Meliphagidae
- Genus: Myzomela
- Species: M. erythrina

Binomial name
- Myzomela erythrina E. P. Ramsay, 1877

= Reddish myzomela =

Species of bird

The reddish myzomela (Myzomela erythrina) is a species of bird in the family Meliphagidae. It is endemic to Papua New Guinea, where it is found on New Ireland and adjacent islands. Its natural habitats are subtropical or tropical moist lowland forests and subtropical or tropical moist montane forests.

It was formerly considered a subspecies of the red myzomela (Myzomela cruentata), but phylogenetic evidence indicates that both are distinct species, and it has thus been split by the IUCN Red List, BirdLife International, and the International Ornithologists' Union.

There are four recognized subspecies, each endemic to a certain island of the Bismarck Archipelago:

- M. e. erythrina - endemic to New Ireland
- M. e. lavongai - endemic to New Hanover
- M. e. cantans - endemic to Tabar Island
- M. e. vinacea - endemic to Dyaul Island
