= Bacan myzomela =

Conservation status
- Vulnerable (IUCN 3.1)

Scientific classification
- Kingdom: Animalia
- Phylum: Chordata
- Class: Aves
- Order: Passeriformes
- Family: Meliphagidae
- Genus: Myzomela
- Species: M. batjanensis

Binomial name
- Myzomela batjanensis Hartert, 1903

Species of bird

The Bacan myzomela (Myzomela batjanensis) is a species of bird in the family Meliphagidae. It is endemic to Indonesia where it occurs on the Bacan Islands. Its natural habitats are subtropical or tropical moist lowland forests, subtropical or tropical mangrove forests, and subtropical or tropical moist montane forests.
