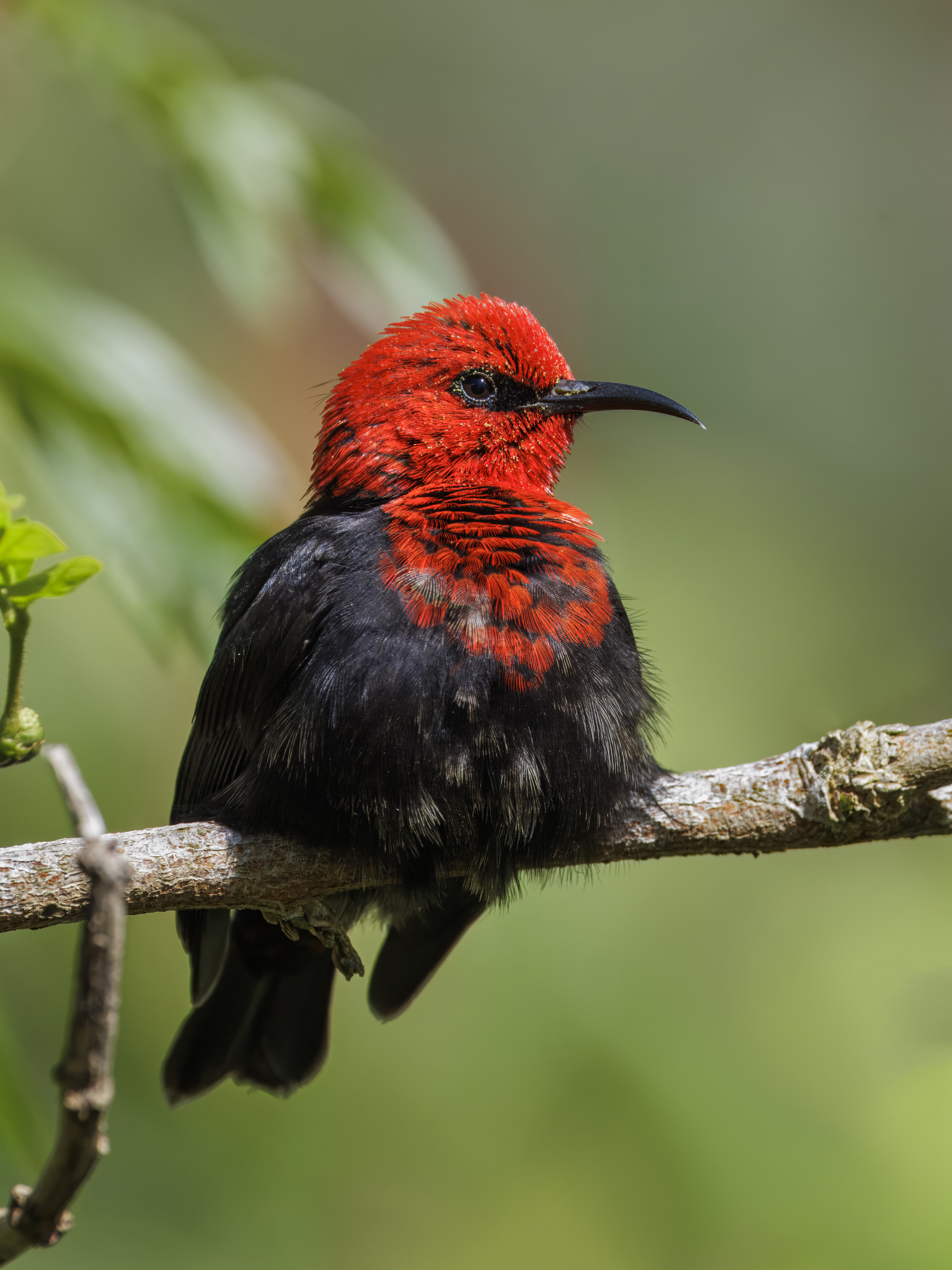
- Samoan myzomela Myzomela nigriventris

Scientific classification
- Kingdom: Animalia
- Phylum: Chordata
- Class: Aves
- Order: Passeriformes
- Family: Meliphagidae
- Genus: Myzomela; Vigors & Horsfield, 1827

Type species
- Meliphaga cardinalis = Certhia sanguinolenta Latham, 1801

= Myzomela =

Genus of birds

Myzomela is a genus of bird in the honeyeater family Meliphagidae. It is the largest genus of honeyeaters, with 40 species, and the most geographically widespread. It ranges from Indonesia to Australia and into the islands of the Pacific Ocean as far as Micronesia and Samoa. Several species are named after the islands they were discovered or live on, and continued investigation is (as of March 2025) still increasing the number of species, both through discovery of new species (Babar myzomela M. babarensis) and conclusion that former subspecies are actually distinct species (Tanimbar myzomela M. annabellae).

== Taxonomy ==
The genus was introduced by the naturalists Nicholas Vigors and Thomas Horsfield in 1827 with Meliphaga cardinalis as the type species. This is a junior synonym of Certhia sanguinolenta Latham, 1801, the scarlet myzomela.

The genus contained the following 43 species:

Image	Common name	Scientific name	Distribution
	Drab myzomela	Myzomela blasii	montane Seram, Boana (northwest of Seram) and Ambon (central east Moluccas)
	White-chinned myzomela	Myzomela albigula	Louisiade Archipelago (east of southeast New Guinea)
	Ashy myzomela	Myzomela cineracea	Umboi Island (west of New Britain) and New Britain (southeast Bismarck Archipelago)
	Ruby-throated myzomela	Myzomela eques	Raja Ampat Islands (northwest of New Guinea) and New Guinea
	Moluccan myzomela	Myzomela simplex	Morotai to Bacan Islands (north Moluccas)
	Red-tinged myzomela	Myzomela rubrotincta	Obi Islands and Bisa (central north Moluccas)
	Biak myzomela	Myzomela rubrobrunnea	Biak (Geelvink Bay islands, northwest New Guinea)
	Dusky myzomela	Myzomela obscura	south New Guinea and north, northeast Australia
	Red myzomela	Myzomela cruentata	New Guinea and New Britain (southeast Bismarck Archipelago)
	Reddish myzomela	Myzomela erythrina	New Ireland and adjacent islands (northeast Bismarck Archipelago)
	Papuan black myzomela	Myzomela nigrita	New Guinea
	New Ireland myzomela	Myzomela pulchella	montane New Ireland (northeast Bismarck Archipelago)
	Wetar myzomela	Myzomela kuehni	Wetar (east Lesser Sunda Islands)
	Alor myzomela	Myzomela prawiradilagae	montane Alor Island (central east Lesser Sunda Islands)
	Red-headed myzomela	Myzomela erythrocephala	coastal south New Guinea and north Australia
	Sumba myzomela	Myzomela dammermani	Sumba (central west Lesser Sunda Islands)
	Rote myzomela	Myzomela irianawidodoae	Rote Island (central east Lesser Sunda Islands)
	Mountain myzomela	Myzomela adolphinae	montane Bird's Head Peninsula (northwest New Guinea), central north, central east, northeast (Huon Peninsula) and southeast New Guinea
	Banda myzomela	Myzomela boiei	Banda Islands in Maluku
	Tanimbar myzomela	Myzomela annabellae	Yamdena and Selaru islands in Maluku
	Babar myzomela	Myzomela babarensis	Babar Islands in Maluku
	Taliabu myzomela	Myzomela wahe	Taliabu (Sula Islands, east of Sulawesi)
	Sulawesi myzomela	Myzomela chloroptera	Sulawesi and satellites
	Bacan myzomela	Myzomela batjanensis	montane Bacan Islands (north Moluccas)
	Wakolo myzomela	Myzomela wakoloensis	montane Buru and Seram (central Moluccas)
	Scarlet myzomela	Myzomela sanguinolenta	central east Queensland to south Victoria (east Australia)
	New Caledonian myzomela	Myzomela caledonica	Grande Terre and Ile des Pins (New Caledonia)
	Cardinal myzomela	Myzomela cardinalis	Makira, Rennell Island, and Temotu (=Santa Cruz Islands; southeast Solomon Islands), Vanuatu, and Loyalty Islands
	Samoan myzomela	Myzomela nigriventris	Savaii and Upolu (west Samoa) and Tutuila (west American Samoa, central Polynesia)
	Rotuma myzomela	Myzomela chermesina	Rotuma (far northwest Fiji, southwest Polynesia)
	Micronesian myzomela	Myzomela rubratra	Mariana and Caroline Islands (Micronesia)
	Sclater's myzomela	Myzomela sclateri	Karkar Island (north of central north New Guinea) and islets off New Britain (southeast Bismarck Archipelago)
	Bismarck black myzomela	Myzomela pammelaena	Bismarck Archipelago including Admiralty Islands and islets to west
	Red-capped myzomela	Myzomela lafargei	Buka Island to Isabel and satellites (north to central east Solomon Islands)
	Crimson-rumped myzomela	Myzomela eichhorni	New Georgia group (central west Solomon Islands)
	Red-vested myzomela	Myzomela malaitae	montane Malaita (southeast Solomon Islands)
	Black-headed myzomela	Myzomela melanocephala	Florida Islands, Savo Island (north of northwest Guadalcanal) and Guadalcanal (central south Solomon Islands)
	Sooty myzomela	Myzomela tristrami	Makira, Ugi Island (off northwest Makira) and Santa Catalina (or Owariki) and Owaraha (Santa Ana) (off southeast Makira; southeast Solomon Islands)
	Sulphur-breasted myzomela	Myzomela jugularis	Fiji (southwest Polynesia)
	Black-bellied myzomela	Myzomela erythromelas	New Britain (southeast Bismarck Archipelago)
	Black-breasted myzomela	Myzomela vulnerata	Timor (east Lesser Sunda Islands)
	Red-collared myzomela	Myzomela rosenbergii	montane New Guinea
	Long-billed myzomela	Myzomela longirostris	montane Goodenough Island (D'Entrecasteaux Archipelago, east of southeast New Guinea)
