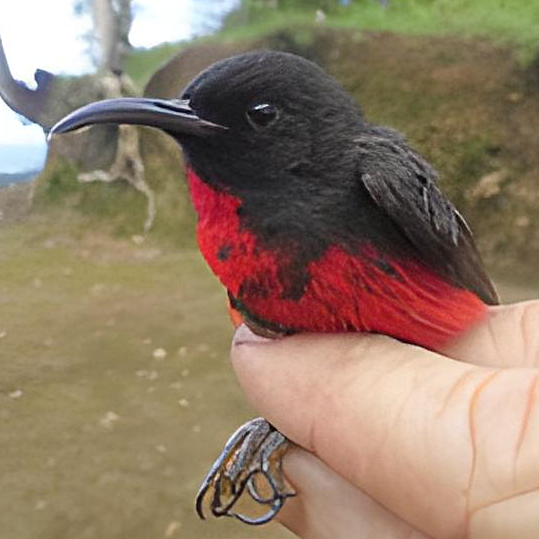

Conservation status
- Near Threatened (IUCN 3.1)

Scientific classification
- Kingdom: Animalia
- Phylum: Chordata
- Class: Aves
- Order: Passeriformes
- Family: Meliphagidae
- Genus: Myzomela
- Species: M. malaitae

Binomial name
- Myzomela malaitae Mayr, 1931

= Red-vested myzomela =

Species of bird

The red-vested myzomela (Myzomela malaitae), also known as the red-bellied myzomela, is a species of bird in the family Meliphagidae. It is endemic to Malaita (Solomon Islands). Its natural habitats are subtropical or tropical moist lowland forests and subtropical or tropical moist montane forests. It is threatened by habitat loss.
