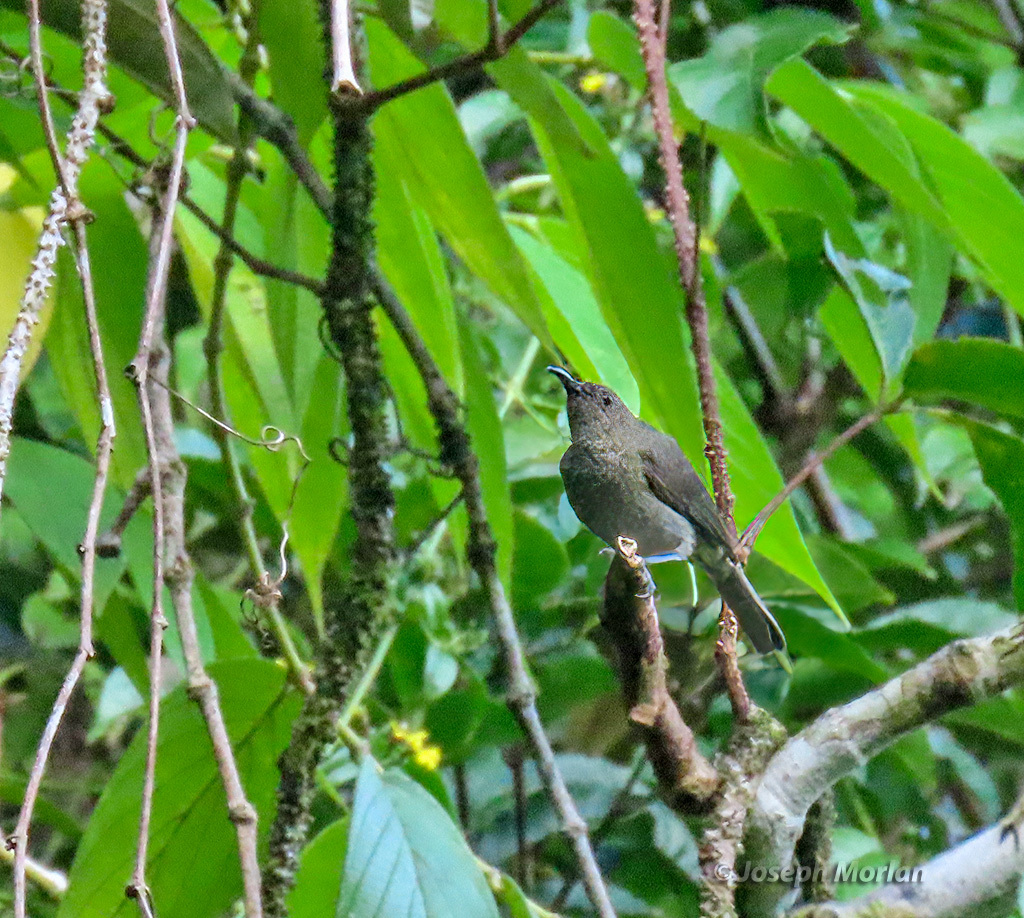

Conservation status
- Least Concern (IUCN 3.1)

Scientific classification
- Kingdom: Animalia
- Phylum: Chordata
- Class: Aves
- Order: Passeriformes
- Family: Meliphagidae
- Genus: Myzomela
- Species: M. blasii

Binomial name
- Myzomela blasii (Salvadori, 1882)

= Drab myzomela =

Species of bird

The drab myzomela or Seram myzomela (Myzomela blasii) is a species of bird in the family Meliphagidae. It is endemic to the islands of Seram, Boano and Ambon in Indonesia. Its natural habitats are subtropical or tropical moist lowland forests and subtropical or tropical moist montane forests.
