= New Ireland myzomela =

Conservation status
- Least Concern (IUCN 3.1)

Scientific classification
- Kingdom: Animalia
- Phylum: Chordata
- Class: Aves
- Order: Passeriformes
- Family: Meliphagidae
- Genus: Myzomela
- Species: M. pulchella

Binomial name
- Myzomela pulchella Salvadori, 1891

Species of bird in the family Meliphagidae

The New Ireland myzomela (Myzomela pulchella), also known as crimson-fronted myzomela or olive-yellow myzomela, is a species of bird in the family Meliphagidae. It is endemic to Papua New Guinea.

Its natural habitats are subtropical or tropical moist lowland forests and subtropical or tropical moist montane forests.
