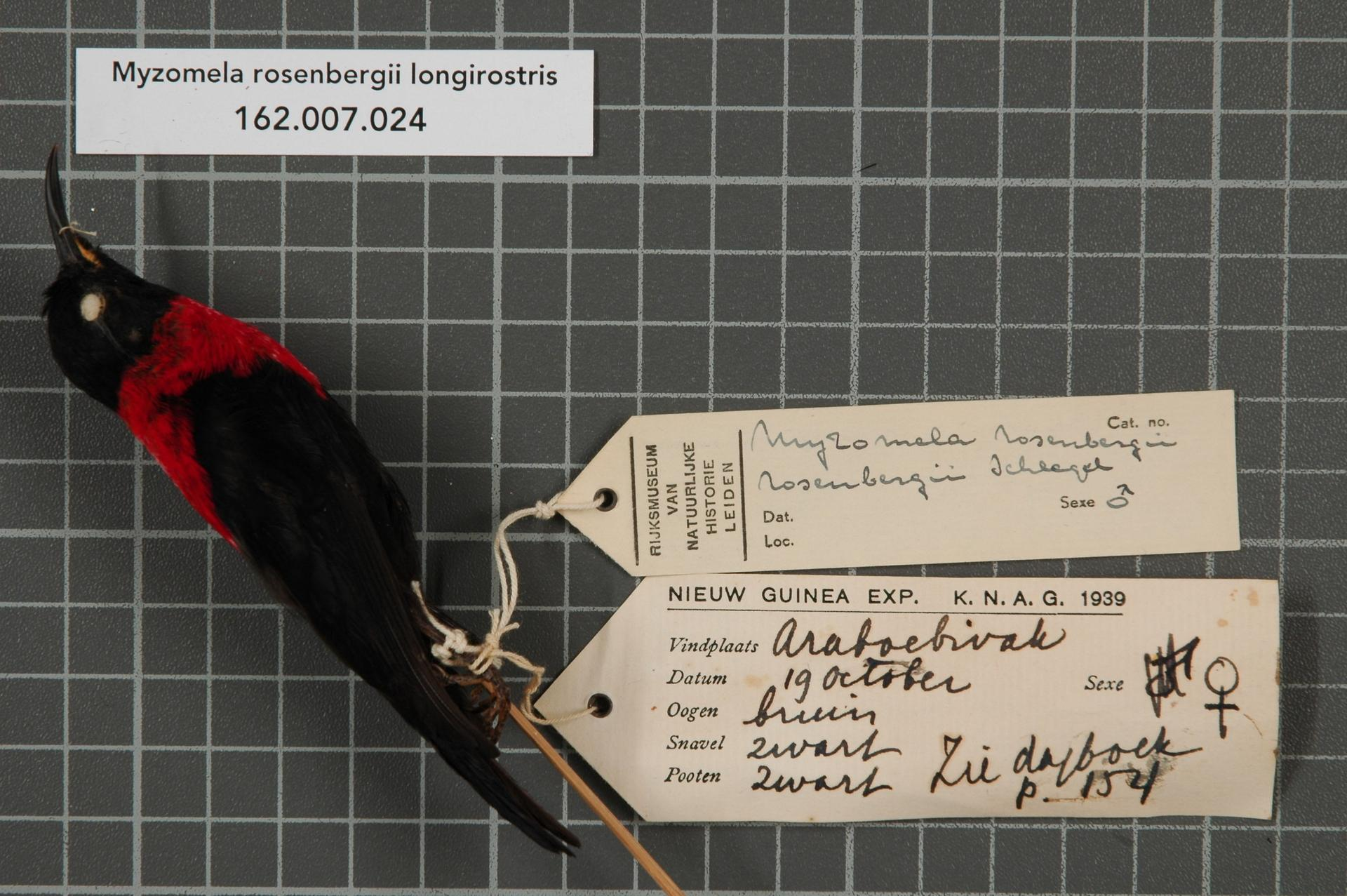
- Preserved specimen at Naturalis Biodiversity Center

Conservation status
- Least Concern (IUCN 3.1)

Scientific classification
- Kingdom: Animalia
- Phylum: Chordata
- Class: Aves
- Order: Passeriformes
- Family: Meliphagidae
- Genus: Myzomela
- Species: M. longirostris

Binomial name
- Myzomela longirostris Mayr & Rand, 1935

= Long-billed myzomela =

Species of bird

The long-billed myzomela (Myzomela longirostris) is a species of bird in the family Meliphagidae. It is found on Goodenough Island (d'Entrecasteaux Islands, Papua New Guinea). It was formerly considered a subspecies of the red-collared myzomela (Myzomela rosenbergii), but was split as a distinct species by the IOC in 2021.

Its natural habitat is subtropical or tropical moist montane forests.
