= Crimson-rumped myzomela =

Conservation status
- Least Concern (IUCN 3.1)

Scientific classification
- Kingdom: Animalia
- Phylum: Chordata
- Class: Aves
- Order: Passeriformes
- Family: Meliphagidae
- Genus: Myzomela
- Species: M. eichhorni

Binomial name
- Myzomela eichhorni Rothschild & Hartert, 1901

Species of bird

The crimson-rumped myzomela (Myzomela eichhorni) or yellow-vented myzomela, is a species of bird in the family Meliphagidae. It is endemic to the Western Province (Solomon Islands).
