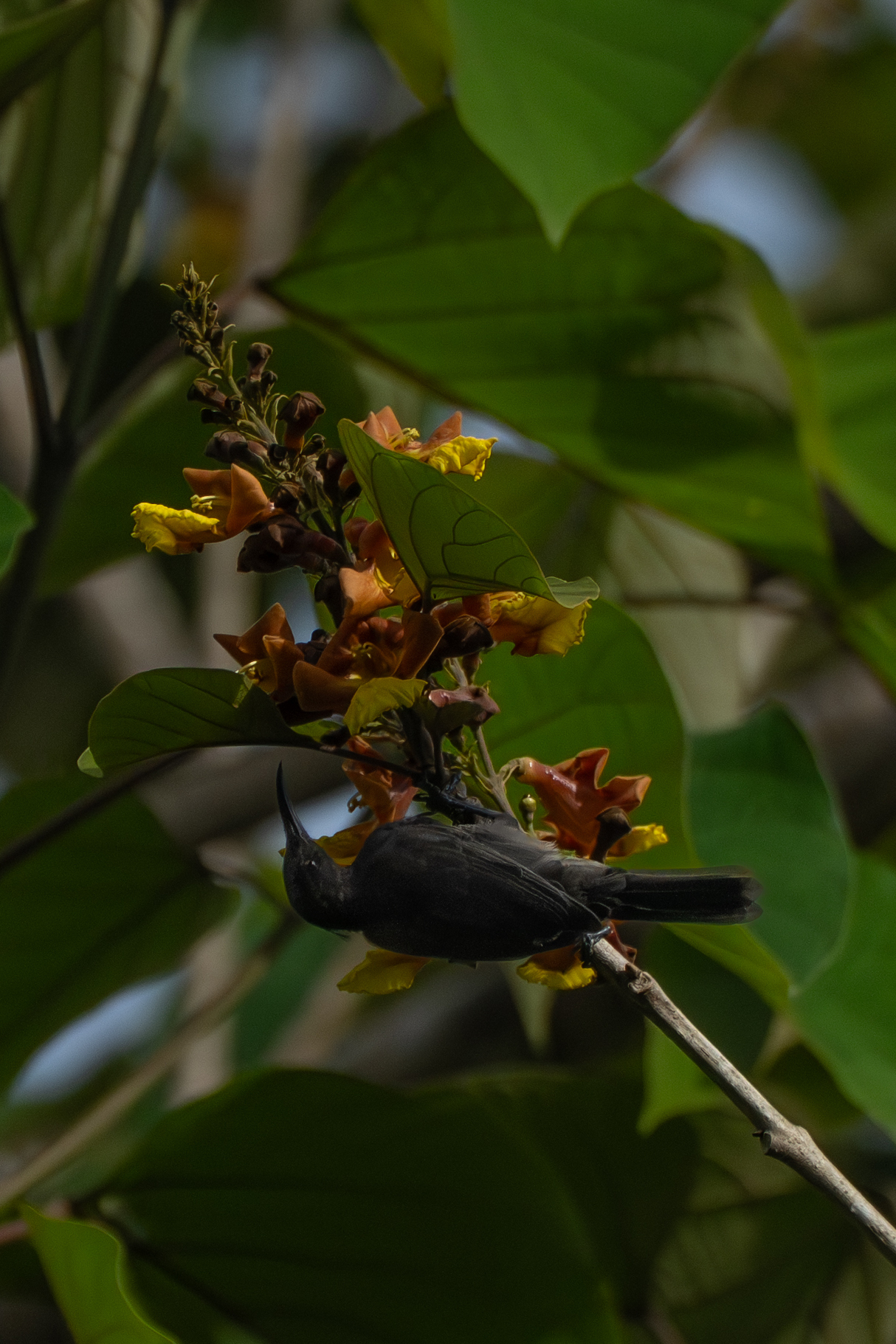

Conservation status
- Least Concern (IUCN 3.1)

Scientific classification
- Kingdom: Animalia
- Phylum: Chordata
- Class: Aves
- Order: Passeriformes
- Family: Meliphagidae
- Genus: Myzomela
- Species: M. eques

Binomial name
- Myzomela eques (Lesson & Garnot, 1827)

= Ruby-throated myzomela =

Species of bird

The ruby-throated myzomela or red-throated myzomela (Myzomela eques) is a species of bird in the family Meliphagidae. It is found in New Guinea. Its natural habitat is subtropical or tropical moist lowland forests.
