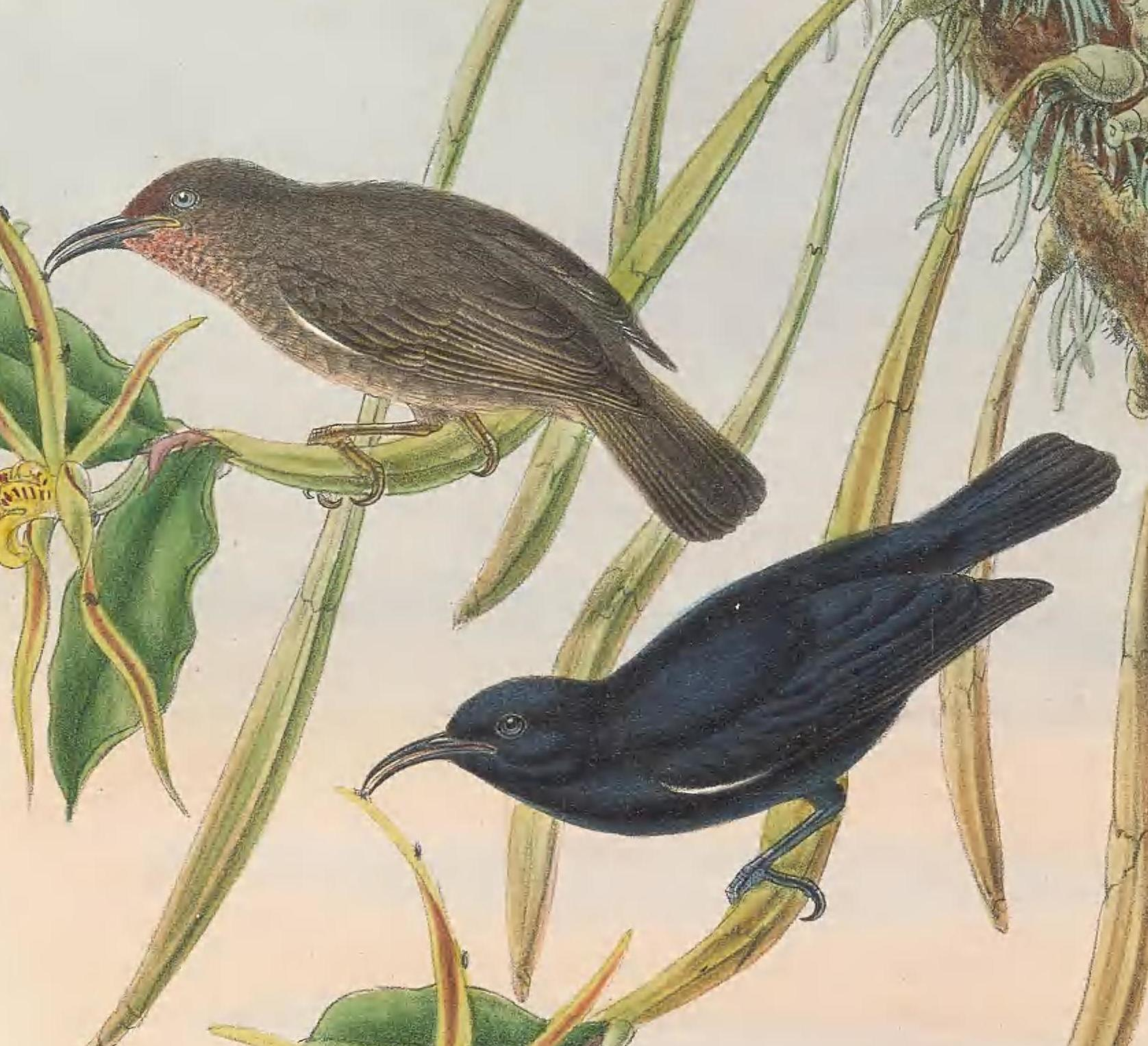
- Female and male
- Male

Conservation status
- Least Concern (IUCN 3.1)

Scientific classification
- Kingdom: Animalia
- Phylum: Chordata
- Class: Aves
- Order: Passeriformes
- Family: Meliphagidae
- Genus: Myzomela
- Species: M. nigrita

Binomial name
- Myzomela nigrita Gray, 1858

= Papuan black myzomela =

Species of bird

The Papuan black myzomela (Myzomela nigrita) is a species of bird in the family Meliphagidae. It is found in New Guinea and nearby islands. Its natural habitat is subtropical or tropical moist lowland forests and savannah woodland. It can be often found at flowering trees such as albizias and eucalypts.

== Description ==
The species is 12–13 cm (4.7–5.1 in) with males being larger than females. Males are lacquer-black and have white underwing-coverts. Females are coloured drab brown and they have a reddish forehead and throat, except for the tail. Some females have a sooty black face without any red and in the southeast of its range, many females may appear completely black. Juveniles resemble darker or grey-brown females.
