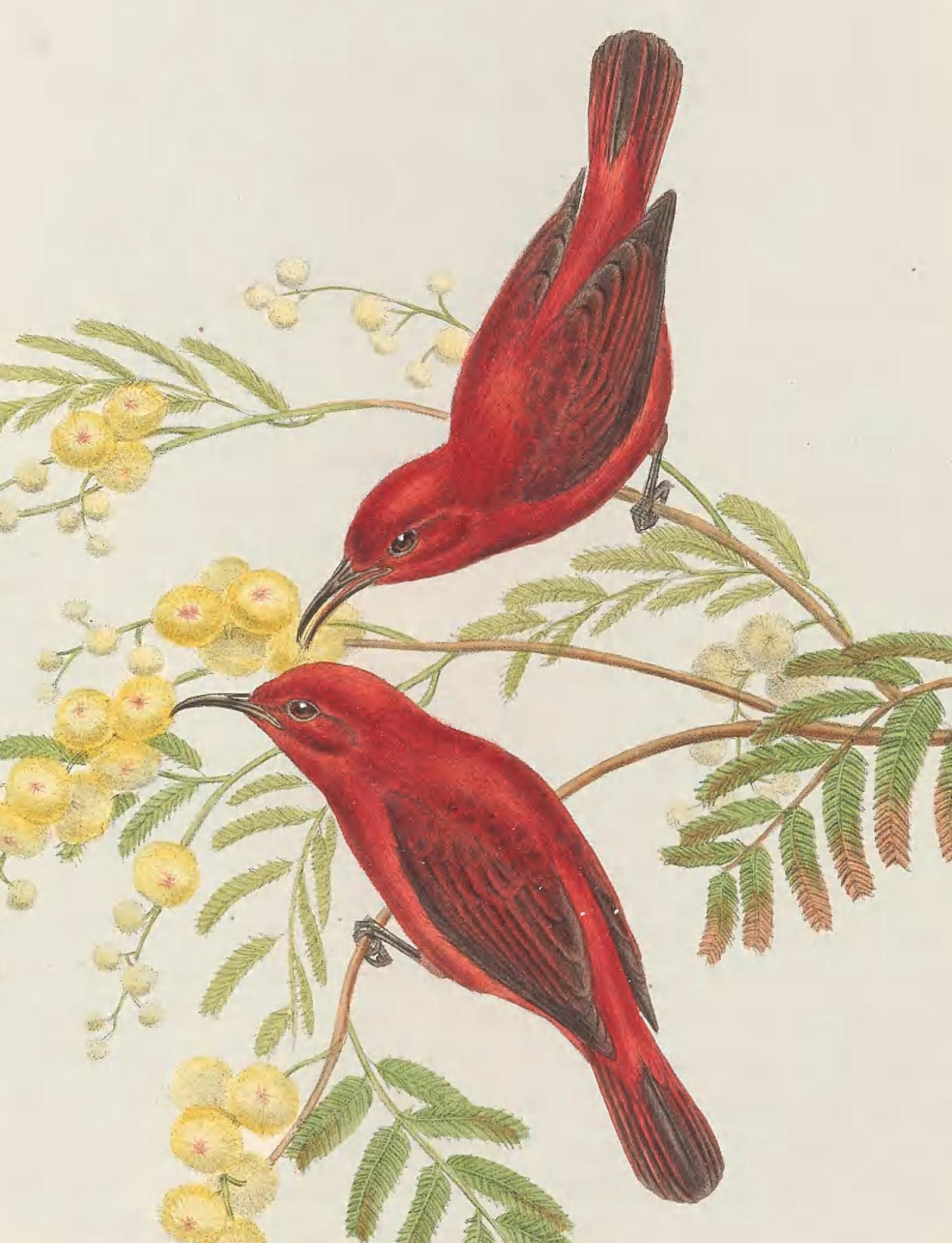

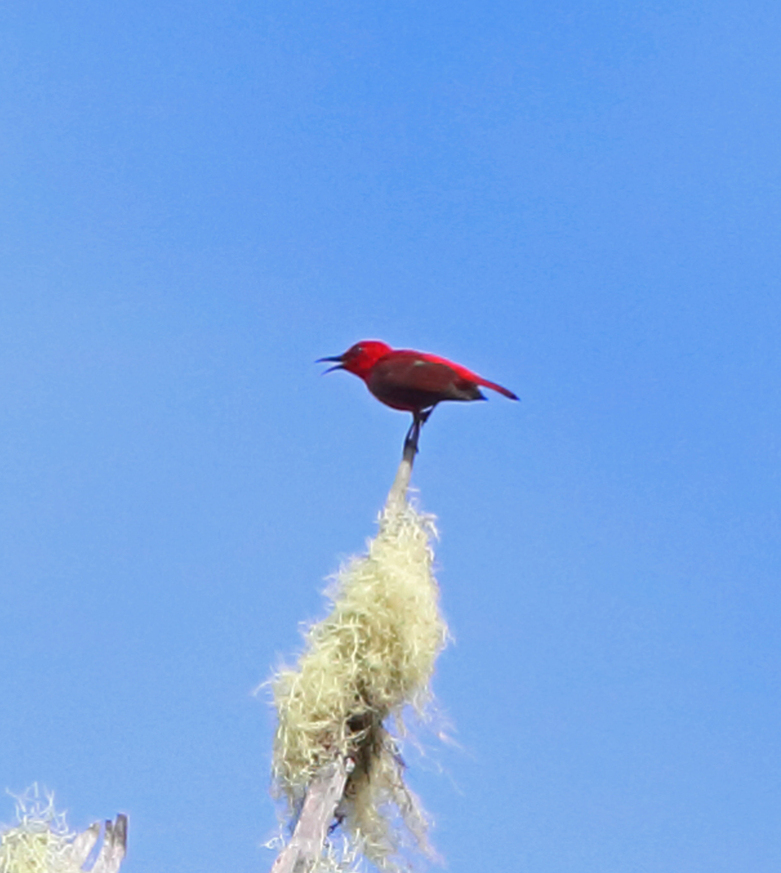

Conservation status
- Least Concern (IUCN 3.1)

Scientific classification
- Kingdom: Animalia
- Phylum: Chordata
- Class: Aves
- Order: Passeriformes
- Family: Meliphagidae
- Genus: Myzomela
- Species: M. cruentata

Binomial name
- Myzomela cruentata Meyer, 1874

= Red myzomela =

Species of bird

The red myzomela (Myzomela cruentata) is a species of bird in the family Meliphagidae. It is found in New Guinea and New Britain. Its natural habitats are subtropical or tropical moist lowland forests and subtropical or tropical moist montane forests.

The reddish myzomela (M. erythrina) of New Ireland was formerly considered conspecific, but phylogenetic evidence indicates that both are distinct species, and it has thus been split from it by the IUCN Red List, BirdLife International, and the International Ornithologists' Union.

There are two recognized subspecies:

- M. c. cruentata - New Guinea and Yapen
- M. c. coccinea - New Britain and the Duke of York Islands
