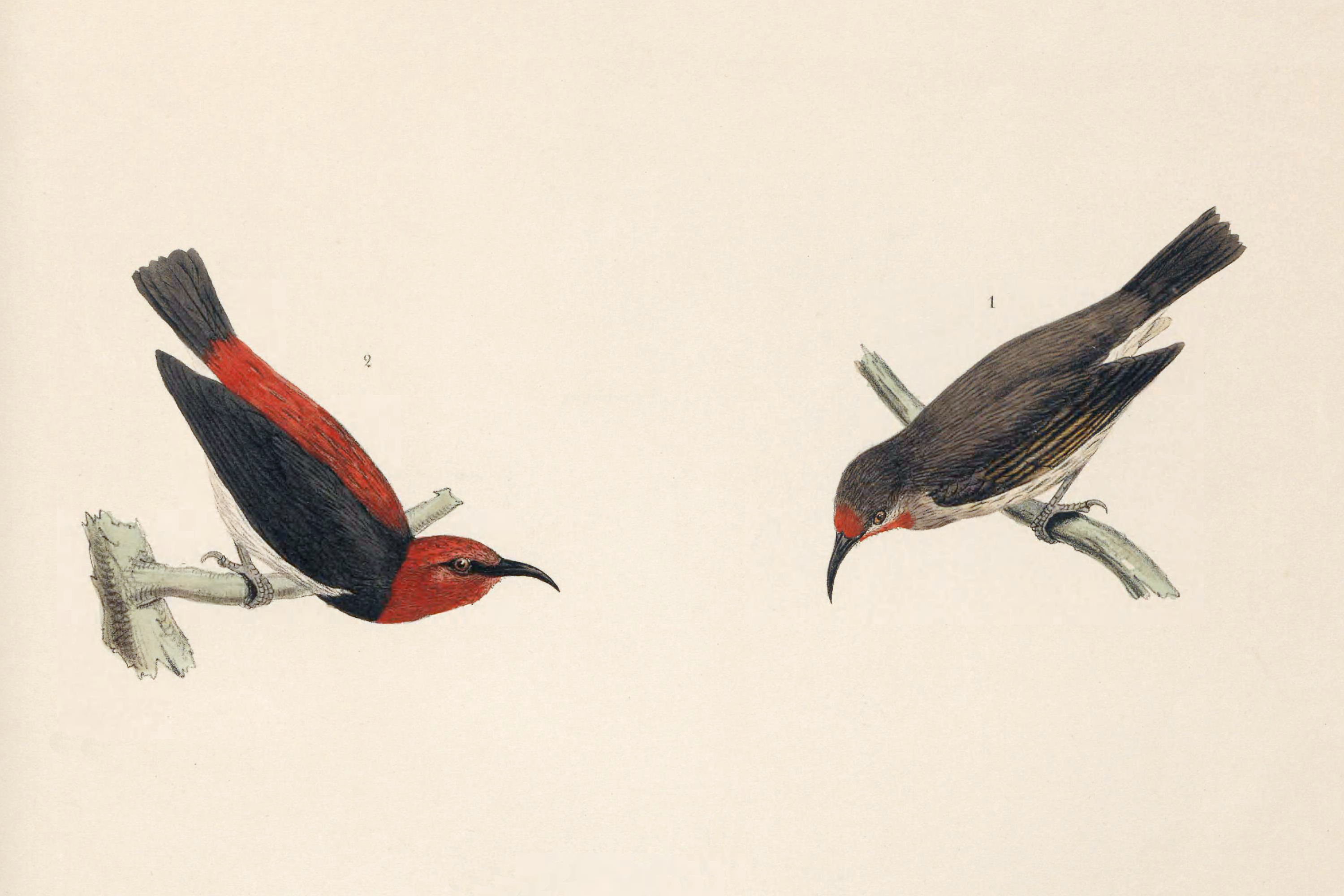
- 1843 illustration; male (left) and female (right)

Conservation status
- Least Concern (IUCN 3.1)

Scientific classification
- Kingdom: Animalia
- Phylum: Chordata
- Class: Aves
- Order: Passeriformes
- Family: Meliphagidae
- Genus: Myzomela
- Species: M. boiei

Binomial name
- Myzomela boiei (Müller, 1843)
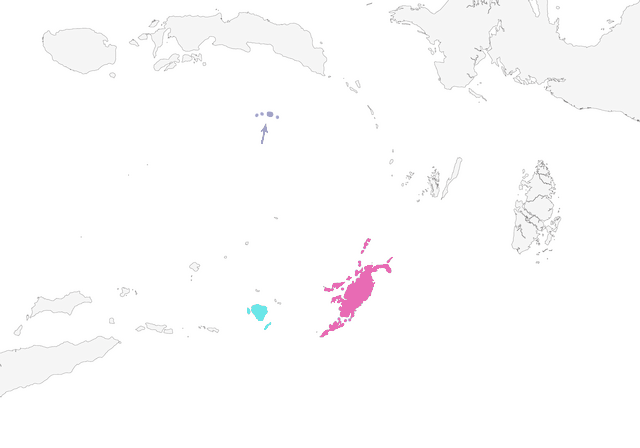
- Dark grey: Banda myzomela Myzomela boiei; Pink: Tanimbar myzomela Myzomela annabellae; Light blue: Babar myzomela Myzomela babarensis

= Banda Islands myzomela =

Species of bird

The Banda Islands myzomela (Myzomela boiei) is a bird species in the family Meliphagidae. It is endemic to Indonesia, and found in the Banda islands.

== Taxonomy ==
The Banda Islands myzomela was formally described in 1843 by the German naturalist Salomon Müller as Nectarinia (Myzomela) Boiei based on specimens collected on the Banda Islands. The specific epithet boiei was chosen to honour the memory of the German zoologist Heinrich Boie.

== Description ==
The species has sexual dimorphism. The male has a distinctive red head, neck, upper breast, and mantle, black eye ring, scapulars, and wings, a distinctive pointed beak and brown legs. The female is primarily brown, with an orange part underneath the also-pointed beak. The juveniles are not described.

== Habitat ==
Its natural habitats are subtropical or tropical moist lowland forests, subtropical or tropical mangrove forests, and subtropical or tropical moist montane forests. It is a possible nomadic species that changes its living place in the region and go foraging in twos (probably pairs), and sometimes in flocks. They have their eggs in September and the chicks fledge at April.
