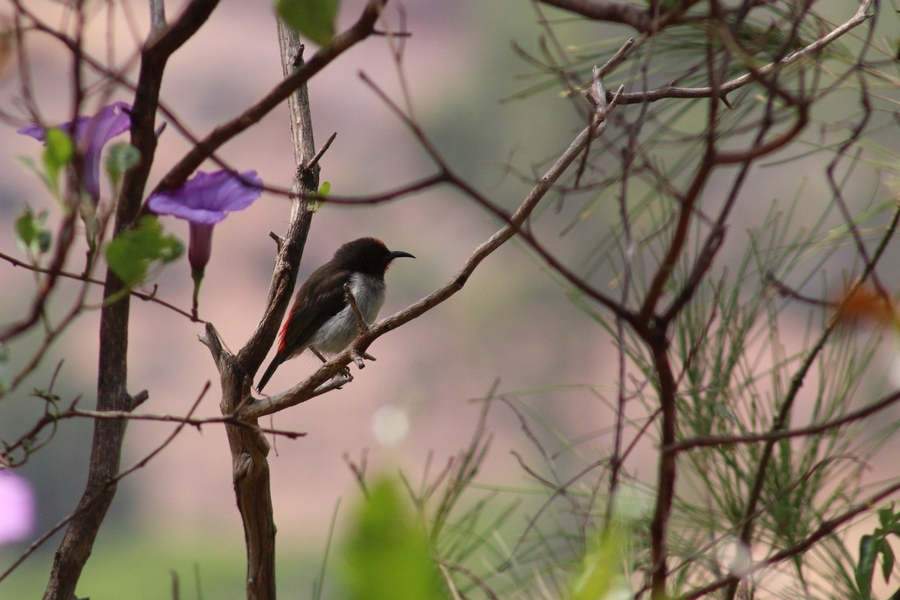

Conservation status
- Least Concern (IUCN 3.1)

Scientific classification
- Kingdom: Animalia
- Phylum: Chordata
- Class: Aves
- Order: Passeriformes
- Family: Meliphagidae
- Genus: Myzomela
- Species: M. vulnerata

Binomial name
- Myzomela vulnerata (Müller, 1843)

= Black-breasted myzomela =

Species of bird

The black-breasted myzomela or red-rumped myzomela (Myzomela vulnerata) is a species of bird in the family Meliphagidae. It is found on Timor island. Its natural habitat is subtropical or tropical dry forests.
