= Wetar myzomela =

Conservation status
- Least Concern (IUCN 3.1)

Scientific classification
- Kingdom: Animalia
- Phylum: Chordata
- Class: Aves
- Order: Passeriformes
- Family: Meliphagidae
- Genus: Myzomela
- Species: M. kuehni

Binomial name
- Myzomela kuehni Rothschild, 1903

Species of bird

The Wetar myzomela or crimson-hooded myzomela (Myzomela kuehni) is a species of bird in the family Meliphagidae. It is endemic to Wetar.

Its natural habitats are subtropical or tropical moist lowland forests, subtropical or tropical moist shrubland, and rural gardens. It is threatened by habitat loss.
