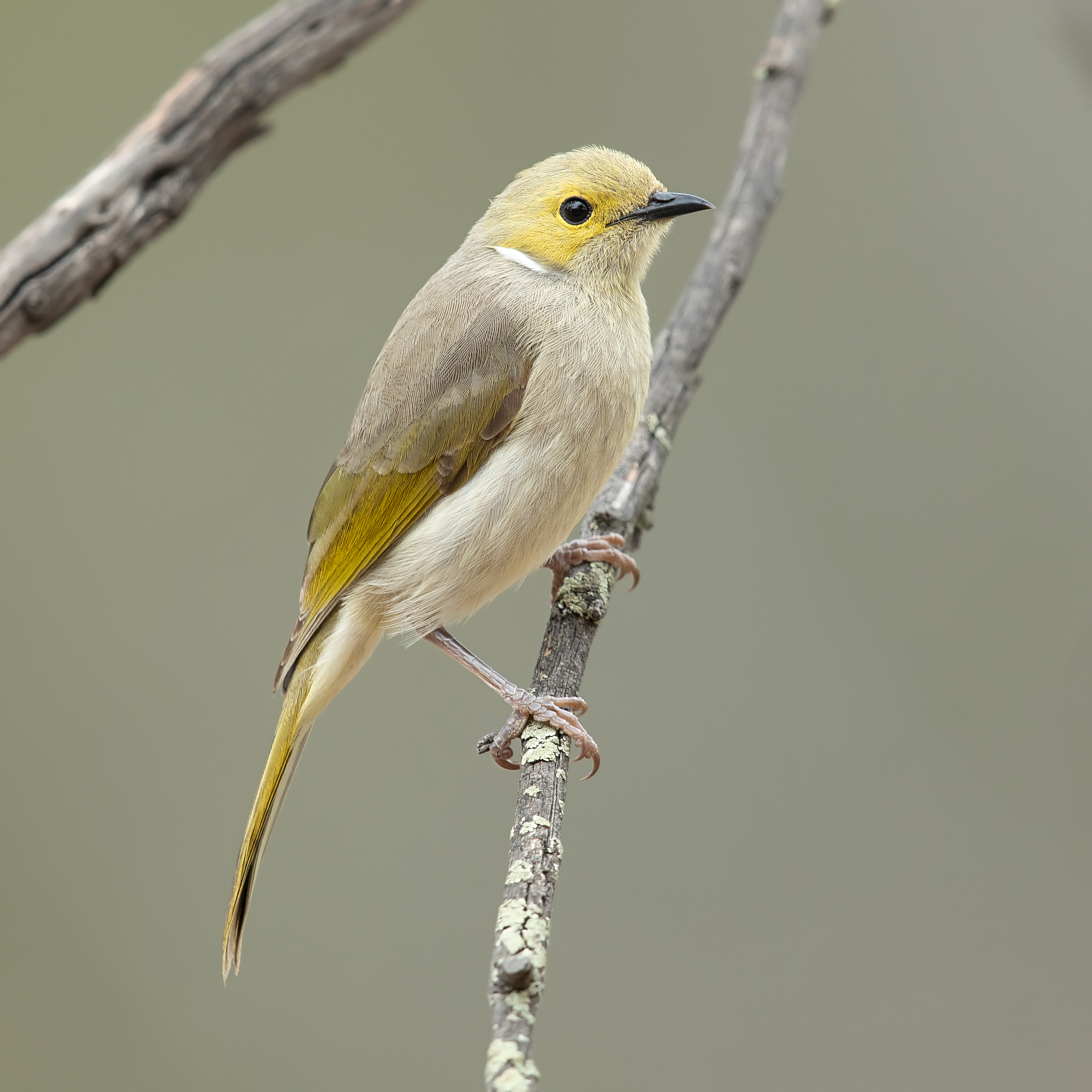
- At Glen Davis, New South Wales

Conservation status
- Least Concern (IUCN 3.1)

Scientific classification
- Kingdom: Animalia
- Phylum: Chordata
- Class: Aves
- Order: Passeriformes
- Family: Meliphagidae
- Genus: Ptilotula
- Species: P. penicillata

Binomial name
- Ptilotula penicillata (Gould, 1837)
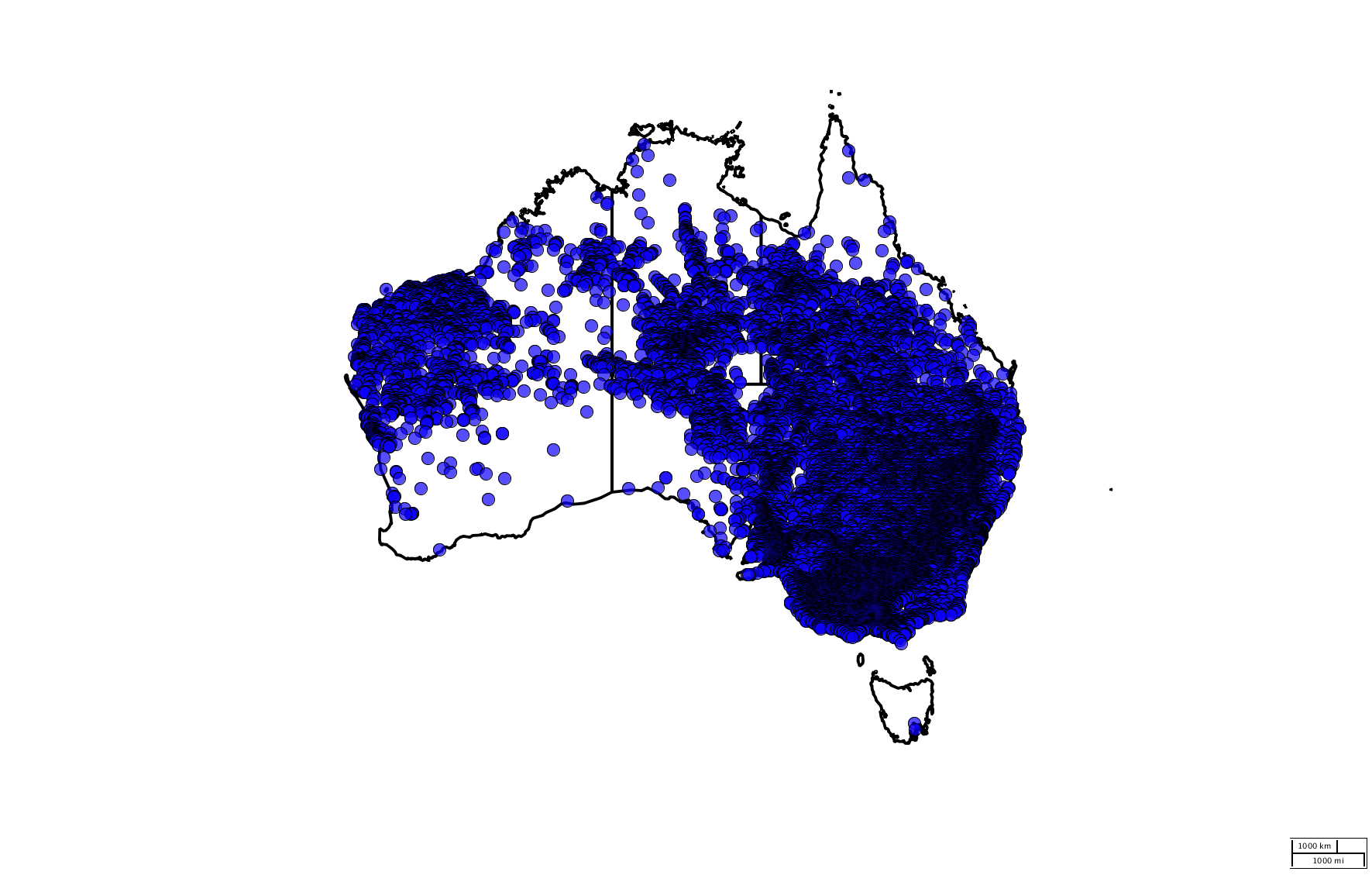
- Distribution

Synonyms
- Lichenostomus penicillatus

Audio
- Recorded at Cooya Pooya, Western Australia

= White-plumed honeyeater =

Species of bird

The white-plumed honeyeater (Ptilotula penicillata, formerly Lichenostomus penicillatus) is a medium-sized passerine of the family Meliphagidae (honeyeaters) endemic to mainland Australia. Its key identifying characteristics are a primarily olive-grey body and yellow face, a slightly down-curved bill and its white distal neck-plumes from which it takes its name. White-Plumed Honeyeaters exhibit a preference for woodlands and riparian areas and have a very strong association with River Red Gums. They exhibit a small seasonal migration from ranges to lower areas in winter. Today the species is most commonly seen through Victoria, South Australia and New South Wales, but is also found in regions of Western Australia and the Northern Territory. They are often seen in gardens and backyards with vegetation cover.

Honeyeaters are most diverse group of passerine birds on continental Australia and the White-plumed honeyeater is one of the most common honeyeaters of urban areas throughout much of Australia.

== Taxonomy ==
The first formal description of Ptilotula penicillata was by John Gould in 1837 who named it Lichenostomus penicillatus and placed it within the Ptilotula group within the Meliphagidae family. The Ptilotula group was then placed in the Lichenostomus genus by Richard Schodde in 1982 and which was supported by Leslie Christidis and Richard Schodde and other taxonomic studies in 1993 in light of new relations identified between species of the Meliphagidae family. Christidis and Schodde identified the subgroups ornatus, plumulus, fuscus, flavescens and penicillatus within this Ptilotula group. However, there was uncertainty in this placement with protein analyses not equating between different species and facial patterns the main distinguishing traits. Further studies using molecular techniques were advised by Christidis and Schodde to clarify the integrity of the species groupings they had postulated. Further work throughout the late 20th century and early 21st century confirmed that Lichenostomus was not monophyletic and further analysis of the species grouping was required to clarify the relationships between the different honeyeater genera.

Nyari and Joseph confirmed the recent finding that Lichenostomus is not monophyletic in 2011. They separated the previous members of the lichenostomus Honeyeater groupings into updated clades. Lichenostomus penicillata was renamed within the Ptilotula clade (named by Gregory M. Mathews in 1912) alongside P. flavescens, P. ornatus, P. plumulus (Grey-fronted Honeyeater), P. fuscus (Fuscous Honeyeater) and P. keartlandi (Grey-headed Honeyeater). These species all occupy open forests, woodlands, arid and semi-arid habitats throughout mainland Australia.

Its binomial name was now officially changed to Ptilotula penicillata with its subspecies naming changed from penicillatus to penicillata. This taxonomic naming was approved by the Australian Ornithologists Union after Nyari and Joseph's 2011 study was published.

== Description ==
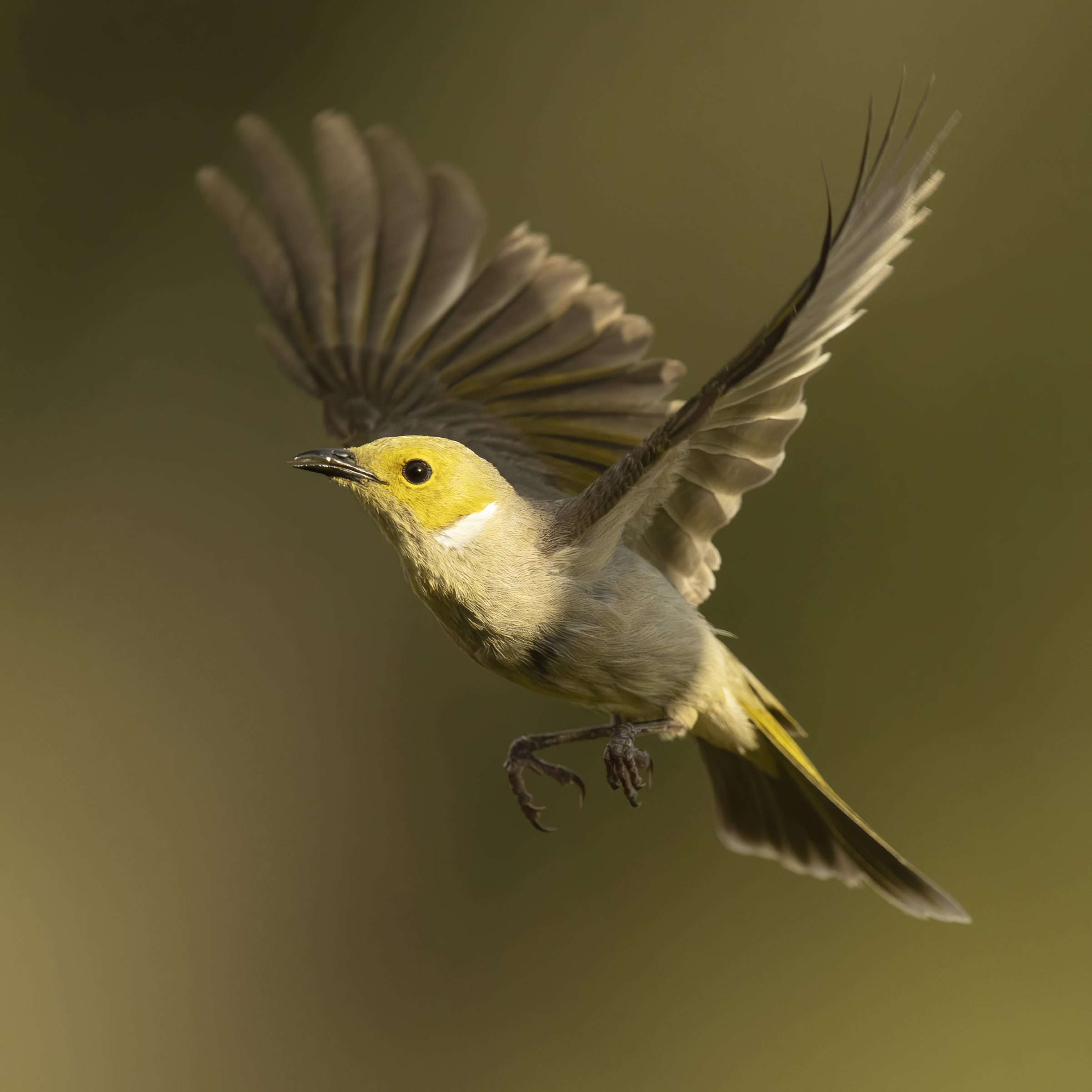
White-plumed Honeyeater in flight

Similar in appearance to the Yellow-plumed, Yellow-tinted, Fuscous and Grey-fronted Honeyeaters, the distinguishing feature of the White-plumed honeyeater is the distil white bands at its neck called neck-plumes. This is where its name is derived from with the species epithet penicillata deriving from the Modern Latin penicillatus meaning tufted or with brush-like tufts originating from the Latin word penicillus meaning a painter's brush. It is a medium-sized honeyeater with a yellowish head, pale grey-brown plumage below and yellowish-olive feathers on its back. Males and Females appear similarly with males only slightly larger than females.

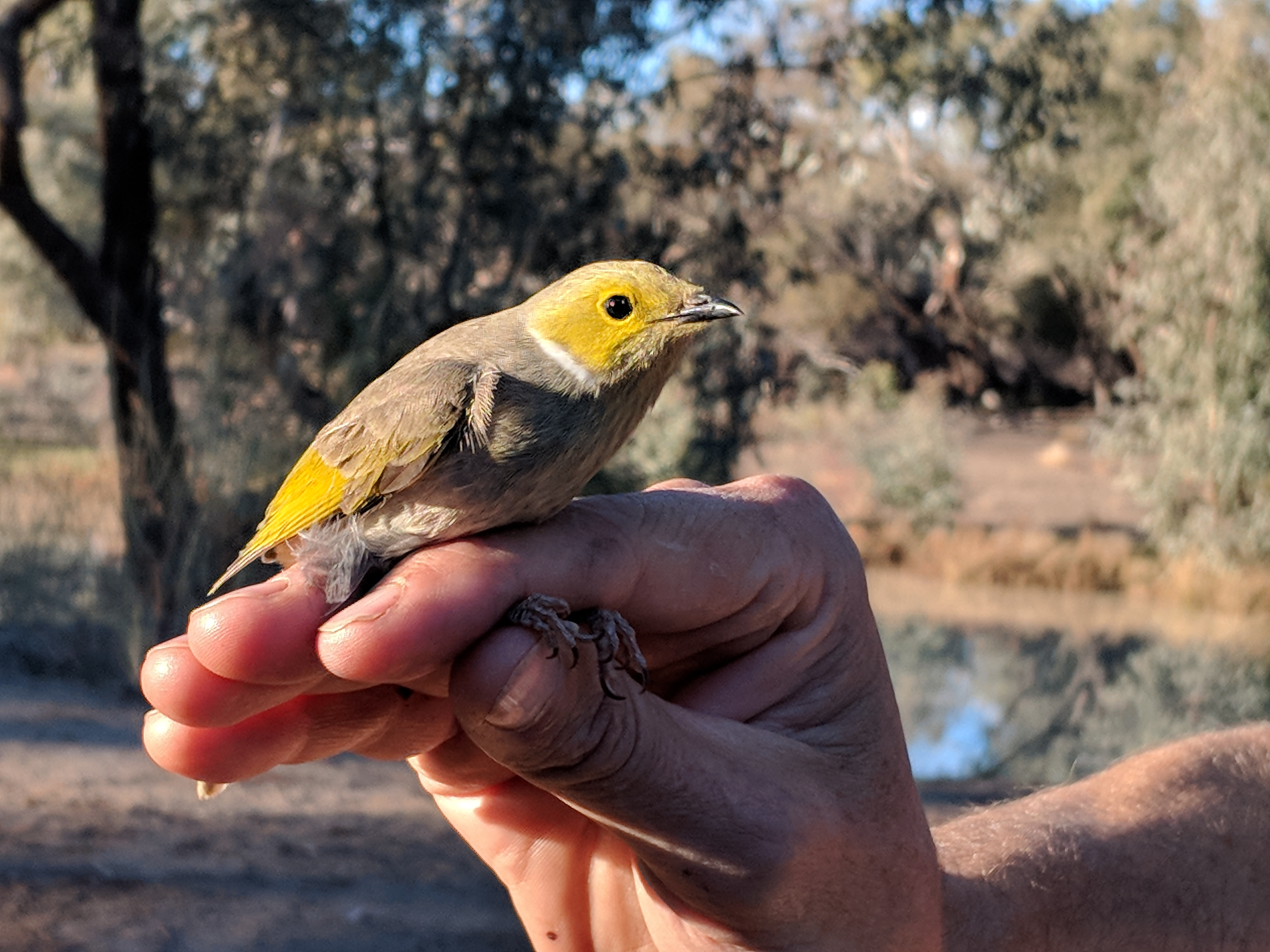
White-plumed Honeyeater (Ptilotula penicillata), caught during a survey at Toorale National Park, NSW, Australia

There is some variation in appearance seasonally and with breeding individuals. All adults are mostly uniform olive-grey with a yellowish tinge on upperparts. The wings are mostly brown with olive to yellow-olive edges or accents. The underwing coverts are white, and remiges are brownish grey and undertail is typically brownish-grey. the nape, crown, forehead and lores are olive and the eye-ring is yellow. Breeding and non-breeding adults are differentiated in appearance by the colour of bare parts. Breeding adults possess a black bill, nares, tomia and gape, whereas non-breeding adults possess a lighter or yellower tomia, yellow gape and browner leaning to yellow or orange bill.

Juveniles are distinguishable from adults via their duller, less yellow and stronger grey tones contrasting with brighter yellow ear-coverts and orbital ring. Shorter, narrower and less distinct white plume. Lighter and often pinkish base of the mandibles and tomia and swollen pale-yellow gape. The legs and feet of recently fledged individuals are paler, pinkish brown and more swollen than an adult.

== Voice ==
Consist of a variety of songs depending on locality as well as chip calls, described as a sharp, shrill descending chip noise, whistles, twittering (when congregated) and alarm calls which again vary depending on region. Tend to be the most vocal in July through to August in the South, and most vocal in the afternoons.

== Subspecies ==
Four subspecies are recognised: Ptilotula penicillata penicillata, P. p. leilavalensis, P. p. carteri and P. p. calconi.

P. p. leilavalensis is paler, more yellow and has a shorter wing and tail and weighs less than penicillata. It is more commonly found in the Flinders Ranges, SA, NSW and central QLD.

Adult P. p. carteri have shorter wings, tails and tarsus than P. p. penicillata, however, bills are slightly longer than the other three subspecies. Adult females also have a shorter tarsus and weigh less than adult female P. p. leilavalensis. Juvenile P. p. carteri are a brighter orange than P. p. leilavalensis.

P. p. calconi is very similar in appearance to P. p. carteri but are generally more pale yellow and grey-brown and bearing a blacker mantle. It is the smallest of the subspecies with males weighing around 17.5 g (0.62 oz) and females around 16 g (0.56 oz).

In all four races, males are slightly larger than females. P. p. penicillata is the largest, with males averaging 20.5 g (0.72 oz) and females 18.1 g (0.64 oz). P. p. leilavalensis and P. p. carteri are similar in size, where males are around 18 g (0.63 oz) and females16 g (0.56 oz).

Subspecies exhibit slight variations in colouring within their subspecies across their range. These subspecies intergrade where ranges overlap.

== Habitat, distribution and climate effects ==
=== Distribution ===
The White-Plumed Honeyeater is endemic to mainland Australia.

The species is widely distributed throughout south-eastern Australia (excluding Tasmania), up towards central Australia and in areas of central and western Queensland, Northern Territory and Western Australia.

In Queensland White-plumed Honeyeaters are widespread in the Gulf Country, in all areas West of the Great Dividing Range and South of 20°. They are reportedly rare East of the Great Divide.

White-Plumed Honeyeaters are widespread West of the Great Dividing Range in New South Wales, including within the Australian Capital Territory, but have a much patchier distribution East of the Great Divide, with larger populations near Sydney and in the Hunter Region.

In Victoria White-Plumed Honeyeaters are widespread West of the Great Dividing Range in the North, Northeast and North-central. They are far rarer at higher elevations of the Great Dividing Range, in Gippsland and in arid regions of the West, Southwest and Central Victoria.

In South Australia, the species is found most commonly in the East and Southeast with more arid areas of the North, Central, West and Southwest being mostly absent.

In Western Australia the species is most widespread in the northern areas of the Wheatbelt, Pilbara and Gascoyne Regions. There are some consistent records of occurrence in the South and Southwest Kimberley Region and in adjacent areas of the Great Sandy Desert, as well as nearer to Perth and Kellerberrin. Mostly reported as absent from regions South of 30°S.

The species is reported as widespread but scattered South of 18°S in the Northern Territory. There are rarer occurrences in the North and few and far reports of sightings from arid areas including the Simpson Desert.

Absent from Tasmania.

==== Subspecies distributions ====
The nominate race, P. p. penicillatus, occurs throughout south-eastern Australia to the Spencer Gulf in South Australia, and throughout the Murray-Darling basin. P. p. leilavalensis is found from Lake Eyre south to the Flinders Ranges in South Australia, east to the Barrier Ranges in western New South Wales, west to the edges of the Gibson and Great Sandy Deserts, and north to central-western Queensland. P. p. carteri occurs in the Pilbara region of WA from Geraldton to the Fortescue Ranges, and east to the Western Deserts; while P. p. calconi is known only from the southern Kimberley region.

=== Recent Range Changes ===
Between the 1940s and 1960s the species has undergone range expansion moving from being rare and only a seasonal visitor around Sydney, to having an established population there and extending its range to Newcastle from the Upper Hunter Valley. This involved the expansion of its habitat range from solely river red gum and a few other riverine species, to include coastal areas present in these regions.

There is a possibility it was once more widespread around the Illawarra Region and that the population in North Wollongong is a remnant of a previously larger one.

=== Movements ===
Mostly considered resident with some small more localised movements associated with change in season from higher elevation to lower elevations, and with water availability through the wet season and movements to more water associated habitat in drought. Juveniles are known to disperse widely from natal area on occasion. Prior to its establishment in the Sydney Region of NSW it was considered to have a small seasonal migration here during the Autumn and Winter months.

== Habitat ==
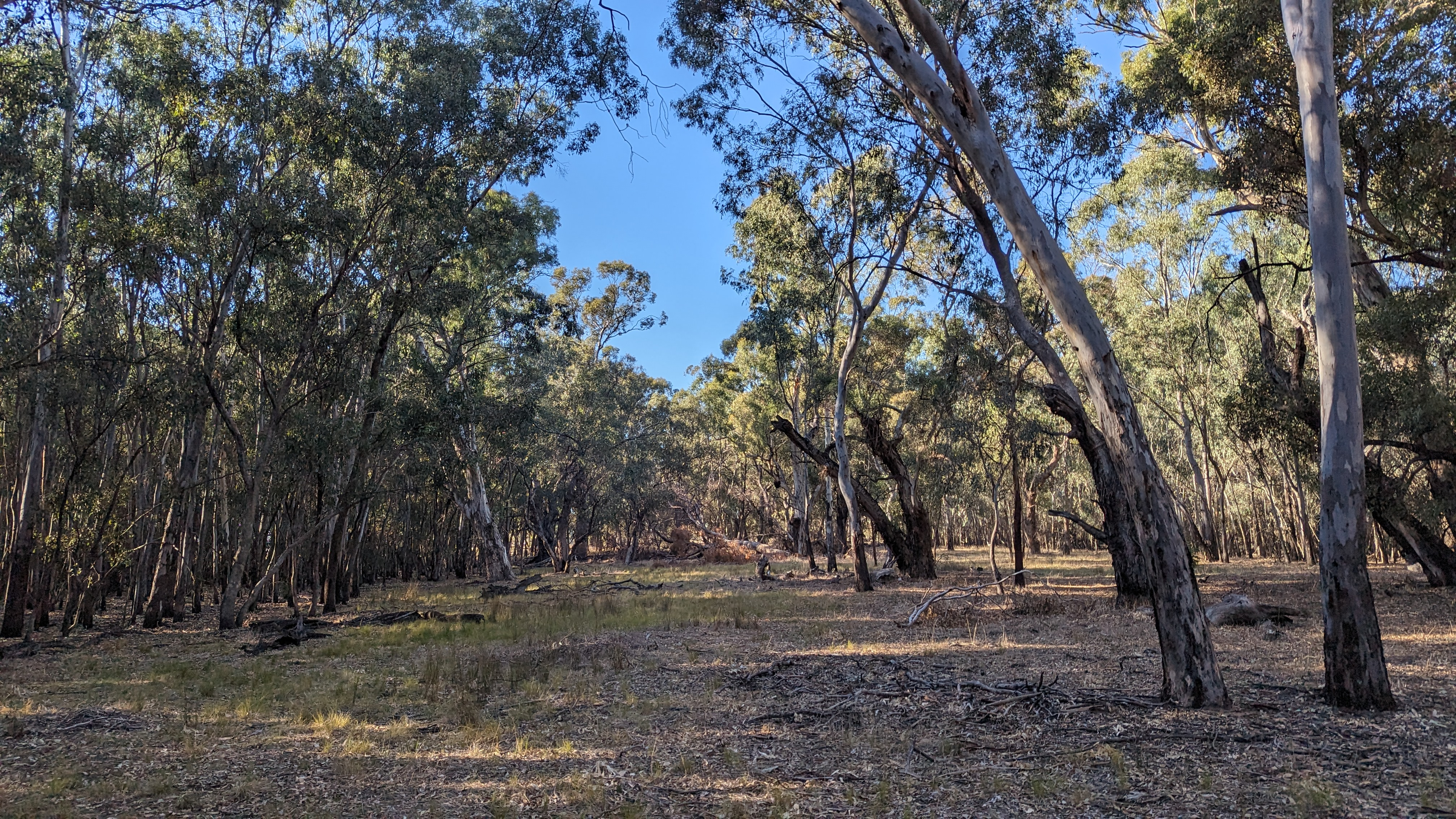
River Red Gum woodland, Dowdle Swamp Wildlife Reserve, VIC

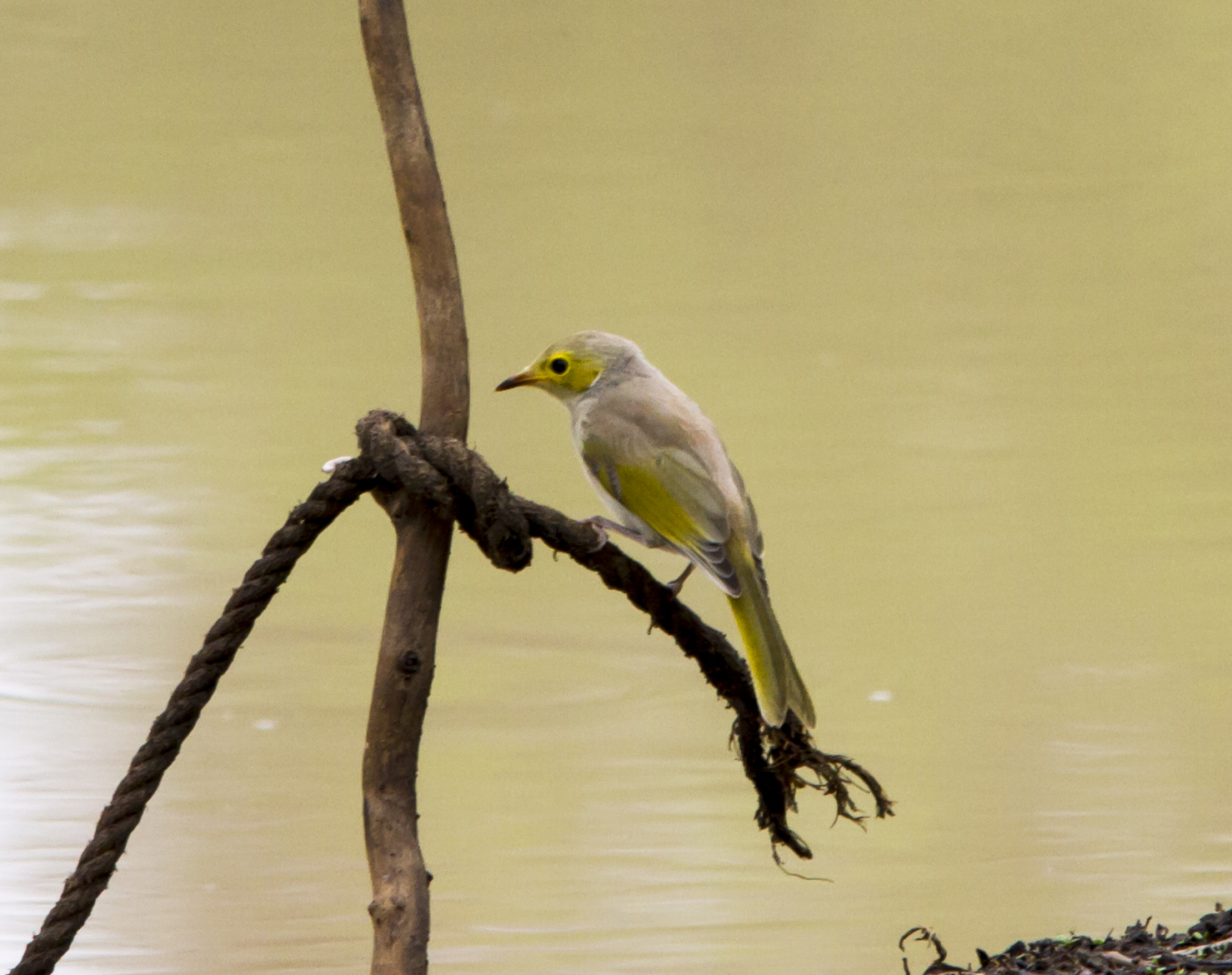
A juvenile white-plumed honeyeater (P. p. penicillatus) at Toorale Station, NSW

White-plumed honeyeaters are mainly arboreal. An arboreal species, it is mainly found in open sclerophyll woodland, often near water sources, such as wetlands, swamps, creeks, and dams. It is found extensively in river red gum woodlands, to which its range is reported to be most closely associated. It is also found in riparian woodlands dominated by Eucalyptus, but also including Melaleuca, Acacia or Casuarina species, as well as in mixed-forest on river flats and open mixed woodlands in grassy plains or adjacent to riparian areas. It is also reported in mixed-forest on nearby river flats or open mixed forest and woodland.

Is mostly recorded to be absent from sparsely vegetated arid areas and in areas without watercourses is reported to be attracted to water troughs.

== Diet ==
The white-plumed honeyeater's diet consists mainly of nectar, insects and their products (e.g., honeydew and lerp), manna, fruit, and very occasionally seeds. They may also peck at berries to feed on juice.

Information on diet comes from scats, stomach contents, and foraging observations. Stomach contents are heavily biased toward strong tissues from plants and arthropods. In 1980, it was found that manna, honeydew, and lerp were extremely important food resources. Other research indicated that insects were only a small part of the diet, when they were previously thought to be major components. However, this is debated with many sources reporting the prominence of insects in the diet with some studies reporting a ratio of approximately 2:1 insects to nectar in the diet. Insects are sometimes taken on the wing, but probably only provide a protein and mineral source, as a surplus of energy is available in nectar, lerp, and manna. The lower proportion of insects in the diet is a consequence of the fact that more energy is spent hawking prey than can be redeemed from the prey.

Where sufficient standing water occurs, P. penicillata can be observed drinking at least twice per day. In xeric habitats, additional moisture is obtained from food. A study in the Pilbara region of Western Australia found that white-plumed honeyeaters must eat around 100 berries to obtain 1mL of water. Needing 5-10mL per day, white-plumed honeyeaters were able to feed on 500–1000 berries in a five-hour period in order to obtain both caloric requirements and sufficient water intake.

== Foraging Behaviour ==
White-Plumed Honeyeaters mainly feed by gleaning leaf surfaces. The tongue contains brush-like filaments, consisting of about 60 bristles, which are capable of mopping up nectar. Arthropod prey is usually taken by gleaning, but some prey is taken on the wing. The species typically feeds in tree crowns, saplings or shrubs or from the foliage of flowers. Occasionally they will forage on the ground or glean insects from beneath tree bark.

In urban areas, they are typically canopy foragers but foraging heights can vary, depending on the influence of other resident species. For example, in the presence of aggressive competitors, such as fuscous honeyeaters, white-plumed honeyeaters avoid conflict by modifying their foraging behaviour. In one location, where ranges of the two species overlapped, white-plumed honeyeaters fed at lower heights in the overlap zone than they did in the riparian zone, where fuscous honeyeaters were absent.

They have occasionally been known to feed in loose flocks but no published data is known.

Young are reportedly fed by both parents on a diet of aphids and coccid scales however, few detailed studies have occurred.

== Social behavior ==
There is disproportionally little information on the species social behaviour giving how widespread it is. This is a gregarious species, often found in groups of 12 or more individuals during the nonbreeding season, which then dissipate during breeding. P. penicillata is considered colonial, with observations of colonies throughout their range. This makes them a likely candidate for cooperative breeding and there is some suggestion of this from records but little consistent evidence to support it occurring commonly. Communal breeding is likely, with conspecifics grouping to attack predators near nests. However, individual territories within communities are maintained, with territorial song frequency increasing during the breeding season.

Experiments with captive populations indicate that hierarchies form, based on plumage colour, gape flange characters, and voice, but no data from wild populations exists.

Foraging groups may use a chip-chip contact call, or a song which is repeated by nearby individuals. Corroborees of up to 12 or more individuals, sitting together on a branch, have been observed, which engage in extensive calling, followed by rapid dispersal.

=== Intraspecific Interactions ===
Observations of aggressive interactions between conspecifics and other species, such as the yellow-faced honeyeater (Caligavis chrysops), willie wagtail (Rhipidura leucophrys), red wattlebird (Anthochaera carunculata), and smaller species, such as pardalotes (Pardalotus spp.), mistletoebird (Dicaeum hirundinaceum), and other small honeyeaters have been made.

There are some observations of attacks on fuscous honeyeaters, but the two species tend to avoid each other, where they occur sympatrically with only some impacts of foraging behaviour reported to occur in some regions. In some regions, smaller birds are absent, due to the aggressive nature of white-plumed honeyeaters and other species of similar size, resulting in the exclusion of these poorer competitors.

== Life History ==
Females are relatively more ready to breed from late winter through to summer; however, males maintain enlarged testes throughout the year. Breeding occurs throughout their range with records in all months, and clutches typically produced 2–3 times per year. Breeding events usually coincide with outbreaks of herbivorous insects.

=== Courting Behaviour ===
Males undertake a song flight display, with a slight climbing and undulating flight above treetops while singing. At the song's completion, the male dives quickly into a nearby tree. This is performed throughout the day during breeding season, but less commonly in the early morning. Playback of this song does not induce territorial responses, suggesting the display is sexual in function. Other songs heard commonly after the breeding period begins may also have courtship functions.

=== Breeding ===
Breeding behaviours are reportedly relatively well known, however, no detailed studies have occurred. Females are relatively more ready to breed from late winter through to summer; however, males maintain enlarged testes throughout the year. Breeding occurs throughout their range with records in all months, and clutches typically produced 2–3 times per year. In Queensland breeding mainly occurs in February through to September, in NSW, Victoria and SA mostly in the Spring. Breeding events usually coincide with outbreaks of herbivorous insects.

The clutch is usually 2–3 eggs, varying from 1–4 overall. The second egg is typically laid within 24 hours of the first. Eggs are approximately 20 mm × 15 mm (0.8 in × 0.6 in), weighing 2.45 g (0.09 oz); oval, smooth, finely grained, and may be slightly glossy. Colour varies from white to pale buff or deep pink, minutely spotted with chestnut-red freckles towards the larger end. Eggs laid late in season tend to be lighter, and those from inland populations tend to be white with fewer markings.

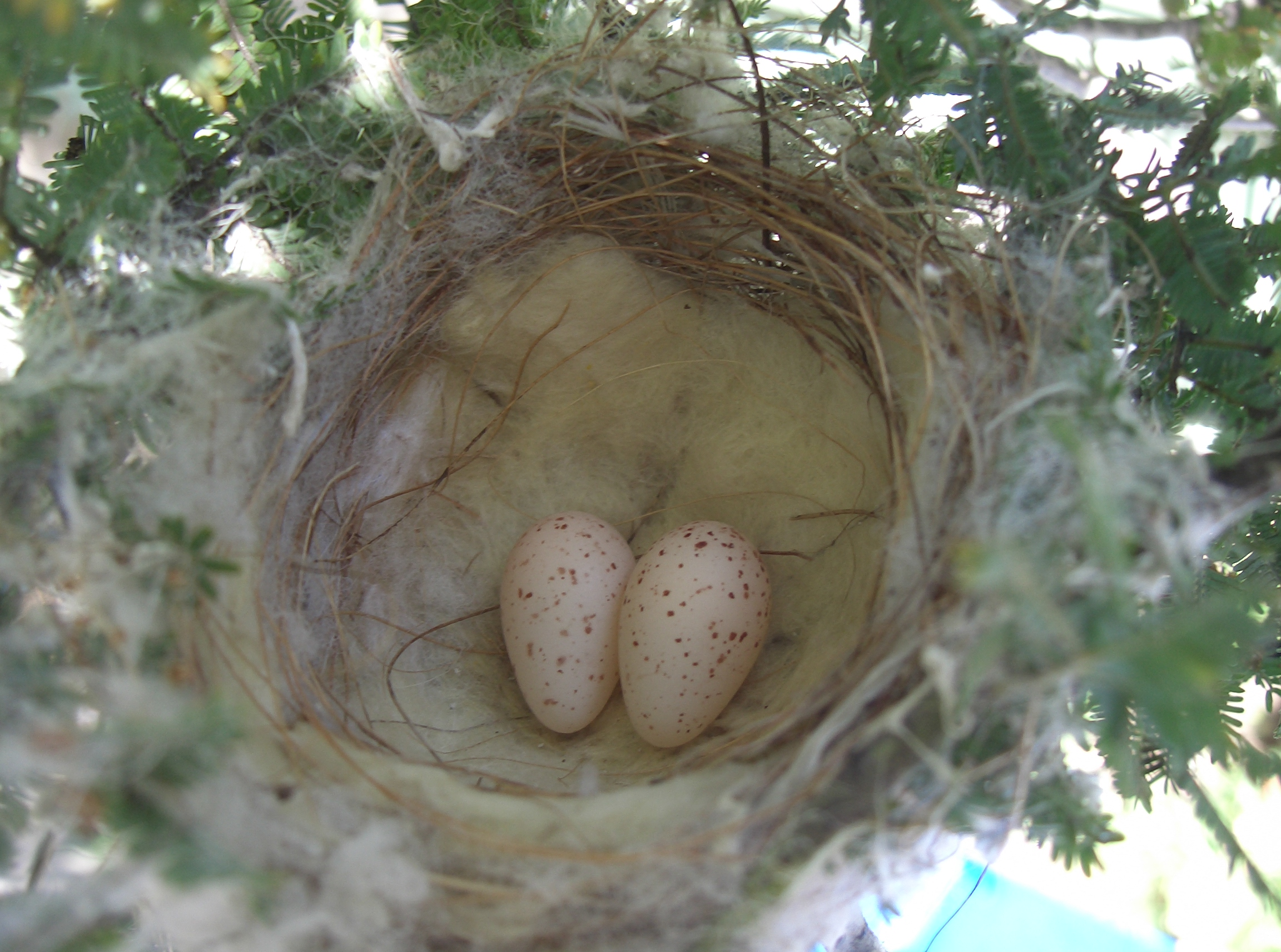
Nest with two eggs

=== Nests ===
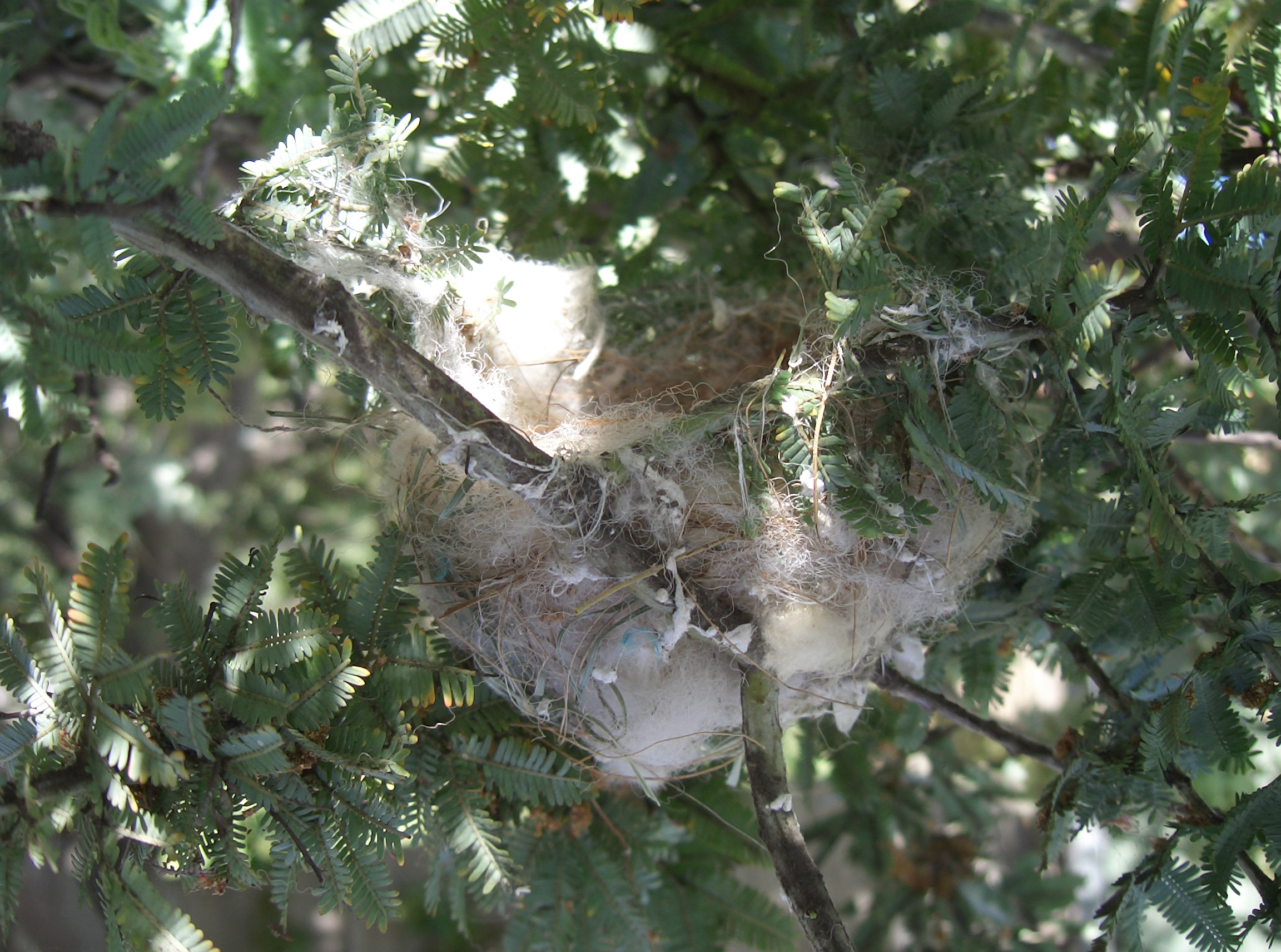
The cup nest

Nests are small and cup-shaped, 5–6 cm (2.0–2.4 in) in diameter and similar depth. These are skillfully woven from grasses and fine bark strips, bound with spider webs, and lined with animal hair, wool, and feathers. The female appears to be responsible for construction, but both sexes maintain and make repairs. Nests are usually located among the foliage in crowns of trees or shrubs, and only rarely seen in mistletoe. Sometimes nests are constructed in forks or on branches, and rarely in dead foliage. There is conflicting evidence on whether nests occur colonially with some records recording multiple nests in close proximity while others in isolation. There is some evidence of site fidelity and nest trees may be shared with active nests maintained by several other species, including wagtails, magpie-lark, woodswallows, and other honeyeater species.

Incubation of eggs is most likely solely by the female for a period of 13–15 days. Both parents feed the offspring during the nestling period of 11–15 days, and then for a further 2 weeks after fledging until independence.

The nests are parasitized by pallid (Cacomantis pallidus) and fan-tailed cuckoos (Cacomantis flabelliformis) and Horsfield's (Chrysococcyx basalis) and shining bronze-cuckoos (Chrysococcyx lucidus).

== Conservation status ==
The white-plumed honeyeater is considered by the International Union for Conservation of Nature (IUCN) to be of least concern for conservation and this is also the case for all Australian states and territories.

== Threats ==
Exotic vertebrate predators, such as cats and dogs, are a direct threat to white-plumed honeyeater populations. Loss of trees and vegetation from watercourses are also a direct threat. They are able to adapt to suburban environments, especially where native gardens are present and thus habitat loss may result in species movements into these areas.

== Climate effects ==
The white-plumed honeyeater body-size has been observed to change over recent decades, with individuals becoming smaller in extended drought, but showing an overall trend towards larger body-size since the 1960s. This is correlated with increasing temperatures in the regions surveyed, with body size increasing by 0.064% per year. Range changes are further likely to occur as climatic conditions and water availability becomes more variable.
