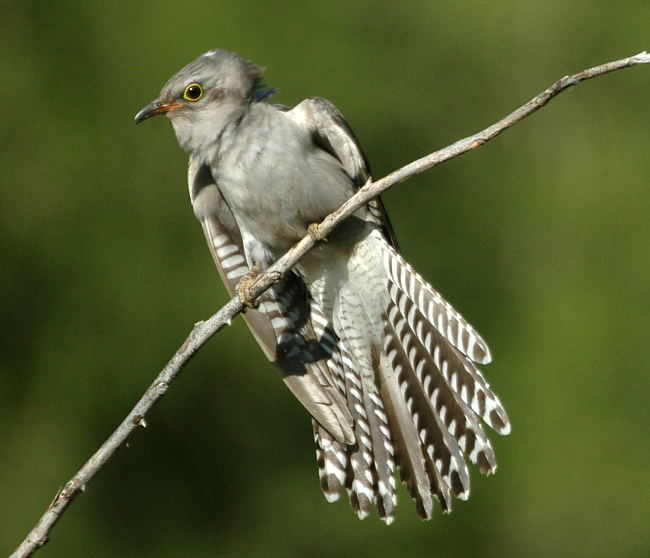

Conservation status
- Least Concern (IUCN 3.1)

Scientific classification
- Kingdom: Animalia
- Phylum: Chordata
- Class: Aves
- Order: Cuculiformes
- Family: Cuculidae
- Genus: Heteroscenes; Cabanis & Heine 1862
- Species: H. pallidus

Binomial name
- Heteroscenes pallidus (Latham, 1801)

Synonyms
- Cuculus pallidus; Cacomantis pallidus

= Pallid cuckoo =

Species of bird

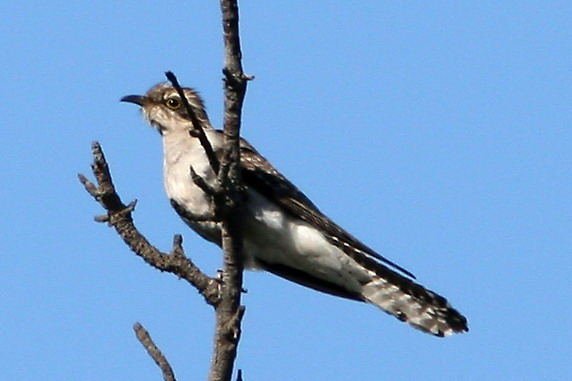
Immature pallid cuckoo (Cacomantis pallidus)

The pallid cuckoo (Heteroscenes pallidus) is a species of cuckoo in the family Cuculidae. It is the only species placed in the genus Heteroscenes. It is found in Australia, with some migration to the islands of Timor and Papua New Guinea. It is between 28 and 33 cm (11 and 13 in) in size, with distinctive markings such as a dark bill, a dark eye with a gold eye-ring and olive grey feet which differentiate it from other cuckoos. The pallid cuckoo is similar in appearance to the oriental cuckoo (Cuculus optatus), with barred immature pallid cuckoos being often mistaken for oriental cuckoos.

== Taxonomy ==
English ornithologist John Latham described the pallid cuckoo in 1801 as Columba pallida "pale pigeon".

Sources differ in the genera placement of this species. It is commonly placed in Cuculus, but genetic evidence and its song support its placement in Cacomantis, with its closest relative the white-crowned cuckoo (Cacomantis leucolophus).

"Pallid cuckoo" has been designated the official name by the International Ornithological Committee (IOC). Other common names include unadorned cuckoo, semitone-bird, scale-bird, and brain-fever bird—from its monotonous repetitive call.

== Description ==
Characteristics of the appearance of the pallid cuckoo include: a dark bill, a dark eye with a gold eye-ring, a shadowy dark mark from the eye down the neck, a white (or buff) mark on the nape, olive grey feet and prominent white (or buff) toothing along the tail. In flight, there are conspicuous white and dark bars across the long tail. Its silhouette resembles a falcon and often triggers alarm calls from passerines. The pallid cuckoo can have various morphs including light rufous morph or dark rufous morph.

In adult males the upperparts including head and neck are grey-brown and have large spots on wing-coverts. In adult females the light-rufous morph is similar to the adult male however with the dark rufous morph the hind neck patch extends onto mantle and it has barring on the chest.

A distinguishing feature of the family Cuculidae are the feet, which are zygodactyl, meaning that the two inner toes point forward and the two outer point backward.

== Distribution and habitat ==
The pallid cuckoo is widely distributed throughout mainland Australia and Tasmania. It spends the winter months in central inland Australia and the Northern Territory. The cuckoo then migrates to South East Australia's coastal region and Tasmania, arriving generally around September or October, sometimes earlier. It has also been observed that migration occasionally occurs to the islands of Timor and Papua New Guinea in the winter months. It is a rare vagrant to New Zealand.

The pallid cuckoo has been observed in various different habitats such as in woodland, shrubland, mangrove forest, pastoral country, farmland, golf courses and gardens. However it prefers lightly timbered country with trees and shrubs and a sparse under-story where it can best hunt for prey.

== Behaviour and ecology ==
=== Food and feeding ===
The pallid cuckoo predates primarily on insects such as caterpillars, by hopping down from vantage points to seize their prey either on trees or in the grass. It prefers to eat hairy caterpillars.

=== Breeding ===
Breeding of the pallid cuckoo occurs between July and December. The pallid cuckoo is a generalist brood parasite. Brood parasites lay their eggs in the nests of other species, abandoning their egg and leaving it to the care of the host bird whose nest it is in. If the host does not detect the intrusion and subsequently reject the egg it will raise the resulting chick as its own. The pallid cuckoo is recorded to have exploited over 100 different species of passerines, though not all of these have been observed to raise chicks to fledgling.

Hosts observed to raise chicks to fledgling include the hooded robin, dusky robin, jacky-winter, golden whistler, rufous whistler, willie wagtail, red wattlebird, little wattlebird, bell miner, noisy miner, yellow-throated miner, yellow-faced honeyeater, singing honeyeater, white-eared honeyeater, yellow-throated honeyeater, yellow-tufted honeyeater, yellow-plumed honeyeater, grey-fronted honeyeater, fuscous honeyeater, white-plumed honeyeater, black-chinned honeyeater, strong-billed honeyeater, brown-headed honeyeater, white-naped honeyeater, black-headed honeyeater, eastern spinebill, western spinebill, white-breasted woodswallow, masked woodswallow, white-browed woodswallow, black-faced woodswallow and dusky woodswallow. Of these, all major hosts belong to the family Meliphagidae.
