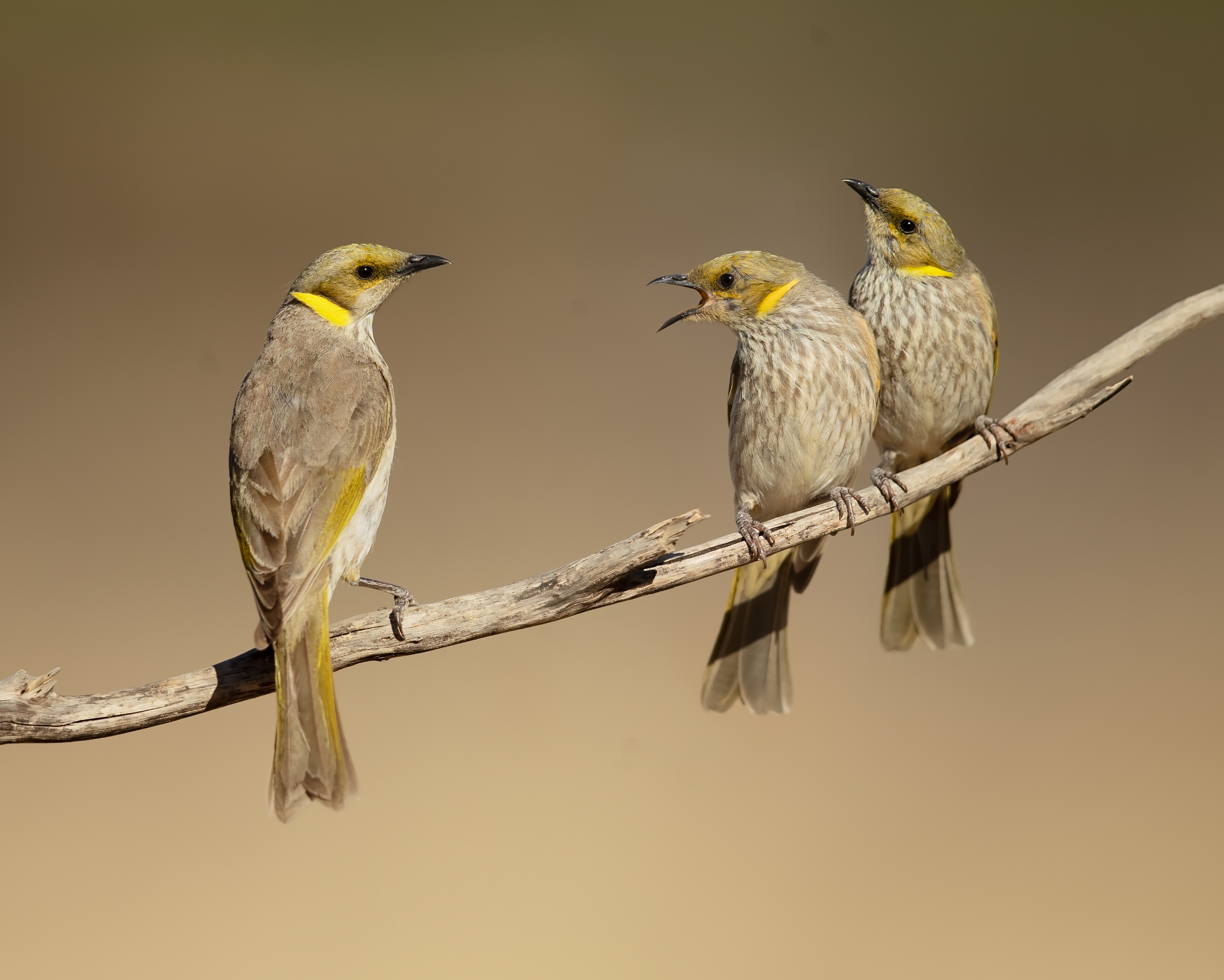

Conservation status
- Least Concern (IUCN 3.1)

Scientific classification
- Kingdom: Animalia
- Phylum: Chordata
- Class: Aves
- Order: Passeriformes
- Family: Meliphagidae
- Genus: Ptilotula
- Species: P. ornata

Binomial name
- Ptilotula ornata (Gould, 1838)

Synonyms
- Lichenostomus ornatus

= Yellow-plumed honeyeater =

Species of bird

The yellow-plumed honeyeater (Ptilotula ornata) is a species of bird in the family Meliphagidae. It is endemic to Australia, where it inhabits temperate forests and Mediterranean-type shrubby vegetation.

The yellow-plumed honeyeater was previously placed in the genus Lichenostomus, but was moved to Ptilotula after a molecular phylogenetic analysis, published in 2011, showed that the original genus was polyphyletic.

== Description ==
The yellow-plumed honeyeater is a medium-sized honeyeater with a relatively long, down-curved black bill, a dark face and a distinctive, upswept yellow neck plume. It has an olive-green head, with a faint yellow line under the dark eye, grey-green upperparts, and heavily streaked grey-brown underparts. Young birds have a yellow bill base and eye-ring.

Similar species include purple-gaped honeyeater, grey-fronted honeyeater and fuscous honeyeater.

=== Call ===
The song is a loud, clear, three-note chier wit chier, often performed before dawn, and by males during display flight.

== Distribution ==
The yellow-plumed honeyeater is endemic to southern mainland Australia, from western New South Wales and Victoria, through South Australia to south-west Western Australia.

== Ecology and behaviour ==
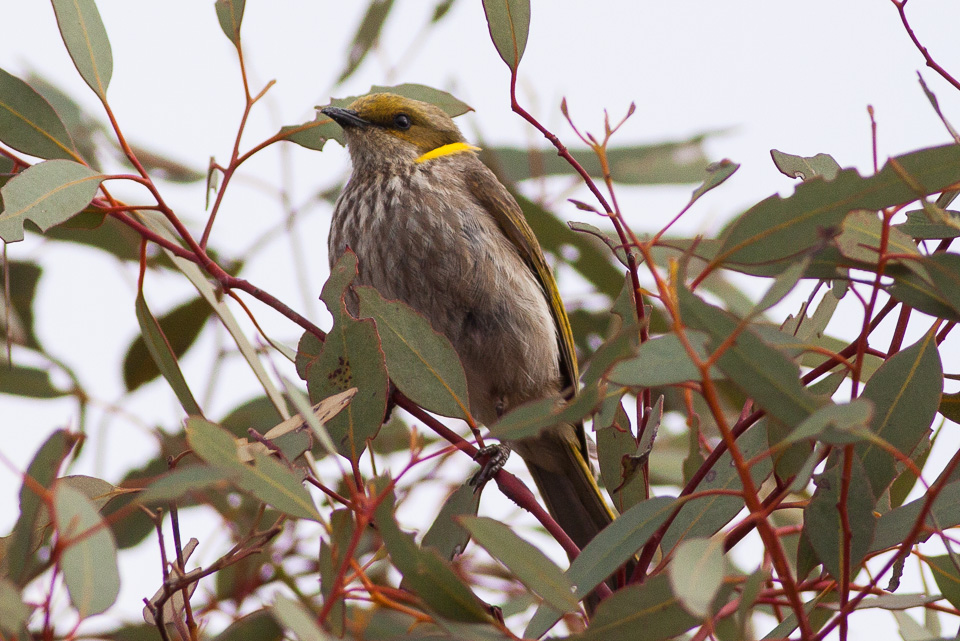
Yellow-plumed honeyeater in eucalypt canopy

The main habitat type for yellow-plumed honeyeater is mallee. They occupy a broader range of habitat in the west of their range, including dry eucalypt woodland and eucalypt open-forest. They occasionally occur outside their usual habitat, such as in Acacia and Callitris woodland, and seasonally in flowering red ironbark forest, flowering grey box-yellow box woodland.

They occur in sedentary, colonial groups, which may relocate in response to harsh conditions. They are noisy and conspicuous, and will jointly defend nesting or feeding territories, by engaging in communal wing quivering displays.

=== Diet ===
Yellow-plumed honeyeaters are mainly insectivorous, foraging actively mainly in outer and upper foliage, branches and trunks of eucalypts, and taking insects on the wing by hawking. They also feed opportunistically on nectar, including from various mallee eucalypts, yellow gum, grey box, red ironbark, and box mistletoe.

=== Reproduction ===
Yellow-plumed honeyeaters build an open, cup-shaped nest suspended by the rim from foliage or from a thin fork of mallee eucalypts and other small shrubs. Nests are made from wool, green grass and spider webs, and lined with wool, grasses, plant-down and brightly-coloured feathers. Both parents feed the young, sometimes with the assistance of helpers.

Yellow-plumed honeyeater nests are parasitised by fan-tailed cuckoos, pallid cuckoos, Horsfield's bronze-cuckoos and shining bronze-cuckoos.

== Conservation actions ==
=== Conservation status ===
The species is listed under the IUCN Red List of Threatened Species as a species of Least Concern.

=== Protected areas ===
The yellow-plumed honeyeater occurs in several protected areas, including:

- New South Wales

* Pulletop Nature Reserve

- South Australia

* Gluepot Reserve

- Victoria

* Greater Bendigo National Park
* Inglewood Nature Conservation Reserve
* Wychitella Nature Conservation Reserve
