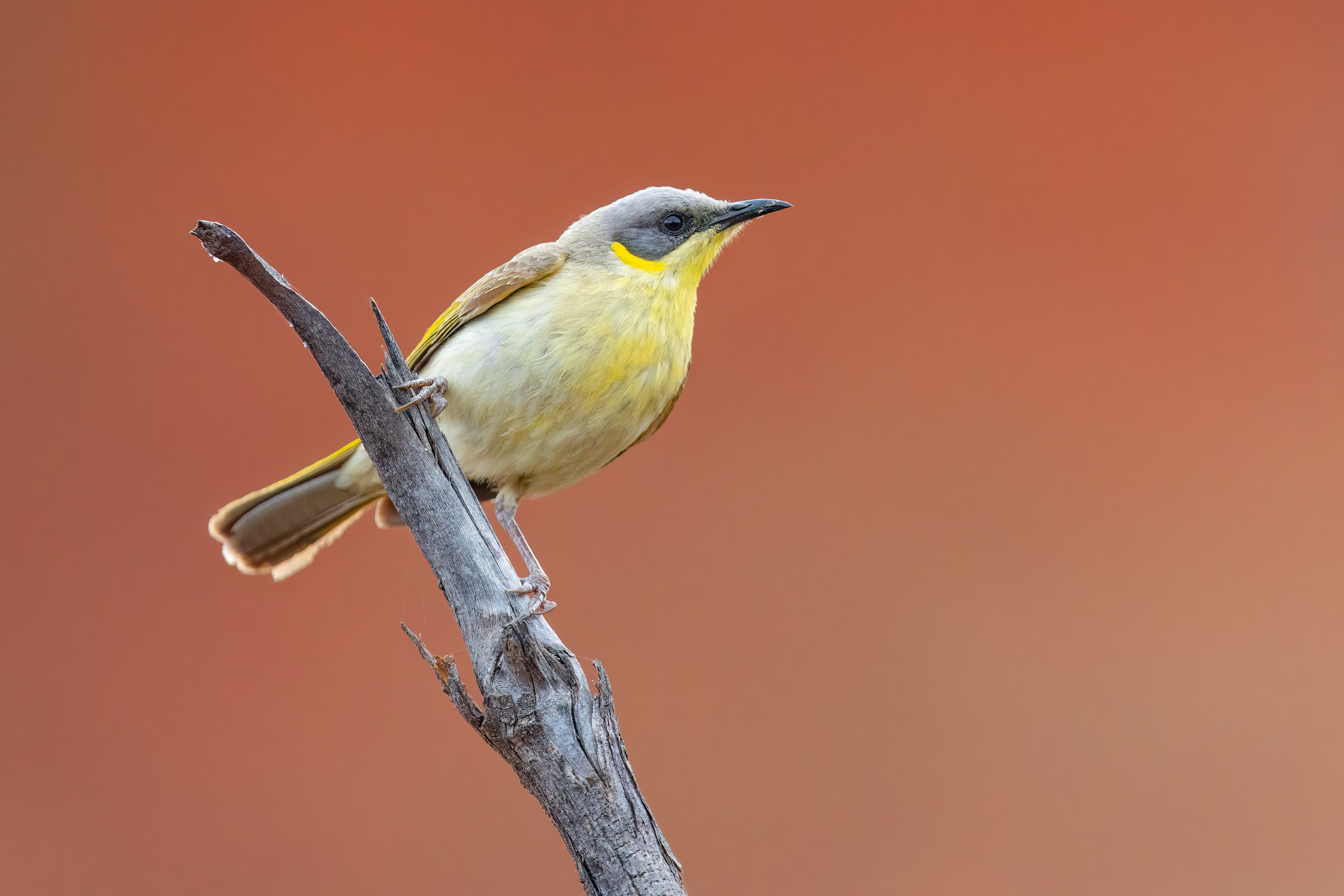
- At Kings Canyon, Northern Territory

Conservation status
- Least Concern (IUCN 3.1)

Scientific classification
- Kingdom: Animalia
- Phylum: Chordata
- Class: Aves
- Order: Passeriformes
- Family: Meliphagidae
- Genus: Ptilotula
- Species: P. keartlandi

Binomial name
- Ptilotula keartlandi (North, 1895)
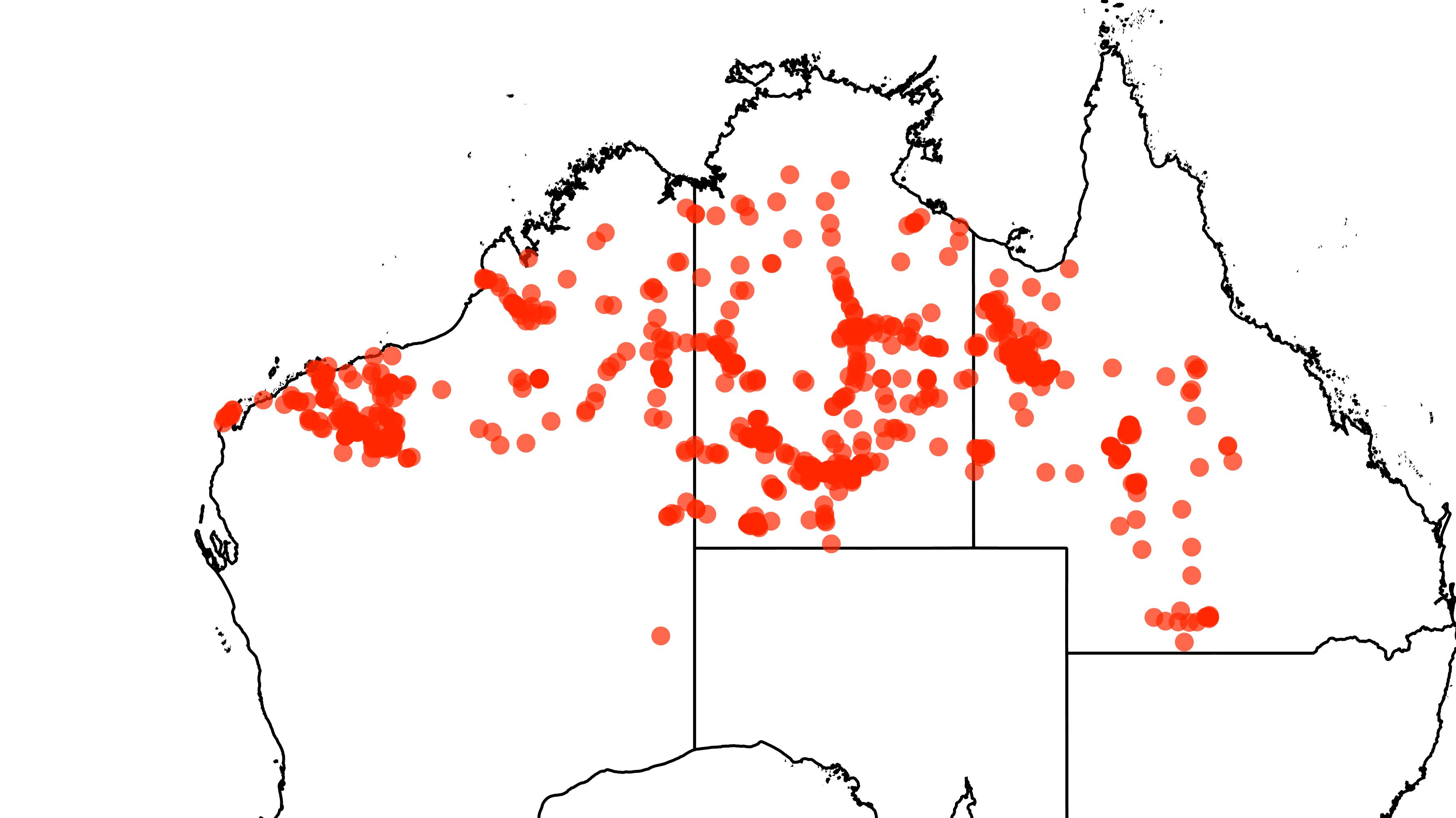
- Location records from Ebird data

Synonyms
- Lichenostomus keartlandi

= Grey-headed honeyeater =

Species of bird

The grey-headed honeyeater (Ptilotula keartlandi) is a species of bird in the family Meliphagidae. It is endemic to Australia.

== Nomenclature, taxonomy and evolutionary history ==
First described as Ptilotis keartlandi in 1895 by Australian ornithologist Alfred John North, the grey-headed honeyeater is named in honour of the ornithological collector George Arthur Keartland, who collected the type specimen. The taxonomy of the species has been complex since its description. For example, the species was listed in the genus Meliphaga in 1926 by the Royal Australian Ornithological Union Official Checklist of Birds, and then in the genus Lichenostomus by Schodde in 1975. Most recently, the grey-headed honeyeater has been placed in the genus Ptilotula, which contains five other Australian species that all share characteristically plain faces, subtended by a black proximal and yellow or white distal plume across the side of the neck. The generic name Ptilotula derives from Ancient Greek ptilon 'feather' and the diminutive of otis 'ear'.

While the species in Ptilotula occupy a wide range of forest, woodland, arid and semi-arid habitats, they share a common ancestor, which inhabited the dry woodlands of central Australia. A fossil leg-bone from an unnamed Pliocene species found in Riversleigh, Queensland, described by Walter Boles, may well belong to this ancestor.

== Description and identifying features ==
Grey-headed honeyeaters are relatively small for honeyeaters with a total body length of 13–16.5 cm (5.1–6.5 in) and a weight of 12–18 g (0.4–0.6 oz). Individual wing length ranges from 67–81 mm (2.6–3.2 in), the tail is 55–69 mm (2.2–2.7 in) long, and the bill is 14.5–18.5 mm (0.6–0.7 in) in length.

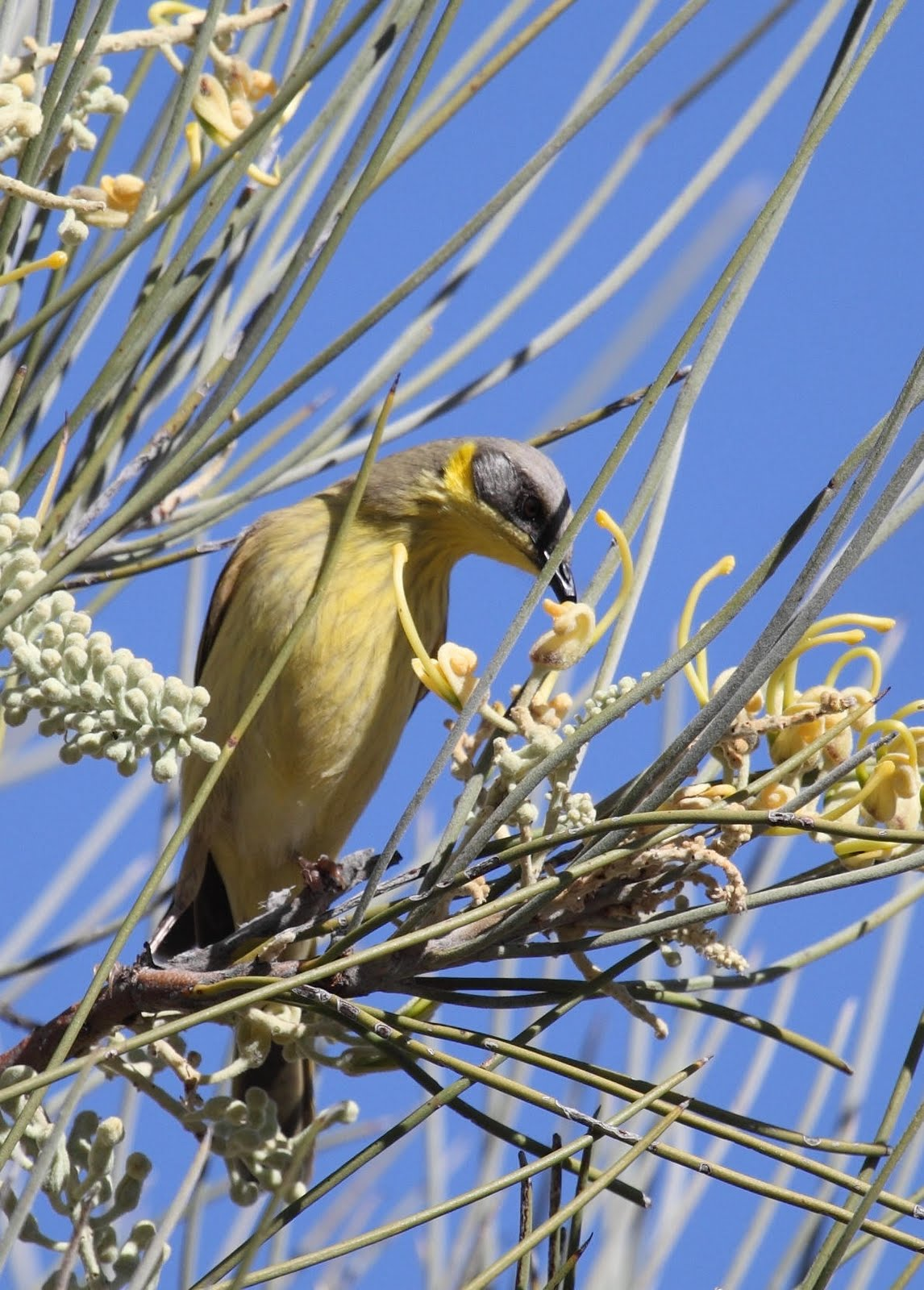
An adult grey-headed honeyeater feeding, Northern Territory

Adults have a distinctive grey crown above a black facial mask with the nape and remaining upper body parts coloured dark fawn-grey. The black facial mask extends from the base of the bill to the rear of the ear coverts, and comprises black lores, eye rings, feathers behind the eye, and grey-black ear coverts. The base of the mask is bordered by a thin, bright yellow plume which extends below and behind the ear coverts and a pale yellow, moustachial stripe located between the lores and throat.

The bill is black, short and slightly down-curved with a yellow base on the lower mandible, although it may become fully black during breeding. The iris is black to dark brown, while the gape is yellow, turning black during breeding.

The breast, belly, flanks, and throat are light olive-yellow streaked with brown, while the rump is light grey-brown. The flight feathers are olive-brown, edged with olive-yellow, which gives the wing a yellow panel when folded. The tail feathers are dark olive-brown edged in olive-yellow. There are ten primary flight feathers, ten secondaries and twelve tail feathers.

There is no plumage difference between the sexes; however, there is some sexual dimorphism, as males are slightly heavier and larger than females. There is no geographical variation in plumage across the species range.

Juveniles have similar plumage to adults, but are generally paler with a lighter grey-brown face mask. Juveniles also have grey-black bills with an orange-brown base, yellow gapes, and a lighter grey crown. Juveniles partially moult into immature plumage soon after fledging and, while immature plumage is similar to adult plumage, juvenile tail and flight feathers are retained, and immatures can be identified by the presence of fault bars in the tail. Moult into adult plumage occurs in the first year.

The grey-headed honeyeater produces a continuous, peevish chip call when feeding, and a wee-wee-wee song. Other vocalisations include a loud, single kwoyt and chee-toyt, which is possibly only emitted during breeding.

== Distribution and habitat ==
The grey-headed honeyeater has an extensive range covering much of central arid and semi-arid Australia. The extent of occurrence is estimated at 4,360,000 square kilometres (1,680,000 sq mi).

The grey-headed honeyeater mostly frequents Eucalyptus scrub and woodlands in stony hill country and timbered gullies within ranges; however, it can be observed on sand-plains, when vegetation is flowering. The species has also been recorded in mulga and mallee woodlands, riverine areas dominated by river red gum (Eucalyptus camaldulensis), and occasionally in Mitchell grasslands.

The grey-headed honeyeater is thought to be largely sedentary; however, it undertakes nomadic movements in response to flowering events. While these movements are predominately local, some larger movements have been recorded. For example, one individual was recorded in East Point, Darwin, 270 kilometres (170 mi) north of its previously documented range, following major Eucalyptus flowering events.

== Ecology ==
=== Diet and behaviour ===
The grey-headed honeyeater gleans and probes for invertebrates on the foliage and branches of vegetation, but will also take insects on the wing. Like many honeyeaters, the species will also consume nectar from flowering trees, particularly hakeas, eucalypts, grevilleas, mallee, and it has been known to take occasional fruit.

The grey-headed honeyeater is usually seen individually or in pairs; however, small parties of 5 to 20 have been recorded congregating around a food source. The species is active, vocal, inquisitive, and pugnacious. Intraspecific and interspecific aggression and agonistic behaviour, including territorial calls, bill-snapping, chasing, and fighting have been recorded during feeding and possibly breeding.

=== Breeding ===
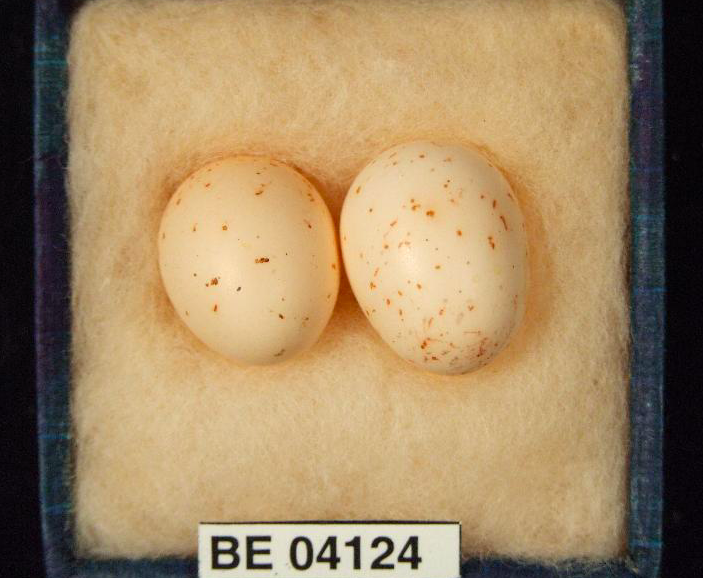
Grey-headed honeyeater eggs

The breeding ecology of the grey-headed honeyeater is poorly understood. Breeding is thought to mainly occur during winter and spring; however, it may occur at any time across the species range, possibly following rainfall. Nests are constructed low in a live tree or shrub, within a dry creek bed or bank, but usually not near water. The nest is a small, open, compact, cup-shaped structure made from dried plant stems, grass and bark bound by spider webs. The nest is lined with plant down, feathers, and animal hair, and suspended from the tree or shrub. Clutch size is thought to be two eggs variously described as oval, lengthened, rounded, glossy, lustreless, white, pink, sometimes unmarked or with light brown or purple spots. The incubation period is unknown, and it is thought that only a single brood is raised annually. Both sexes have been recorded performing distraction displays, when nests are approached.

== Conservation status, threats and conservation actions ==
=== Conservation status ===
Because the population is considered stable, and due to its extensive range, the grey-headed honeyeater is listed as Least Concern under the IUCN Red List of Threatened Species. The species is also considered Least Concern under Australian state and Commonwealth law.

=== Threats ===
While the population is considered stable, its actual size has not been quantified. The species is regarded as uncommon or locally common in some areas, suggesting it may occur at low densities. Nest predation and nest parasitism events have been recorded; however, insufficient information is available to determine whether these are significant threats.

The grey-headed honeyeater is considered threatened by climate change. Its diet and potential reliance on rainfall to breed likely leaves it vulnerable to changed climatic conditions, and the species may experience habitat contractions or loss of habitat suitability, due to climate change.

=== Conservation actions ===
The IUCN does not identify any conservation actions for the species. However, the Climate Change Adaptation Strategies for Australian Birds lists general measures which may inadvertently benefit the species. These include improved land management, purchasing land for protection, establishing new habitat and maintenance and improvement of existing habitat quality. Additionally, the range of the grey-headed honeyeater overlaps several Australian Wildlife Conservancy refuges, notably Newhaven, Bowra and Pungalina, and several National Parks. Management actions in these areas may also inadvertently benefit the species.

== Gallery ==
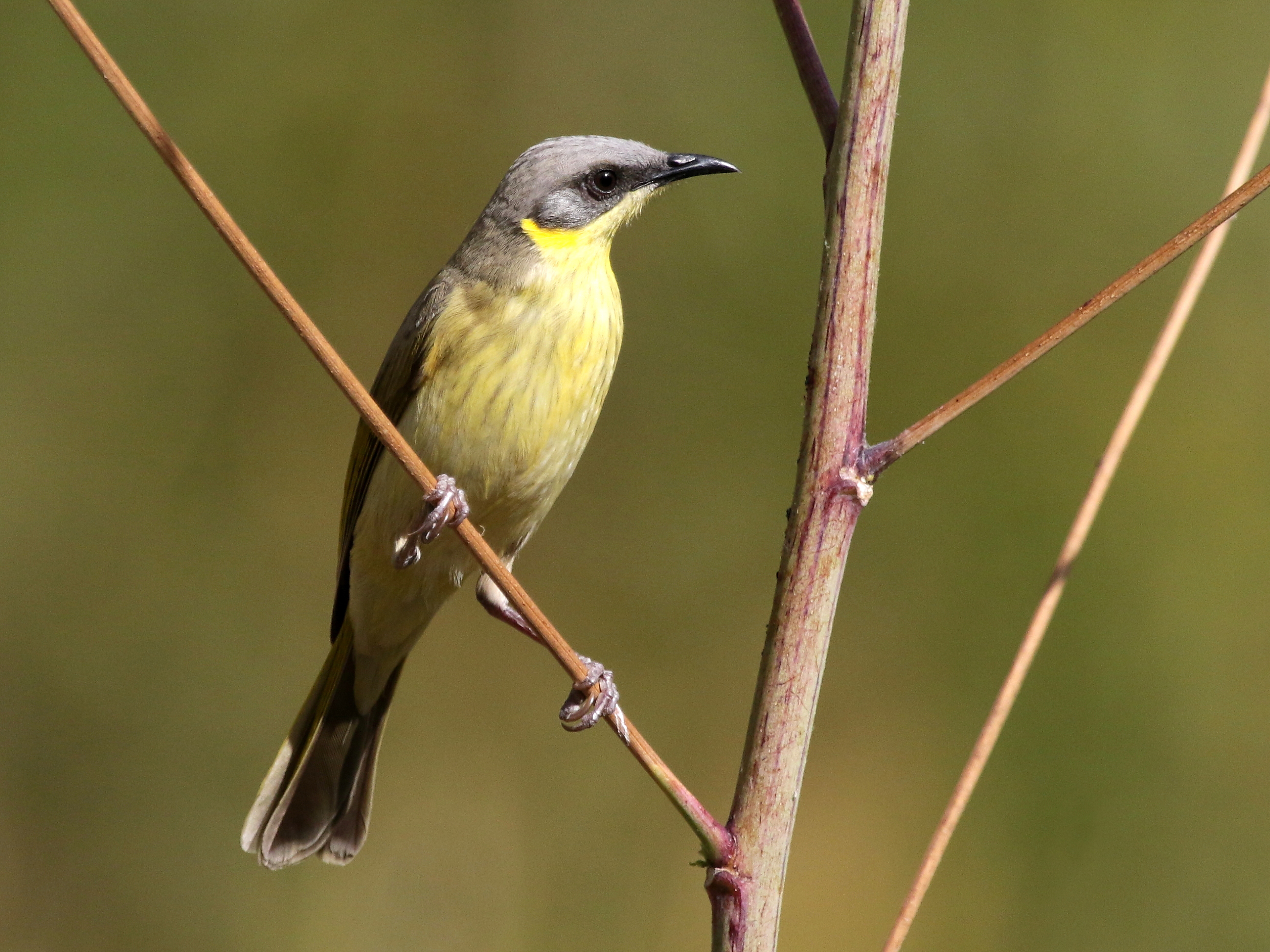
Near Lake Corella, western Queensland

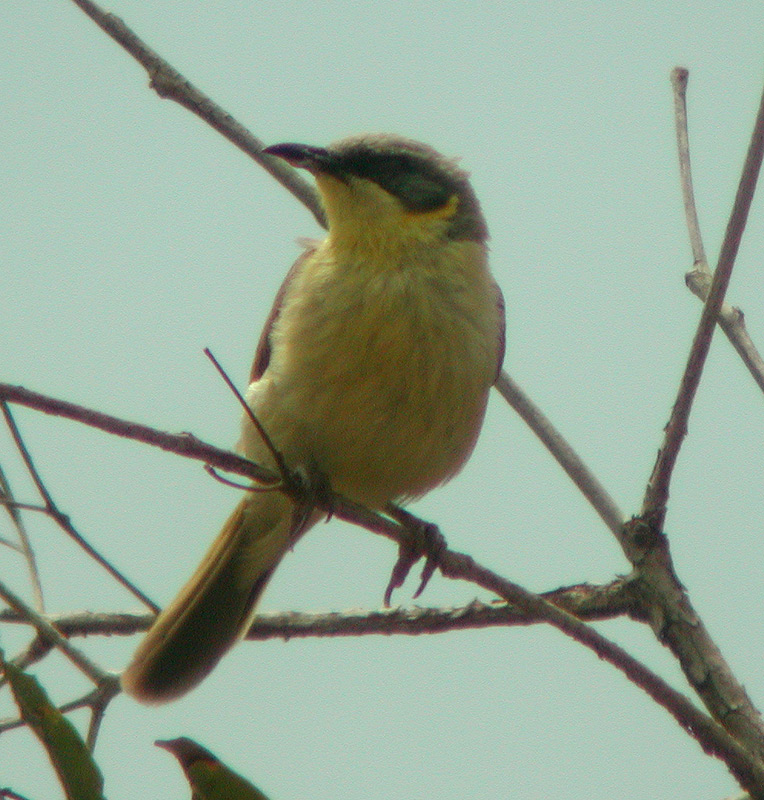
At Newhaven, Northern Territory

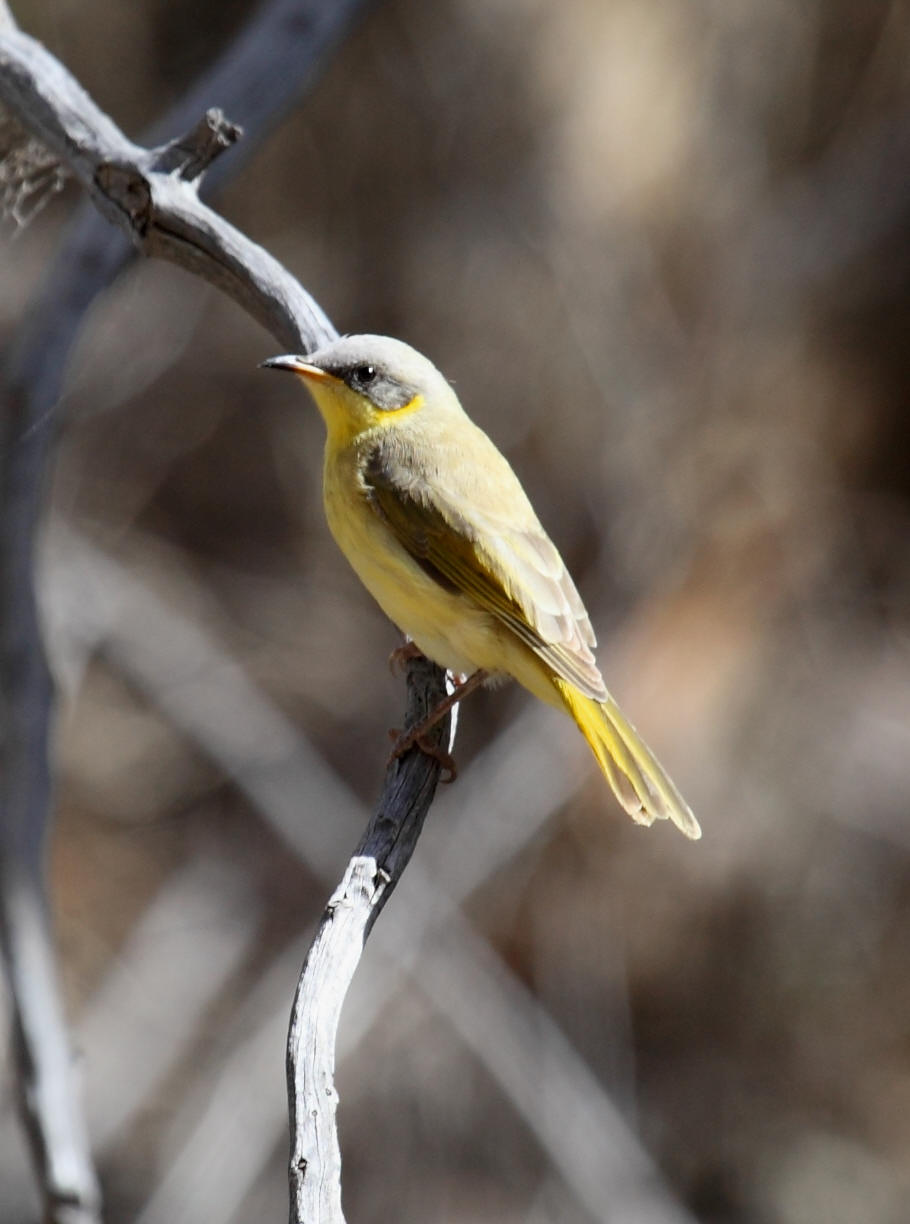
A juvenile showing the orange-brown base to bill
