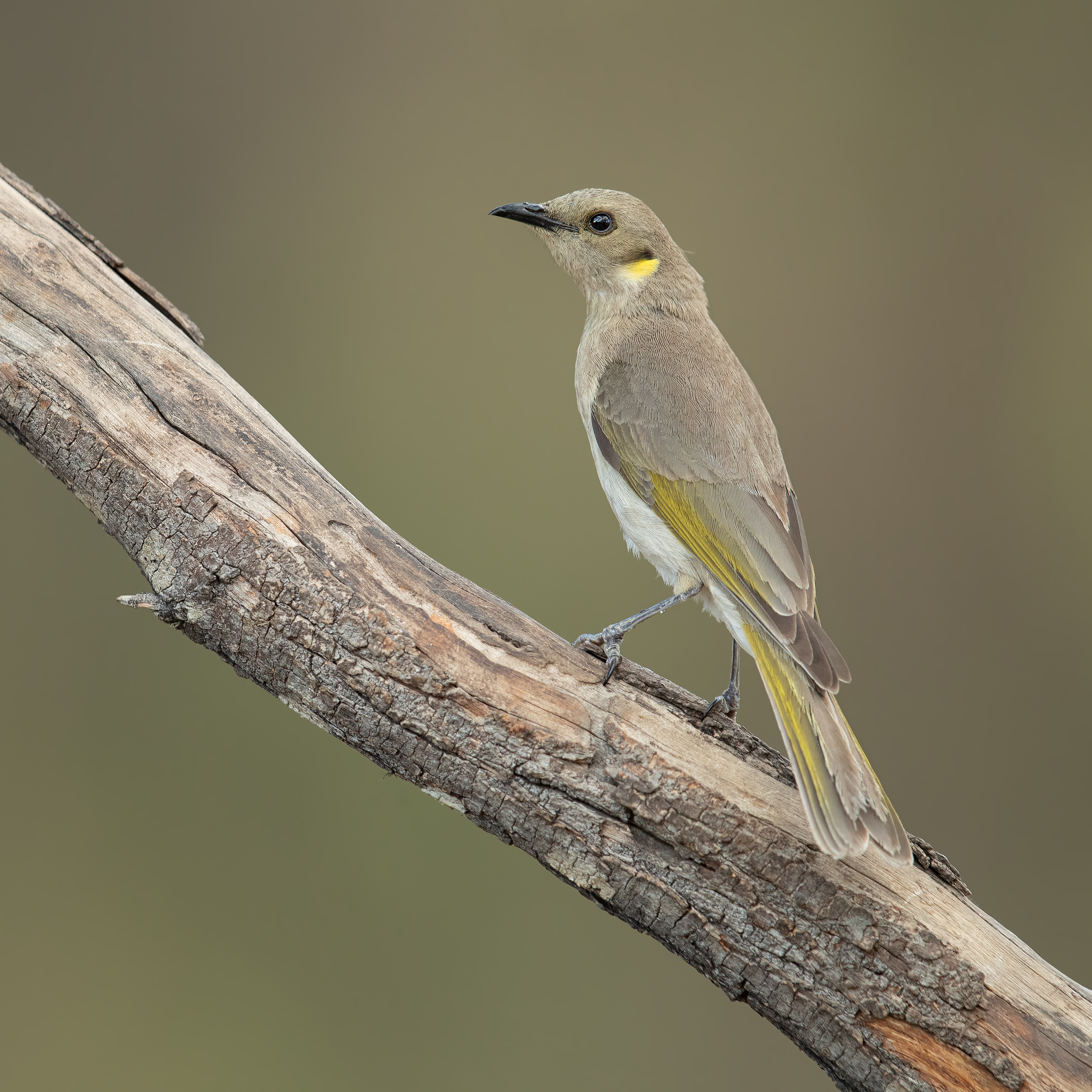

Conservation status
- Least Concern (IUCN 3.1)

Scientific classification
- Kingdom: Animalia
- Phylum: Chordata
- Class: Aves
- Order: Passeriformes
- Family: Meliphagidae
- Genus: Ptilotula
- Species: P. fusca

Binomial name
- Ptilotula fusca (Gould, 1837)

Synonyms
- Lichenostomus fuscus

= Fuscous honeyeater =

Species of bird

The fuscous honeyeater (Ptilotula fusca) is a species of bird in the family Meliphagidae. It is endemic to eastern Australia, where it inhabits subtropical and tropical dry forests.

The fuscous honeyeater was previously placed in the genus Lichenostomus, but was moved to Ptilotula after a molecular phylogenetic analysis, published in 2011, showed that the original genus was polyphyletic.

== Description ==
The fuscous honeyeater is dull grey-brown to olive-brown above with buffy-grey underparts. The bill is black and the eye-ring dark. It has a small black and yellow plume formed by the rear edge of the ear coverts.

Similar species include grey-fronted honeyeater, yellow-plumed honeyeater and white-plumed honeyeater.

=== Call ===
They have numerous calls, notably a distinctive rollicking arig arig a taw taw, a clear flutey cheer tor cheer and an incessant chip contact call.

== Ecology and behaviour ==
Fuscous honeyeaters live in colonies in dry eucalypt forest and woodland, mostly inland of the Great Dividing Range, but in New South Wales and Queensland also in coastal heathy forest. They are sometimes also found in gardens, and in patches of remnant forest on farms.

They are mostly sedentary, though will make some nomadic movements in response to drought and flowering of eucalypts. In the southeast of their range, they make some seasonal altitudinal movements, moving down from higher regions in during colder months.

=== Diet ===
Fuscous honeyeaters are mainly insectivorous, foraging actively mainly in outer and upper foliage, branches and trunks of eucalypts, and taking insects on the wing. They also feed opportunistically on nectar, including from eucalypts and mistletoes, lerp and honeydew.

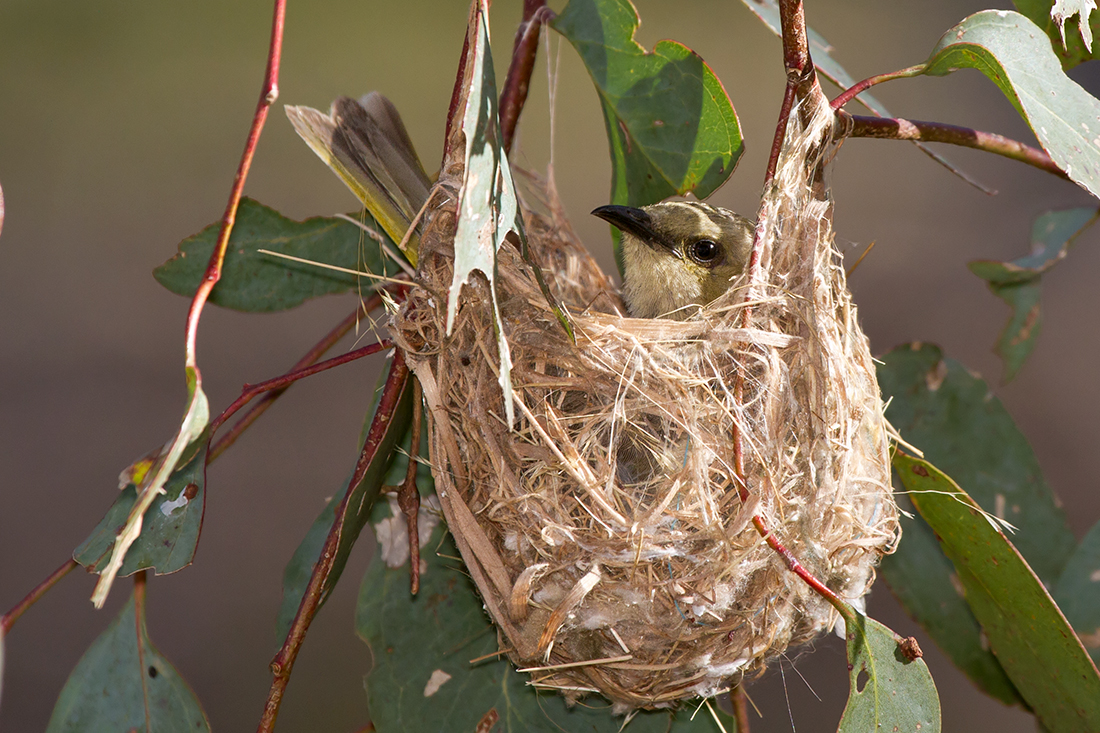
Fuscous honeyeater nest

== Conservation status ==
The species is listed under the IUCN Red List of Threatened Species as a species of Least Concern.
