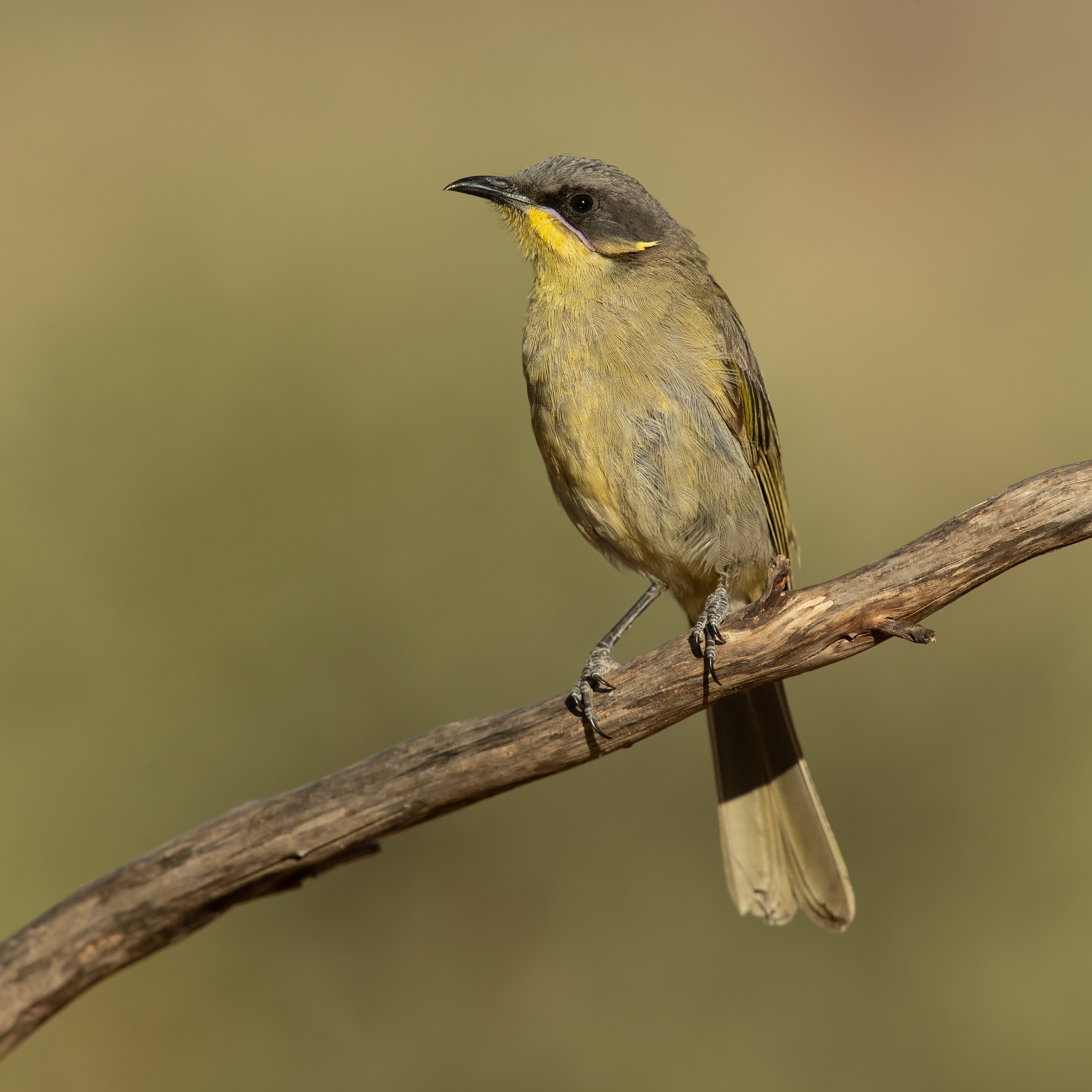

Conservation status
- Least Concern (IUCN 3.1)

Scientific classification
- Kingdom: Animalia
- Phylum: Chordata
- Class: Aves
- Order: Passeriformes
- Family: Meliphagidae
- Genus: Lichenostomus
- Species: L. cratitius

Binomial name
- Lichenostomus cratitius (Gould, 1841)

Subspecies
- L. c. occidentalis L. c. cratitius
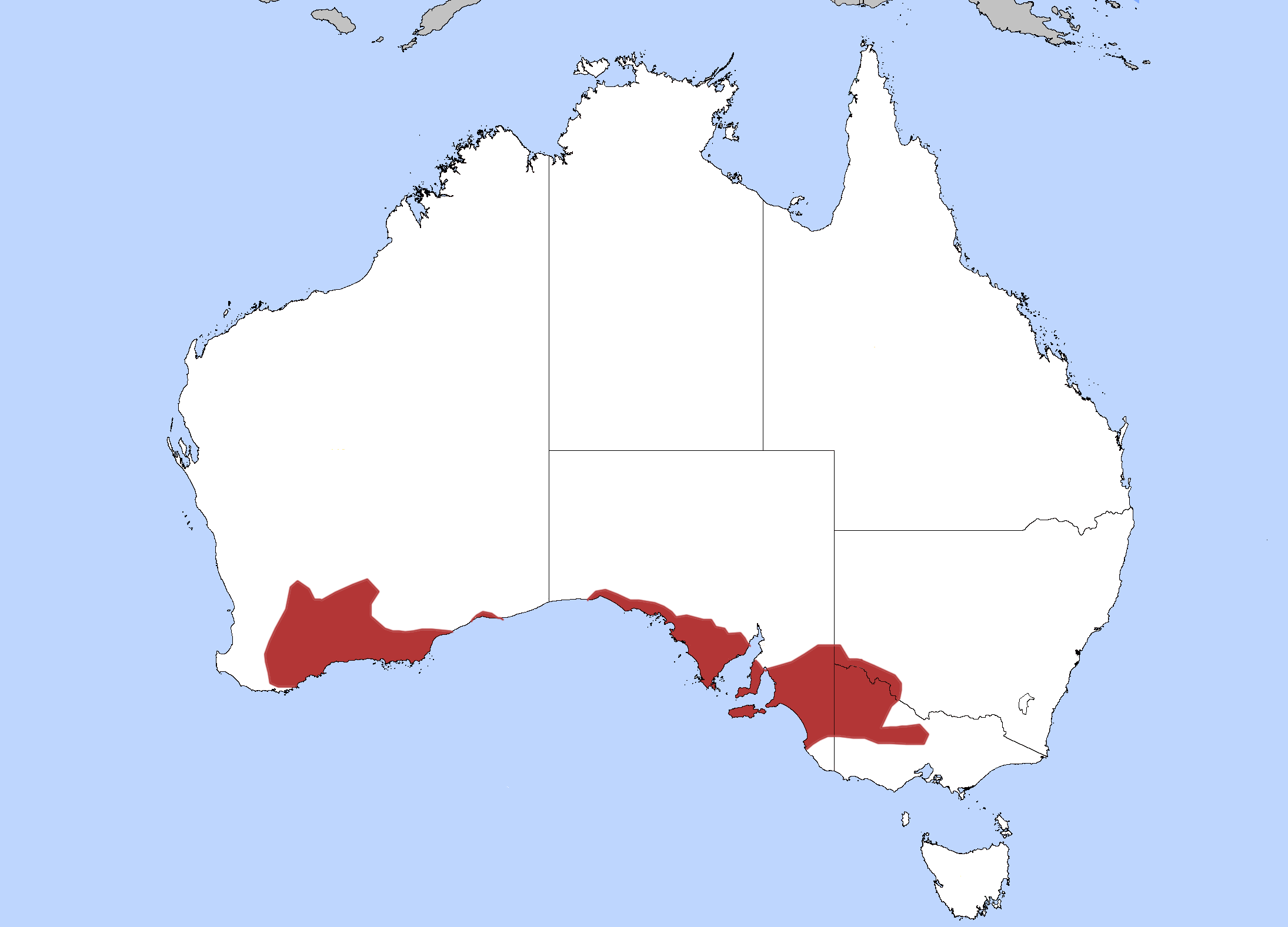
- Distribution of the purple-gaped honeyeater

= Purple-gaped honeyeater =

Species of bird

The purple-gaped honeyeater (Lichenostomus cratitius) is a species of bird in the family Meliphagidae. It is endemic to semi-arid southern Australia, where it inhabits mallee, tall heath and associated low eucalypt woodland.

== Description ==
The purple-gaped honeyeater is a medium-sized (16-19 centimetres) honeyeater which is generally grey-olive above and buffish yellow below. They have a patterned head, with a black eyestripe against a grey background and purple gape above a yellow streak on the throat and pointed yellow ear coverts. Juveniles are similar, but with duller facial patterns, slightly browner plumage, and a yellow gape and gape line. The Kangaroo Island subspecies is considered to be larger and darker than the mainland subspecies.

Similar species include yellow-plumed honeyeater and singing honeyeater. The bird is also named Wattle-Cheeked Honeyeater in Birds of Australia vol 11 by Gregory Mathews

=== Call ===
The song is a clear toweet-toweet-toweet, followed by a high-pitched yep-yep-yep, often performed from a tall branch, including before dawn.

== Distribution ==
They occur in disjunct populations across southern Australia, east from southern Western Australia, with the eastern population largely occurring south of the Murray River, and NSW forming the extreme north-east of its range. Despite its naturally disjunct populations, the purple-gaped honeyeater has very low genetic diversity across its range.

== Ecology and behaviour ==
The main habitat type for purple-gaped honeyeater is mallee woodland and shrubland. This includes bull mallee, with patches of green mallee or blue mallee. They also occur in yellow gum woodland with dense thickets of 'totem-poles' or violet honey-myrtle on low-lying flats and gullies in mallee areas. They are occasionally recorded in river red gums bordering waterways, and seasonally in red ironbark woodlands when they are in flower. Purple-gaped honeyeaters can also occasionally be found in gardens.

They are gregarious, usually seen in pairs, or groups of 3-8 birds. Generally considered quiet and unobtrusive, except in spring when they may call often. They are known to regularly drink and bathe, particularly in warmer weather. Purple-gaped honeyeaters associate with yellow-plumed honeyeater and tawny-crowned honeyeater, but can be aggressive towards other honeyeaters, and frequently chase other birds, particularly when feeding.

=== Diet ===
Purple-gaped honeyeaters feed mainly on nectar and insects, especially from flowering mallee eucalypts, and banksias. They also forage for insects under loose bark on trunks and branches of trees, or catch flying insects on the wing. Seeds, pollen and honeydew from scale insects are less frequently consumed.

=== Reproduction ===
Purple-gaped honeyeaters build nests as a small cup of bark strips, grass and down, bound with spider web and egg sacs, slung in a horizontal fork or from slender branchlets within dense foliage (usually broombush or eucalypts), normally less than three metres above the ground.

== Threats ==
The purple-gaped honeyeater is vulnerable to clearing of mallee, which destroys habitat by removing food plants and nesting sites.

== Conservation actions ==
=== Conservation status ===
- Internationally

* The species is listed under the IUCN Red List of Threatened Species as a species of 'Least concern'.

- Australia

* In NSW, it is listed as Vulnerable under the Biodiversity Conservation Act 2016.
* In South Australia, the species is listed as Rare under the National Parks and Wildlife Act 1972.
* In Victoria, the species is listed as Vulnerable under the Flora and Fauna Guarantee Act 1988.

=== Protected areas ===
Purple-gaped honeyeaters occur in several protected areas, including:

- New South Wales

* Mallee Cliffs National Park

- South Australia

* Flinders Chase National Park
* Gawler Ranges National Park
* Billiatt Conservation Park
* Peebinga Conservation Park
* Gluepot Reserve

- Victoria

* Greater Bendigo National Park
* Hattah-Kulkyne National Park
* Little Desert National Park
* Murray-Sunset National Park
* Wyperfeld National Park
* Big Desert Wilderness Park
* Lake Albacutya Park
* Inglewood Nature Conservation Reserve
* Wychitella Nature Conservation Reserve

- Western Australia

* Cape Arid National Park
* Cape Le Grand National Park
