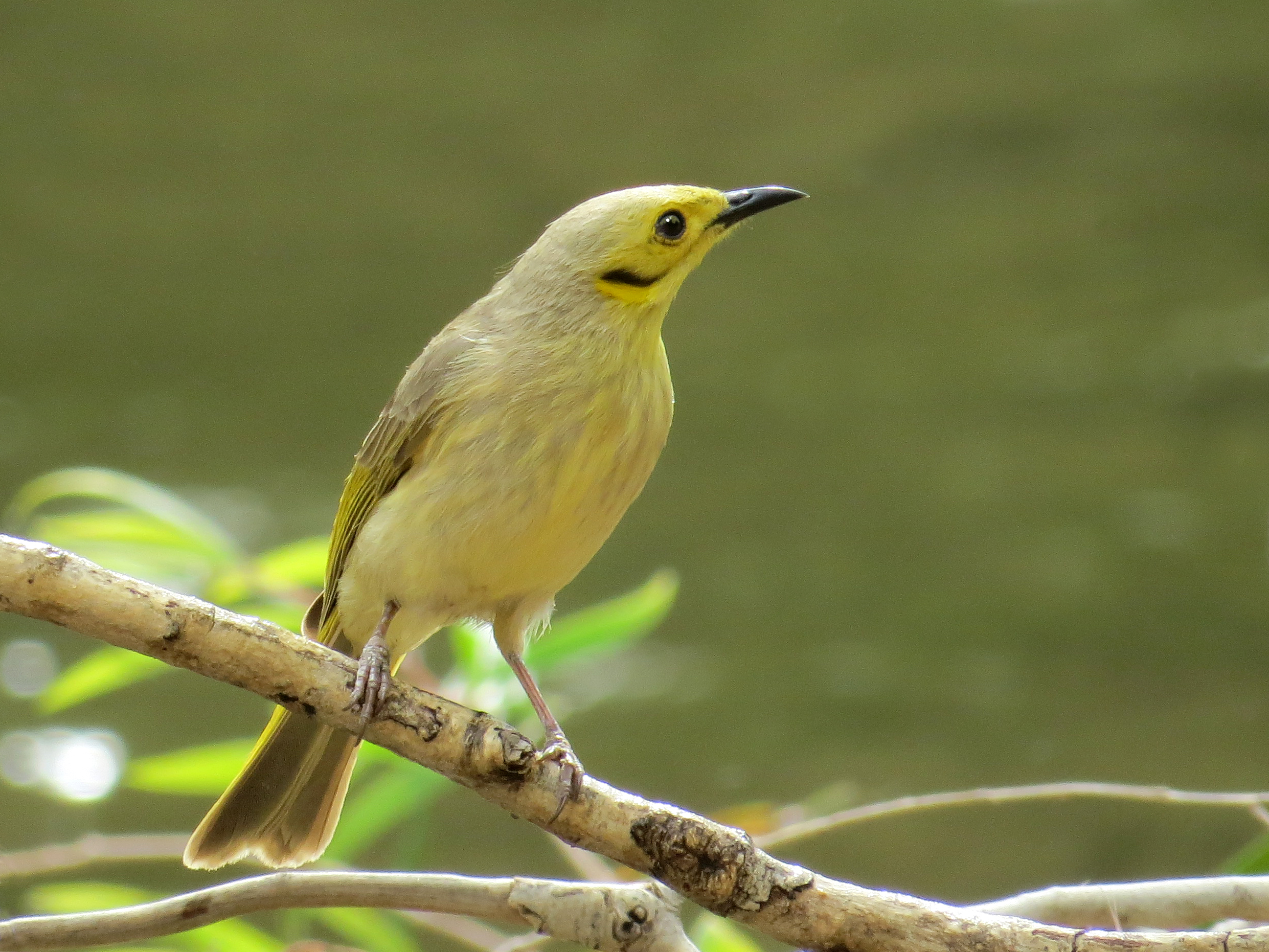
- Yellow-tinted honeyeater (Ptilotula flavescens)

Scientific classification
- Kingdom: Animalia
- Phylum: Chordata
- Class: Aves
- Order: Passeriformes
- Family: Meliphagidae
- Genus: Ptilotula; Mathews, 1912

Type species
- Ptilotis flavescens Gould, 1840

= Ptilotula =

Genus of birds

Ptilotula is a genus of honeyeater consisting of species occurring in Australia and Papua New Guinea. The genus consists of six former members of Lichenostomus, and was created after a molecular analysis showed the genus was polyphyletic. The International Ornithologists' Union accepted this change and officially included the genus in reference lists from 2013. The type species is the yellow-tinted honeyeater (Ptilotula flavescens). Birds in this genus typically occupy dry open forest and woodland habitats, and can be found in arid and semi-arid environments.

== Species ==
The genus includes six species:

| Image | Name | Common name |
|---|---|---|
| | Ptilotula flavescens | Yellow-tinted honeyeater |
| | Ptilotula keartlandi | Grey-headed honeyeater |
| | Ptilotula ornata | Yellow-plumed honeyeater |
| | Ptilotula plumula | Grey-fronted honeyeater |
| | Ptilotula fusca | Fuscous honeyeater |
| | Ptilotula penicillata | White-plumed honeyeater |

== Description ==
Ptilotula species are medium-sized honeyeaters ranging from 13 cm to 18.5 cm in size, with the yellow-tinted honeyeater (P. flavescens) smallest at 13–15.5 cm and the yellow-plumed honeyeater (P. ornatus) largest at 14–18.5 cm. The characteristic features all species share are a plain face with a black proximal stripe and either yellow or white distal plumes across the sides of the neck.

== Systematics and Taxonomy ==
Until recently, the members of Ptilotula were considered part of Lichenostomus. They were recognised as a clade within this genus, displaying similarities in morphological characters and habitat preferences. Extensive molecular phylogenetic analyses of the honeyeater family Meliphagidae occurred during the first decade of the 21st century, resulting in Lichenostomus being split into seven genera.

The name Ptilotula was first proposed by the Australian ornithologist Gregory Mathews in 1912. Prior to 1912 most honeyeaters were placed in either Meliphaga or Melithreptus. He attempted to resolve this by placing 14 species into Ptilotis, a genus originally described by John Gould; but Mathews recognised his treatment was polyphyletic. He rectified this by creating several new genera from Ptilotis, placing the white-plumed honeyeater (P. penicillatus) and the yellow-tinted honeyeater (P. flavescens) in Ptilotula. However, when contributing to the Second Official Checklist of the Birds of Australia, the Royal Australasian Ornithologists Union rejected Mathews' phylogenic treatment as they did not agree with the formation of so many new genera. Mathews compromised by allowing these species to remain in Meliphaga and noting Ptilotula as a sub-genus.

In subsequent works, Mathews continued to list Ptilotula as a genus rather than sub-genus. In addition to the two species listed above, he included the grey-headed honeyeater (P. keartlandi), the yellow-plumed honeyeater (P. ornatus) and the grey-fronted honeyeater (P. plumulus) in the genus. Nevertheless, other authors continued to follow the RAOU standard using Meliphaga for all these species.

In 1975 the Australian ornithologist Richard Schodde argued that the criteria used to determine membership in Meliphaga was too broad and that if applied consistently, more than half of the family would be placed in this genus. He split Meliphaga into three genera, placing the Ptilotula clade in Lichenostomus. The development of molecular analyses resulted in later research which agreed with Schodde's assessment, but while identifying Ptilotula as a clade early techniques were unable to give sufficient weight to warrant a split from Lichenostomus. By 2010 newer techniques clearly showed that Lichenostomus was polyphyletic and needed to be reviewed.

In 2011, Nyari and Joseph were finally able to show that the Ptilotula clade warranted promotion to genus. Their assessment confirmed the evolutionary relationship Mathews had proposed in 1931, albeit with the inclusion of the fuscous honeyeater (P. fuscus) which he had placed in the monotypic genus Paraptilotis. They also showed that three other Lichenostomus species, varied honeyeater (Gavicalis versicolor), singing honeyeater (G. virescens) and mangrove honeyeater (G. fasciogularis) could also be placed in Ptilotula due to being closely related. These three species are much larger (16–24 cm) and all share a black band from the bill through the eye to the neck, a character absent in the Ptilotula complex. For this reason, they decided not to include them in Ptilotula and instead placed them in their own genus Gavicalis.

== Evolutionary history ==
Ptilotula are derived from an unknown ancestor which occupied dry woodland in central Australia. Walter Boles described a fossil leg bone found in Riversleigh, Queensland from an as yet unnamed Pliocene species as characteristic of tibias from the Lichenostomus-Meliphaga complex. It is most similar in size to those of P.keartlandi and P.plumulus, two species which are resident in the region and closely related sister species. The environment has been dry woodland since the late Miocene to early Pliocene hence the similarities to extant species indicate this fossil may represent an ancestor to these species.
