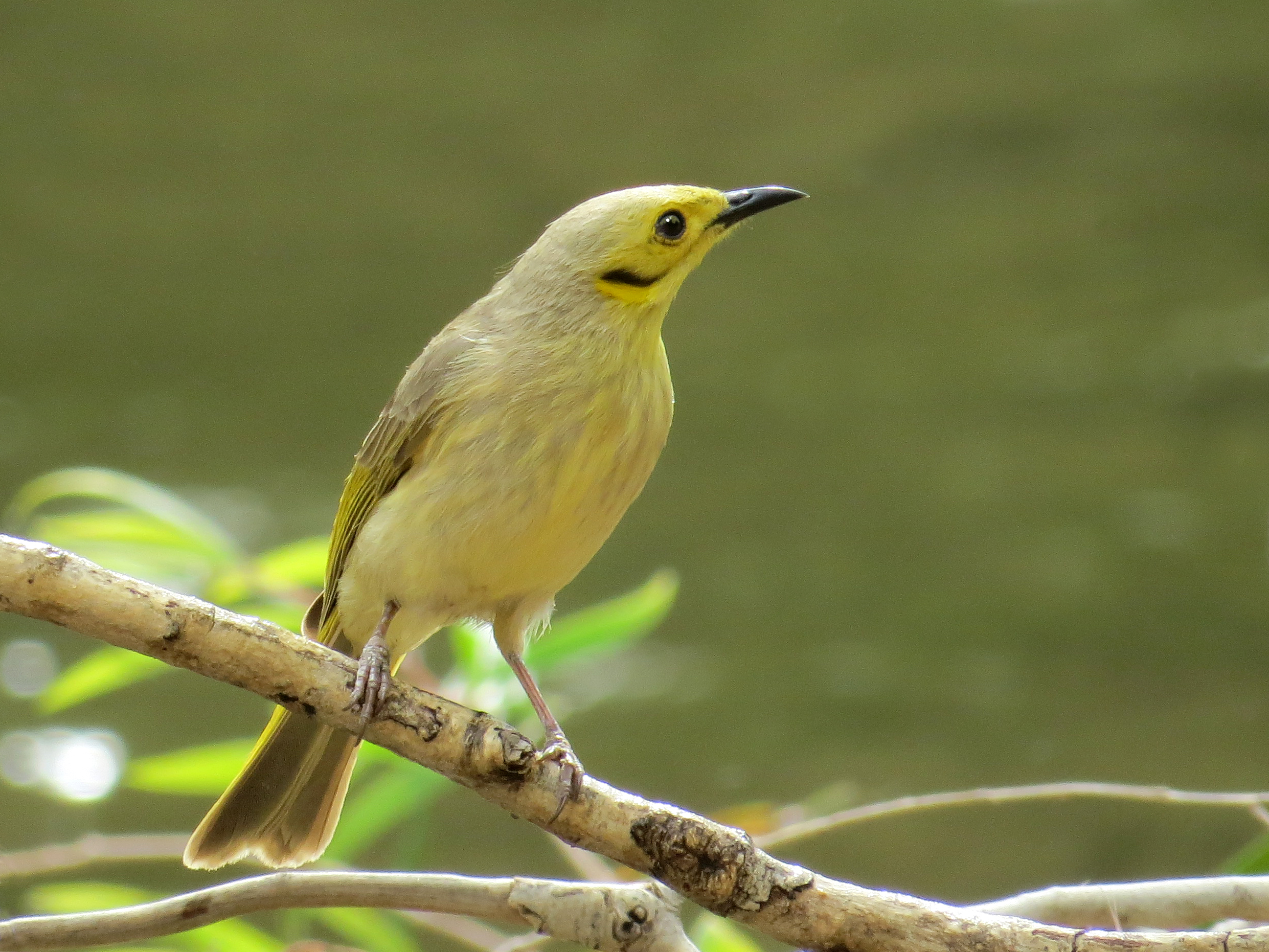

Conservation status
- Least Concern (IUCN 3.1)

Scientific classification
- Kingdom: Animalia
- Phylum: Chordata
- Class: Aves
- Order: Passeriformes
- Family: Meliphagidae
- Genus: Ptilotula
- Species: P. flavescens

Binomial name
- Ptilotula flavescens (Gould, 1840)

Synonyms
- Lichenostomus flavescens

= Yellow-tinted honeyeater =

Species of bird

The yellow-tinted honeyeater (Ptilotula flavescens) is a species of bird in the family Meliphagidae. It is found in northern Australia (Western Australia, Northern Territory, and Queensland) and Papua New Guinea. Its natural habitats are subtropical or tropical moist lowland forests and subtropical or tropical mangrove forests.

The yellow-tinted honeyeater was previously included in the genus Lichenostomus, but was moved to Ptilotula after a molecular phylogenetic analysis, published in 2011, showed that the original genus was polyphyletic.

== Gallery ==
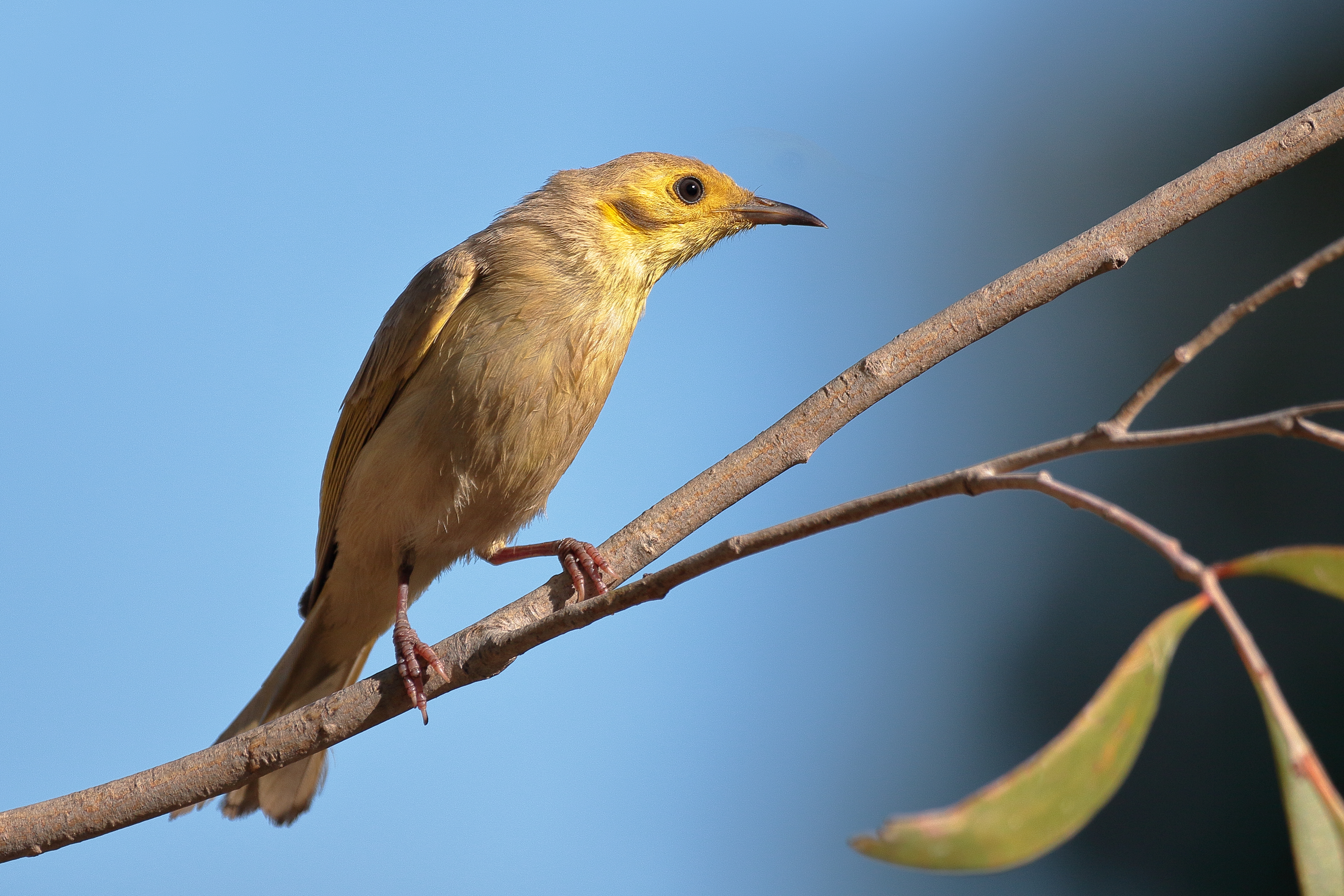
Ptilotula flavescens, Gregory River, Queensland
