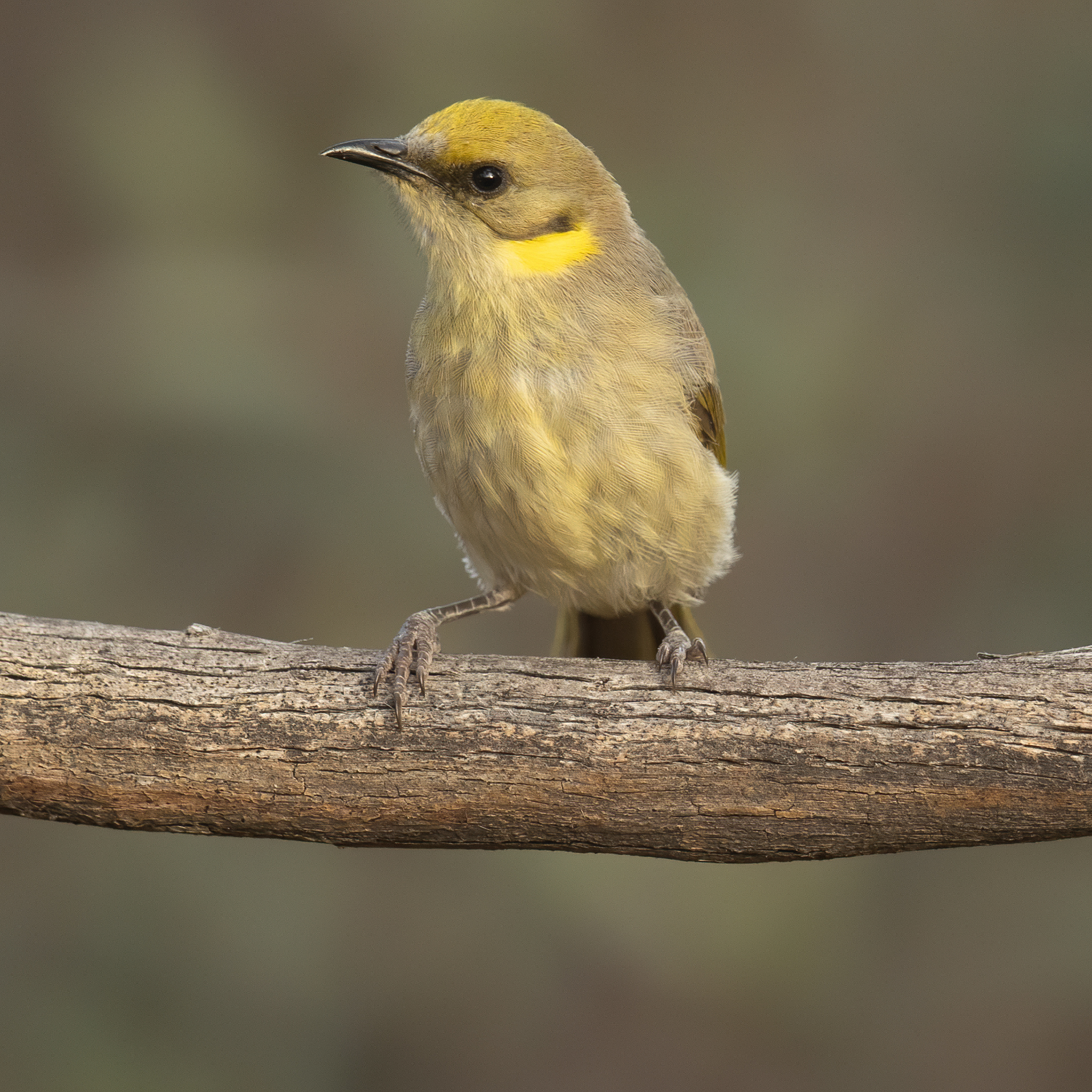
- Yathong Nature Reserve, NSW

Conservation status
- Least Concern (IUCN 3.1)

Scientific classification
- Kingdom: Animalia
- Phylum: Chordata
- Class: Aves
- Order: Passeriformes
- Family: Meliphagidae
- Genus: Ptilotula
- Species: P. plumula

Binomial name
- Ptilotula plumula (Gould, 1841)

Synonyms
- Lichenostomus plumulus Gould, 1841

= Grey-fronted honeyeater =

Species of bird

The grey-fronted honeyeater (Ptilotula plumula) is a species of bird in the family Meliphagidae. It is endemic to Australia. Its natural habitat is Mediterranean-type shrubby vegetation. The grey-fronted honeyeater was originally described in 1841 by English ornithologist John Gould as Lichenostomus plumulus. It was moved to the genus Ptilotula after a molecular phylogenetic analysis, published in 2011, showed that Lichenostomus was polyphyletic.

== Description ==
The grey-fronted honeyeater is a small, plain honeyeater with a yellow neck plume bordered above by black. It has a small grey patch at the forehead, that may be obscure in northern subspecies. The crown is olive yellow and the lores blackish. The upper parts are olive grey and flight feathers yellow olive. Underparts are off white with indistinct stripes. The grey-fronted honeyeater can easily be confused with the yellow-tinted honeyeater as their ranges overlap and they are of similar size. Differences include the lores which are yellow grey and plumes that are narrower in the yellow-tinted honeyeater.

== Gallery ==
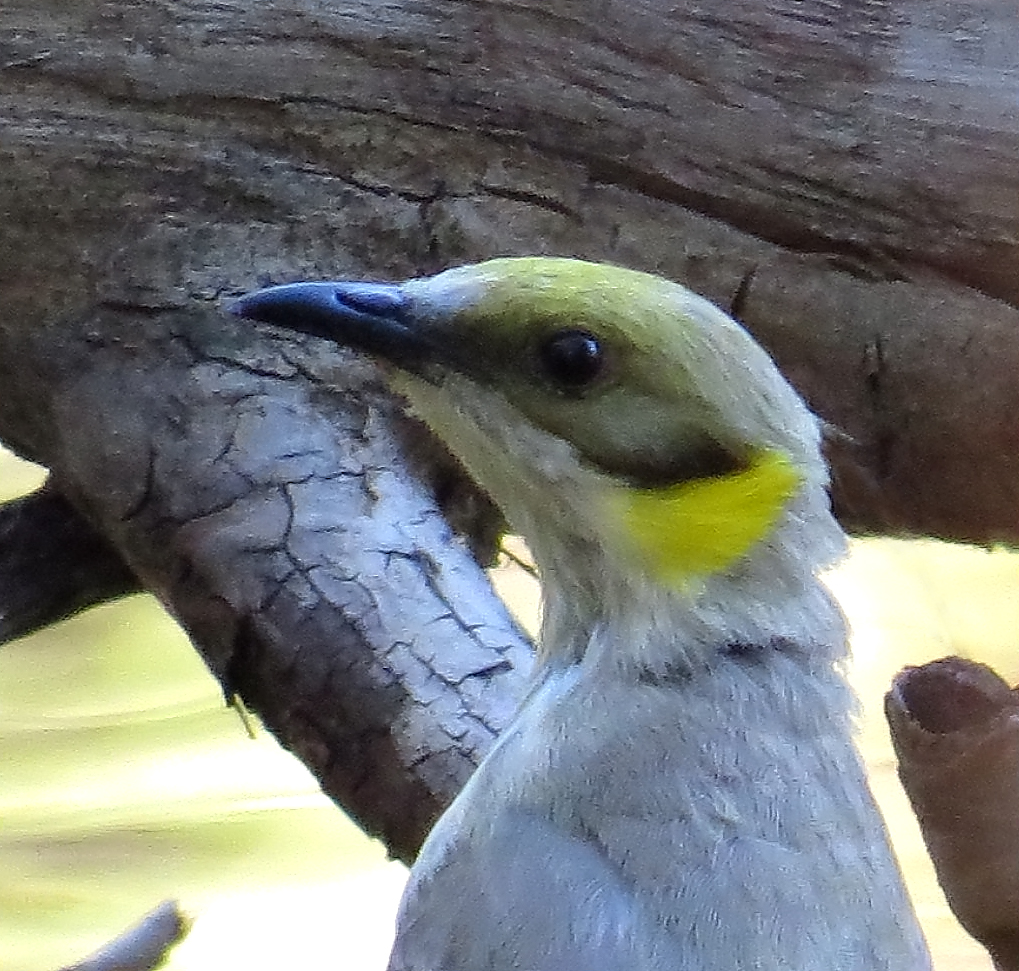
Closeup of head highlighting the small grey patch between the bill and forehead from which the bird gets its common name

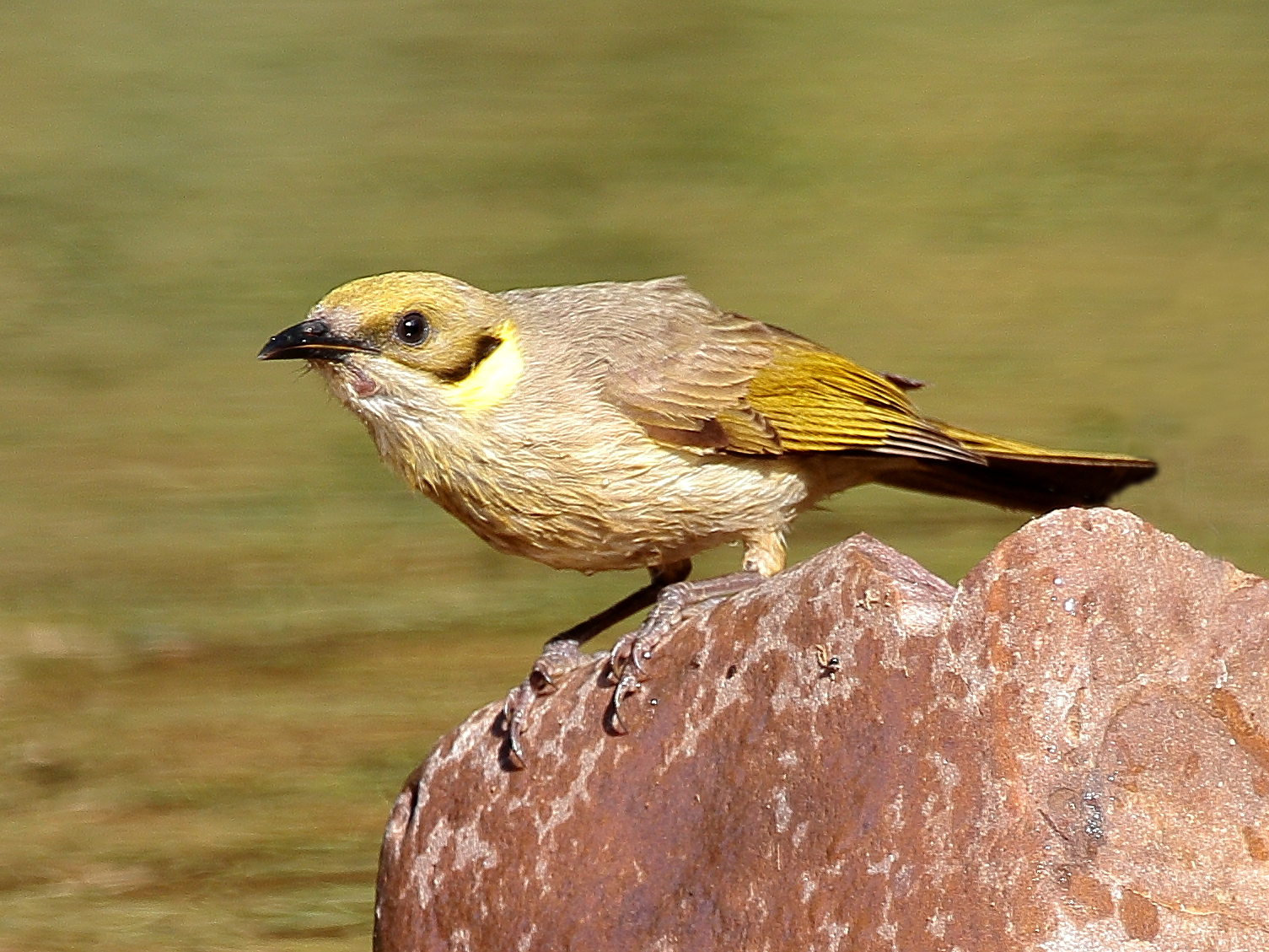
Gregory River, Queensland

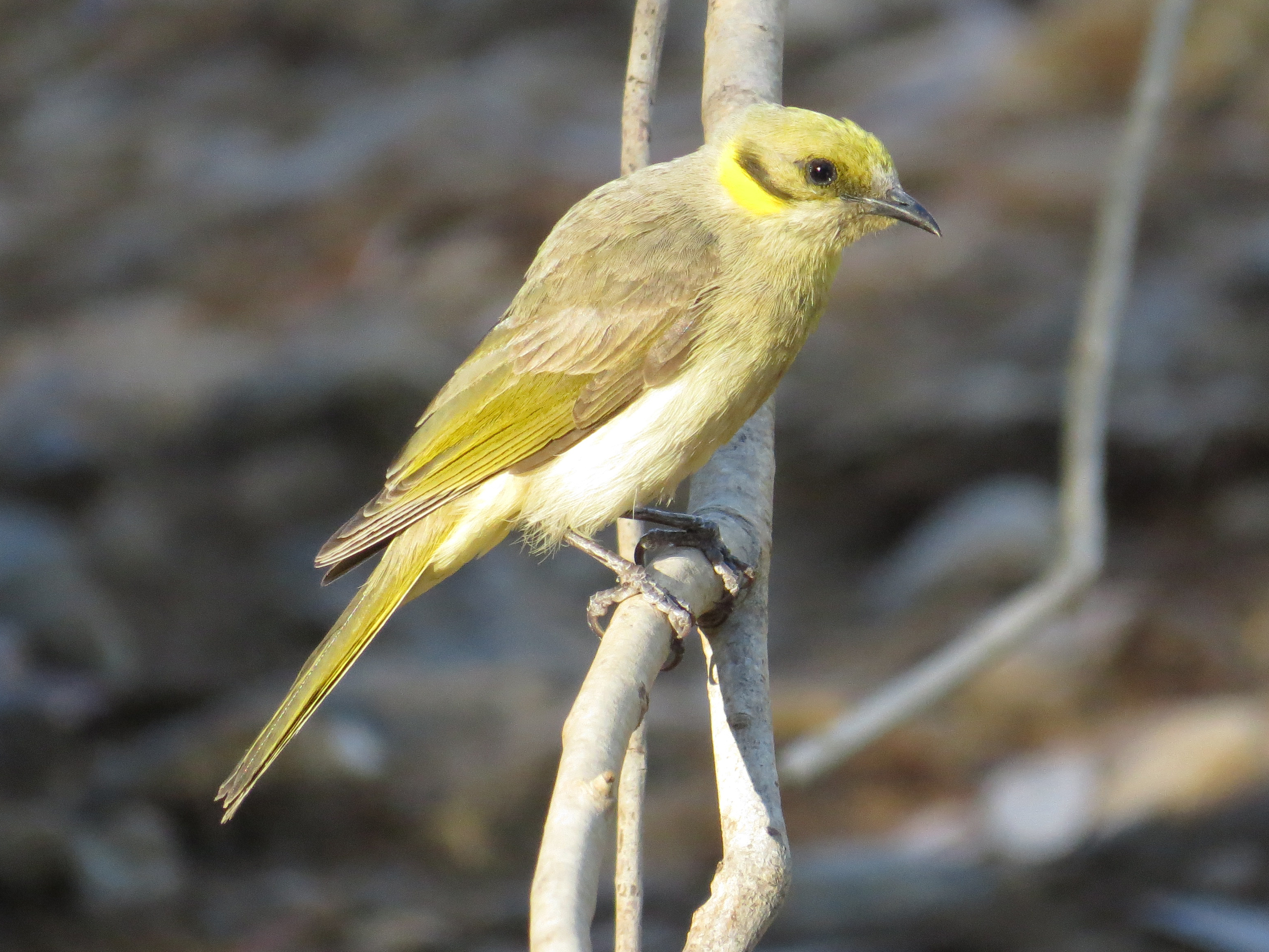
Gregory River, Queensland
