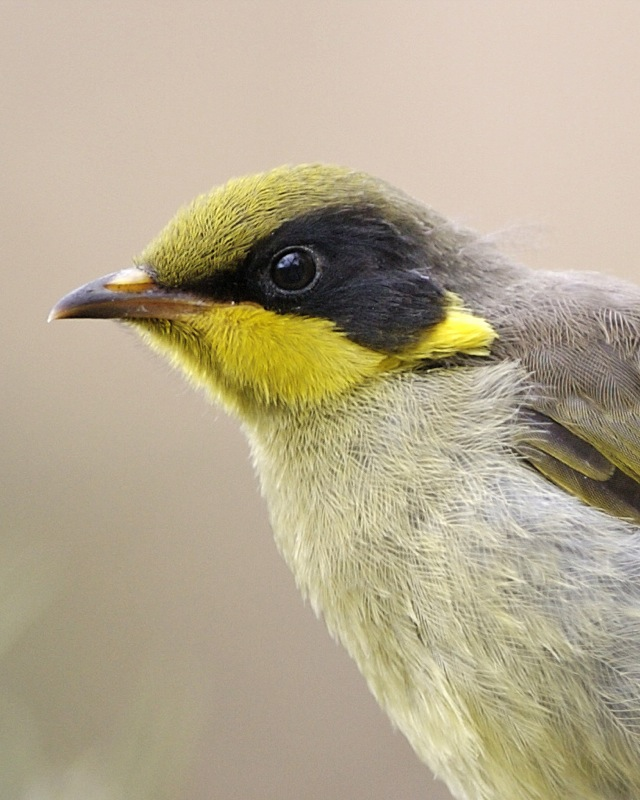
- Yellow-tufted honeyeater (Lichenostomus melanops)

Scientific classification
- Kingdom: Animalia
- Phylum: Chordata
- Class: Aves
- Order: Passeriformes
- Family: Meliphagidae
- Genus: Lichenostomus; Cabanis, 1851

Type species
- Lichenostomus occidentalis Cabanis, 1851

= Lichenostomus =

Genus of birds

Lichenostomus is a genus of honeyeaters endemic to Australia.

The genus formerly contained twenty species but it was split after a molecular phylogenetic analysis published in 2011 showed that the genus was polyphyletic. Former members were moved to the six new genera: Nesoptilotis, Bolemoreus, Caligavis, Stomiopera, Gavicalis and Ptilotula.

The genus contains two species:

Image	Scientific name	Common name	Distribution
	Lichenostomus melanops	Yellow-tufted honeyeater	east and southeast Australia
	Lichenostomus cratitius	Purple-gaped honeyeater	southwest and south-central Australia

The name Lichenostomus was introduced by the German ornithologist Jean Cabanis in 1851. The word is derived from the Greek leikhēn meaning lichen or callous and stoma meaning mouth.

== Feeding ==
Both species feed primarily on nectar but also glean insects from foliage and bark and make aerial sallies for invertebrates. The purple-gaped honeyeater can forage in small groups of up to 30 birds.
