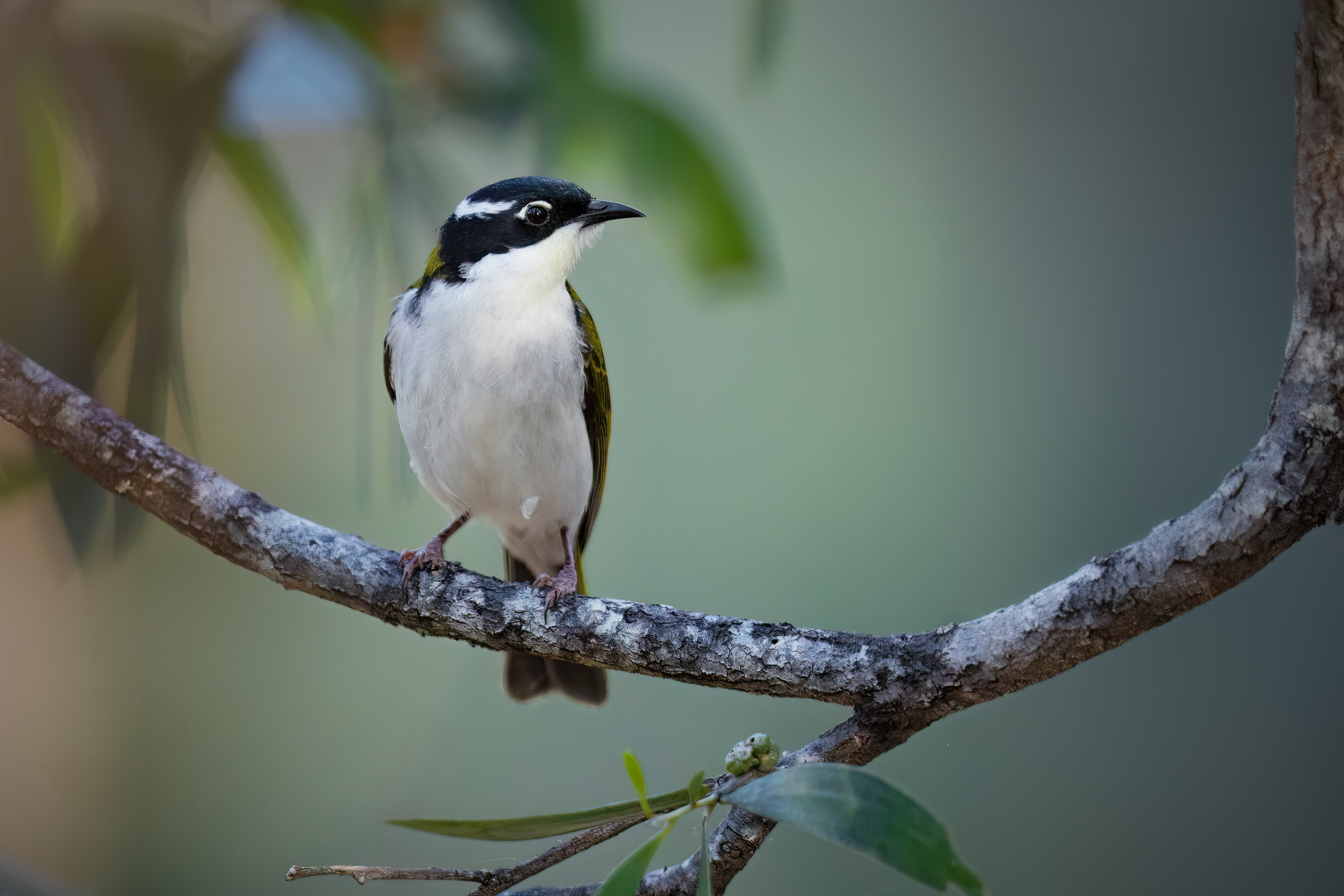

Conservation status
- Least Concern (IUCN 3.1)

Scientific classification
- Kingdom: Animalia
- Phylum: Chordata
- Class: Aves
- Order: Passeriformes
- Family: Meliphagidae
- Genus: Melithreptus
- Species: M. albogularis

Binomial name
- Melithreptus albogularis Gould, 1848

= White-throated honeyeater =

Species of bird

The white-throated honeyeater (Melithreptus albogularis) is a bird of the honeyeater family Meliphagidae native to New Guinea and eastern and northern Australia. It is 11.5 to 14.5 cm (4.5 to 5.7 in) long, olive-green above and white below, with a black head, a white or pale blue patch over the eye, and a white stripe across the nape.

== Taxonomy ==
John Gould described the white-throated honeyeater in 1848. Its species name comes from the Latin words albus 'white', and gula 'throat'."

English naturalist Charles Walter De Vis described Melithreptus vinitinctus from a specimen collected by K. Broadbent in the Kimberley in 1884. This was later synonymized with M. albogularis.

Traditionally, two subspecies have been recognised: subspecies albogularis from northwestern Australia, the Northern Territory and Cape York, and subspecies inopinatus from central and southeastern Queensland. However, genetic work published in 2010 surprisingly found that the Carpentarian Barrier (south of the Gulf of Carpentaria) fostered a split between lineages east and west of it in the Pliocene, between 2.4 and 5.2 million years ago, and that a more recent split took place between 1 and 2.8 million years ago in northeastern Queensland. It is this more recent split that corresponds with the ranges of the two subspecies.

The white-throated honeyeater is a member of the genus Melithreptus, with several species of similar size and (apart from the brown-headed honeyeater) black-headed appearance, in the honeyeater family Meliphagidae. Within the genus, it is classified in the subgenus Melithreptus, along with the white-naped, black-headed and Gilbert's honeyeater; these all forage for insects in foliage or canopy, rather than on bark or branches, congregate in larger flocks, and are found in more open, dry sclerophyll forests and savannah. They also have smaller feet and a less prominent or missing nuchal bar.

Subspecies inopinatus differs from subspecies albogularis by its larger size and duller olive back. Allen Keast noted that the forms followed Gloger's and Bergmann's rules.

Common names used for this species include white-chinned honeyeater, and (from the late 19th and early 20th century), the gay or gay-tinted honeyeater.

== Description ==
The adult white-throated honeyeater is 11.5 to 14.5 cm (4.5 to 5.7 in) long, with olive-green or yellow-green upperparts, yellower on the rump, and white throat and underparts, a black head, a blue-white patch of bare skin over the eye, and a white stripe across the nape. The bill is black, the eyes red-brown, and the legs purple-brown. Various calls have been recorded.

=== Similar species ===
Western Australian Gilbert's honeyeaters (Melithreptus chloropsis) also have a white eye-patch, and so can be difficult to distinguish, but there is no range overlap. Eastern white-naped honeyeaters (M. lunatus) have a red eye-patch.

== Breeding ==
Breeding throughout its range, the white-throated honeyeater breeds from July or August to December, or April in northwestern Australia, raising one or two broods a season. The nest is a sturdy cup-shaped structure made of bark and grasses in the fork of a tree. A clutch of two eggs measuring 18 by 14 mm (0.71 by 0.55 in) is laid, pinkish with brownish markings.

== Gallery ==
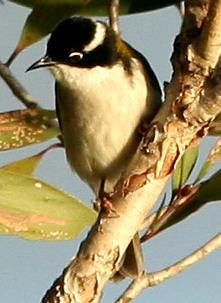

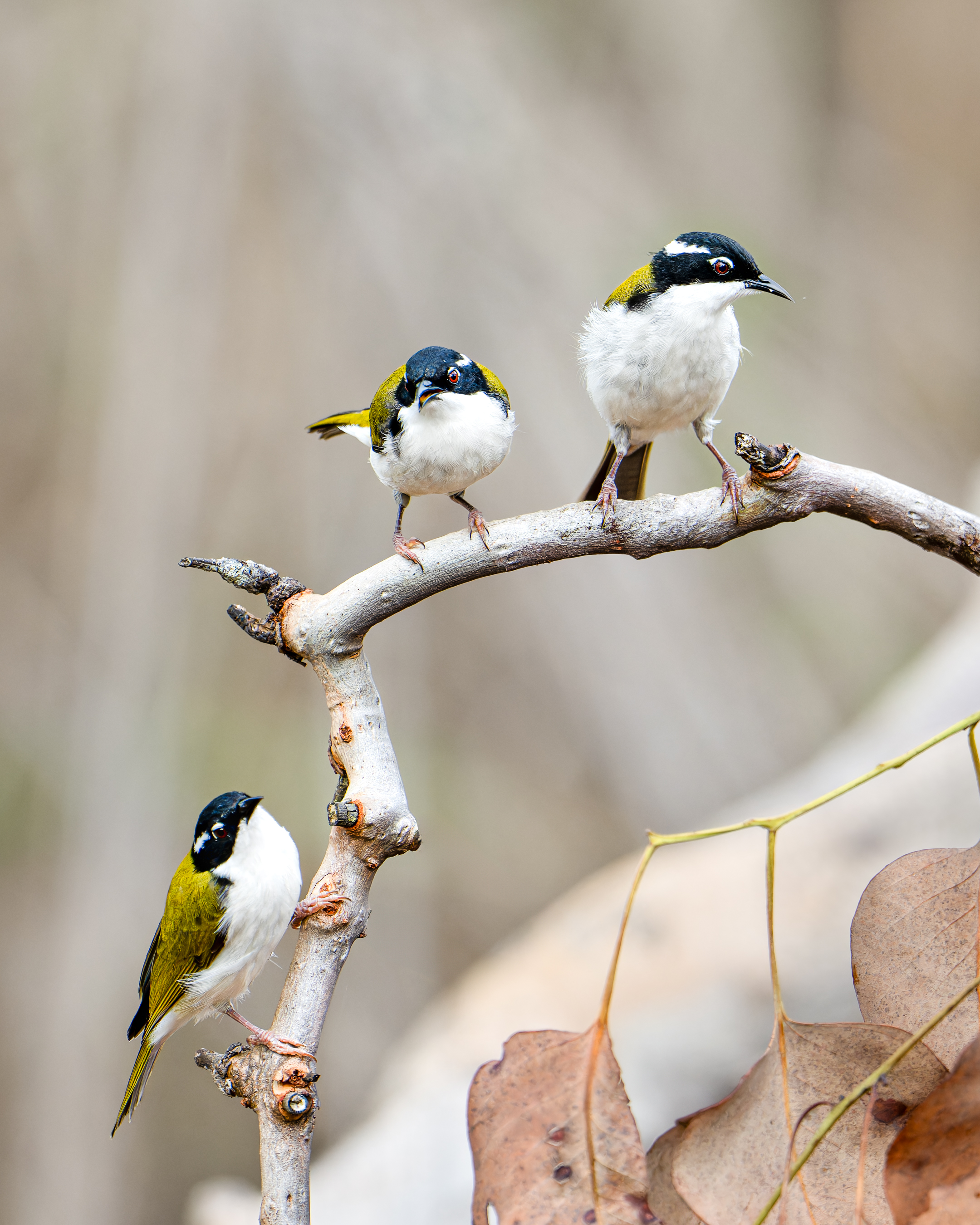
A trio

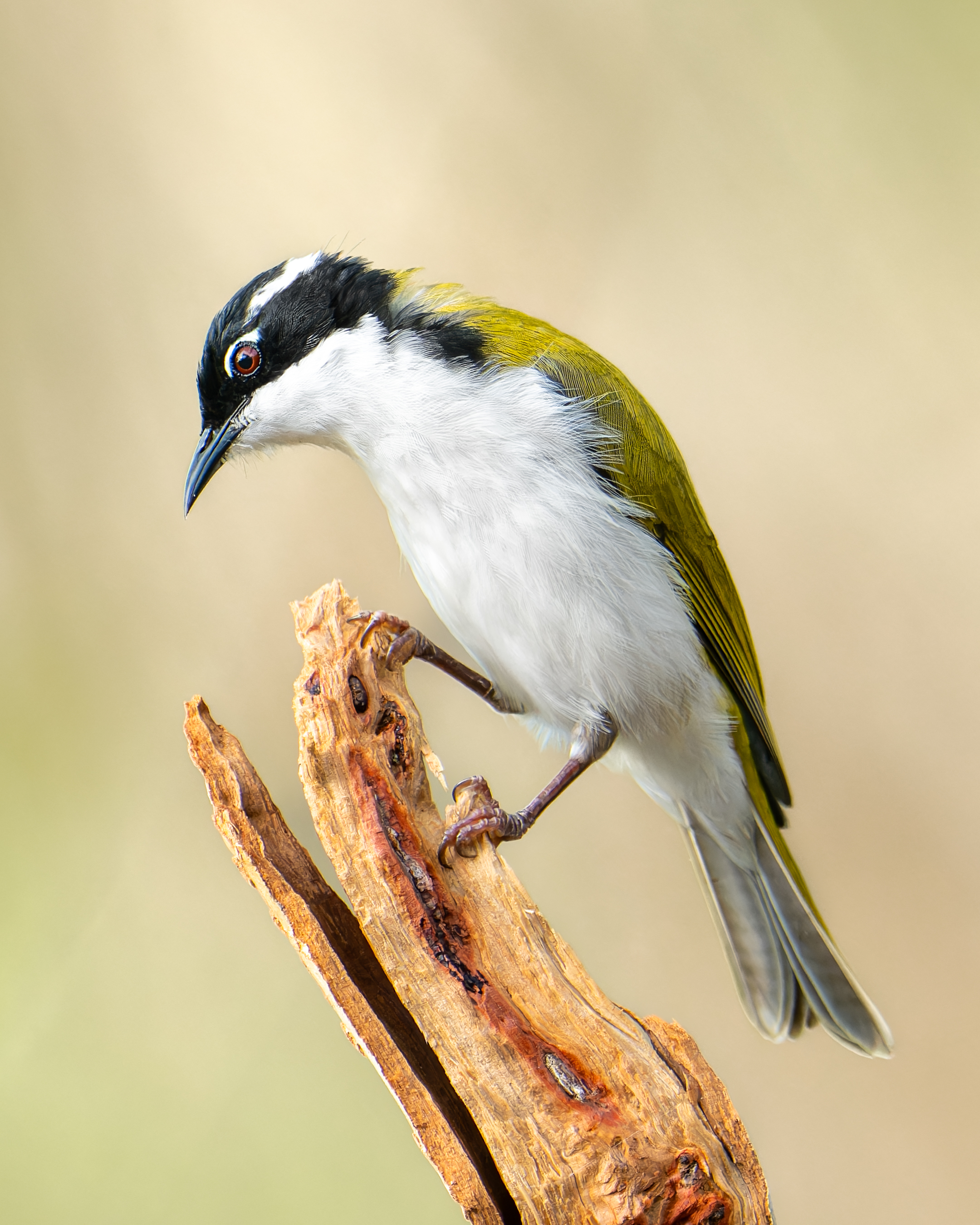
White-throated honeyeater
