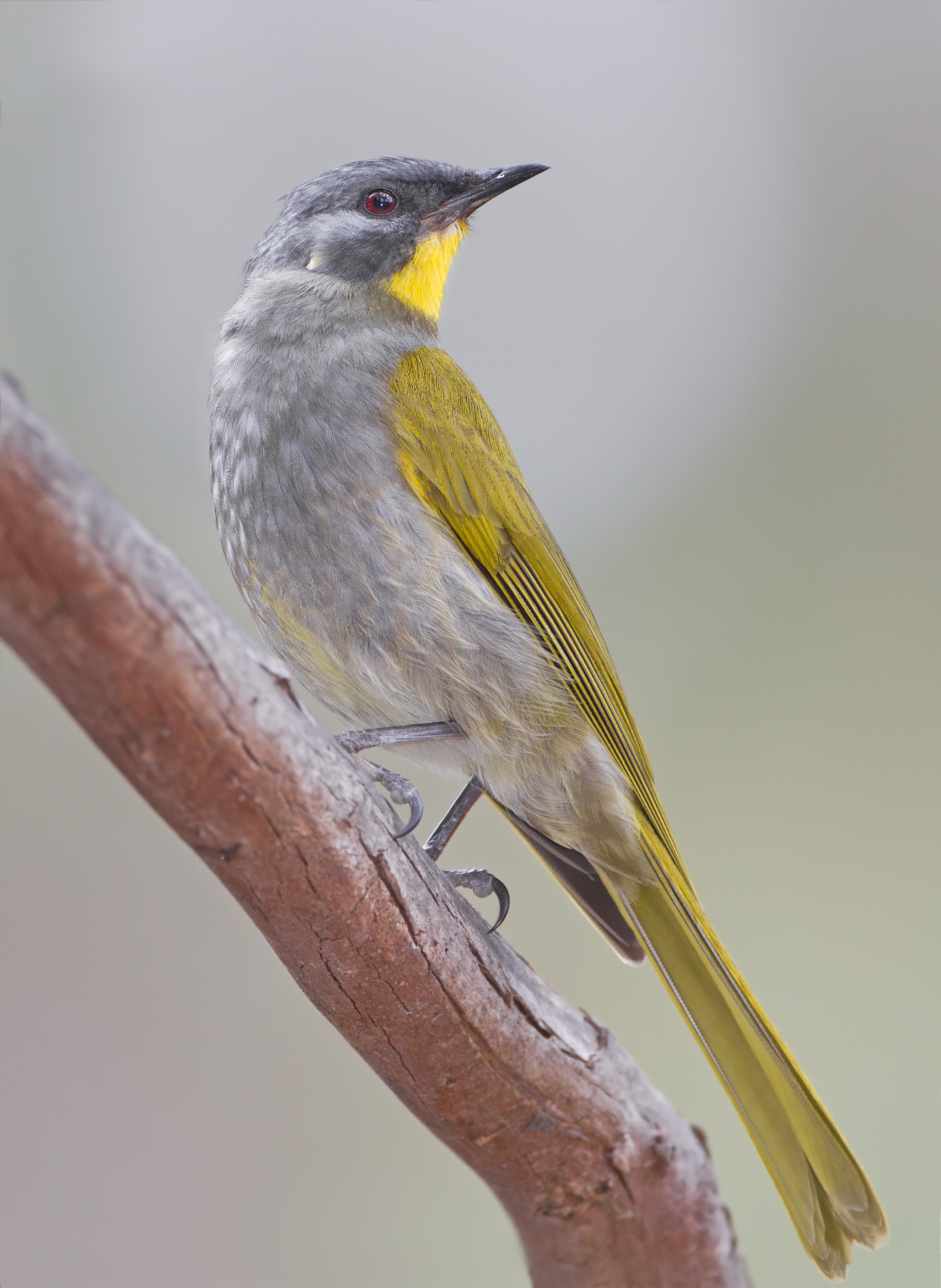

Conservation status
- Least Concern (IUCN 3.1)

Scientific classification
- Kingdom: Animalia
- Phylum: Chordata
- Class: Aves
- Order: Passeriformes
- Family: Meliphagidae
- Genus: Nesoptilotis
- Species: N. flavicollis

Binomial name
- Nesoptilotis flavicollis (Vieillot, 1817)
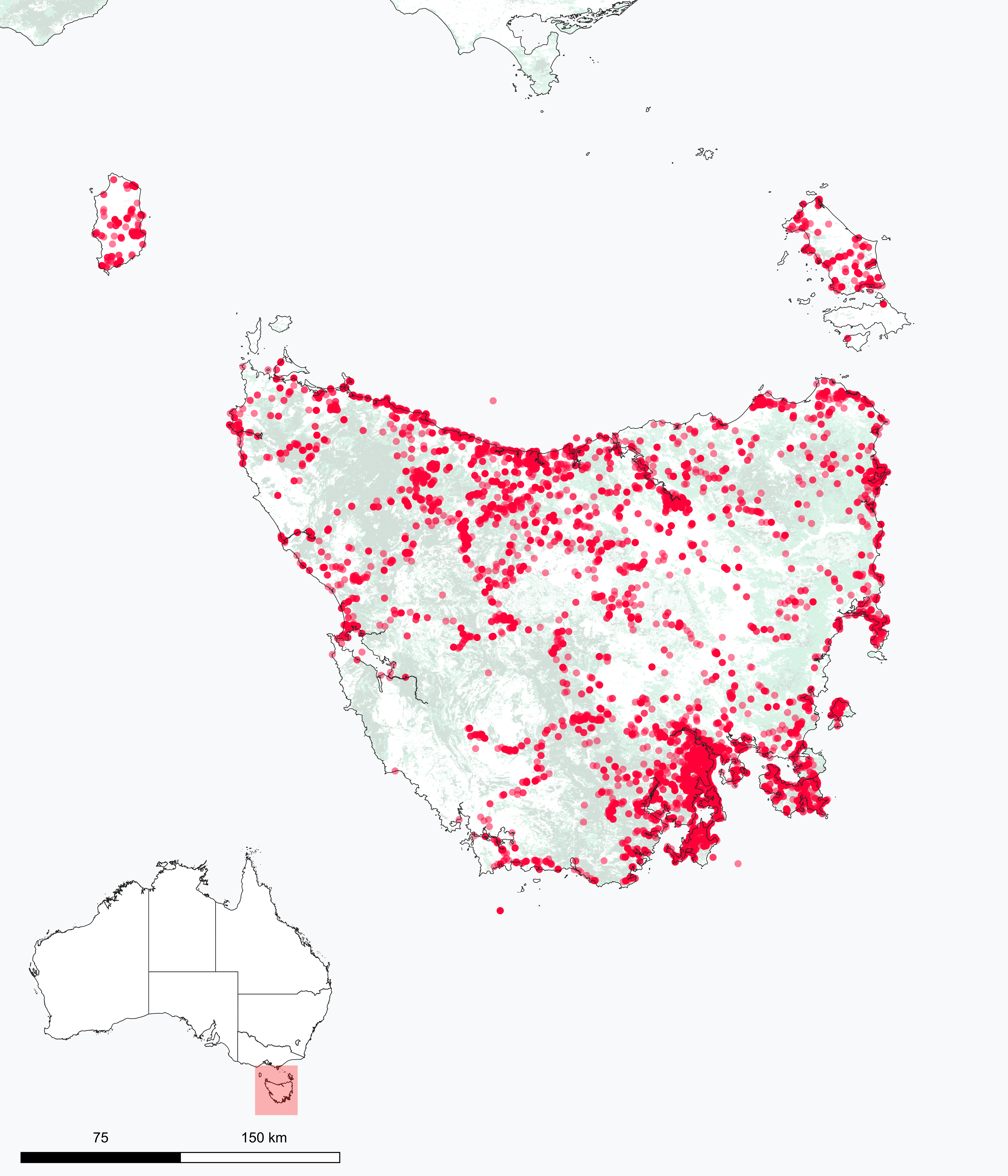

Synonyms
- Lichenostomus flavicollis

= Yellow-throated honeyeater =

Species of bird

The yellow-throated honeyeater (Nesoptilotis flavicollis) is a species of passerine bird in the honeyeater family Meliphagidae. It is similar in behaviour and appearance to the white-eared honeyeater and is endemic to Australia's island state of Tasmania. It was formerly considered a pest of orchards.

== Taxonomy ==
The species was originally described by French ornithologist Louis Pierre Vieillot in 1817, who placed it in the genus Melithreptus. Its specific epithet is derived from the Latin words flavus 'yellow', and collis 'neck'. Other vernacular names are the green cherry-picker, green dick or green linnet.

The yellow-throated honeyeater was previously placed in the genus Lichenostomus, but was moved to Nesoptilotis after a molecular phylogenetic analysis, published in 2011, showed that the original genus was polyphyletic. It is a sister taxon to the white-eared honeyeater (N. leucotis), which occurs on mainland Australia but not in Tasmania, and they belong to a clade that contains the genera Entomyzon, Melithreptus and Foulehaio.

== Description ==
The yellow-throated honeyeater is a medium-sized honeyeater with a relatively long tail. Typical weight is 31 g (1.1 oz) and the average length is 21 cm (8.3 in). The plumage is bright olive-green above, with a silver-grey crown, face, and underbelly, contrasting with a distinctive bright yellow chin and throat. There is a small yellow ear-patch and the wing feathers are outlined with yellow. The bill is black and the eye is a deep ruby red. Females are smaller than males. Juvenile birds are very similar to adults, but duller.

== Distribution and habitat ==
The yellow-throated honeyeater is common and widespread on the mainland of Tasmania, King Island and the Furneaux Group. It is not considered threatened.

Its natural habitat is temperate forests, woodlands, and coastal scrub and heath. Both wet and dry sclerophyll forests are the preferred habitats, with other habitats like alpine eucalypt woodland and open eucalypt woodland, cool rainforest, coastal heathlands, and shrublands also being used. They may also be found in golf courses, orchards, parks and gardens. Older stands of dry sclerophyll may be adversely affected by fire.

== Behaviour ==
A yellow-throated honeyeater calling

The yellow-throated honeyeater is territorial and quite aggressive towards other honeyeaters, pardalotes, golden whistlers, and grey shrike-thrushes, and will chase them away from their territories.

=== Feeding ===
The yellow-throated honeyeater feeds mainly on arthropods, also taking some nectar, and occasionally fruit or seeds. The species forages from the canopy down to the ground, usually singly or in pairs. Food is obtained by gleaning from trunks, branches, and the ground, by probing between loose bark on the trunks, and by occasional sallying flights. More rarely flowers are investigated for insects or nectar.

=== Breeding ===
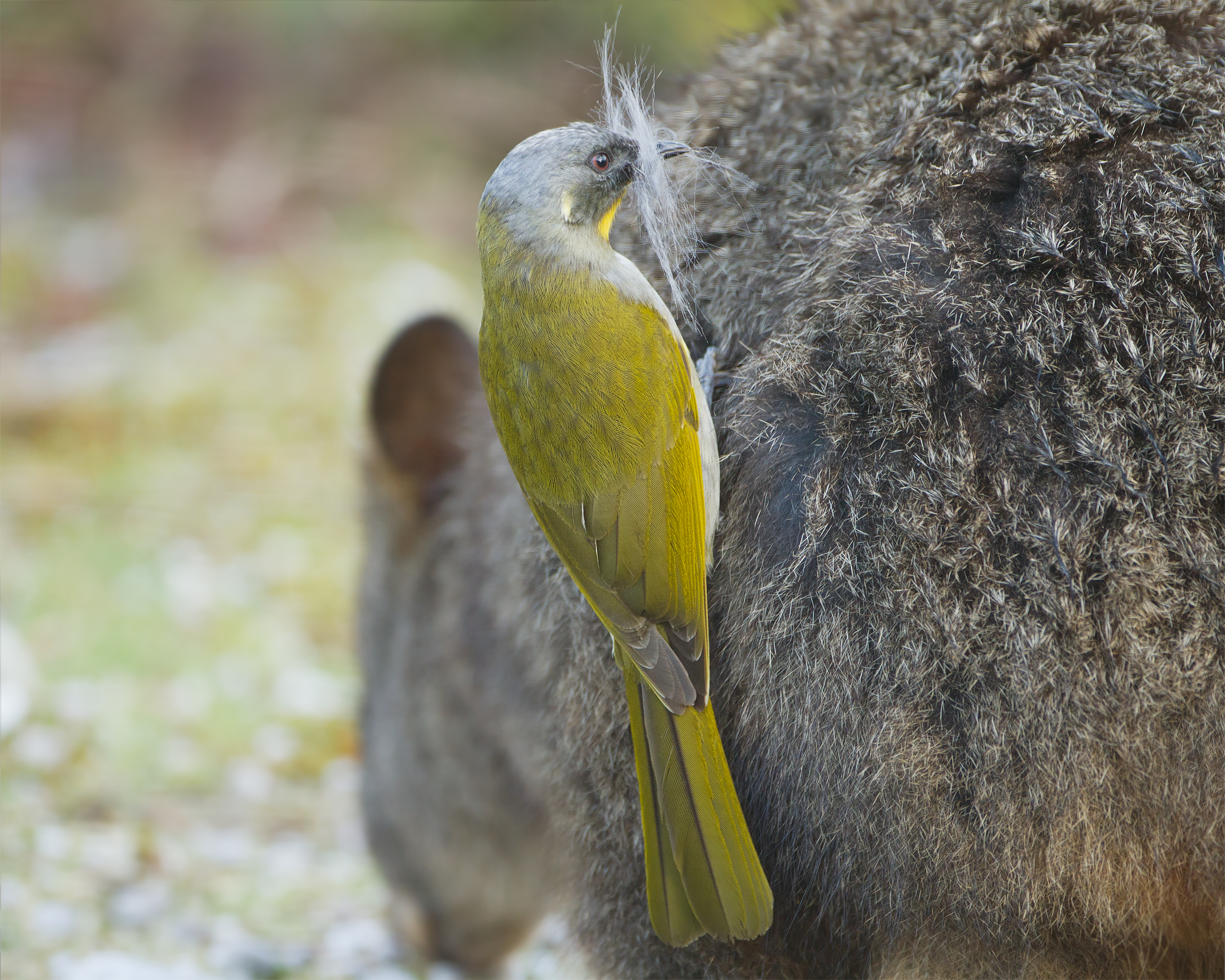
A yellow-throated honeyeater taking hair from a live Tasmanian pademelon for nesting material, Melaleuca, Southwest Conservation Area, Tasmania, Australia

Breeding occurs from August to January. During breeding season females move into male territories. The nest is often within 1 m of the ground in a low bush or tussock, but may occasionally be found at up to 10 m (33 ft) in foliage. It is constructed by the female from grass, bark-shreds, leaves and spiders' web and lined with treefern fibres, wool, and fur. This species is known for collecting hair for the nest from live animals, such as horses, dogs, and humans. The female incubates the eggs and feeds the young. A typical clutch is two or three pinkish eggs, and the incubation period is approximately 16 days. The female alone incubates the eggs, and also feeds the nestlings. Hatchlings also spend around 16 days in the nest. The male will drive off the fledglings and the female when they are old enough to disperse (usually at around three weeks). This species is parasitised by the fan-tailed cuckoo and the pallid cuckoo.

=== Calls ===
The yellow-throated honeyeater makes a variety of calls. These include a breeding call, used for attracting mates, and to advertise ownership of a territory. That call varies geographically, but essentially consists of a whirring chur-uk, chur-uk or a loud de-wit, and is used during breeding season. Another common call is a repeated tonk, tonk, tonk or tchook, tchook.
