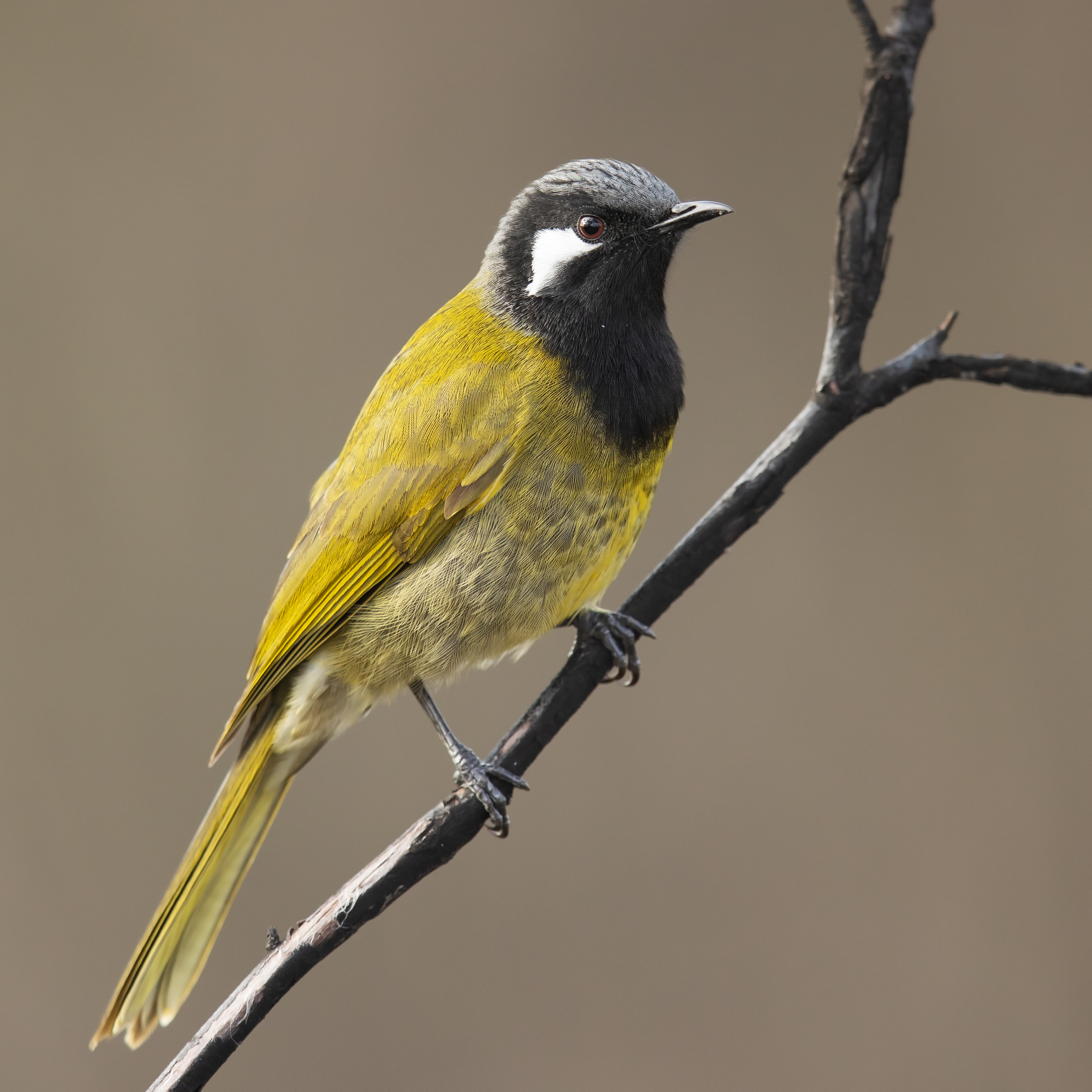

Conservation status
- Least Concern (IUCN 3.1)

Scientific classification
- Kingdom: Animalia
- Phylum: Chordata
- Class: Aves
- Order: Passeriformes
- Family: Meliphagidae
- Genus: Nesoptilotis
- Species: N. leucotis

Binomial name
- Nesoptilotis leucotis (Latham, 1801)
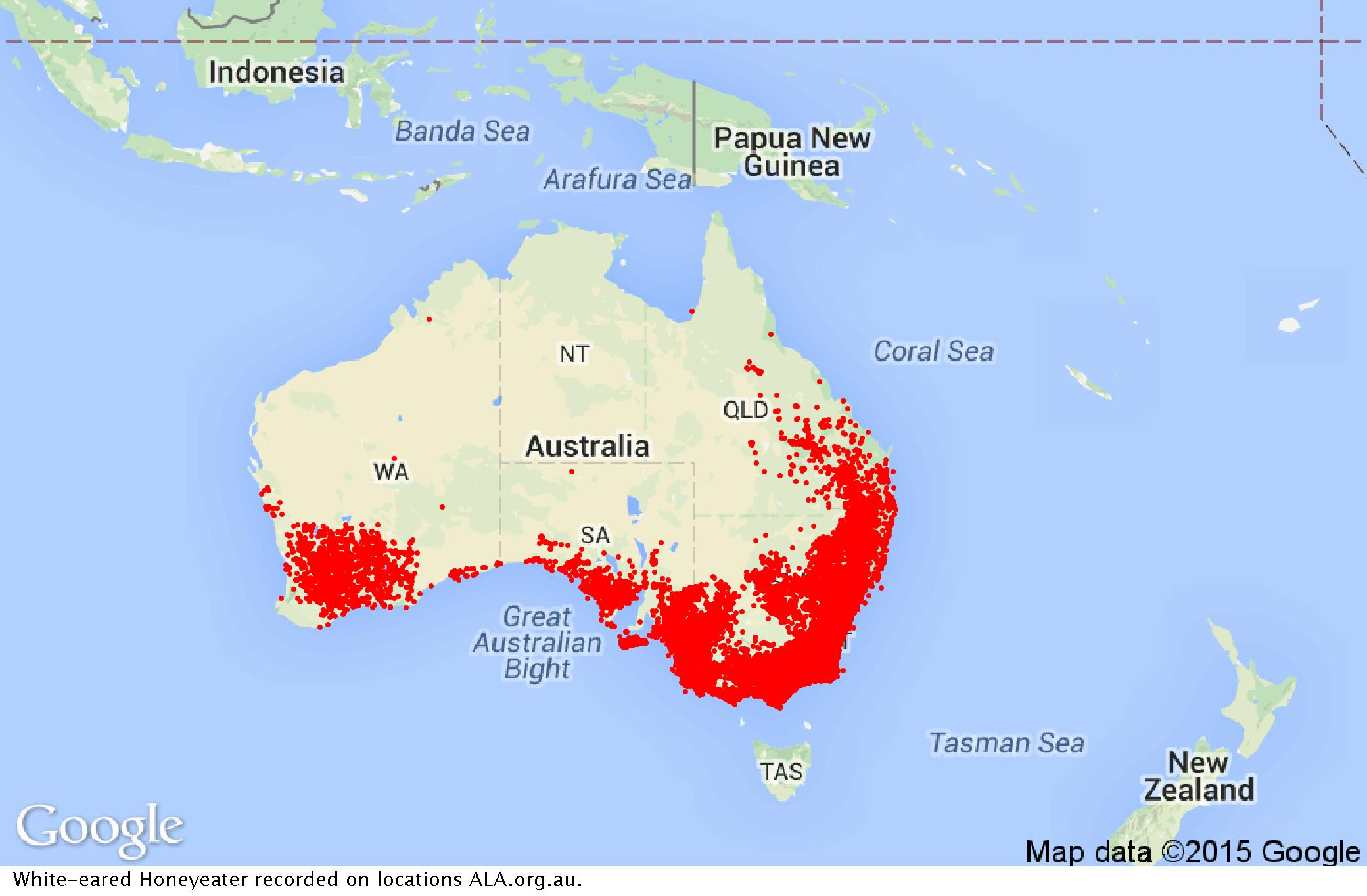
- Range map of the white-eared honeyeater (Nesoptilotis leucotis)

Synonyms
- Lichenostomus leucotis

= White-eared honeyeater =

Species of bird

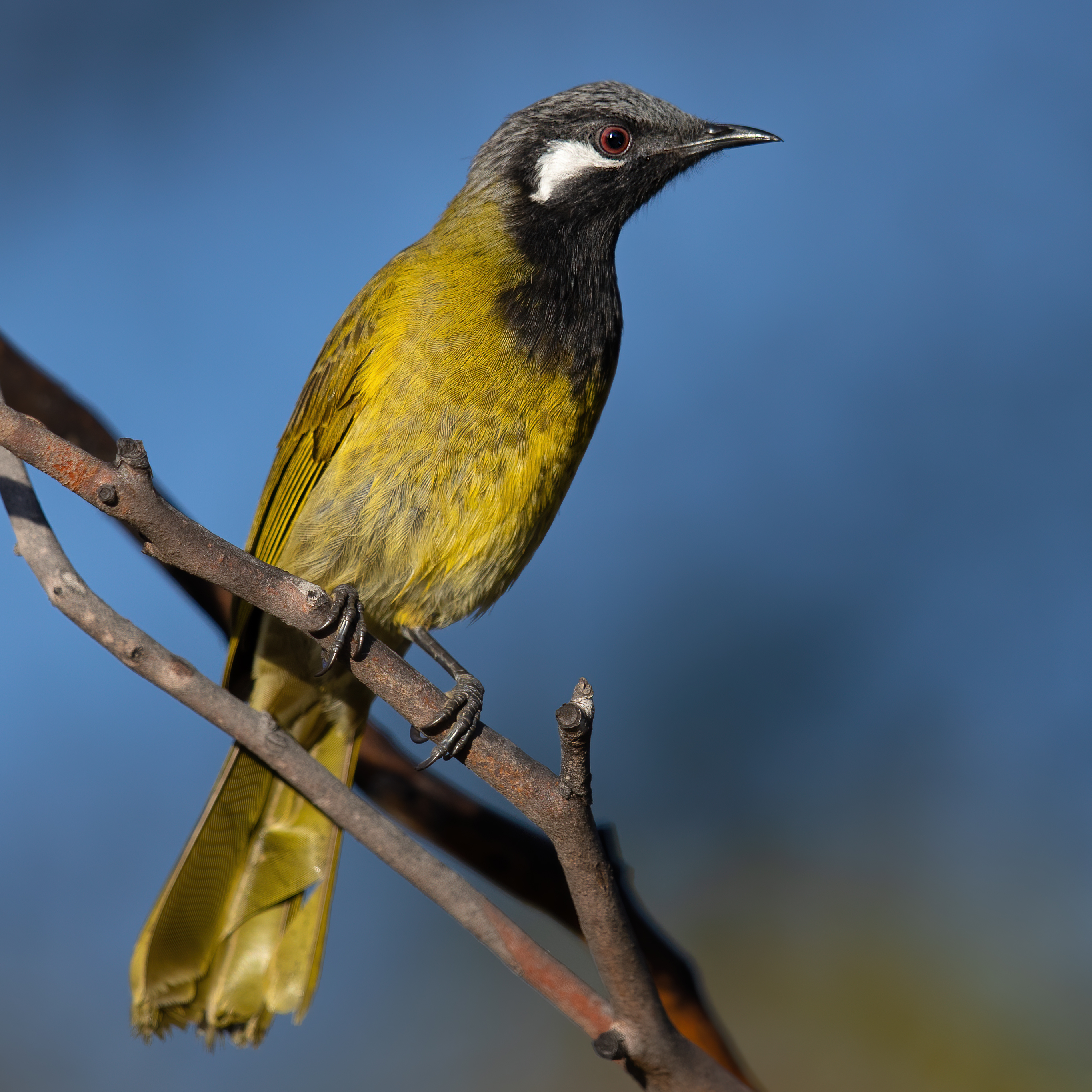
White-eared honeyeater

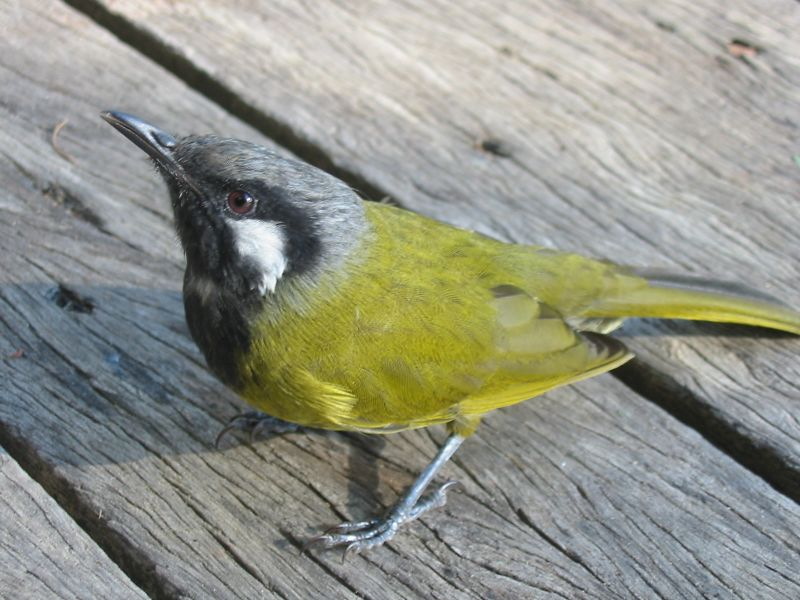
White-eared honeyeater

The white-eared honeyeater (Nesoptilotis leucotis) is a medium-sized honeyeater found in Australia. It is a member of the family Meliphagidae (honeyeaters and Australian chats) which has 190 recognised species with about half of them found in Australia. This makes them members of the most diverse family of birds in Australia. White-eared honeyeaters are easily identifiable by their olive-green body, black head and white ear-patch.

== Taxonomy ==
The white-eared honeyeater was first described by English ornithologist John Latham in 1801 as Turdus leucotis. It has been reclassified several times and was previously named Lichenostomus leucotis and Ptilotis leucotis torringtoni.

The white-eared honeyeater was previously placed in the genus Lichenostomus, but it was moved to Nesoptilotis after a molecular phylogenetic analysis, published in 2011, showed that the original genus was polyphyletic. It is a sister taxon to the yellow-throated honeyeater (N. flavicollis) that occurs in Tasmania, and they belong to a clade that contains the genera Entomyzon, Melithreptus, and Foulehaio.

There are two recognised subspecies: the nominate subspecies Nesoptilotis leucotis leucotis is found from eastern central Queensland through New South Wales and Victoria to southeastern South Australia; the subspecies N. l. novaenorciae is found in southwestern Western Australia and the Eyre Peninsula of South Australia.

== Description ==
The white-eared honeyeater has an olive-green upper and lower body; its wings and tail are a mix of brown, yellow and olive; the crown is dark grey with black streaks; its cheeks and throat are black; its ear-coverts are white. Its iris is red or brown (juvenile); its bill is black and its legs are dark grey. The white-eared honeyeater is a medium-sized honeyeater 19–22 centimetres (7.5–8.7 in) in length. There is no sexual dimorphism, with males and females looking alike. They weigh approximately 20 g (0.71 oz) and have a beak length of approximately 17 mm (0.67 in).

=== Voice ===
Their voice is deep and mellow but slightly metallic chwok, chwok, chwok-whit and kwitchu, kwitchu; very sharply scratchy, metallic chwik!.

== Distribution and habitat ==
The white-eared honeyeater's preferred habitat is in forests, woodlands, heathlands, mallee and dry inland scrublands. A eucalyptus canopy, rough bark and a shrub layer are the most important requirements for white-eared honeyeaters. The canopy can provide nectar in spring, the bark can provide insects year round, and the shrub layer is used for nesting and shelter. The white-eared honeyeater prefers mature vegetation with a dense understory. They are relatively unselective regarding habitat, both floristically and structurally, as they can be found in many different forest and woodland types, and either edge or interior habitats. White-eared honeyeaters can be found in small (< 2 ha) woodland patches. Habitats they do not like are those that are heavily degraded, recently burnt, or have little to no understory.

=== Races ===
There are four recognised races of N. leucotis. Race leucotis is found in eastern Australia from Victoria to central Queensland. Proposals that this subspecies may, in fact, consist of two races, on either side of the Great Dividing Range, have recently been confirmed with the description of race schoddei from mallee woodland on the Eyre Peninsula, west to near the head of the Great Australian Bight, north-west through the Gawler Ranges and the Yellabinna region, at least to Maralinga. Evidence for this is that the populations on the eastern, coastal side of the Great Dividing Range have intense green upperparts, and are light greenish-yellow on the belly, whereas, populations in the western, inland side of the Great Dividing Range are a duller olive colour and become slightly smaller. The Nullarbor Plain separates this race from the race novaenorciae, which is found in Western Australia. The western race novaenorciae is categorised on the basis of size differences, being about 20% smaller than race leucotis. Both populations look very similar, but they have significant genetic differences. Populations of white-eared honeyeaters in Western Australia have significant genetic changes (2.23%) compared to eastern populations; however, there are no significant phenotypic changes. The fourth recognised race is thomasi, which is found on Kangaroo Island in South Australia.

Populations of white-eared honeyeaters found in arid regions and the Mallee, as well as all populations of race novaenorciae, do not need a shrub layer or understory in their habitat.

== Behaviour ==
White-eared honeyeaters are usually solitary, but may also be found in small family groups. They can be sedentary, nomadic or locally migratory.

=== Breeding ===
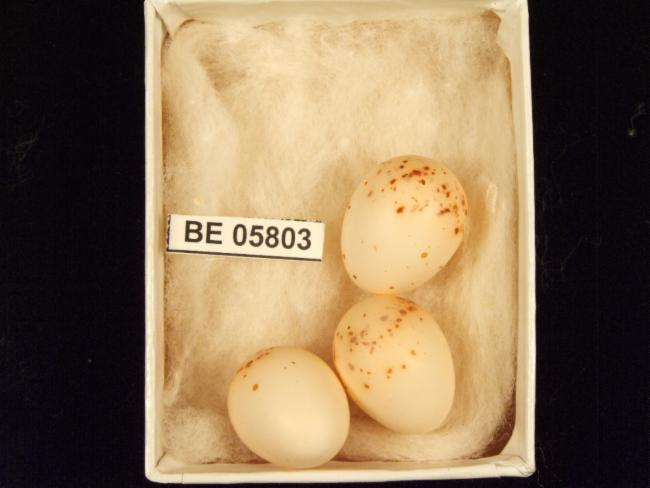
Eggs of the white-eared honeyeater

White-eared honeyeaters breed and nest from July to March. The nest is built among tangled twigs and leaves, low in a small shrub, bracken or coarse grass from 0.5 to 5 m high. The cup-shaped nest is constructed out of dry grass, fine stems, thin strips of bark and held together with cobwebs. The nest is lined with soft vegetation, down, feathers, hair, or fur. White-eared honeyeaters will pluck fur and hairs from livestock, humans, and native wildlife, such as kangaroos and wallabies. White-eared honeyeaters form territories, which can expand during winter when some key resources are in lower densities. A clutch is typically 2 or 3 eggs. The eggs are oval shaped, white with brown speckles at the large end and measure 21 x 15mm. A clutch is typically 2 or 3 eggs. The parents are obligate cooperative breeders of their chicks.

The lifespan of the white-eared honeyeater is unknown; however, many species of Australian honeyeaters (Meliphagidae) have an average lifespan of 10 to 15 years. It is likely that the white-eared honeyeater is somewhere in this range.

=== Food and feeding ===
White-eared honeyeaters feed on nectar and insects. They are often considered nectarivores, but feed on insects just as much. They feed on nectar during the spring and summer (August - December), but switch to insects for the rest of the year. White-eared honeyeaters actively probe for insects on tree trunks and branches. They prefer trees with soft, peeling and flaking bark, where insects may be present. They mostly collect termites and spiders, but will also feed on the lerp and honeydew produced by insects. While foraging, the white-eared honeyeater searches intensively for its insect prey, averaging one insect every 5 seconds. This high-volume approach to foraging indicates that the insects being consumed are of low nutritional value. Obligate nectarivores compete strongly with white-eared honeyeaters for the best nectar resources and obligate insectivores compete with white-eared honeyeaters for the best insect resources. This results in the white-eared honeyeater needing to use alternative sources of food, such as insects which are smaller or better at hiding. The yellow-faced honeyeater (Caligavis chrysops) has a similar feeding strategy to the white-eared honeyeater. Aggressive behaviour from the yellow-faced honeyeater directed at the white-eared honeyeater has been observed.

== Conservation status ==
Although the white-eared honeyeater has a decreasing population, it has an extensive distribution, and is considered to be of least concern on the IUCN Red List. Threats to the white-eared honeyeater include habitat degradation, fire and loss of understory.
