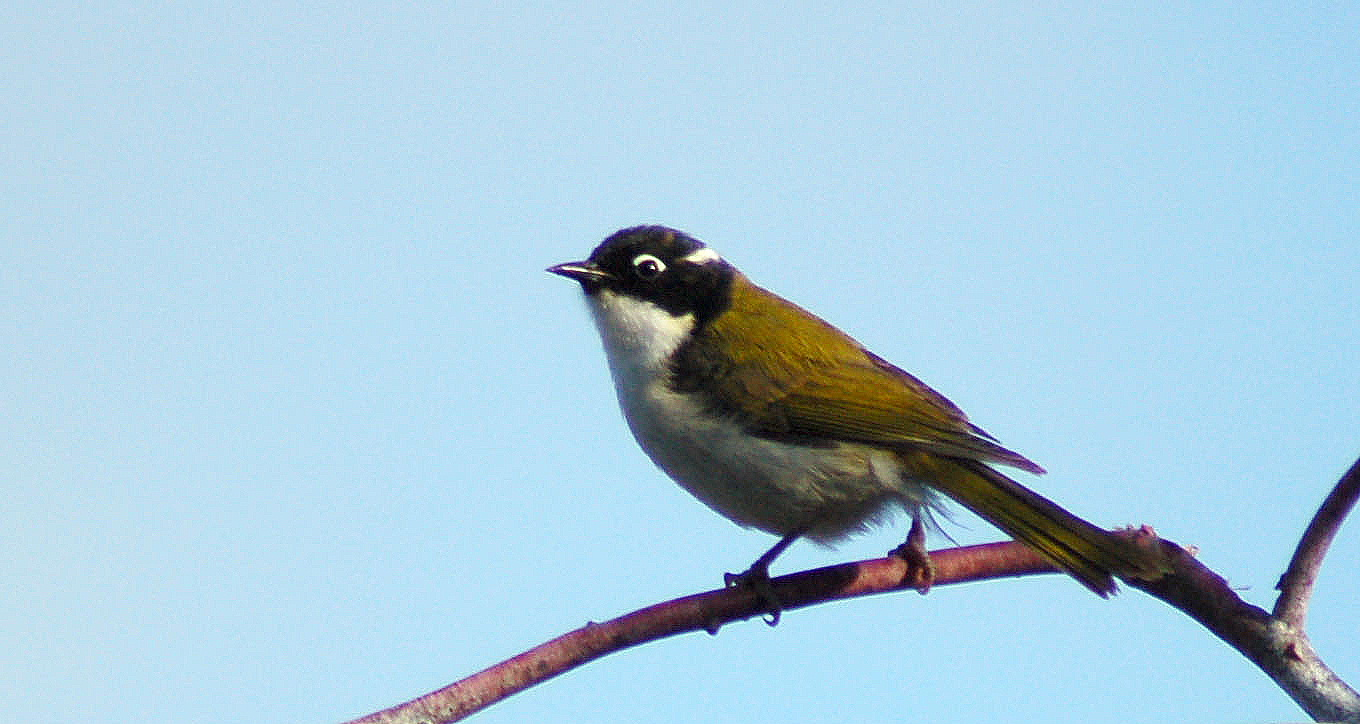

Conservation status
- Least Concern (IUCN 3.1)

Scientific classification
- Kingdom: Animalia
- Phylum: Chordata
- Class: Aves
- Order: Passeriformes
- Family: Meliphagidae
- Genus: Melithreptus
- Species: M. chloropsis

Binomial name
- Melithreptus chloropsis Gould, 1848

Synonyms
- Melithreptus whitlocki Mathews, 1909

= Gilbert's honeyeater =

Species of bird

Gilbert's honeyeater (Melithreptus chloropsis), also known as the Swan River honeyeater or western white-naped honeyeater, is a passerine bird of the honeyeater family Meliphagidae native to southwestern Australia. A mid-sized honeyeater, it is olive-green above and white below, with a black head, nape and throat and a white patch over the eye and a white crescent-shaped patch on the nape. The bill is brownish-black and the eyes a dull red. The sexes have similar plumage.

== Taxonomy ==
Gilbert's honeyeater was originally described by John Gould in 1848, who gave it the species epithet chloropsis from the Ancient Greek terms chloros 'green-yellow' and opsis 'eye'. Gregory Mathews coined the name Melithreptus whitlocki in 1909 from a specimen collected by a Mr F. L. Whitlock from Wilson Inlet. Mathews stated that it was distinct due to having a white eye-ring year-round. This is no longer recognised as a distinguishing feature.

Treated as a subspecies of the white-naped honeyeater for many years, Gilbert's honeyeater was found in a 2010 study to have diverged early on from the lunatus complex. It forms a superspecies with the white-naped and black-headed honeyeaters. It is a member of the genus Melithreptus, with several species of similar size and (apart from the brown-headed honeyeater) black-headed appearance, in the honeyeater family. Meliphagidae. Within the genus, it is classified in the subgenus Melithreptus, along with the white-naped, black-headed and white-throated honeyeaters; these all forage for insects in foliage or canopy, rather than on bark or branches, congregate in larger flocks, and are found in more open, dry sclerophyll forest and savanna. They also have smaller feet and a less prominent or missing nuchal bar.

The next closest relative outside the genus is the much larger, but similarly marked, blue-faced honeyeater. More recently, DNA analysis has shown honeyeaters to be related to the Pardalotidae (pardalotes), Acanthizidae (Australian warblers, scrubwrens, thornbills, etc.), and the Maluridae (Australian fairy-wrens) in the large superfamily Meliphagoidea.

"Gilbert's honeyeater" has been designated as the official common name for the species by the International Ornithologists' Union (IOC), replacing "Swan River honeyeater" in 2015 and honouring its collector Gilbert and his work in Western Australia. The latter name had been coined by Gould, who added the species was known by various local indigenous names, including jingee (in lowlands), bun-geen (on mountains), and berril-berril (Swan River district). Proposed modern spellings are djinki, bongin and berilberil, respectively. Djiok is a name recorded from the vicinity of Albany.

== Description ==
A mid-sized honeyeater, Gilbert's honeyeater has olive-green upperparts and white underparts to the undertail. Both olive and white feathers have grey bases, which can be seen if the plumage is ruffled. White feathers on the flanks have dusky tips. It has a black head, nape and throat, a white patch over the eye, and a white crescent-shaped patch on the nape, which is thinner than that of other species. The bill is brownish-black and the eyes a dull red.

Within its range, its plumage is distinctive, rendering it unlikely to be confused with other species, apart from the related white-throated honeyeater (though this species are found much further north) or the Brown-headed honeyeater. Gilbert's honeyeater closely resembles the white-naped honeyeater; the plumage of the two is identical, except for the bare parts around the eye, which is pale-green to off-white in the former species, and red in the latter. Gilbert's honeyeater also has a longer bill and tarsus, and is slightly larger overall.

== Distribution and habitat ==
Gilbert's honeyeater is found in the southwest corner of Western Australia, where it ranges from Moora in the north, through the jarrah forest belt to Broomehill, the Stirling Range and along the coast to Stokes Inlet. It inhabits dry sclerophyll forests dominated by jarrah (Eucalyptus marginata), karri (E. diversicolor) or marri (Corymbia calophylla) inland, tuart (E. gomphocephala), flooded gum (E. rudis) or narrow-leaved paperbark (Melaleuca laxiflora) on the coastal plain, or wandoo (E. wandoo) woodland. Gilbert's honeyeater is generally sedentary or locally nomadic; birds on the Swan Coastal Plain generally move little. The species has become less common on the Swan Coastal Plain, and has vanished from Kellerberrin.

== Behaviour ==
=== Feeding ===
Gilbert's honeyeater mainly forages in the foliage and flowers in the canopy of tall eucalypts, though at times it ventures into understory plants and on the bark of treetrunks. Fieldwork in Dryandra Woodland revealed that they foraged at an average height of 7.7 m above the ground. It mainly hunts arthropods, particularly insects, as well as nectar, manna, honeydew and lerp.

=== Breeding ===
Breeding takes place across most of its range, with the breeding season taking place from September to February. The cup-shaped nests are located in the branches of trees, often hidden in foliage. The nests are usually made of bark fibres, rootlets and dry grasses at a height of up to 10 m above the ground. The clutch is of two, occasionally three, pale buff eggs marked with reddish-brown and grey spots and blotches, 18 x 14.4 mm in size. Eggs may be found from November to January; the incubation period is 14 days. The young are born naked with closed eyes (altricial), but are soon covered in down. They spend 14 days in the nest before fledging.

=== Vocalisations ===
Gilbert's honeyeater has a harsh, grating call, as well as a continuously uttered, single-noted tsip.
