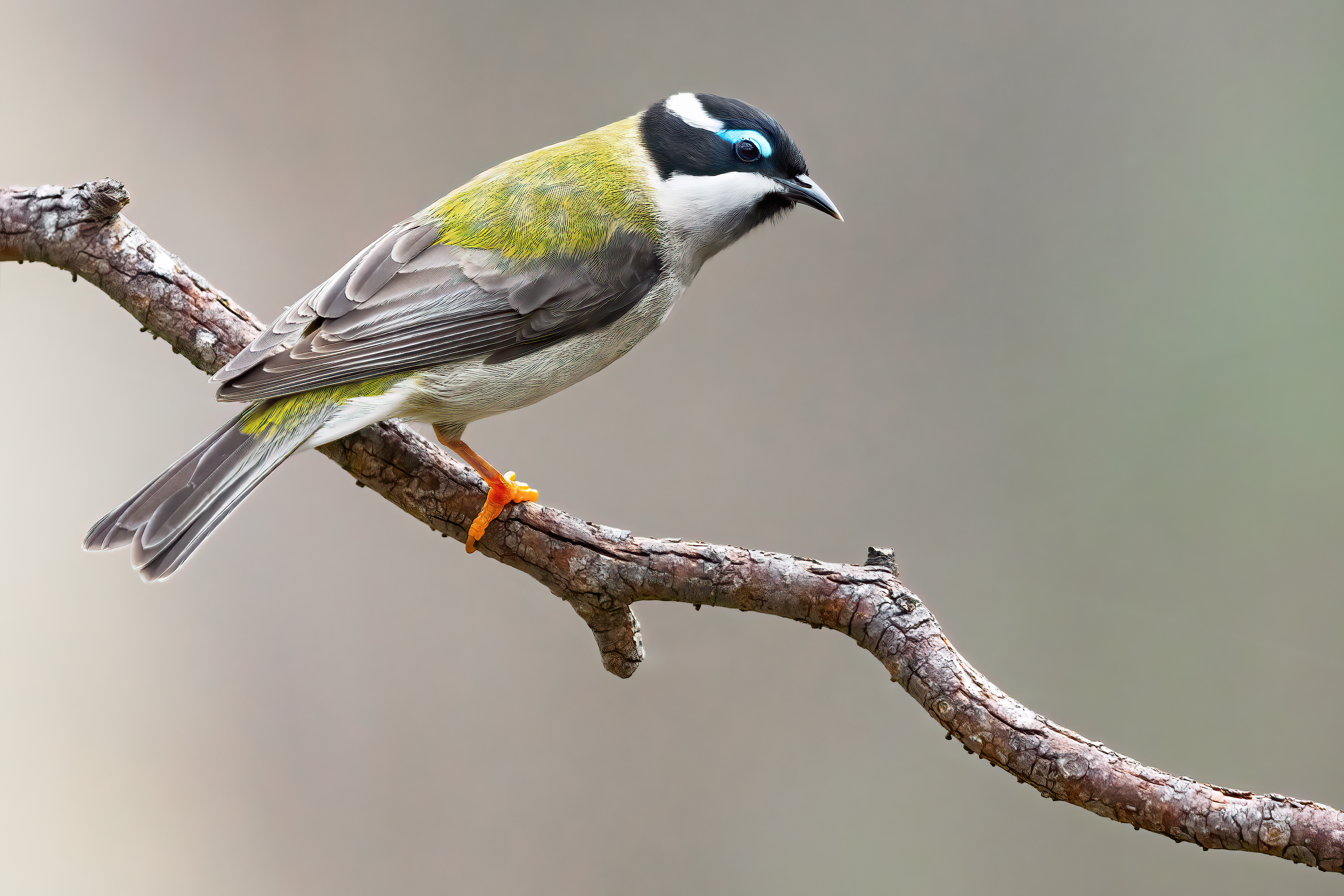
- Eastern subspecies
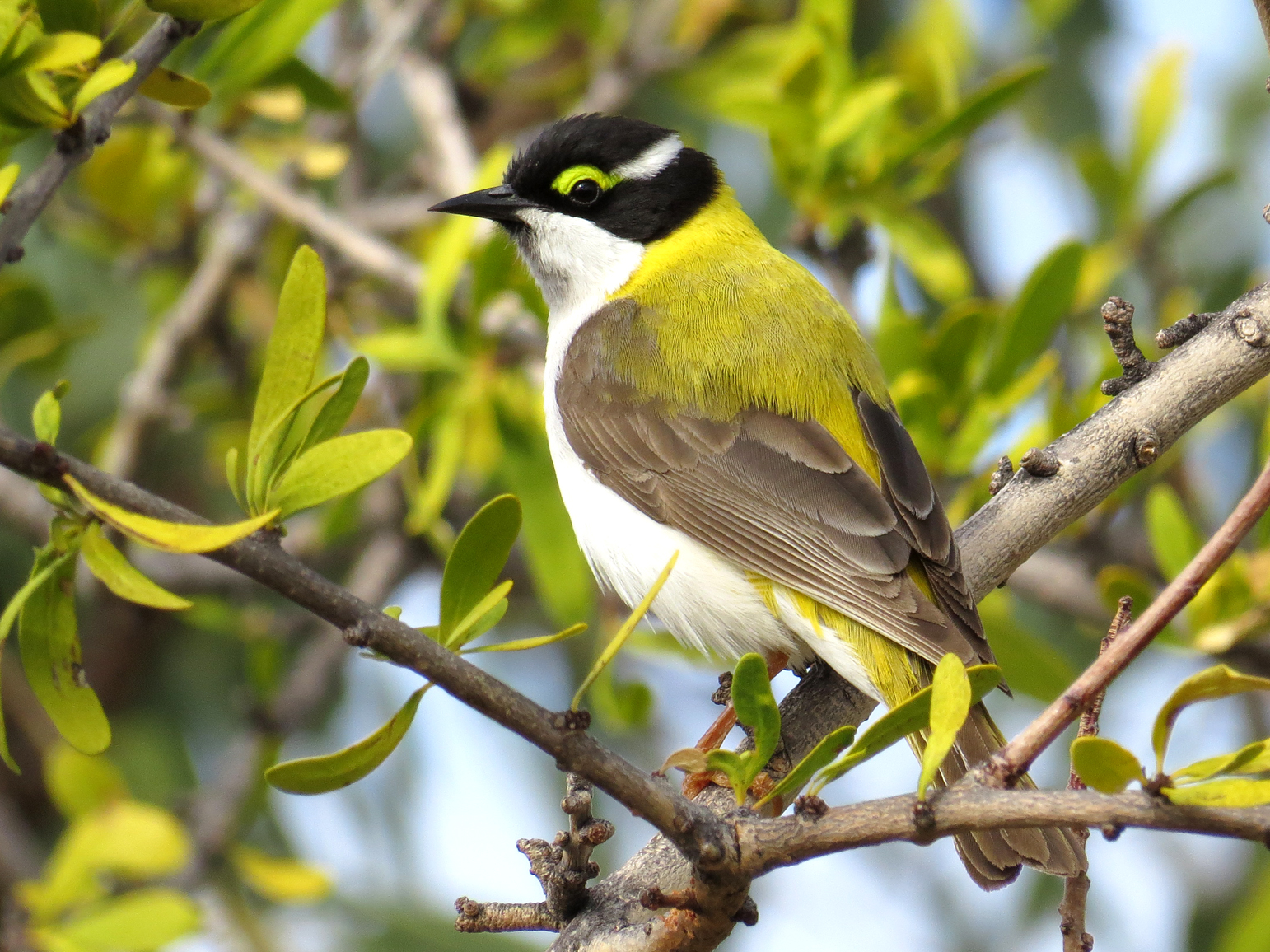
- Golden backed subspecies

Conservation status
- Least Concern (IUCN 3.1)

Scientific classification
- Kingdom: Animalia
- Phylum: Chordata
- Class: Aves
- Order: Passeriformes
- Family: Meliphagidae
- Genus: Melithreptus
- Species: M. gularis

Binomial name
- Melithreptus gularis (Gould, 1837)

Synonyms
- Melithreptus laetior (Gould, 1875)

= Black-chinned honeyeater =

Species of bird

The black-chinned honeyeater (Melithreptus gularis) is a species of passerine bird in the family Meliphagidae. It is endemic to Australia. Two subspecies are recognised. Its natural habitats are temperate forests and subtropical or tropical dry forests.

== Taxonomy ==
The black-chinned honeyeater was first described by John Gould in 1837 as Haematops gularis. He also described what he called the golden-backed honeyeater (as Melithreptus laetior) of northern Australia in 1875. Frederick George Waterhouse of the South Australian Museum had sent him four skins, writing of their beauty. Gould noted that it was clearly closely related to M. gularis, but differed in its plumage and smaller size. Richard Schodde united them into a single species in 1975, though Hugh Ford queried this in 1986, as he felt the two forms were as distinct as the yellow-tinted and fuscous honeyeaters that had similar ranges. Schodde countered that the black-chinned and golden-backed honeyeaters shared a much broader zone of hybridization. Since then they have been maintained as two subspecies of M. gularis, though Christidis and Boles noted in 2008 that data was limited and more fieldwork and genetic investigation were needed. Genetic data published in 2010 shows the two taxa diverged between 0.3 and 1.2 million years ago, separated by the Carpentarian Barrier, located south of the Gulf of Carpentaria.

The black-chinned honeyeater is a member of the genus Melithreptus, with several species of similar size and (apart from the brown-headed honeyeater) black-headed appearance, in the honeyeater family Meliphagidae. Molecular markers show the black-chinned honeyeater is most closely related to the brown-headed, while the similarly plumaged strong-billed honeyeater was actually an earlier offshoot between 6.7 and 3.4 million years ago. These three species are classified in the subgenus Eidopsarus; they have short sturdy feet, congregate in smaller flocks, live in more forested habitat than the other subgenus, and probe for insects on branches and bark, rather than in the foliage.

== Description ==
A mid-sized honeyeater ranging from 14 to 16 cm (5.6–6.4 in) in length, it is olive-brown above and buff below, with a black head, nape and throat, with a bluish patch of bare skin over the eye and a white crescent-shaped patch on the nape. The legs and feet are orange. Juveniles have an all-over browner plumage. It makes a scratchy creep-creep-creep call, as well as a more musical one. Ford noted that individuals from southeastern Queensland northwards had more yellow-tinged upperparts and paler underparts; and that those of northeastern Queensland more matched the golden-backed subspecies, though the bare skin around their eyes remained aqua-blue.

The golden-backed subspecies differs by having a yellow nape and rump, green-yellow back, smaller black on chin, more grey-white than buff breast, white flanks and abdomen, lighter brown wings, green-edged rectrices, and yellow-green bare skin around the eyes.

== Distribution and habitat ==
The range of the black-chinned honeyeater is across northern Australia, from northwest Western Australia (including the Kimberley, Pilbara, Great Sandy and northern Gibson deserts), through the Top End and the Gulf Country to Cape York in Queensland, through central and eastern Queensland and into central New South Wales. It occurs east of the Great Divide in the Northern Rivers region of New South Wales, but is rare further south and appears to have declined in the Sydney region. It is found across central and northern Victoria and into eastern South Australia. It is considered vulnerable in New South Wales and South Australia, although it is secure overall. It lives in open woodland and dry sclerophyll forest, often near watercourses.

The species is absent from savanna on the western edge of the Einasleigh Uplands, particularly around the Newcastle and Gregory Ranges.

== Feeding ==
Insects form the bulk of the diet, and like its close relatives, the brown-headed and strong-billed honeyeaters, the black-chinned honeyeater forages by probing in the bark of trunks and branches of trees.

== Breeding ==
Black-chinned honeyeaters may nest from July to December, breeding once or twice during this time. The nest is a thick-walled bowl of grasses and bits of bark, lined with softer plant material, hidden in the outer foliage of a tall tree, usually a eucalypt. One or (more commonly) two eggs are laid, 22 × 16 mm in size, and shiny, buff-pink, sparsely spotted with red-brown (more so on the larger end).
