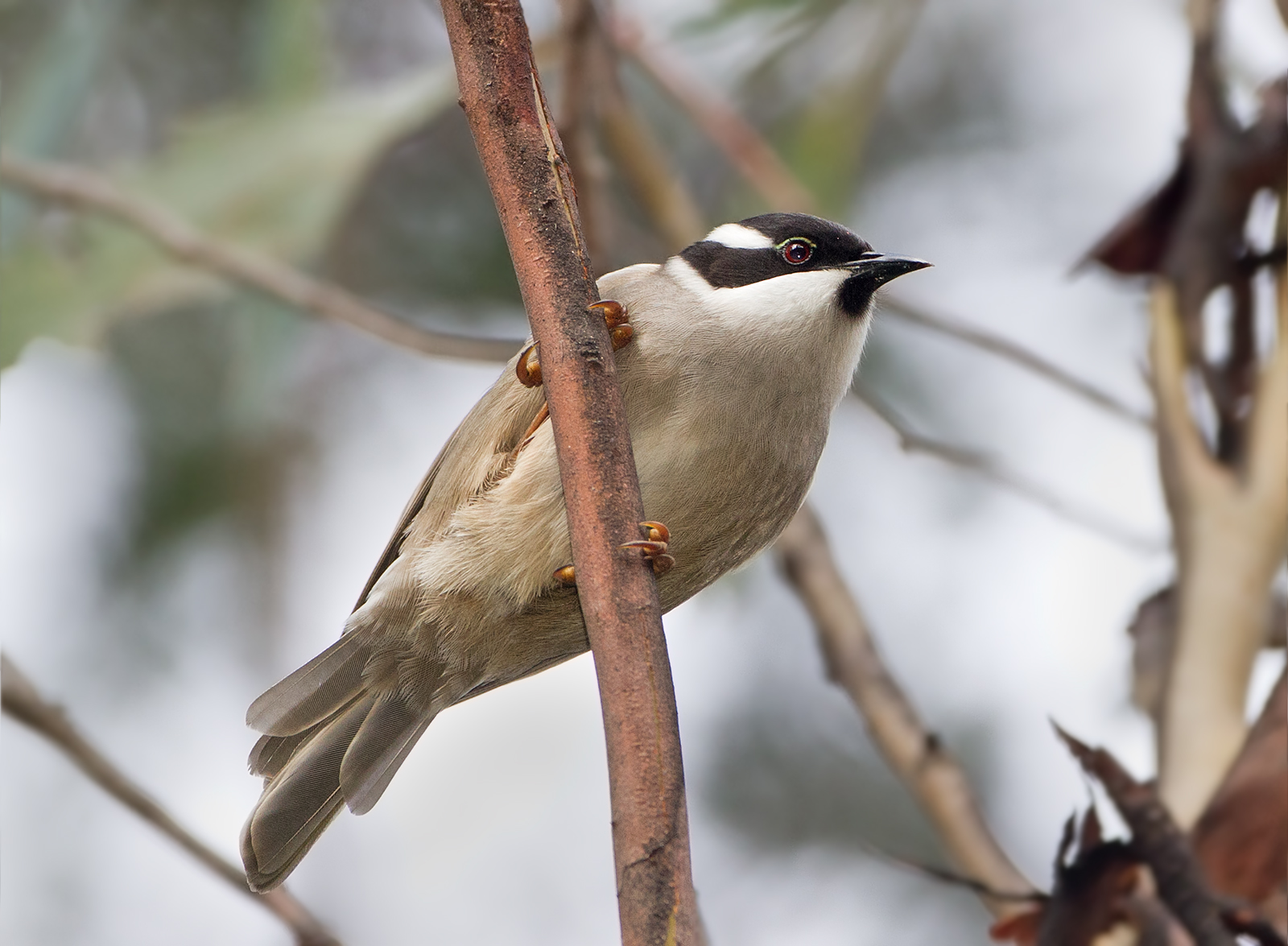

Conservation status
- Vulnerable (IUCN 3.1)

Scientific classification
- Kingdom: Animalia
- Phylum: Chordata
- Class: Aves
- Order: Passeriformes
- Family: Meliphagidae
- Genus: Melithreptus
- Species: M. validirostris

Binomial name
- Melithreptus validirostris (Gould, 1837)
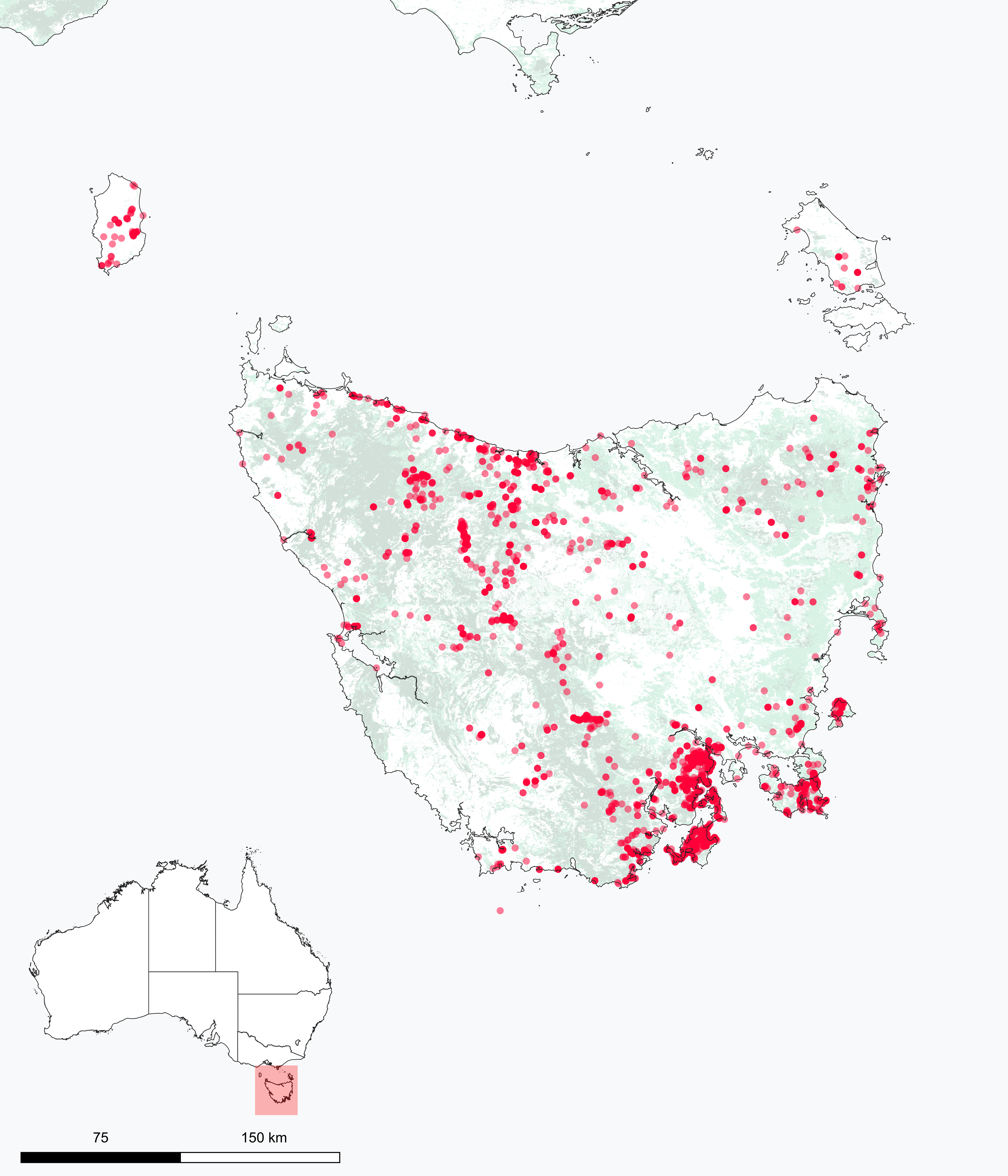

Synonyms
- Eidopsarus bicinctus Swainson

= Strong-billed honeyeater =

Species of bird

The strong-billed honeyeater (Melithreptus validirostris) is a species of bird in the family Meliphagidae. It is one of two species of the genus Melithreptus endemic to Tasmania. Its natural habitat is temperate forest.

== Taxonomy ==
The strong-billed honeyeater was first described by ornithologist John Gould in 1837. Its specific name is derived from the Latin words validus 'strong', and rostrum 'bill'. It is a member of the genus Melithreptus, with several species of similar size and (apart from the brown-headed honeyeater) black-headed appearance, in the honeyeater family, Meliphagidae. Molecular markers show that the strong-billed honeyeater separated from the common ancestor of the brown-headed and black-chinned honeyeaters between 6.7 and 3.4 million years ago.

The next closest relative outside the genus is the much larger, but similarly marked, blue-faced honeyeater. More recently, DNA analysis has shown honeyeaters to be related to the Pardalotidae (pardalotes), Acanthizidae (Australian warblers, scrubwrens, thornbills, etc.), and the Maluridae (Australian fairy-wrens) in the large superfamily Meliphagoidea.

== Description ==
A mid-sized honeyeater at 16.5–17.5 cm (6.5–7 in) in length, it is olive-brown above and pale grey-brown below, with a black head, nape and throat, a pale blue to off-white patch over the eye, and a white crescent on the nape. Juveniles have brownish crowns, lemon-tinged nape, and an orange base of bill. Its call is a loud cheep cheep, or a churring.

== Ecology ==
The strong-billed honeyeater is found in mature forest with large trees, such as Eucalyptus regnans and E. delegatensis. Its diet is principally insects and various other invertebrates, which it hunts on tree trunks, supplemented by nectar and fallen fruit. Although both species are widespread in Tasmania, the Strong-billed rarely overlaps in site and foraging with the black-headed honeyeater.

=== Breeding ===
Strong-billed honeyeaters may nest from September to January, breeding once or twice during this time. The nest is a thick-walled bowl of grasses and bits of bark in the fork of a tall tree, usually a eucalypt. Two or three eggs are laid, 22 x 17 mm in size, and shiny, buff-pink, sparsely spotted with red-brown.
