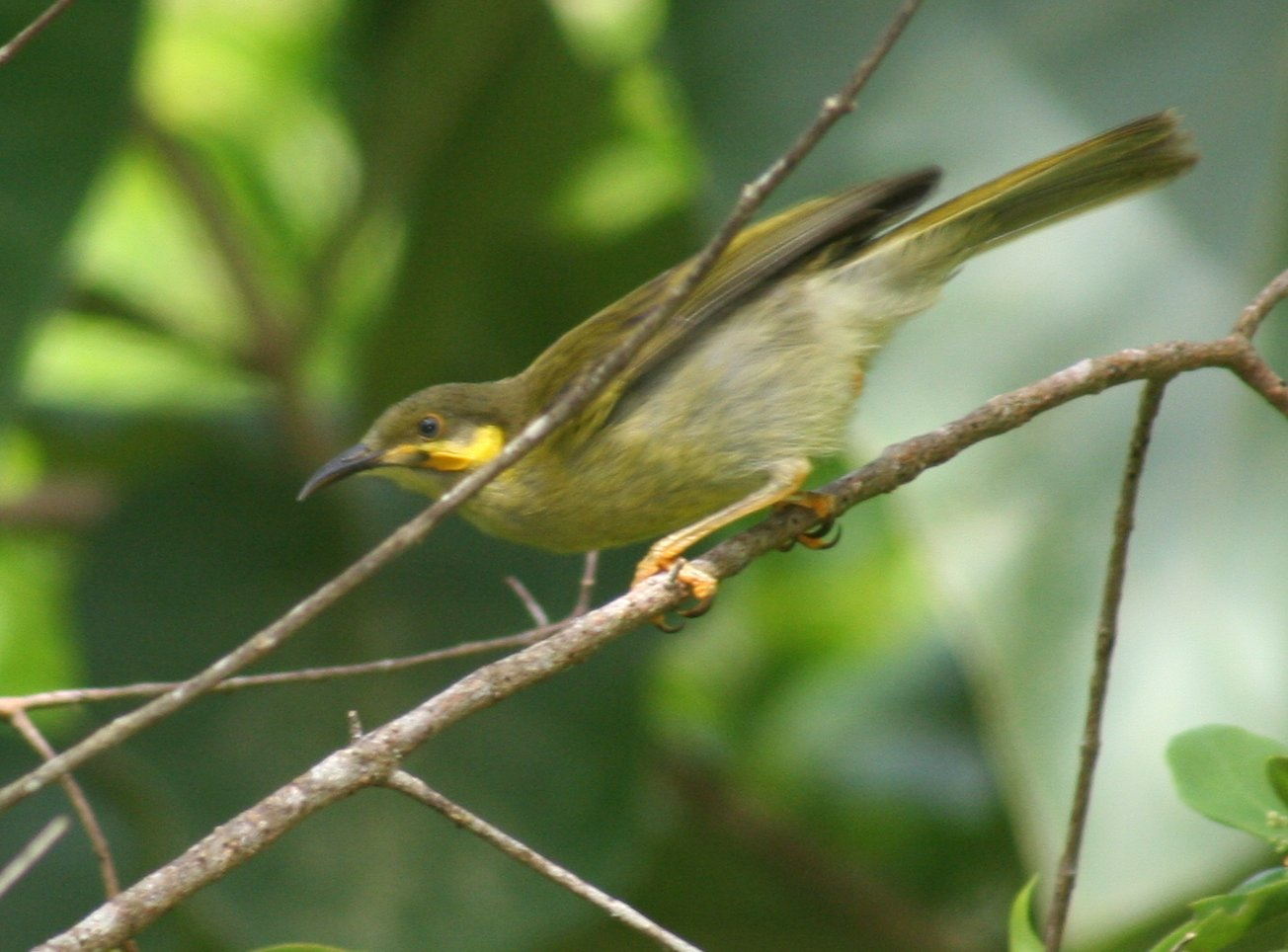

Conservation status
- Least Concern (IUCN 3.1)

Scientific classification
- Kingdom: Animalia
- Phylum: Chordata
- Class: Aves
- Order: Passeriformes
- Family: Meliphagidae
- Genus: Foulehaio
- Species: F. carunculatus

Binomial name
- Foulehaio carunculatus (Gmelin, JF, 1788)

= Polynesian wattled honeyeater =

Species of bird

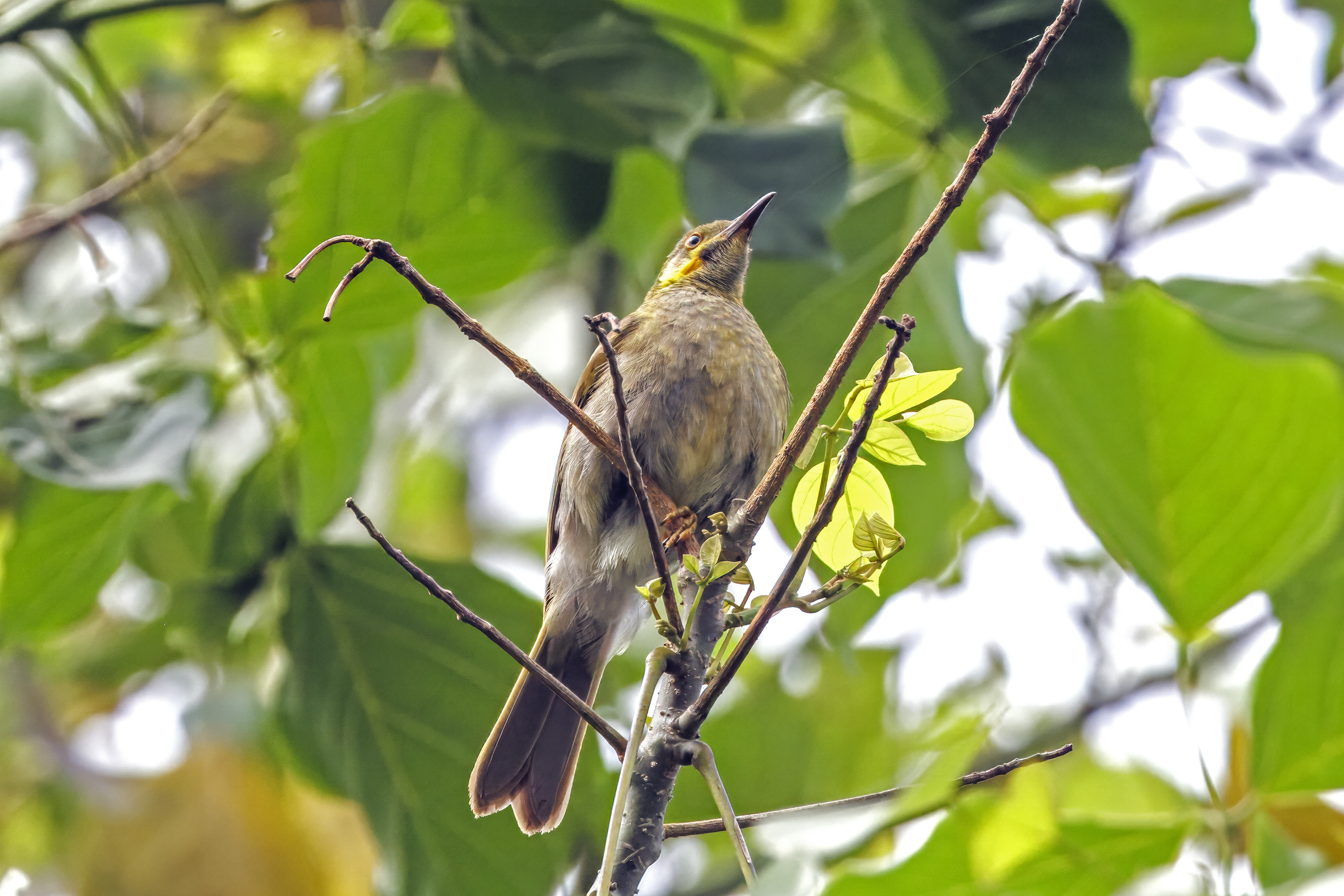

The Polynesian wattled honeyeater (Foulehaio carunculatus) or the eastern wattled honeyeater, is a species of bird in the honeyeater family Meliphagidae. It was considered conspecific with the Fiji wattled honeyeater and the kikau.

The species is endemic to the islands of the Central Pacific, occurring on American Samoa, Fiji, Samoa, Tonga, and Wallis and Futuna Islands. Its natural habitats are tropical moist lowland forests, tropical mangrove forests, and tropical moist montane forest.

== Taxonomy ==
The Polynesian wattled honeyeater was formally described in 1788 by the German naturalist Johann Friedrich Gmelin in his revised and expanded edition of Carl Linnaeus's Systema Naturae. He placed it with the treecreepers in the genus Certhia and coined the binomial name Certhia carunculata. The specific epithet is from Latin caruncula meaning "a small piece of flesh" and hence wattled. Gmelin based his description on the "wattled creeper" that had been described in 1782 by the English ornithologist John Latham in his book A General Synopsis of Birds. Latham had examined a specimen from Tonga in the collection of the Leverian Museum in London. The Polynesian wattled honeyeater is now one of three honeyeaters placed in the genus Foulehaio that was introduced in 1852 by the German naturalist Ludwig Reichenbach. The species is monotypic: no subspecies are recognised.

The Polynesian wattled honeyeater was formerly considered to be conspecific with the Fiji wattled honeyeater (Foulehaio taviunensis) and the kikau (Foulehaio procerior). The species were split based on the results of molecular phylogenetic study published in 2014.
