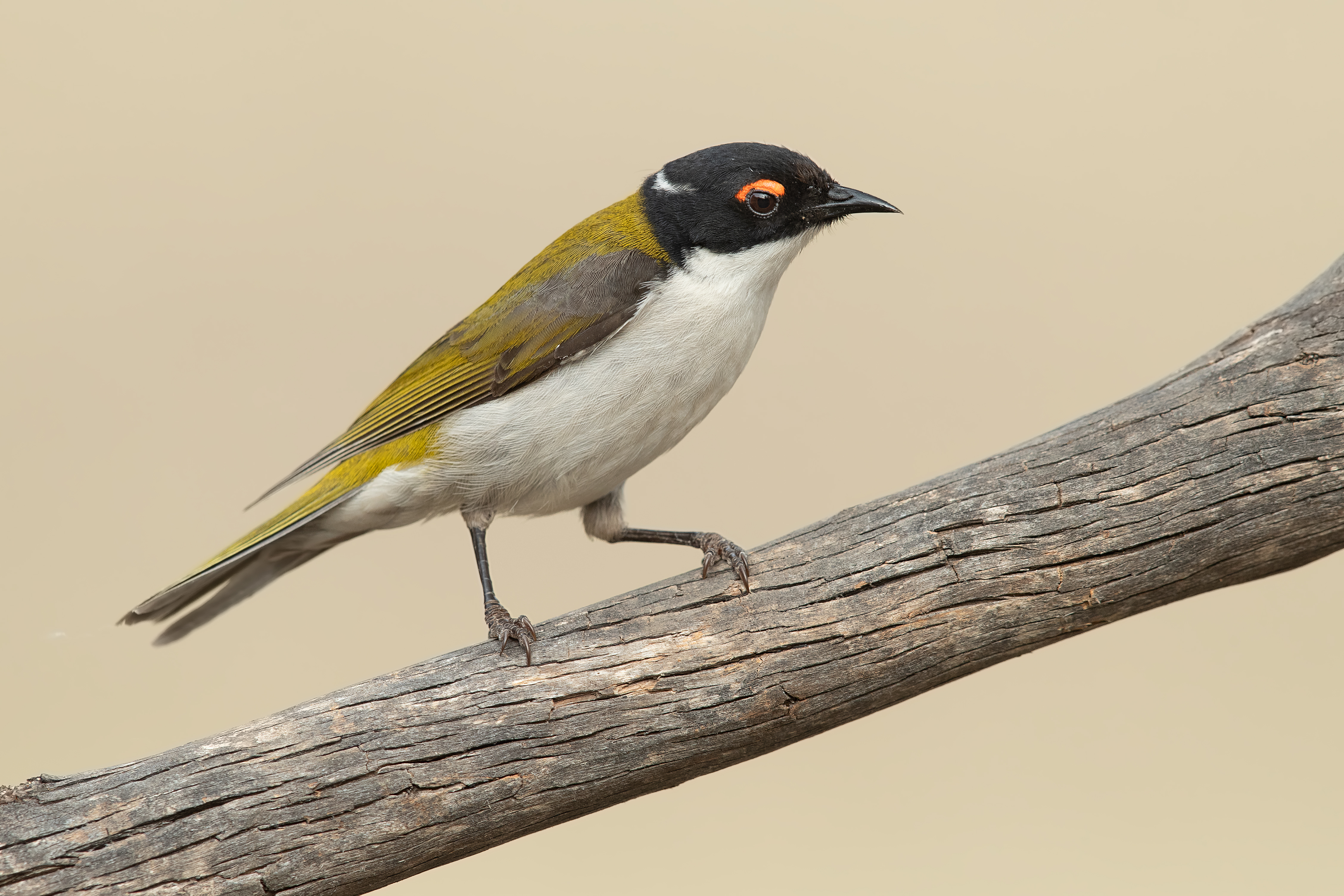

Conservation status
- Least Concern (IUCN 3.1)

Scientific classification
- Kingdom: Animalia
- Phylum: Chordata
- Class: Aves
- Order: Passeriformes
- Family: Meliphagidae
- Genus: Melithreptus
- Species: M. lunatus

Binomial name
- Melithreptus lunatus (Vieillot, 1802)

= White-naped honeyeater =

Species of bird

The white-naped honeyeater (Melithreptus lunatus) is a passerine bird of the honeyeater family Meliphagidae native to eastern Australia. Birds from southwestern Australia have been shown to be a distinct species, Gilbert's honeyeater, and the eastern birds are more closely related to the black-headed honeyeater of Tasmania. One of several similar species of black-headed honeyeaters in the genus Melithreptus, it dwells in dry sclerophyll eucalypt woodland. Its diet consists of nectar from various flowers, and it also feeds on insects.

== Taxonomy ==
The white-naped honeyeater was originally described as Certhia lunata by French ornithologist Louis Pierre Vieillot in 1802. The specific epithet is derived from the Latin luna, meaning 'moon'; this refers to the crescent-shaped, white marking on its nape. It is a member of the genus Melithreptus, with several species of similar size and (apart from the brown-headed honeyeater) black-headed appearance, in the honeyeater family, Meliphagidae. The next closest relative outside the genus is the much larger, but similarly marked, blue-faced honeyeater. More recently, DNA analysis has shown honeyeaters to be related to the Pardalotidae (pardalotes), Acanthizidae (Australian warblers, scrubwrens, thornbills, etc.), and the Maluridae (Australian fairy-wrens) in the large superfamily Meliphagoidea.

Gilbert's honeyeater, found in southwest Western Australia, was initially described as a separate species by John Gould in 1844, before being reclassified as a subspecies of the white-naped for many years. However, a molecular study published in 2010 showed that it had diverged before the split of populations in eastern Australia into the white-naped and black-headed honeyeaters.

"White-naped honeyeater" has been designated as the official common name for the species by the International Ornithologists' Union (IOC).

== Description ==
Drinking by the water's edge, SE Queensland

A mid-sized honeyeater at 13–15 cm (5–6 in) in length, it is olive-green above and white below, with a black head, nape and throat, a red patch over the eye, and a white crescent-shaped patch on the nape. It is thinner than other similar species. Juveniles have brownish crowns and an orange base of the bill. Its call is a mjerp mjerp.

== Ecology ==
It is found in eucalypt forest and woodlands. Its diet is principally nectar from a variety of flowers, supplemented by insects and various other invertebrates.

White-naped honeyeaters may nest from July to December, breeding once or twice during this time. The nest is a thick-walled bowl of grasses and bits of bark in the fork of a tall tree, usually a eucalypt. Two or three eggs are laid, 18 mm × 14 mm (0.71 in × 0.55 in) in size, and shiny, buff-pink, sparsely spotted with red-brown.
