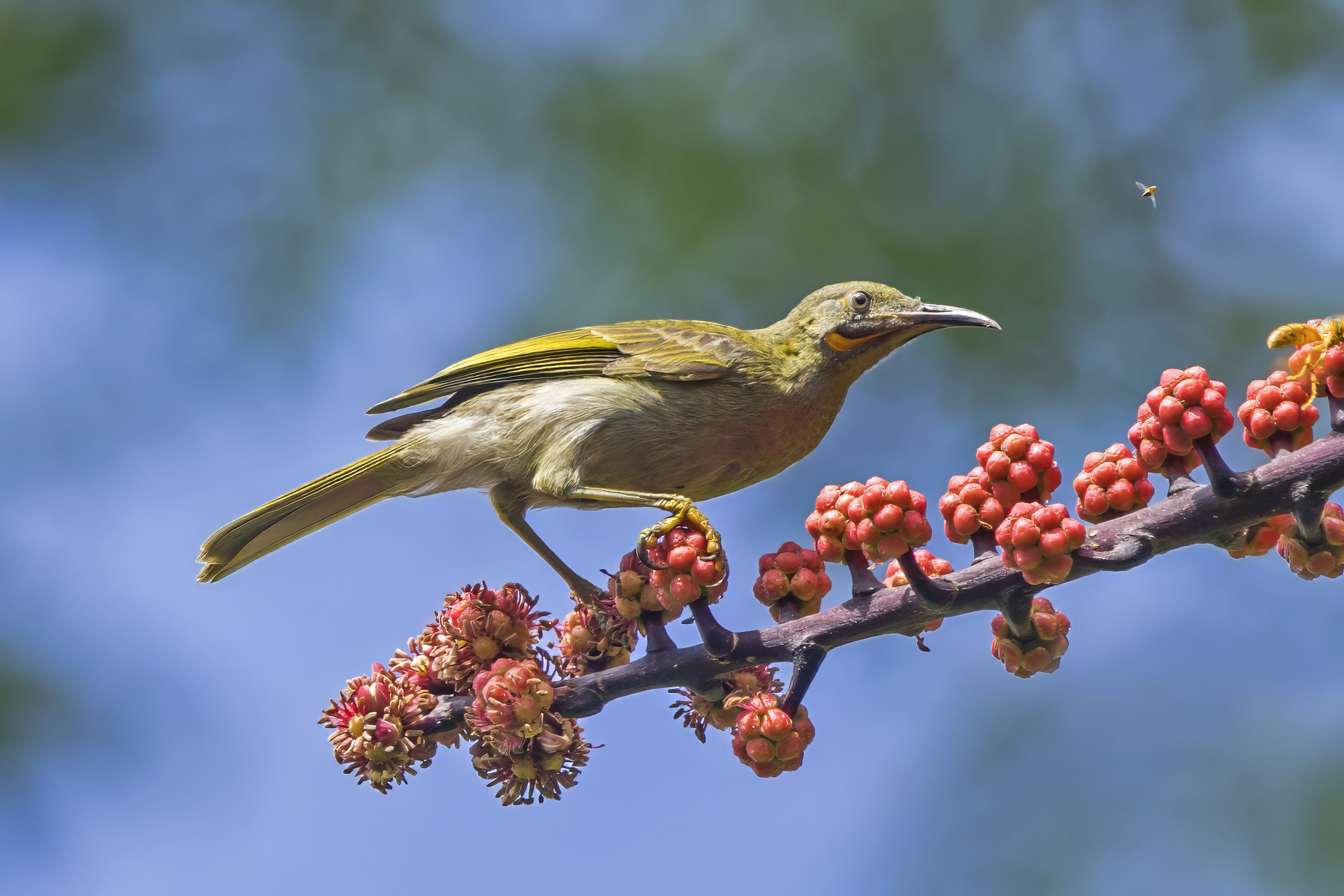
- Close to Colo-i-Suva Forest Reserve, Viti Levu, Fiji

Conservation status
- Least Concern (IUCN 3.1)

Scientific classification
- Kingdom: Animalia
- Phylum: Chordata
- Class: Aves
- Order: Passeriformes
- Family: Meliphagidae
- Genus: Foulehaio
- Species: F. procerior

Binomial name
- Foulehaio procerior (Finsch & Hartlaub, 1867)

= Kikau =

Species of bird

The kikau or western wattled honeyeater (Foulehaio procerior) is a species of bird in the honeyeater family Meliphagidae. It was considered conspecific with the Fiji wattled honeyeater and the Polynesian wattled honeyeater.

The species is endemic to Viti Levu, Ovalau and the islands of the Yasawa Archipelago in Fiji. Its natural habitats are tropical moist lowland forests, tropical mangrove forests, and tropical moist montane forest.
