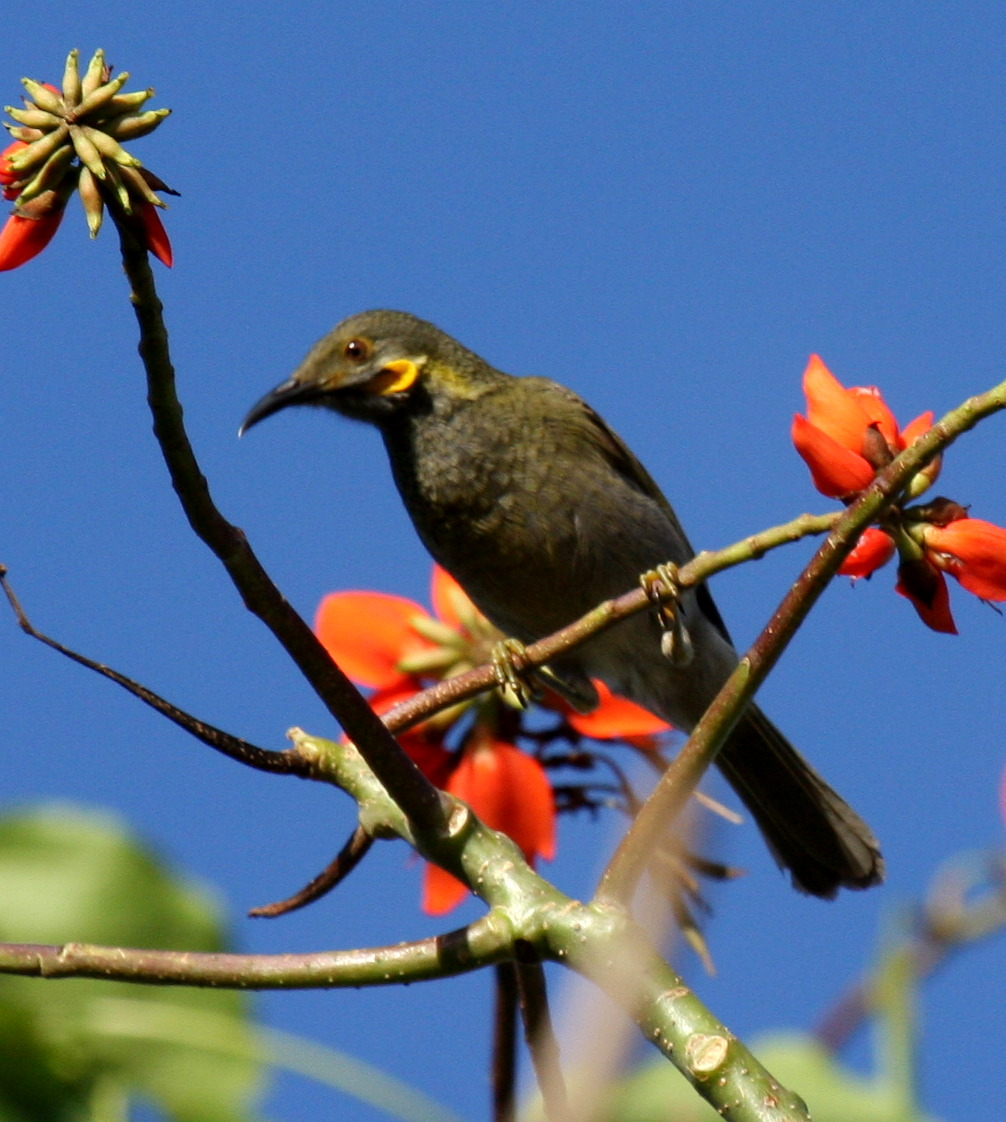

Conservation status
- Least Concern (IUCN 3.1)

Scientific classification
- Kingdom: Animalia
- Phylum: Chordata
- Class: Aves
- Order: Passeriformes
- Family: Meliphagidae
- Genus: Foulehaio
- Species: F. taviunensis

Binomial name
- Foulehaio taviunensis (Wiglesworth, 1891)

= Fiji wattled honeyeater =

Species of bird

The Fiji wattled honeyeater (Foulehaio taviunensis) or northern wattled honeyeater, is a species of bird in the honeyeater family Meliphagidae. It was considered conspecific with the Polynesian wattled honeyeater and the kikau.

The species is endemic to Fiji. Its natural habitats are tropical moist lowland forests, tropical mangrove forests, and tropical moist montane forest.
