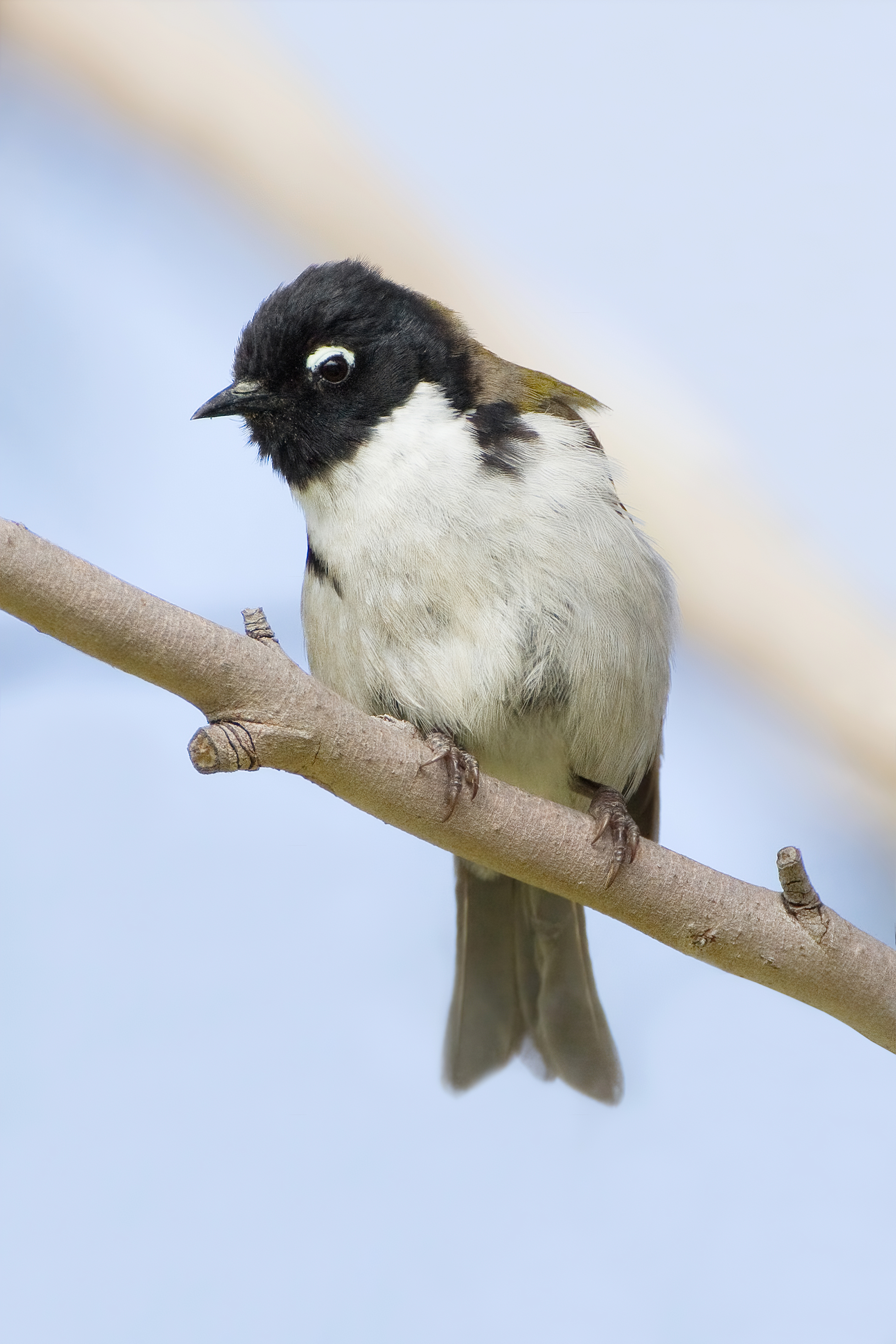

Conservation status
- Least Concern (IUCN 3.1)

Scientific classification
- Kingdom: Animalia
- Phylum: Chordata
- Class: Aves
- Order: Passeriformes
- Family: Meliphagidae
- Genus: Melithreptus
- Species: M. affinis

Binomial name
- Melithreptus affinis (Lesson, 1839)
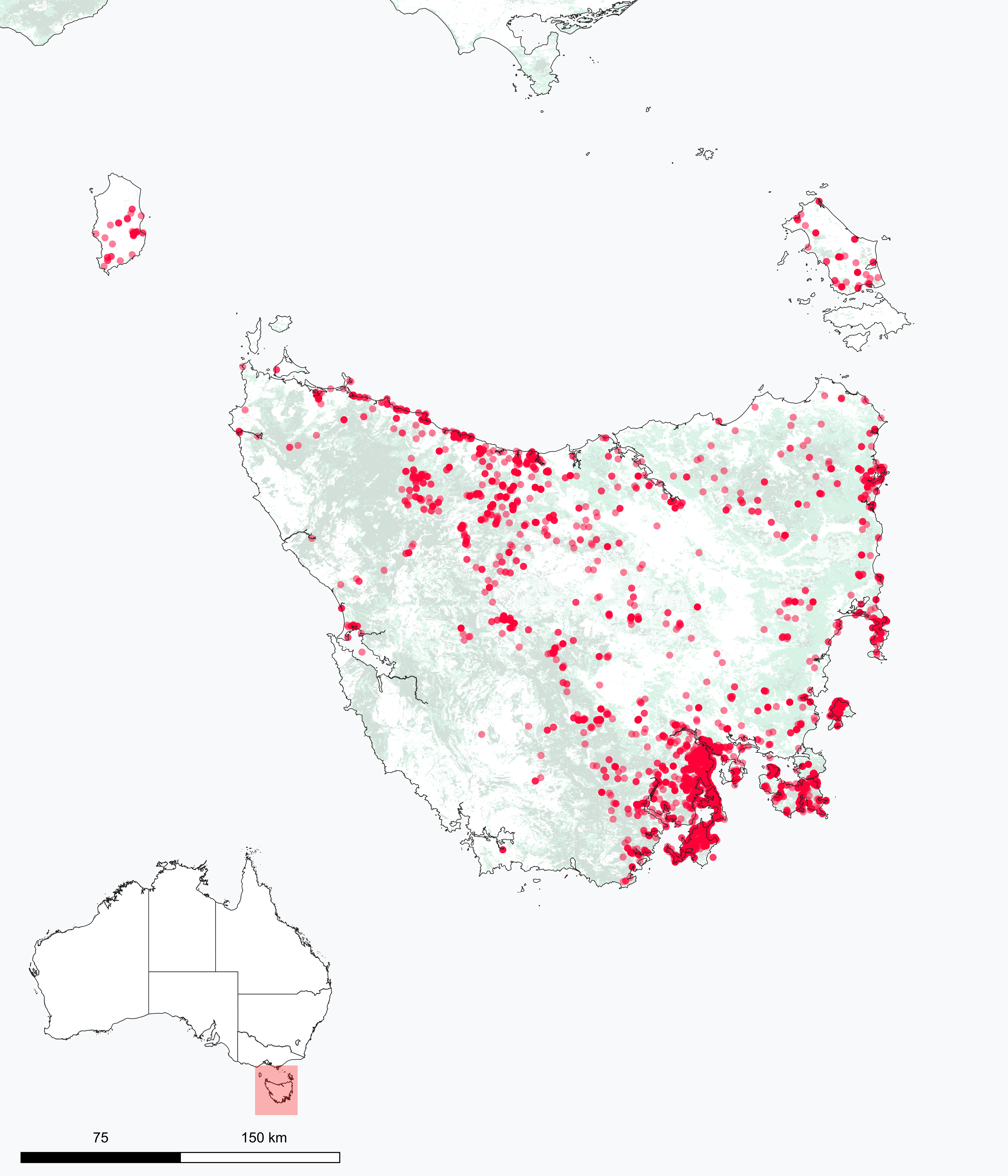

= Black-headed honeyeater =

Species of bird

The black-headed honeyeater (Melithreptus affinis) is a species of bird in the family Meliphagidae. It is one of two members of the genus Melithreptus endemic to Tasmania. Its natural habitats are temperate forest and Mediterranean-type shrubby vegetation. Despite its name, the black-headed honeyeater eats predominantly insects.

== Taxonomy ==
The black-headed honeyeater was described in 1839 as Eidopsarus affinis. John Gould described it as Melithreptus melanocephalus in 1844, likely unaware of its earlier name.

Molecular studies show that the black-headed honeyeater is most closely related to the white-naped honeyeater, and that their next closest relative is Gilbert's honeyeater. All are members of the genus Melithreptus, with several species of similar size and (apart from the brown-headed honeyeater) black-headed appearance, in the honeyeater family, Meliphagidae. The next closest relative outside the genus is the much larger, but similarly marked, blue-faced honeyeater. More recently, DNA analysis has shown honeyeaters to be related to the Pardalotidae (pardalotes), Acanthizidae (Australian warblers, scrubwrens, thornbills, etc.), and the Maluridae (Australian fairywrens) in the large superfamily Meliphagoidea.

== Description ==
A mid-sized honeyeater, it is olive-green above and white below, with a wholly black head that lacks the white nape of its relatives. It has a blue-white patch of bare skin around the eye. Its beak is small.

== Distribution and habitat ==
The black-headed honeyeater is endemic to Tasmania as well as King Island and the Furneaux Group, where it inhabits wet and dry sclerophyll forests, as well as scrub and heathland, and subalpine habitats to an altitude of 1200 m (4000 ft).

== Feeding ==
Insects and spiders form the bulk of the diet along with flower nectar. The black-headed honeyeater specialises in foraging among the foliage of trees, as opposed to probing the trunk for prey, which is practised by its relative the strong-billed honeyeater, and consequently the two species rarely overlap. Birds often hang upside down from branches while foraging.

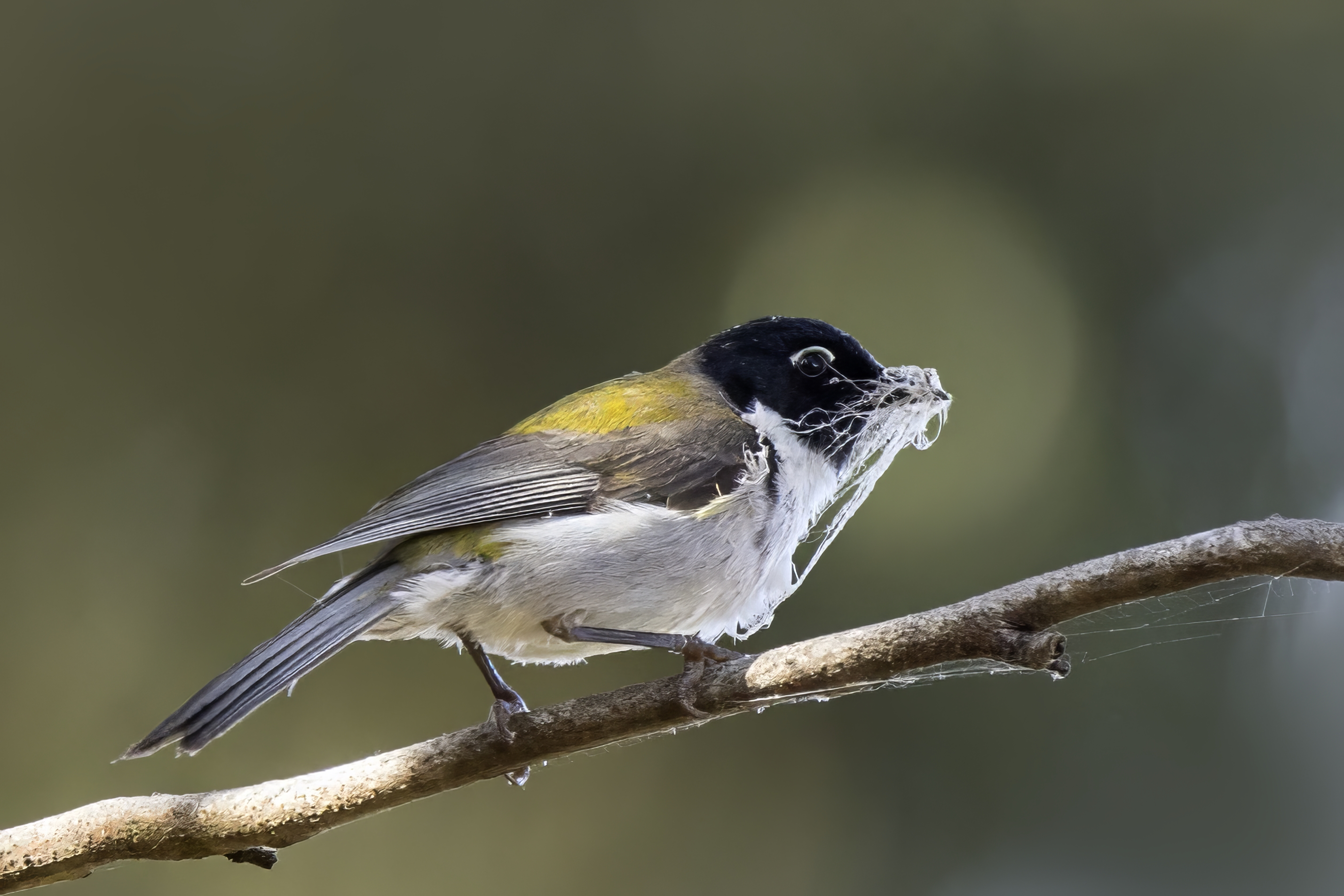
collecting spider webbing

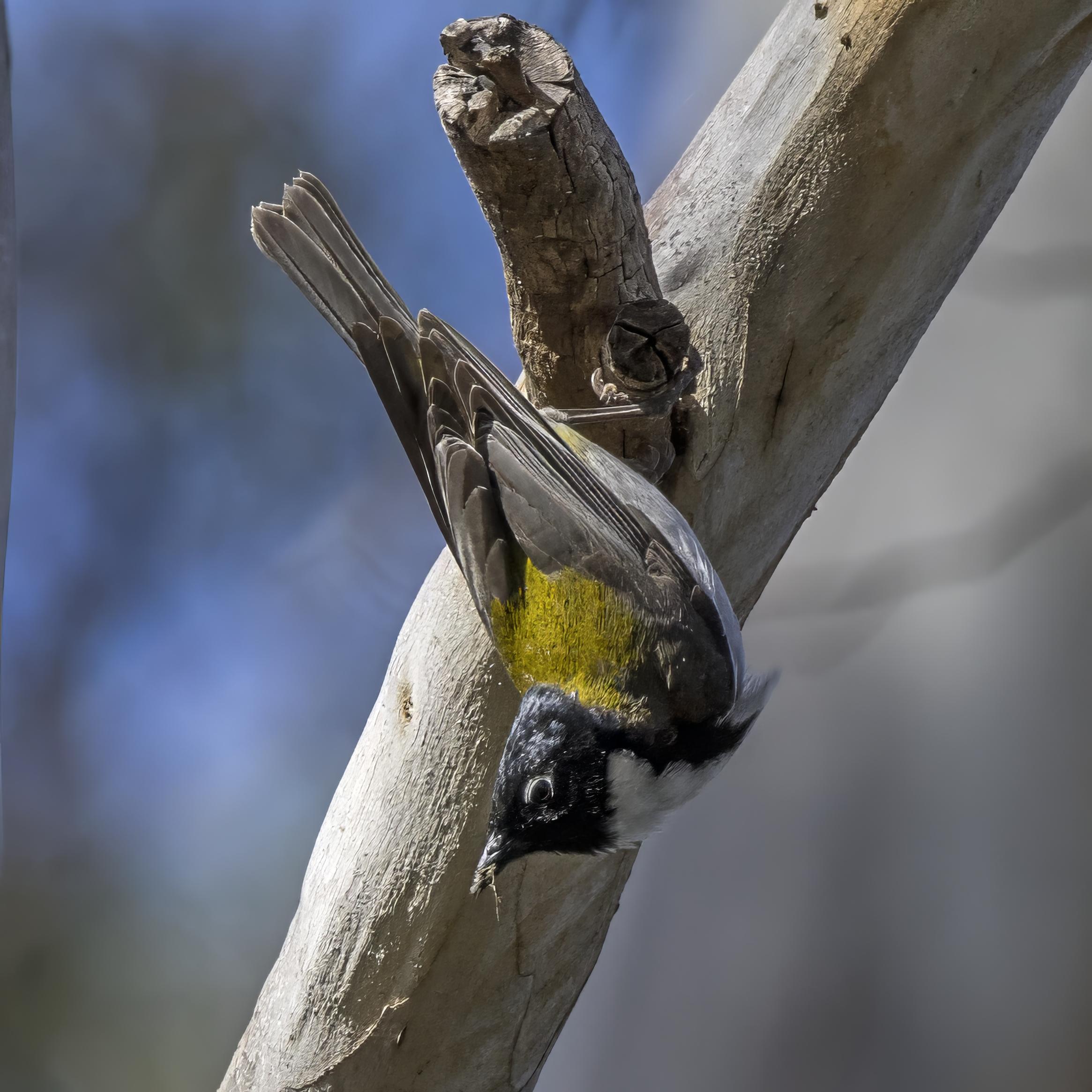
typical foraging position
