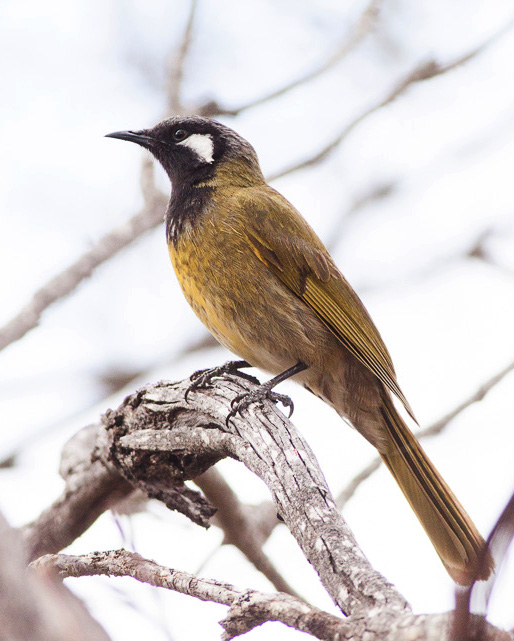
- Nesoptilotis leucotis (white-eared honeyeater)

Scientific classification
- Kingdom: Animalia
- Phylum: Chordata
- Class: Aves
- Order: Passeriformes
- Family: Meliphagidae
- Genus: Nesoptilotis; Mathews, 1913

Type species
- Ptilotis flavigula Gould, 1838

= Nesoptilotis =

Genus of birds

Nesoptilotis is a genus of honeyeaters endemic to Australia and Tasmania. The genus consists of two former members of Lichenostomus, and was created after a molecular phylogenetic analysis published in 2011 showed that the original genus was polyphyletic.

The genus contains two species:

Image	Scientific name	Common name	Distribution
	N. flavicollis	Yellow-throated honeyeater	Tasmania
	N. leucotis	White-eared honeyeater	southwest, south and east Australia

The name Nesoptilotis was first proposed by the Australian ornithologist Gregory Mathews in 1913. The word is derived from the Greek nēsos island (i.e. Tasmania), ptilon feather and -ōtis eared.
