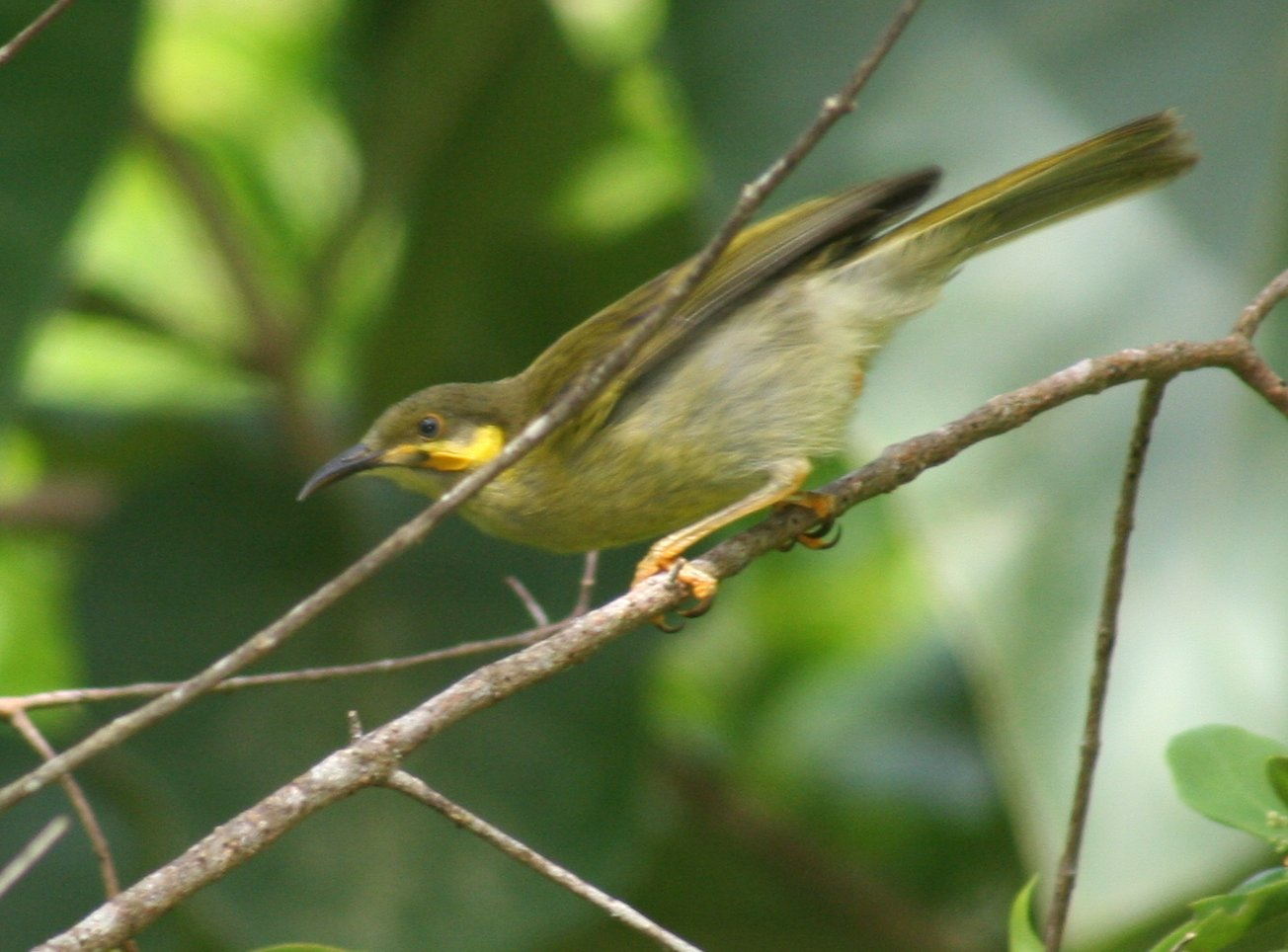
- Polynesian wattled honeyeater (Foulehaio carunculatus)

Scientific classification
- Kingdom: Animalia
- Phylum: Chordata
- Class: Aves
- Order: Passeriformes
- Family: Meliphagidae
- Genus: Foulehaio; Reichenbach, 1852

Type species
- Philemon musicus = Certhia carunculata Vieillot, 1826

Species
- 3 recognized species, see article.

= Wattled honeyeater =

Genus of birds

The wattled honeyeaters form a genus, Foulehaio, of birds in the honeyeater family Meliphagidae.

== Taxonomy ==
The genus Foulehaio was introduced in 1852 by the German naturalist Ludwig Reichenbach to accommodate a single species, the Polynesian wattled honeyeater, which is therefore considered as the type species. The genus name is from the word in the Tongan language Foulehaio, Fuoulehaoi or Fulehau for the Polynesian wattled honeyeater. The word had been used for the Polynesian wattled honeyeater by Jean-Baptiste Audebert and Louis Pierre Vieillot in 1802.

The genus contains three species:

Image	Scientific name	Common name	Distribution
	Foulehaio carunculatus	Polynesian wattled honeyeater	American Samoa, Fiji, Samoa, Tonga, and Wallis and Futuna Islands
	Foulehaio taviunensis	Fiji wattled honeyeater	Fiji
	Foulehaio procerior	Kikau	Fiji
