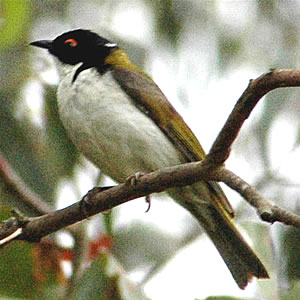
- White-naped honeyeater (Melithreptus lunatus)

Scientific classification
- Kingdom: Animalia
- Phylum: Chordata
- Class: Aves
- Order: Passeriformes
- Family: Meliphagidae
- Genus: Melithreptus; Vieillot, 1816

Type species
- Certhia lunata Vieillot, 1802

= Melithreptus =

Genus of birds

Melithreptus is a genus of bird in the honeyeater family Meliphagidae. Its members are native to Australia. It is generally considered to contain seven species, although some authors have classified the related blue-faced honeyeater within this genus.

== Taxonomy ==
The genus Melithreptus was introduced in 1816 by the French ornithologist Louis Vieillot. Vieillot listed two species in the genus but did not specify a type. In 1884 the German born ornithologist Hans Friedrich Gadow designated the type as Certhia lunata Vieillot, 1802, the white-naped honeyeater. The name Melithreptus is from the Ancient Greek μελιθρεπτος/melithreptos meaning "honey-fed" which combines μελι/meli, μελιτος/melitos meaning "honey" with θρεπτα/threpta meaning "feeding".

It has been further subdivided into two subgenera, Melithreptus and Eidopsarus based on foraging habits. Those of the former subgenus forage for insects in foliage or canopy, congregate in larger flocks, and are found in more open dry sclerophyll forests. They also have smaller feet and a less prominent or missing nuchal bar. Members of the subgenus Eidopsarus forage by probing for insects in bark of tree trunks and branches, generally in eucalypt forest and rainforest, and travel in small family groups. They have sturdier legs and feet and a more prominent nuchal band.

Biologist Allen Keast studied the genus extensively across Australia, and noted that a member of each group were found together in many parts of the country, with the trunk-foraging species averaging 10% larger - thus the smaller lunatus occurs with the larger gularis, and this is most exaggerated in Tasmania, where the difference between affinis and validirostris is even more marked. Keast proposed that the two species were diversifying into other niches in the absence of other mainland trunk-feeding species, shriketits, treecreepers and sittella, in the case of validirostris, and smaller species with affinis. Furthermore, the bill of the shorter-billed taxon in areas where the trunk feeder was absent grew longer, as chloropsis did in Western Australia.

Molecular markers show genus split from the ancestors of the blue-faced honeyeater somewhere between 12.8 and 6.4 million years ago in the Miocene epoch. That species differs from them in its much larger size, brighter plumage and more gregarious nature and larger patch of bare facial skin.

The white-throated honeyeater split off between 9 and 5 million years ago, independently of the other three members of the subgenus Melithreptus.

The strong-billed honeyeater separated from the other members of Eidopsarus between 6.7 and 3.4 million years ago.

Classically, six species have been recognised, but evidence published in 2010 confirms the distinct status of Gilbert's honeyeater. In former years, the golden-backed honeyeater (M. laetior) of northern Australia was considered distinct, but it has a broad band of overlap (with intermediate forms) with the black-chinned honeyeater and is hence considered a subspecies of it.

== Species ==
The genus contains seven species:

Subgenus	Image	Common name	Scientific name	Distribution
Melithreptus		Black-headed honeyeater	Melithreptus affinis	Tasmania
Melithreptus		White-naped honeyeater	Melithreptus lunatus	eastern Australia
Melithreptus		Gilbert's honeyeater	Melithreptus chloropsis	Western Australia
Melithreptus		White-throated honeyeater	Melithreptus albogularis	New Guinea and eastern and northern Australia.
Eidopsarus		Brown-headed honeyeater	Melithreptus brevirostris	Australia.
Eidopsarus		Black-chinned honeyeater	Melithreptus gularis	Australia
Eidopsarus		Strong-billed honeyeater	Melithreptus validirostris	Tasmania
