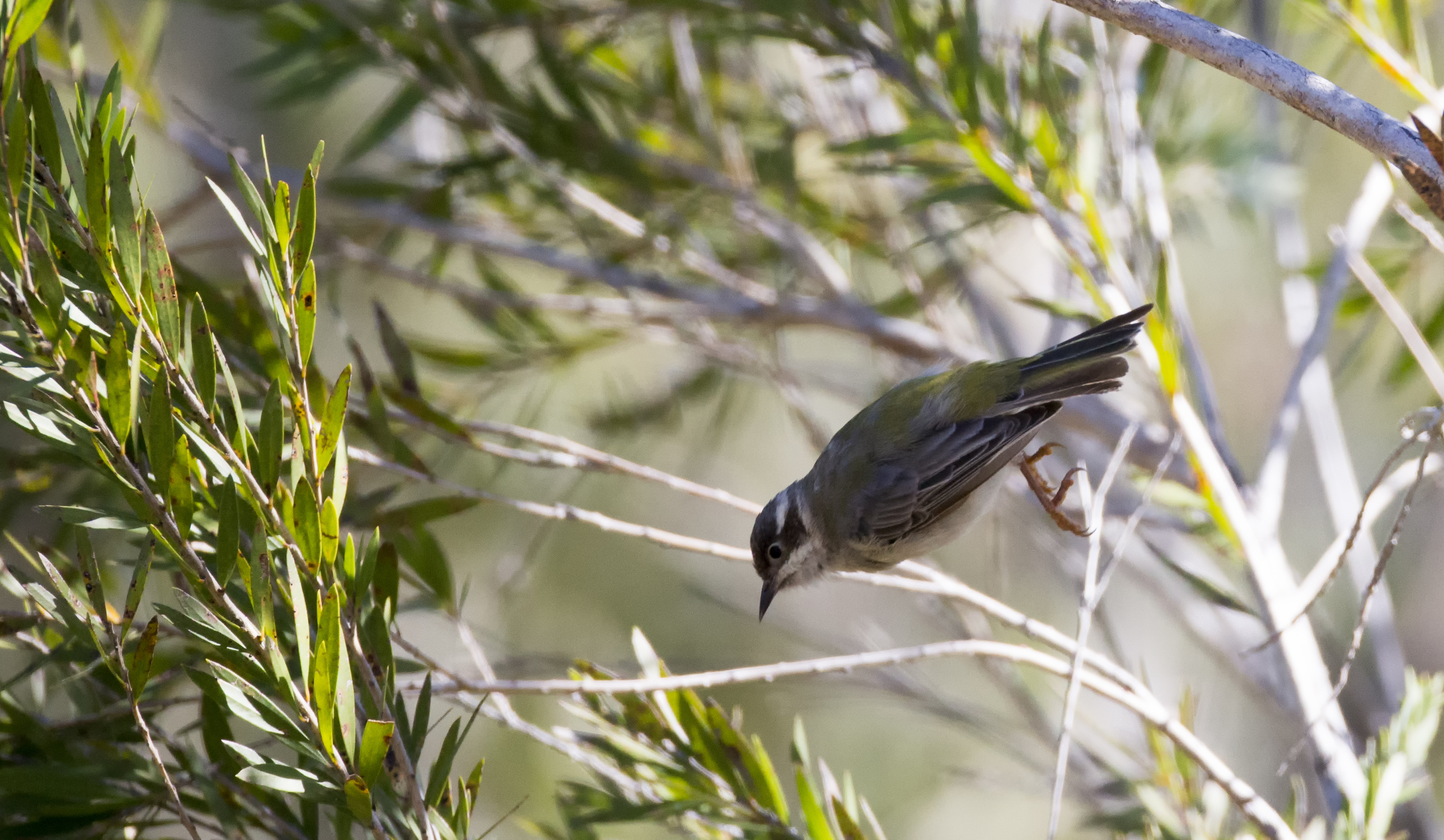

Conservation status
- Least Concern (IUCN 3.1)

Scientific classification
- Kingdom: Animalia
- Phylum: Chordata
- Class: Aves
- Order: Passeriformes
- Family: Meliphagidae
- Genus: Melithreptus
- Species: M. brevirostris

Binomial name
- Melithreptus brevirostris (Vigors & Horsfield, 1827)
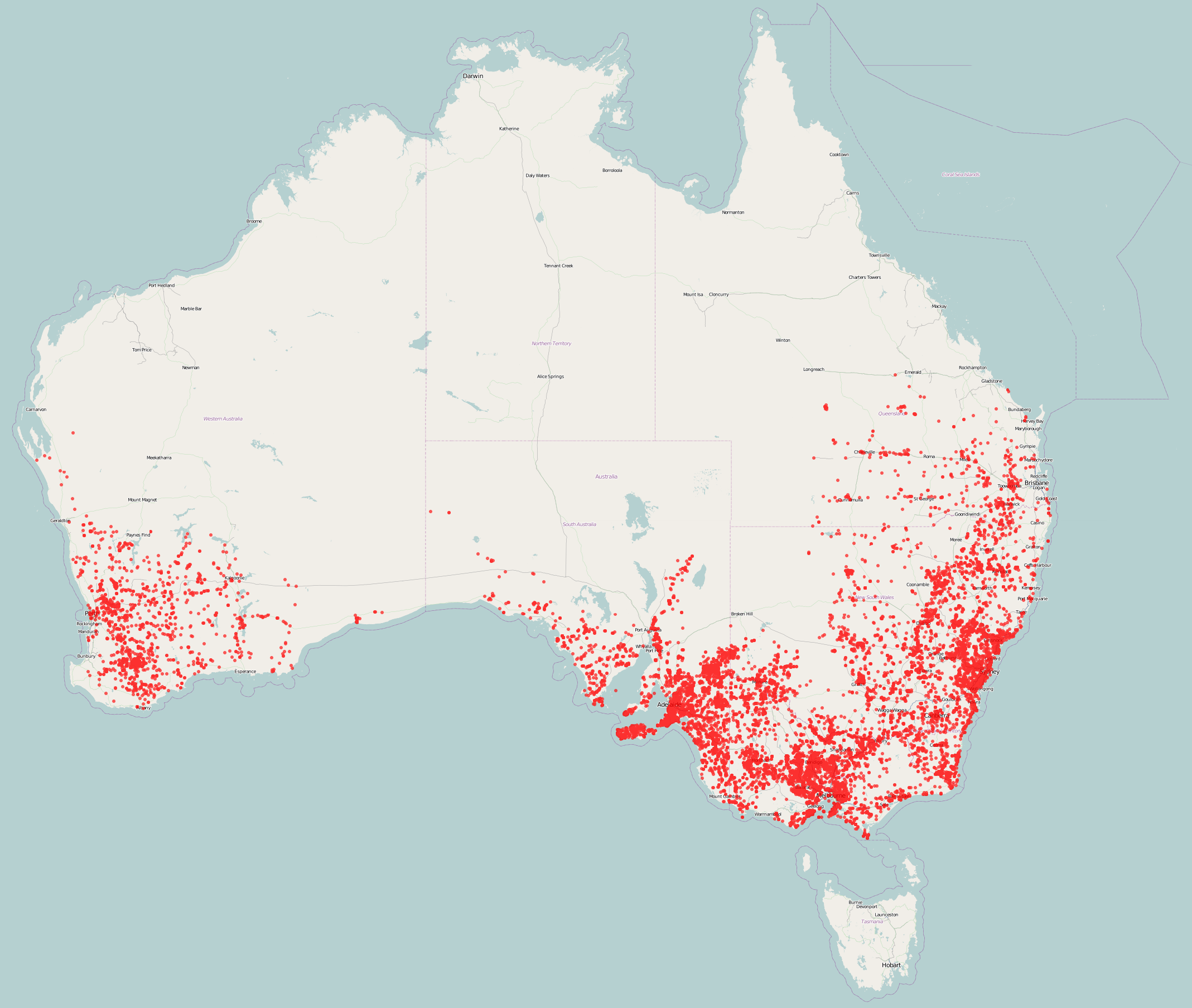
- Distribution of the brown-headed honeyeater. Adapted from Atlas of Living Australia Data

= Brown-headed honeyeater =

Species of bird

The brown-headed honeyeater (Melithreptus brevirostris) is a species of passerine bird in the family Meliphagidae. It is endemic to Australia. Its natural habitats are temperate forests and Mediterranean-type shrubby vegetation.

== Taxonomy ==
The brown-headed honeyeater was first described by Vigors & Horsfield in 1827. Its species name is derived from the Latin terms brevis 'short', and rostrum 'beak'. Five subspecies have been described. The race magnirostris from Kangaroo Island has a noticeably larger bill.

It is a member of the genus Melithreptus, with several species of similar size and all black-headed, apart from this species, in the honeyeater family Meliphagidae. Molecular markers show the brown-headed honeyeater is most closely related to the black-chinned honeyeater, with the strong-billed honeyeater an earlier offshoot between 6.7 and 3.4 million years ago.

== Description ==
A small honeyeater ranging from 13 to 15 cm (5.2–6 in) in length, it is olive-brown above and buff below, with a brown head, nape and throat, a cream or orange patch of bare skin over the eye, and a dull white crescent-shaped patch on the nape. The legs and feet are orange. It makes a scratchy chwik-chwik-chwik call.

== Distribution ==
The brown-headed honeyeater ranges from central-southern Queensland, down through central and eastern New South Wales (though generally west of the Great Dividing Range), across Victoria and into eastern South Australia, where it is found in the Flinders Ranges, around the lower Murray River region, and also on the Eyre Peninsula. A subspecies M. b. leucogenys occurs in south-western Western Australia.

== Diet ==
Insects form the bulk of the diet, and like its close relatives, the black-chinned and strong-billed honeyeaters, the brown-headed honeyeater forages by probing in the bark of trunks and branches of trees.

== Breeding ==
Brown-headed honeyeaters may nest from July to December, breeding once or twice during this time. The nest is a thick-walled bowl of grasses and bits of bark, lined with softer plant material, hidden in the outer foliage of a tall tree, usually a eucalypt. Two or three eggs are laid, 16 x 13 mm in size, and shiny, buff-pink, sparsely spotted with red-brown (more so on the larger end).
