= List of ovenbird species =

Ovenbirds is the common name for the avian family Furnariidae, though none of its members bear that name. The common name derives from the horneros, which itself derives from the Spanish word for oven, horno, used to describe the shape of their nests. (Eight species do have the English name "hornero".) The International Ornithological Committee (IOC) recognizes these 321 species in the family, distributed among 71 genera. Two species, the cryptic treehunter and the Alagoas foliage-gleaner, are extinct.

This list is presented according to the IOC taxonomic sequence and can also be sorted alphabetically by common name and binomial.

Common name	Binomial name + authority	IOC sequence
Tawny-throated leaftosser	Sclerurus mexicanus Sclater, PL, 1857	1
Dusky leaftosser	Sclerurus obscurior Hartert, EJO, 1901	2
Short-billed leaftosser	Sclerurus rufigularis Pelzeln, 1868	3
Scaly-throated leaftosser	Sclerurus guatemalensis (Hartlaub, 1844)	4
Black-tailed leaftosser	Sclerurus caudacutus (Vieillot, 1816)	5
Grey-throated leaftosser	Sclerurus albigularis Sclater, PL & Salvin, 1869	6
Rufous-breasted leaftosser	Sclerurus scansor (Ménétriés, 1835)	7
Coastal miner	Geositta peruviana Lafresnaye, 1847	8
Slender-billed miner	Geositta tenuirostris (Lafresnaye, 1836)	9
Common miner	Geositta cunicularia (Vieillot, 1816)	10
Puna miner	Geositta punensis Dabbene, 1917	11
Campo miner	Geositta poeciloptera (Wied-Neuwied, M, 1830)	12
Thick-billed miner	Geositta crassirostris Sclater, PL, 1866	13
Rufous-banded miner	Geositta rufipennis (Burmeister, 1860)	14
Greyish miner	Geositta maritima (d'Orbigny & Lafresnaye, 1837)	15
Short-billed miner	Geositta antarctica Landbeck, 1880	16
Dark-winged miner	Geositta saxicolina Taczanowski, 1875	17
Creamy-rumped miner	Geositta isabellina (Philippi & Landbeck, 1864)	18
Spot-throated woodcreeper	Certhiasomus stictolaemus (Pelzeln, 1868)	19
Olivaceous woodcreeper	Sittasomus griseicapillus (Vieillot, 1818)	20
Little long-tailed woodcreeper	Deconychura typica Cherrie, 1891	21
Northern long-tailed woodcreeper	Deconychura longicauda (Pelzeln, 1868)	22
Southern long-tailed woodcreeper	Deconychura pallida Zimmer, JT, 1929	23
Tyrannine woodcreeper	Dendrocincla tyrannina (Lafresnaye, 1851)	24
White-chinned woodcreeper	Dendrocincla merula (Lichtenstein, MHC, 1820)	25
Ruddy woodcreeper	Dendrocincla homochroa (Sclater, PL, 1860)	26
Tawny-winged woodcreeper	Dendrocincla anabatina Sclater, PL, 1859	27
Plain-brown woodcreeper	Dendrocincla fuliginosa (Vieillot, 1818)	28
Plain-winged woodcreeper	Dendrocincla turdina (Lichtenstein, MHC, 1820)	29
Wedge-billed woodcreeper	Glyphorynchus spirurus (Vieillot, 1819)	30
Cinnamon-throated woodcreeper	Dendrexetastes rufigula (Lesson, RP, 1844)	31
Long-billed woodcreeper	Nasica longirostris (Vieillot, 1818)	32
Northern barred woodcreeper	Dendrocolaptes sanctithomae (Lafresnaye, 1852)	33
Amazonian barred woodcreeper	Dendrocolaptes certhia (Boddaert, 1783)	34
Black-banded woodcreeper	Dendrocolaptes picumnus Lichtenstein, MHC, 1820	35
Hoffmanns's woodcreeper	Dendrocolaptes hoffmannsi Hellmayr, 1909	36
Planalto woodcreeper	Dendrocolaptes platyrostris Spix, 1824	37
Bar-bellied woodcreeper	Hylexetastes stresemanni Snethlage, E, 1925	38
Red-billed woodcreeper	Hylexetastes perrotii (Lafresnaye, 1844)	39
Uniform woodcreeper	Hylexetastes uniformis Hellmayr, 1909	40
Strong-billed woodcreeper	Xiphocolaptes promeropirhynchus (Lesson, RP, 1840)	41
Moustached woodcreeper	Xiphocolaptes falcirostris (Spix, 1824)	42
White-throated woodcreeper	Xiphocolaptes albicollis (Vieillot, 1818)	43
Great rufous woodcreeper	Xiphocolaptes major (Vieillot, 1818)	44
Striped woodcreeper	Xiphorhynchus obsoletus (Lichtenstein, MHC, 1820)	45
Lesser woodcreeper	Xiphorhynchus fuscus (Vieillot, 1818)	46
Ceara woodcreeper	Xiphorhynchus atlanticus (Cory, 1916)	47
Chestnut-rumped woodcreeper	Xiphorhynchus pardalotus (Vieillot, 1818)	48
Ocellated woodcreeper	Xiphorhynchus ocellatus (Spix, 1824)	49
Elegant woodcreeper	Xiphorhynchus elegans (Pelzeln, 1868)	50
Spix's woodcreeper	Xiphorhynchus spixii (Lesson, RP, 1830)	51
Buff-throated woodcreeper	Xiphorhynchus guttatus (Lichtenstein, MHC, 1820)	52
Cocoa woodcreeper	Xiphorhynchus susurrans (Jardine, 1847)	53
Ivory-billed woodcreeper	Xiphorhynchus flavigaster Swainson, 1827	54
Black-striped woodcreeper	Xiphorhynchus lachrymosus (Lawrence, 1862)	55
Spotted woodcreeper	Xiphorhynchus erythropygius (Sclater, PL, 1860)	56
Olive-backed woodcreeper	Xiphorhynchus triangularis (Lafresnaye, 1842)	57
Straight-billed woodcreeper	Dendroplex picus (Gmelin, JF, 1788)	58
Zimmer's woodcreeper	Dendroplex kienerii (des Murs, 1856)	59
Red-billed scythebill	Campylorhamphus trochilirostris (Lichtenstein, MHC, 1820)	60
Black-billed scythebill	Campylorhamphus falcularius (Vieillot, 1822)	61
Curve-billed scythebill	Campylorhamphus procurvoides (Lafresnaye, 1850)	62
Tapajos scythebill	Campylorhamphus probatus Zimmer, JT, 1934	63
Xingu scythebill	Campylorhamphus multostriatus (Snethlage, E, 1907)	64
Brown-billed scythebill	Campylorhamphus pusillus (Sclater, PL, 1860)	65
Greater scythebill	Drymotoxeres pucheranii (Lafresnaye, 1849)	66
Scimitar-billed woodcreeper	Drymornis bridgesii (Eyton, 1849)	67
White-striped woodcreeper	Lepidocolaptes leucogaster (Swainson, 1827)	68
Streak-headed woodcreeper	Lepidocolaptes souleyetii (Lafresnaye, 1849)	69
Narrow-billed woodcreeper	Lepidocolaptes angustirostris (Vieillot, 1818)	70
Spot-crowned woodcreeper	Lepidocolaptes affinis (Lafresnaye, 1839)	71
Montane woodcreeper	Lepidocolaptes lacrymiger (Lafresnaye, 1849)	72
Scaled woodcreeper	Lepidocolaptes squamatus (Lichtenstein, MHC, 1822)	73
Scalloped woodcreeper	Lepidocolaptes falcinellus (Cabanis & Heine, 1860)	74
Guianan woodcreeper	Lepidocolaptes albolineatus (Lafresnaye, 1846)	75
Duida woodcreeper	Lepidocolaptes duidae Zimmer, JT, 1934	76
Inambari woodcreeper	Lepidocolaptes fatimalimae Rodrigues, Aleixo, Whittaker & Naka, 2013	77
Dusky-capped woodcreeper	Lepidocolaptes fuscicapillus (Pelzeln, 1868)	78
Slender-billed xenops	Xenops tenuirostris Pelzeln, 1859	79
Northern plain xenops	Xenops mexicanus Sclater, PL, 1857	80
Amazonian plain xenops	Xenops genibarbis Illiger, 1811	81
Atlantic plain xenops	Xenops minutus (Sparrman, 1788)	82
Streaked xenops	Xenops rutilans Temminck, 1821	83
Point-tailed palmcreeper	Berlepschia rikeri (Ridgway, 1887)	84
Rufous-tailed xenops	Microxenops milleri Chapman, 1914	85
White-throated treerunner	Pygarrhichas albogularis (King, PP, 1831)	86
Straight-billed earthcreeper	Ochetorhynchus ruficaudus Meyen, 1834	87
Rock earthcreeper	Ochetorhynchus andaecola (d'Orbigny & Lafresnaye, 1838)	88
Band-tailed earthcreeper	Ochetorhynchus phoenicurus (Gould, 1839)	89
Crag chilia	Ochetorhynchus melanurus (Gray, GR, 1846)	90
Buffy tuftedcheek	Pseudocolaptes lawrencii Ridgway, 1878	91
Pacific tuftedcheek	Pseudocolaptes johnsoni Lönnberg & Rendahl, 1922	92
Streaked tuftedcheek	Pseudocolaptes boissonneautii (Lafresnaye, 1840)	93
Rusty-winged barbtail	Premnornis guttuliger (Sclater, PL, 1864)	94
Bolivian earthcreeper	Tarphonomus harterti (Berlepsch, 1892)	95
Chaco earthcreeper	Tarphonomus certhioides (d'Orbigny & Lafresnaye, 1838)	96
Band-tailed hornero	Furnarius figulus (Lichtenstein, MHC, 1823)	97
Pacific hornero	Furnarius cinnamomeus (Lesson, RP, 1844)	98
Caribbean hornero	Furnarius longirostris Pelzeln, 1856	99
Pale-legged hornero	Furnarius leucopus Swainson, 1838	100
Bay hornero	Furnarius torridus Sclater, PL & Salvin, 1866	101
Lesser hornero	Furnarius minor Pelzeln, 1858	102
Rufous hornero	Furnarius rufus (Gmelin, JF, 1788)	103
Crested hornero	Furnarius cristatus Burmeister, 1888	104
Sharp-tailed streamcreeper	Lochmias nematura (Lichtenstein, MHC, 1823)	105
Wren-like rushbird	Phleocryptes melanops (Vieillot, 1817)	106
Curve-billed reedhaunter	Limnornis curvirostris Gould, 1839	107
Striated earthcreeper	Geocerthia serrana (Taczanowski, 1875)	108
Scale-throated earthcreeper	Upucerthia dumetaria Geoffroy Saint-Hilaire, I, 1832	109
Patagonian forest earthcreeper	Upucerthia saturatior Scott, WED, 1900	110
White-throated earthcreeper	Upucerthia albigula Hellmayr, 1932	111
Buff-breasted earthcreeper	Upucerthia validirostris (Burmeister, 1861)	112
Long-tailed cinclodes	Cinclodes pabsti Sick, 1969	113
Blackish cinclodes	Cinclodes antarcticus (Garnot, 1826)	114
Buff-winged cinclodes	Cinclodes fuscus (Vieillot, 1818)	115
Cordoba cinclodes	Cinclodes comechingonus Zotta & Gavio, 1945	116
Chestnut-winged cinclodes	Cinclodes albidiventris Sclater, PL, 1860	117
Cream-winged cinclodes	Cinclodes albiventris (Philippi & Landbeck, 1861)	118
Olrog's cinclodes	Cinclodes olrogi Nores & Yzurieta, 1979	119
Grey-flanked cinclodes	Cinclodes oustaleti Scott, WED, 1900	120
Stout-billed cinclodes	Cinclodes excelsior Sclater, PL, 1860	121
Royal cinclodes	Cinclodes aricomae (Carriker, 1932)	122
White-bellied cinclodes	Cinclodes palliatus (Tschudi, 1844)	123
White-winged cinclodes	Cinclodes atacamensis (Philippi, 1857)	124
Dark-bellied cinclodes	Cinclodes patagonicus (Gmelin, JF, 1789)	125
Peruvian seaside cinclodes	Cinclodes taczanowskii Berlepsch & Stolzmann, 1892	126
Chilean seaside cinclodes	Cinclodes nigrofumosus (d'Orbigny & Lafresnaye, 1838)	127
Bamboo foliage-gleaner	Anabazenops dorsalis (Sclater, PL & Salvin, 1880)	128
White-collared foliage-gleaner	Anabazenops fuscus (Vieillot, 1816)	129
Great xenops	Megaxenops parnaguae Reiser, 1905	130
Pale-browed treehunter	Cichlocolaptes leucophrus (Jardine & Selby, 1830)	131
Cryptic treehunter	Cichlocolaptes mazarbarnetti Buzzetti, 2014	132
Sharp-billed treehunter	Heliobletus contaminatus Berlepsch, 1885	133
Slaty-winged foliage-gleaner	Neophilydor fuscipenne Salvin, 1866	134
Rufous-rumped foliage-gleaner	Neophilydor erythrocercum (Pelzeln, 1859)	135
Alagoas foliage-gleaner	Philydor novaesi Teixeira & Gonzaga, 1983	136
Black-capped foliage-gleaner	Philydor atricapillus (Wied-Neuwied, M, 1821)	137
Cinnamon-rumped foliage-gleaner	Philydor pyrrhodes (Cabanis, 1849)	138
Montane foliage-gleaner	Anabacerthia striaticollis Lafresnaye, 1841	139
Scaly-throated foliage-gleaner	Anabacerthia variegaticeps (Sclater, PL, 1857)	140
Rufous-tailed foliage-gleaner	Anabacerthia ruficaudata (d'Orbigny & Lafresnaye, 1838)	141
White-browed foliage-gleaner	Anabacerthia amaurotis (Temminck, 1823)	142
Ochre-breasted foliage-gleaner	Anabacerthia lichtensteini (Cabanis & Heine, 1860)	143
Buff-browed foliage-gleaner	Syndactyla rufosuperciliata (Lafresnaye, 1832)	144
Planalto foliage-gleaner	Syndactyla dimidiata (Pelzeln, 1859)	145
Tepui foliage-gleaner	Syndactyla roraimae (Hellmayr, 1917)	146
Lineated foliage-gleaner	Syndactyla subalaris (Sclater, PL, 1859)	147
Rufous-necked foliage-gleaner	Syndactyla ruficollis (Taczanowski, 1884)	148
Guttulate foliage-gleaner	Syndactyla guttulata (Sclater, PL, 1858)	149
Peruvian recurvebill	Syndactyla ucayalae (Chapman, 1928)	150
Bolivian recurvebill	Syndactyla striata (Carriker, 1935)	151
Chestnut-winged hookbill	Ancistrops strigilatus (Spix, 1825)	152
Buff-fronted foliage-gleaner	Dendroma rufa (Vieillot, 1818)	153
Chestnut-winged foliage-gleaner	Dendroma erythroptera (Sclater, PL, 1856)	154
Canebrake groundcreeper	Clibanornis dendrocolaptoides (Pelzeln, 1859)	155
Henna-capped foliage-gleaner	Clibanornis rectirostris (Wied-Neuwied, M, 1831)	156
Henna-hooded foliage-gleaner	Clibanornis erythrocephalus (Chapman, 1919)	157
Ruddy foliage-gleaner	Clibanornis rubiginosus (Sclater, PL, 1857)	158
Santa Marta foliage-gleaner	Clibanornis rufipectus (Bangs, 1898)	159
Uniform treehunter	Thripadectes ignobilis (Sclater, PL & Salvin, 1879)	160
Flammulated treehunter	Thripadectes flammulatus (Eyton, 1849)	161
Peruvian treehunter	Thripadectes scrutator Taczanowski, 1874	162
Streak-breasted treehunter	Thripadectes rufobrunneus (Lawrence, 1865)	163
Black-billed treehunter	Thripadectes melanorhynchus (Tschudi, 1844)	164
Striped treehunter	Thripadectes holostictus (Sclater, PL & Salvin, 1876)	165
Streak-capped treehunter	Thripadectes virgaticeps Lawrence, 1874	166
Chestnut-crowned foliage-gleaner	Automolus rufipileatus (Pelzeln, 1859)	167
Brown-rumped foliage-gleaner	Automolus melanopezus (Sclater, PL, 1858)	168
Fawn-throated foliage-gleaner	Automolus cervinigularis (Sclater, PL, 1857)	169
Ochre-throated foliage-gleaner	Automolus ochrolaemus (Tschudi, 1844)	170
Chiriqui foliage-gleaner	Automolus exsertus Bangs, 1901	171
Eastern woodhaunter	Automolus subulatus (Spix, 1824)	172
Western woodhaunter	Automolus virgatus (Lawrence, 1867)	173
Olive-backed foliage-gleaner	Automolus infuscatus (Sclater, PL, 1856)	143
Para foliage-gleaner	Automolus paraensis Hartert, EJO, 1902	175
Pernambuco foliage-gleaner	Automolus lammi Zimmer, JT, 1947	176
White-eyed foliage-gleaner	Automolus leucophthalmus (Wied-Neuwied, M, 1821)	177
Spotted barbtail	Premnoplex brunnescens (Sclater, PL, 1856)	178
White-throated barbtail	Premnoplex tatei Chapman, 1925	179
Beautiful treerunner	Margarornis bellulus Nelson, 1912	180
Ruddy treerunner	Margarornis rubiginosus Lawrence, 1865	181
Star-chested treerunner	Margarornis stellatus Sclater, PL & Salvin, 1873	182
Pearled treerunner	Margarornis squamiger (d'Orbigny & Lafresnaye, 1838)	183
Thorn-tailed rayadito	Aphrastura spinicauda (Gmelin, JF, 1789)	184
Masafuera rayadito	Aphrastura masafuerae (Philippi & Landbeck, 1866)	185
Des Murs's wiretail	Sylviorthorhynchus desmurii Gay, 1845	186
Tawny tit-spinetail	Sylviorthorhynchus yanacensis (Carriker, 1933)	187
Brown-capped tit-spinetail	Leptasthenura fuliginiceps (d'Orbigny & Lafresnaye, 1837)	188
Tufted tit-spinetail	Leptasthenura platensis Reichenbach, 1853	189
Plain-mantled tit-spinetail	Leptasthenura aegithaloides (Kittlitz, 1830)	190
Striolated tit-spinetail	Leptasthenura striolata (Pelzeln, 1856)	191
Rusty-crowned tit-spinetail	Leptasthenura pileata Sclater, PL, 1881	192
White-browed tit-spinetail	Leptasthenura xenothorax Chapman, 1921	193
Streak-backed tit-spinetail	Leptasthenura striata (Philippi & Landbeck, 1863)	194
Andean tit-spinetail	Leptasthenura andicola Sclater, PL, 1870	195
Araucaria tit-spinetail	Leptasthenura setaria (Temminck, 1824)	196
Rufous-fronted thornbird	Phacellodomus rufifrons (Wied-Neuwied, M, 1821)	197
Plain thornbird	Phacellodomus inornatus Ridgway, 1887	198
Streak-fronted thornbird	Phacellodomus striaticeps (d'Orbigny & Lafresnaye, 1838)	199
Little thornbird	Phacellodomus sibilatrix Sclater, PL, 1879	200
Chestnut-backed thornbird	Phacellodomus dorsalis Salvin, 1895	201
Spot-breasted thornbird	Phacellodomus maculipectus Cabanis, 1883	202
Freckle-breasted thornbird	Phacellodomus striaticollis (d'Orbigny & Lafresnaye, 1838)	203
Greater thornbird	Phacellodomus ruber (Vieillot, 1817)	204
Orange-eyed thornbird	Phacellodomus erythrophthalmus (Wied-Neuwied, M, 1821)	205
Orange-breasted thornbird	Phacellodomus ferrugineigula (Pelzeln, 1858)	206
White-browed spinetail	Hellmayrea gularis (Lafresnaye, 1843)	207
Firewood-gatherer	Anumbius annumbi (Vieillot, 1817)	208
Lark-like brushrunner	Coryphistera alaudina Burmeister, 1860	209
Rusty-vented canastero	Asthenes dorbignyi (Reichenbach, 1853)	210
Dark-winged canastero	Asthenes arequipae (Sclater, PL & Salvin, 1869)	211
Pale-tailed canastero	Asthenes huancavelicae Morrison, 1938	212
Berlepsch's canastero	Asthenes berlepschi (Hellmayr, 1917)	213
Short-billed canastero	Asthenes baeri (Berlepsch, 1906)	214
Cipo canastero	Asthenes luizae Vielliard, 1990	215
Hudson's canastero	Asthenes hudsoni (Sclater, PL, 1874)	216
Austral canastero	Asthenes anthoides (King, PP, 1831)	217
Line-fronted canastero	Asthenes urubambensis (Chapman, 1919)	218
Many-striped canastero	Asthenes flammulata (Jardine, 1850)	219
Junin canastero	Asthenes virgata (Sclater, PL, 1874)	220
Scribble-tailed canastero	Asthenes maculicauda (Berlepsch, 1901)	221
Streak-backed canastero	Asthenes wyatti (Sclater, PL & Salvin, 1871)	222
Streak-throated canastero	Asthenes humilis (Cabanis, 1873)	223
Cordilleran canastero	Asthenes modesta (Eyton, 1852)	224
Itatiaia spinetail	Asthenes moreirae (Miranda-Ribeiro, 1905)	225
Sharp-billed canastero	Asthenes pyrrholeuca (Vieillot, 1817)	226
Black-throated thistletail	Asthenes harterti (Berlepsch, 1901)	227
Puna thistletail	Asthenes helleri (Chapman, 1923)	228
Vilcabamba thistletail	Asthenes vilcabambae (Vaurie, Weske & Terborgh, 1972)	229
Ayacucho thistletail	Asthenes ayacuchensis (Vaurie, Weske & Terborgh, 1972)	230
Canyon canastero	Asthenes pudibunda (Sclater, PL, 1874)	231
Rusty-fronted canastero	Asthenes ottonis (Berlepsch, 1901)	232
Maquis canastero	Asthenes heterura (Berlepsch, 1901)	233
Eye-ringed thistletail	Asthenes palpebralis (Cabanis, 1873)	234
Ochre-browed thistletail	Asthenes coryi (Berlepsch, 1888)	235
Perija thistletail	Asthenes perijana (Phelps, WH Jr, 1977)	236
White-chinned thistletail	Asthenes fuliginosa (Lafresnaye, 1843)	237
Mouse-colored thistletail	Asthenes griseomurina (Sclater, PL, 1882)	238
Pink-legged graveteiro	Acrobatornis fonsecai Pacheco, Whitney & Gonzaga, 1996	239
Orange-fronted plushcrown	Metopothrix aurantiaca Sclater, PL & Salvin, 1866	240
Double-banded greytail	Xenerpestes minlosi Berlepsch, 1886	241
Equatorial greytail	Xenerpestes singularis (Taczanowski & Berlepsch, 1885)	242
Spectacled prickletail	Siptornis striaticollis (Lafresnaye, 1843)	243
Roraiman barbtail	Roraimia adusta (Salvin & Godman, 1884)	244
Speckled spinetail	Thripophaga gutturata (d'Orbigny & Lafresnaye, 1838)	245
Striated softtail	Thripophaga macroura (Wied-Neuwied, M, 1821)	246
Orinoco softtail	Thripophaga cherriei Berlepsch & Hartert, EJO, 1902	247
Delta Amacuro softtail	Thripophaga amacurensis Hilty, Ascanio & Whittaker, 2013	248
Plain softtail	Thripophaga fusciceps Sclater, PL, 1889	249
Straight-billed reedhaunter	Limnoctites rectirostris (Gould, 1839)	250
Sulphur-bearded reedhaunter	Limnoctites sulphuriferus (Burmeister, 1869)	251
Russet-mantled softtail	Cranioleuca berlepschi (Hellmayr, 1905)	252
Vilcabamba spinetail	Cranioleuca weskei Remsen, 1984	253
Marcapata spinetail	Cranioleuca marcapatae Zimmer, JT, 1935	254
Light-crowned spinetail	Cranioleuca albiceps (d'Orbigny & Lafresnaye, 1837)	255
Rusty-backed spinetail	Cranioleuca vulpina (Pelzeln, 1856)	256
Coiba spinetail	Cranioleuca dissita Wetmore, 1957	257
Parker's spinetail	Cranioleuca vulpecula (Sclater, PL & Salvin, 1866)	258
Crested spinetail	Cranioleuca subcristata (Sclater, PL, 1874)	259
Stripe-crowned spinetail	Cranioleuca pyrrhophia (Vieillot, 1818)	260
Bolivian spinetail	Cranioleuca henricae Maijer & Fjeldså, 1997	261
Olive spinetail	Cranioleuca obsoleta (Reichenbach, 1853)	262
Pallid spinetail	Cranioleuca pallida (Wied-Neuwied, M, 1831)	263
Grey-headed spinetail	Cranioleuca semicinerea (Reichenbach, 1853)	264
Creamy-crested spinetail	Cranioleuca albicapilla (Cabanis, 1873)	265
Red-faced spinetail	Cranioleuca erythrops (Sclater, PL, 1860)	266
Tepui spinetail	Cranioleuca demissa (Salvin & Godman, 1884)	267
Streak-capped spinetail	Cranioleuca hellmayri (Bangs, 1907)	268
Ash-browed spinetail	Cranioleuca curtata (Sclater, PL, 1870)	269
Line-cheeked spinetail	Cranioleuca antisiensis (Sclater, PL, 1859)	270
Scaled spinetail	Cranioleuca muelleri (Hellmayr, 1911)	271
Dusky-tailed canastero	Pseudasthenes humicola (Kittlitz, 1830)	272
Patagonian canastero	Pseudasthenes patagonica (d'Orbigny, 1839)	273
Steinbach's canastero	Pseudasthenes steinbachi (Hartert, EJO, 1909)	274
Cactus canastero	Pseudasthenes cactorum (Koepcke, 1959)	275
Bay-capped wren-spinetail	Spartonoica maluroides (d'Orbigny & Lafresnaye, 1837)	276
Caatinga cacholote	Pseudoseisura cristata (Spix, 1824)	277
Grey-crested cacholote	Pseudoseisura unirufa (d'Orbigny & Lafresnaye, 1838)	278
Brown cacholote	Pseudoseisura lophotes (Reichenbach, 1853)	279
White-throated cacholote	Pseudoseisura gutturalis (d'Orbigny & Lafresnaye, 1838)	280
Yellow-chinned spinetail	Certhiaxis cinnamomeus (Gmelin, JF, 1788)	281
Red-and-white spinetail	Certhiaxis mustelinus (Sclater, PL, 1874)	282
White-bellied spinetail	Mazaria propinqua (Pelzeln, 1859)	283
Chotoy spinetail	Schoeniophylax phryganophilus (Vieillot, 1817)	284
Ochre-cheeked spinetail	Synallaxis scutata Sclater, PL, 1859	285
Grey-bellied spinetail	Synallaxis cinerascens Temminck, 1823	286
Plain-crowned spinetail	Synallaxis gujanensis (Gmelin, JF, 1789)	287
Araguaia spinetail	Synallaxis simoni Hellmayr, 1907	288
White-lored spinetail	Synallaxis albilora Pelzeln, 1856	289
Maranon spinetail	Synallaxis maranonica Taczanowski, 1879	290
Great spinetail	Synallaxis hypochondriaca (Salvin, 1895)	291
Chinchipe spinetail	Synallaxis chinchipensis Chapman, 1925	292
Necklaced spinetail	Synallaxis stictothorax Sclater, PL, 1859	293
Russet-bellied spinetail	Synallaxis zimmeri Koepcke, 1957	294
Slaty spinetail	Synallaxis brachyura Lafresnaye, 1843	295
Silvery-throated spinetail	Synallaxis subpudica Sclater, PL, 1874	296
Red-shouldered spinetail	Synallaxis hellmayri Reiser, 1905	297
Rufous-capped spinetail	Synallaxis ruficapilla Vieillot, 1819	298
Bahia spinetail	Synallaxis cinerea Wied-Neuwied, M, 1831	299
Pinto's spinetail	Synallaxis infuscata Pinto, 1950	300
Dusky spinetail	Synallaxis moesta Sclater, PL, 1856	301
McConnell's spinetail	Synallaxis macconnelli Chubb, C, 1919	302
Cabanis's spinetail	Synallaxis cabanisi Berlepsch & Leverkühn, 1890	303
Cinereous-breasted spinetail	Synallaxis hypospodia Sclater, PL, 1874	304
Spix's spinetail	Synallaxis spixi Sclater, PL, 1856	305
Dark-breasted spinetail	Synallaxis albigularis Sclater, PL, 1858	306
Rio Orinoco spinetail	Synallaxis beverlyae Hilty & Ascanio, 2009	307
Pale-breasted spinetail	Synallaxis albescens Temminck, 1823	308
Sooty-fronted spinetail	Synallaxis frontalis Pelzeln, 1859	309
Azara's spinetail	Synallaxis azarae d'Orbigny, 1835	310
Apurimac spinetail	Synallaxis courseni Blake, 1971	311
White-whiskered spinetail	Synallaxis candei d'Orbigny & Lafresnaye, 1838	312
Rufous-breasted spinetail	Synallaxis erythrothorax Sclater, PL, 1855	313
Hoary-throated spinetail	Synallaxis kollari Pelzeln, 1856	314
Blackish-headed spinetail	Synallaxis tithys Taczanowski, 1877	315
Rusty-headed spinetail	Synallaxis fuscorufa Sclater, PL, 1882	316
Rufous spinetail	Synallaxis unirufa Lafresnaye, 1843	317
Black-throated spinetail	Synallaxis castanea Sclater, PL, 1856	318
Stripe-breasted spinetail	Synallaxis cinnamomea Lafresnaye, 1843	319
Ruddy spinetail	Synallaxis rutilans Temminck, 1823	320
Chestnut-throated spinetail	Synallaxis cherriei Gyldenstolpe, 1930	321
