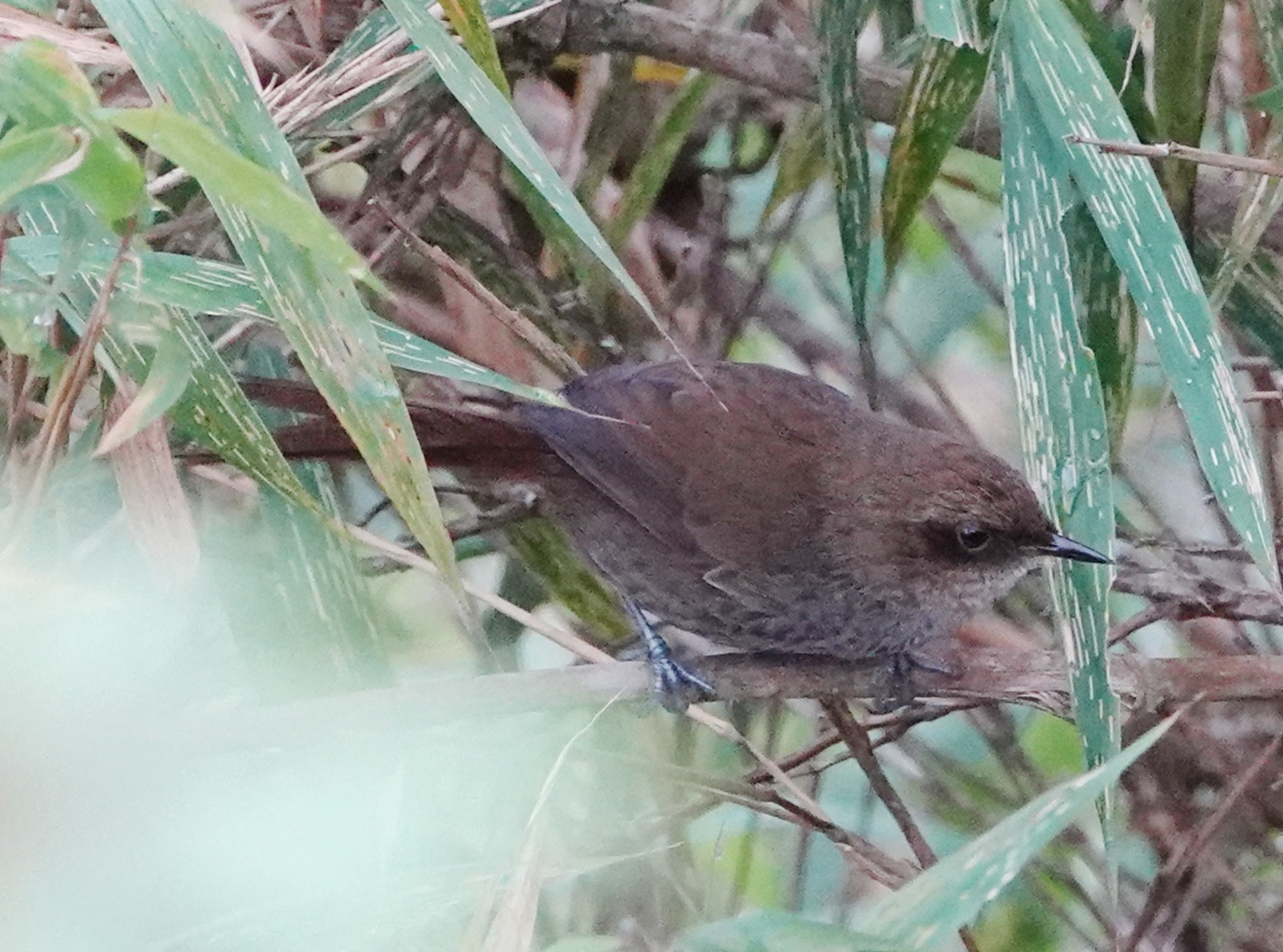

Conservation status
- Least Concern (IUCN 3.1)

Scientific classification
- Kingdom: Animalia
- Phylum: Chordata
- Class: Aves
- Order: Passeriformes
- Family: Furnariidae
- Genus: Asthenes
- Species: A. vilcabambae

Binomial name
- Asthenes vilcabambae (Vaurie, Weske & Terborgh, 1972)

Synonyms
- Schizoeaca vilcabambae

= Vilcabamba thistletail =

Species of bird

The Vilcabamba thistletail (Asthenes vilcabambae) is a species of bird in the Furnariinae subfamily of the ovenbird family Furnariidae. It is endemic to the Vilcabamba Mountains of Peru.

== Taxonomy and systematics ==
The Vilcabamba thistletail was originally described as a subspecies of the white-chinned thistletail (then Schizoeaca fuliginosa, now Asthenes fuliginosa). It was later separated as a species, and later still was treated as conspecific with what is now the Ayacucho thistletail (Asthenes ayacuchensis). These species and several others were long assigned to genus Schizoeaca but genetic data showed that the genus is embedded within Asthenes. A phylogenetic study published in 2015 that examined both DNA sequence data and vocalization recordings of members of the genus Asthenes found that the Ayacucho thistletail was more similar to the eye-ringed thistletail than it was to the Vilcabamba thistletail. Based on this evidence the Vilcabamba and Ayacucho thistletails were separated as species.

The Vilcabamba thistletail is monotypic.

== Description ==
The Vilcabamba thistletail is 18 to 20 cm (7.1 to 7.9 in) long and weighs 18.5 to 22 g (0.65 to 0.78 oz). The sexes have the same plumage. Adults have a brownish face with a paler brown forehead and wide supercilium. Their crown is brownish faintly spotted with black. Their back and rump are brownish and their wings dark brown with rufous edges to the feathers. Their tail is a paler but more rufescent brown than the back; it is long and deeply forked with few barbs at the feather ends that give a ragged appearance. Their chin is light ochraceous to tawny, their throat pale grayish brown, and their underparts a darker grayish with a faint scaled appearance and brownish flanks. Their iris is dark brown, their bill blackish to dark gray with sometimes a pale base to the mandible, and their legs and feet dark bluish gray.

== Distribution and habitat ==
The Vilcabamba thistletail is found only in the northern and central Cordillera Vilcabamba of Peru. There it occurs east of the Apurímac River in the departments of Junín and Cuzco. It primarily inhabits elfin forest and Polylepis woodlands in the tree line ecotone. It is found in lesser numbers in the higher páramo grassland and lower cloudforest. It favors areas with dense stands of Chusquea bamboo. In elevation it ranges mostly between 2,800 and 3,600 m (9,200 and 11,800 ft) and is rarely found as low as 2,500 m (8,200 ft).

== Behavior ==
=== Movement ===
The Vilcabamba thistletail is believed to be a year-round resident throughout its range.

=== Feeding ===
The Vilcabamba thistletail's diet and foraging behavior are essentially unknown. It is usually seen singly or in pairs. It is assumed to feed mostly on arthropods that it gleans from foliage.

=== Breeding ===
Nothing is known about the Vicabamba thistletail's breeding biology.

=== Vocalization ===
The Volcabamba thistletail's main song is "several clear, slightly rising notes that progressively increase in speed...into a fast trill...and then ends on a single slightly lower-pitched note." Another song is "short, fast bursts of 3-4 strongly overslurred notes". Its main call is a short "pyeek".

== Status ==
The IUCN has assessed the Vilcabamba thistletail as being of Least Concern. It has a very restricted range and an unknown population size, though the latter is believed to be stable. No immediate threats have been identified. It is apparently "quite common in appropriate habitat" and "[l]arge portions of [its] range are in areas currently inaccessible to human disturbance." Much of the range is within Otishi National Park.
