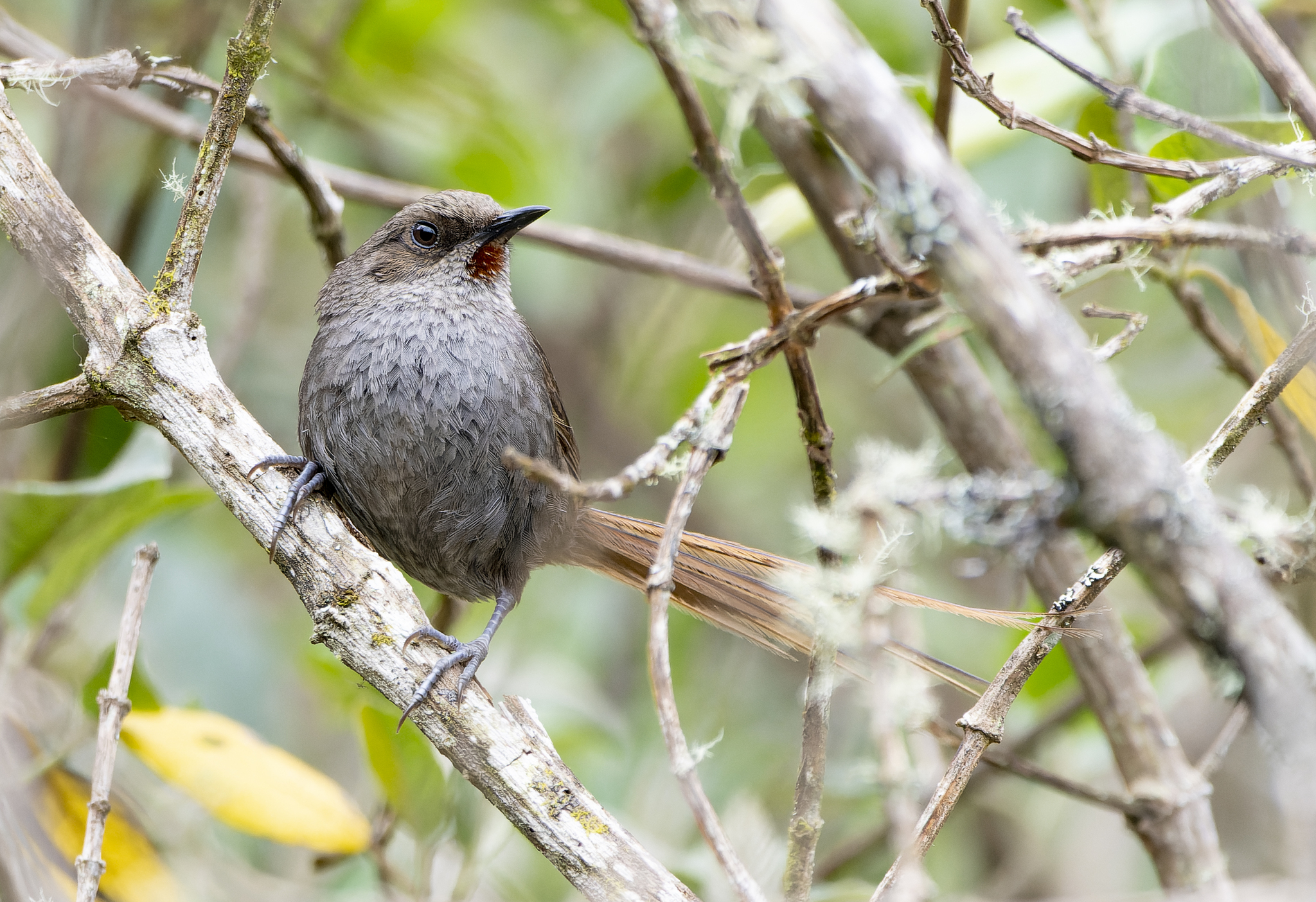

Conservation status
- Least Concern (IUCN 3.1)

Scientific classification
- Kingdom: Animalia
- Phylum: Chordata
- Class: Aves
- Order: Passeriformes
- Family: Furnariidae
- Genus: Asthenes
- Species: A. ayacuchensis

Binomial name
- Asthenes ayacuchensis (Vaurie, Weske & Terborgh, 1972)

= Ayacucho thistletail =

Species of bird

The Ayacucho thistletail (Asthenes ayacuchensis) is a species of bird in the Furnariinae subfamily of the ovenbird family Furnariidae. It is endemic to the Department of Ayacucho, Peru.

== Taxonomy and systematics ==
The Ayacucho thistletail was originally described as a subspecies of the white-chinned thistletail (then Schizoeaca fuliginosa, now Asthenes fuliginosa). It was later treated as conspecific with what is now the Vilcabamba thistletail (Asthenes vilcabambae). These species and several others were long assigned to genus Schizoeaca but genetic data showed that the genus is embedded within Asthenes. A phylogenetic study published in 2015 that examined both DNA sequence data and vocalizations of members of the genus Asthenes found that the Ayacucho thistletail was more similar to the eye-ringed thistletail than it was to the Vilcabamba thistletail. Based on this evidence it was elevated to species rank.

The Ayacucho thistletail is monotypic.

== Description ==
The Ayacucho thistletail is 18 to 20 cm (7.1 to 7.9 in) long. The sexes have the same plumage. Adults have a brownish face with a paler brown supercilium. Their crown is brownish faintly spotted with black. Their back and rump are brownish and their wings dark brown with rufous edges to the feathers. Their tail is a paler but more rufescent brown than the back; it is long and deeply forked with few barbs at the feather ends that give a ragged appearance. Their chin is grayish with a bright reddish chestnut center and the rest of their underparts are a plain darker grayish. Their iris is dark brown, their bill blackish to dark gray with sometimes a pale base to the mandible, and their legs and feet dark bluish gray.

== Distribution and habitat ==
The Ayacucho thistletail is found in the northern part of Peru's Department of Ayacucho west of the Apurímac River. It primarily inhabits elfin forest and Polylepis woodlands in the tree line ecotone. It favors areas with dense stands of Chusquea bamboo. In elevation it ranges mostly between 3,300 and 3,700 m (10,800 and 12,100 ft).

== Behavior ==
=== Movement ===
The Ayacucho thistletail is believed to be a year-round resident throughout its range.

=== Feeding ===
The Ayacucho thistletail's diet and foraging behavior are essentially unknown. It is usually seen singly or in pairs. It is assumed to feed mostly on arthropods that it gleans from foliage.

=== Breeding ===
Nothing is known about the Ayacucho thistletail's breeding biology.

=== Vocalization ===
The Ayacucho thistletail's primary song is "a rapid, high-pitched, even trill lasting two seconds in duration, delivered at a steady frequency". Its main call is a high-pitched "pyeek".

== Status ==
The IUCN has assessed the Ayacucho thistletail as being of Least Concern. It has a very restricted range and an unknown population size, though the latter is believed to be stable. No immediate threats have been identified. Its total range is "perhaps just 500 km^{2} [190 mi^{2}], within which elfin forest habitats are fragmented and degraded by anthropogenic disturbance."
