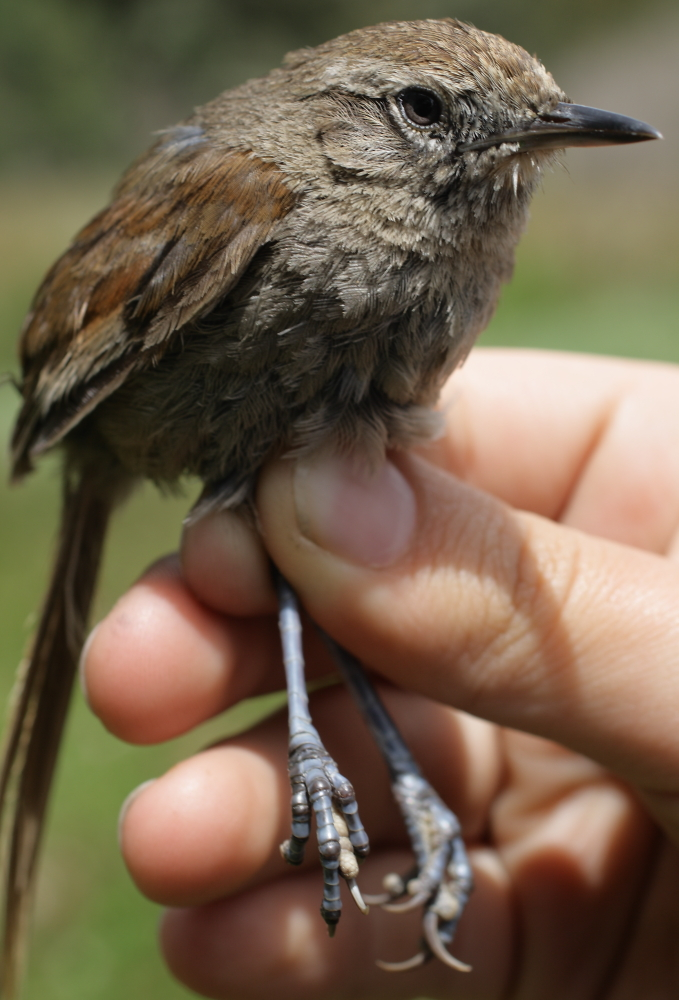

Conservation status
- Endangered (IUCN 3.1)

Scientific classification
- Kingdom: Animalia
- Phylum: Chordata
- Class: Aves
- Order: Passeriformes
- Family: Furnariidae
- Genus: Asthenes
- Species: A. perijana

Binomial name
- Asthenes perijana (Phelps, 1977)

Synonyms
- Schizoeaca perijana

= Perijá thistletail =

Species of bird

The Perija thistletail (Asthenes perijana) is an Endangered species of bird in the Furnariinae subfamily of the ovenbird family Furnariidae. It is endemic to the Perijá Mountains in Colombia and Venezuela.

== Taxonomy and systematics ==
The Perija thistletail was long treated as a subspecies of the white-chinned thistletail (then Schizoeaca fuliginosa, now Asthenes fuliginosa) but was eventually separated as a species. They and several other species were in genus Schizoeaca but genetic data showed that the genus is embedded within Asthenes. The Perija thistletail is monotypic.

== Description ==
The Perija thistletail is 19 to 22 cm (7.5 to 8.7 in) long and weighs 16 to 21 g (0.56 to 0.74 oz). The sexes have the same plumage. Adults have a faint grayish supercilium. Their crown, back, rump, and tail are grayish olive-brown. Their wings are grayish olive-brown with chestnut on the coverts and the base of the flight feathers. Their tail is long and deeply forked with few barbs at the feather ends that give a ragged appearance. Their chin has a cinnamon-buff patch. Their throat and the rest of their underparts are brownish gray. Their iris is reddish brown, their maxilla black, their mandible grayish with a black tip, and their legs and feet gray.

== Distribution and habitat ==
The Perija thistletail is found only in the Serranía del Perijá, a mountain range that straddles the border between northeastern Colombia and northwestern Venezuela. It primarily inhabits páramo grasslands, the upper edge of cloudforest, and dense undergrowth at tree line. In elevation it ranges between 2,950 and 3,400 m (9,700 and 11,200 ft).

== Behavior ==
=== Movement ===
The Perija thistletail is believed to be a year-round resident throughout its range.

=== Feeding ===
The Perija thistletail feeds mostly on arthropods and occasionally adds berries to its diet. It forages in the undergrowth, usually singly or in pairs. It is believed to forage by gleaning prey from foliage and branches.

=== Breeding ===
The Perija thistletail's breeding season has not been defined but includes July. Nothing else is known about the species' breeding biology.

=== Vocalization ===
The Perija thistletail's song is "some 3-5 drawn out high-pitched 'pee' notes followed by a short descending dry trill".

== Status ==
The IUCN originally assessed the Perija thistletail as Vulnerable but since 2004 as Endangered. It has a very small range and its estimated population of between 150 and 700 mature individuals is believed to be decreasing. "Habitat below 2,000 m in the Sierra de Perijá is threatened by narcotics cultivation, uncontrolled colonisation, cattle-ranching and mineral exploitation". " Only patches of montane forest remain on the steepest slopes of the Cerro Pintado." Its area of occupancy is estimated at 110 km^{2} (42 sq mi). One preserve in Colombia offers some protection, but protection in Venezueala's Sierra de Perijá National Park is only nominal. "At the national level, regarded as Endangered in Colombia and Vulnerable in Venezuela."
