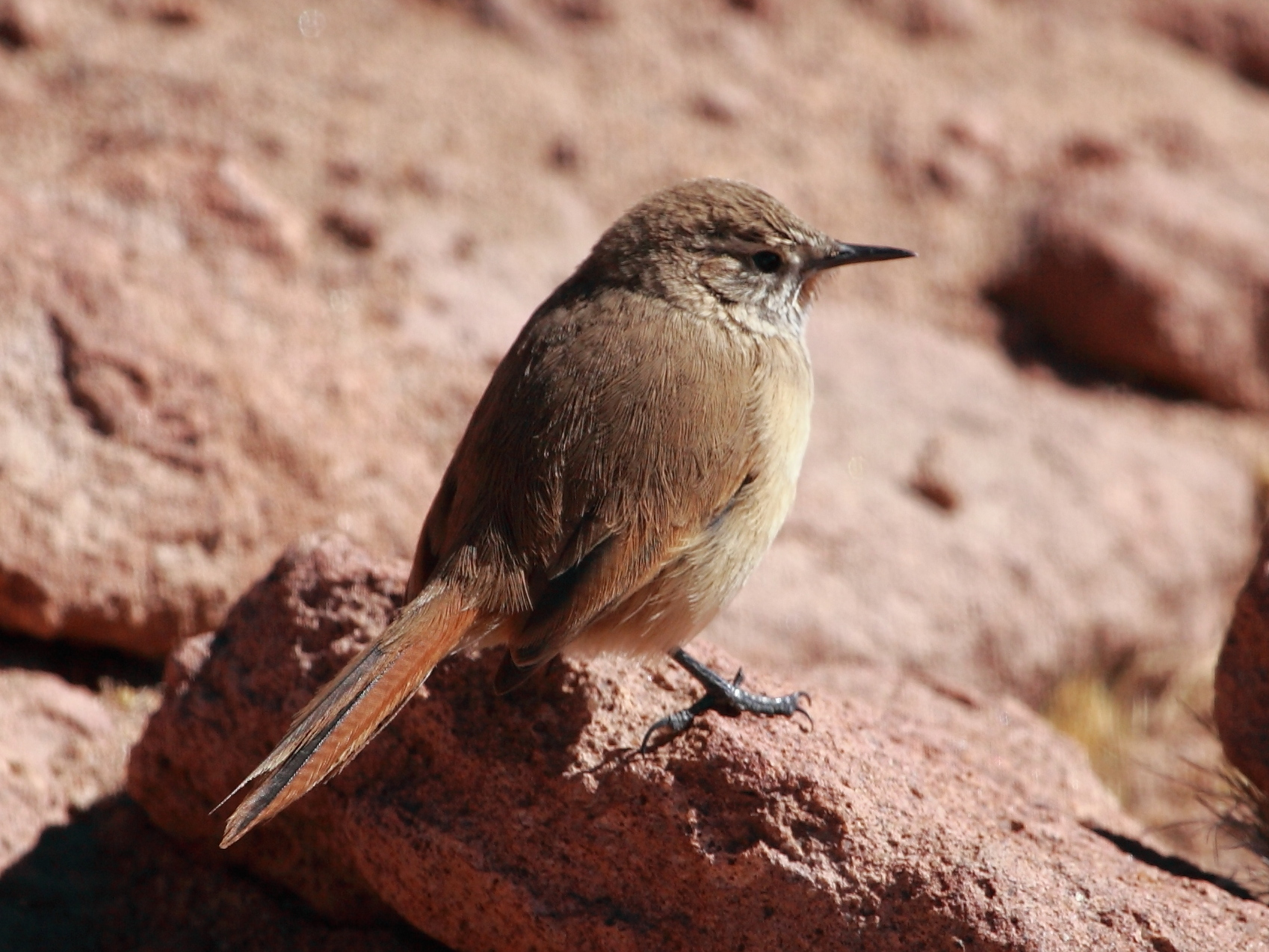
- Cordilleran canastero (Asthenes modesta)

Scientific classification
- Kingdom: Animalia
- Phylum: Chordata
- Class: Aves
- Order: Passeriformes
- Family: Furnariidae
- Genus: Asthenes; Reichenbach, 1853

Type species
- Synallaxis sordida Sharp-billed canastero Lesson, 1839

Species
- see text

Synonyms
- Schizoeaca Cabanis, 1853; Astheres Bonaparte, 1854; Oreophylax Hellmayr, 1925

= Canastero =

Canasteros

Genus of birds

Canasteros and thistletails are the small passerine birds of South America belonging to the genus Asthenes. Canastero is Spanish for 'basket-maker', referring to the large, domed nests these species make of sticks or grass. They inhabit shrublands and grasslands in temperate climates from the lowlands to the highlands. They feed on insects and other invertebrates gleaned from the ground or the low vegetation.

== Taxonomy ==
The genus Asthenes was introduced in 1853 by the German naturalist Ludwig Reichenbach. The name is from Ancient Greek: asthenēs 'insignificant'. The type species was designated by George Robert Gray in 1855 as Synallaxis sordida Lesson. This taxon is now considered to be a subspecies of the sharp-billed canastero (Asthenes pyrrholeuca sordida).

In 2010, it was discovered that the thistletails and the Itatiaia spinetail, formerly placed in their own genera (Schizoeaca and Oreophylax, respectively), are actually part of a rapid radiation of long-tailed Asthenes. At the same time, four species, the cactus, dusky-tailed, Steinbach's and Patagonian canasteros, were split off into the new genus Pseudasthenes.

=== Species ===
The genus contains 29 species:

Image	Scientific name	Common name	Distribution
	Pale-tailed canastero	Asthenes huancavelicae	Peru
	Dark-winged canastero	Asthenes arequipae	Puna grassland
	Rusty-vented canastero	Asthenes dorbignyi	southern Peru
	Berlepsch's canastero	Asthenes berlepschi	western Bolivia
	Short-billed canastero	Asthenes baeri	Argentina, western Paraguay and Uruguay
	Cipo canastero	Asthenes luizae	Serra do Cipó
	Hudson's canastero	Asthenes hudsoni	Argentina and Uruguay
	Austral canastero	Asthenes anthoides	western Patagonia and Los Lagos Region
	Line-fronted canastero	Asthenes urubambensis	Peru and Bolivia
	Many-striped canastero	Asthenes flammulata	northern Andes
	Junin canastero	Asthenes virgata	central Peru
	Scribble-tailed canastero	Asthenes maculicauda	central Andes
	Streak-backed canastero	Asthenes wyatti	Ecuador, Puna grassland and Sierras de Córdoba
	Streak-throated canastero	Asthenes humilis	Puna grassland
	Cordilleran canastero	Asthenes modesta	Puna grassland, Patagonia and Sierras de Córdoba
	Itatiaia spinetail	Asthenes moreirae	Itatiaia National Park and nearby massifs
	Sharp-billed canastero	Asthenes pyrrholeuca	southern Cone
	Black-throated thistletail	Asthenes harterti	Bolivian Andes
	Puna thistletail	Asthenes helleri	southeastern Peru
-	Vilcabamba thistletail	Asthenes vilcabambae	central Peru
	Ayacucho thistletail	Asthenes ayacuchensis	central Peru
	Canyon canastero	Asthenes pudibunda	Peru
	Rusty-fronted canastero	Asthenes ottonis	Bolivia and northern Argentina
	Maquis canastero	Asthenes heterura	Puna grassland
	Eye-ringed thistletail	Asthenes palpebralis	central Peru
-	Ochre-browed thistletail	Asthenes coryi	Cordillera de Merida
	Perija thistletail	Asthenes perijana	Serranía del Perijá
	White-chinned thistletail	Asthenes fuliginosa	northern Andes
	Mouse-colored thistletail	Asthenes griseomurina	southern Ecuador and northern Peru

== Description ==
They are typically 15–18 centimetres (5.9–7.1 in) long and slim with long tails and thin, pointed bills. They are mostly dull and brown in colour but vary in tail pattern and presence of streaking. They have trilling songs.

== Distribution and habitat ==
Most species occur in open country, including mesic to arid scrublands and grasslands. Some species inhabit dry forests. Only three species are migratory.
