= Ochre-browed thistletail =

Conservation status
- Least Concern (IUCN 3.1)

Scientific classification
- Kingdom: Animalia
- Phylum: Chordata
- Class: Aves
- Order: Passeriformes
- Family: Furnariidae
- Genus: Asthenes
- Species: A. coryi

Binomial name
- Asthenes coryi (Berlepsch, 1888)

Synonyms
- Schizoeaca coryi

Species of bird

The ochre-browed thistletail (Asthenes coryi) is a species of bird in the Furnariinae subfamily of the ovenbird family Furnariidae. It is endemic to western Venezuela.

== Taxonomy and systematics ==
The ochre-browed thistletail was long treated as a subspecies of the white-chinned thistletail (then Schizoeaca fuliginosa, now Asthenes fuliginosa) but was eventually separated as a species. They and several other species were in genus Schizoeaca but genetic data showed that the genus is embedded within Asthenes. The ochre-browed thistletail is monotypic.

== Description ==
The ochre-browed thistletail is 16 to 18 cm (6.3 to 7.1 in) long and weighs 15 to 18 g (0.53 to 0.63 oz). The sexes have the same plumage. Adults have an ochraceous supercilium on an otherwise darker face. Their forehead is dull ochraceous rufous, and their crown, back, rump, and tail are olive-brown. Their wings are a dull reddish brown. Their tail is long and deeply forked with few barbs at the feather ends that give a ragged appearance. Their chin has a tawny-rufous patch. Their throat and the rest of their underparts are pale gray-brown with a whitish center to the belly. Their iris is dark brown to gray-brown, their bill dark grayish brown with a pinkish base to the mandible, and their legs and feet bluish gray.

== Distribution and habitat ==
The ochre-browed thistletail is found in the Andes of western Venezuela between the states of Trujillo and Táchira. It primarily inhabits páramo grasslands, taller páramo vegetation, the upper edge of cloudforest, and dense undergrowth at tree line. In elevation it mostly ranges between 3,500 and 4,100 m (11,500 and 13,500 ft) though it occurs in openings in cloudforest as low as 2,800 m (9,200 ft).

== Behavior ==
=== Movement ===
The ochre-browed thistletail is a year-round resident throughout its range.

=== Feeding ===
The ochre-browed thistletail feeds mostly on arthropods but also includes small amounts of seeds in its diet. It usually forages singly or in pairs and will occasionally join mixed-species feeding flocks. It gleans its prey mostly from foliage and small branches in the understory but occasionally will feed on the ground.

=== Breeding ===
Nothing is known about the ochre-browed thistletail's breeding biology.

=== Vocalization ===
The ochre-browed thistletail's song is "a dry, rattling trill [that] decelerates at end, 'pipipi-pi-pi-pi-pi-pi-pi-pi-pi, pi, pi, pi, pt, pt' ". Its calls include "a high-pitched, nasal 'meeeow', [a] squeaky, rodent-like 'peeeap' [and] a high 'péé-d-deet' ".

== Status ==
The IUCN has assessed the ochre-browed thistletail as being of Least Concern. It has a very small range and an unknown population size; the latter is believed to be stable. The principal threat is the habitat changes expected as a result of climate change. It is considered uncommon to fairly common but the "[l]inear nature of habitat occupied suggests that its total population is rather small".
