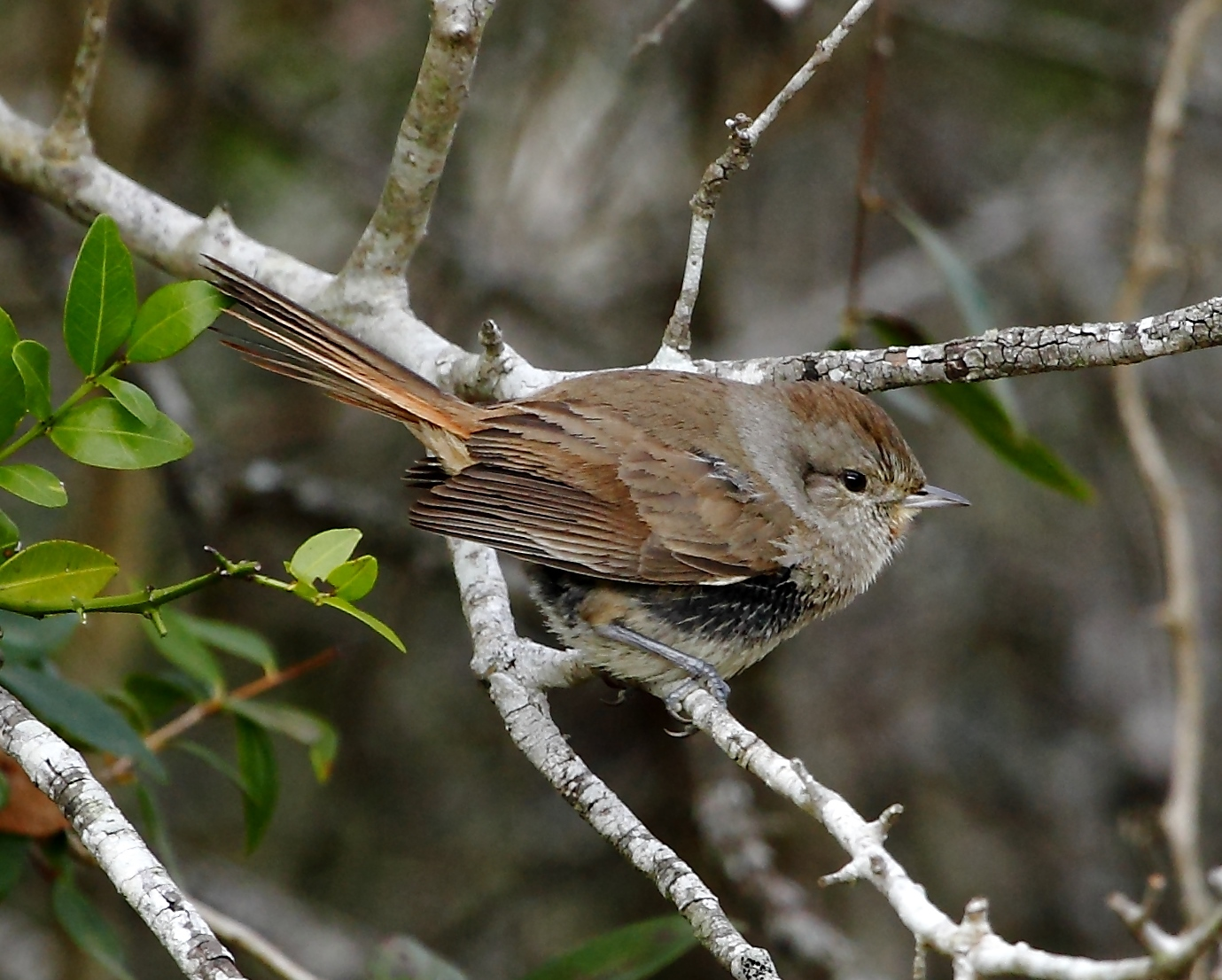

Conservation status
- Least Concern (IUCN 3.1)

Scientific classification
- Kingdom: Animalia
- Phylum: Chordata
- Class: Aves
- Order: Passeriformes
- Family: Furnariidae
- Genus: Asthenes
- Species: A. baeri

Binomial name
- Asthenes baeri (Berlepsch, 1906)

Subspecies
- See text

= Short-billed canastero =

Species of bird

The short-billed canastero (Asthenes baeri) is a species of bird in the Furnariinae subfamily of the ovenbird family Furnariidae. It is found in Argentina, Bolivia, Brazil, Paraguay, and Uruguay.

== Taxonomy and systematics ==
The short-billed canastero's taxonomy is unsettled. The International Ornithological Committee (IOC) and BirdLife International's Handbook of the Birds of the World (HBW) assign it three subspecies, the nominate A. b. baeri (Berlepsch, 1906), A. b. chacoensis (Brodkorb, 1938), and A. b. neiffi (Contreras, 1980). The Clements taxonomy does not recognize neiffi, assessing it as a clinal variant of chacoensis.

This article follows the three-subspecies model.

== Description ==
The short-billed canastero is 14 to 15 cm (5.5 to 5.9 in) long and weighs 10 to 18 g (0.35 to 0.63 oz). It has a short and thick bill, and is more similar to the wholly unrelated little thornbird (Phacellodomus sibilatrix) than to other canasteros. The sexes have the same plumage. Adults of the nominate subspecies have an indistinct wide grayish supercilium on an otherwise dull grayish brown face. Their crown is dull gray-brown, their back a slightly grayer brown, and their rump and uppertail coverts gray with a brown tinge. Their wings are mostly dull grayish brown with paler gray edges on the coverts and flight feathers. Their tail's innermost two pairs of feathers are mostly dark brownish fuscous and the rest mostly dull rufous. Their chin is pale grayish, their upper throat orange-tawny with a darker lower margin, and their lower throat, breast, and belly pale dull grayish. Their flanks and undertail coverts are pale rufescent. Their iris is brown to grayish brown, their maxilla black to dark gray or dark brown, their mandible gray to pinkish gray, and their legs and feet gray to brownish gray. Juveniles have little or no orange-tawny on the throat and a mottled upper breast. Subspecies A. b. chacoensis is very slightly paler than the nominate and has a whiter supercilium and more rufous on the tail. A. b. neiffi is described as significantly larger than the other two subspecies but differs little in plumage from chacoensis.

== Distribution and habitat ==
The nominate subspecies of the short-billed canastero is found in southern Bolivia, western Paraguay, central Argentina, extreme southeastern Brazil, and western Uruguay. Subspecies A. b. chacoensis is found in extreme south-central Bolivia and northwestern Paraguay. A. b. neiffi is found in western Argentina. The species inhabits arid lowland scrublands, Gran Chaco scrub and woodlands, and woodlands of the Monte Desert. In elevation it ranges from sea level to 1,300 m (4,300 ft).

== Behavior ==
=== Movement ===
The short-billed canastero is a year-round resident throughout its range.

=== Feeding ===
The short-billed canastero feeds on a wide variety of arthropods. It forages singly or in pairs, apparently capturing prey by gleaning low vegetation and to a lesser extent on the ground.

=== Breeding ===
The short-billed canastero breeds in the austral spring and summer, including at least October to January. It is thought to be monogamous. It builds an oval nest of spiny branches up to 35 cm (14 in) wide and 20 cm (8 in) tall, placed 1 to 3 m (3 to 10 ft) high in the fork of a tree or bush. Its entrance is on the top and a tunnel leads to the nest chamber, which is floored with feathers, hair, flowers, moss, and other soft material. The clutch size is usually three eggs but can be as many as five. The incubation period is 14 to 15.5 days and fledging occurs about 14 days after hatch.

=== Vocalization ===
The short-billed canastero's song is "a high-pitched, fast seep seep seepseepseep..., speeding up to and ending in a trill". Sometimes the introductory notes are omitted. It also gives a "series of short, buzzing 'pzzz' phrases.

== Status ==
The IUCN has assessed the short-billed canastero as being of Least Concern. It has a very large range but an unknown population size that is believed to be decreasing. No immediate threats have been identified. It is considered uncommon to fairly common and occurs in several protected areas. "Habitat occupied by this species is subject to at least moderate disturbance and grazing in large parts of its range."
