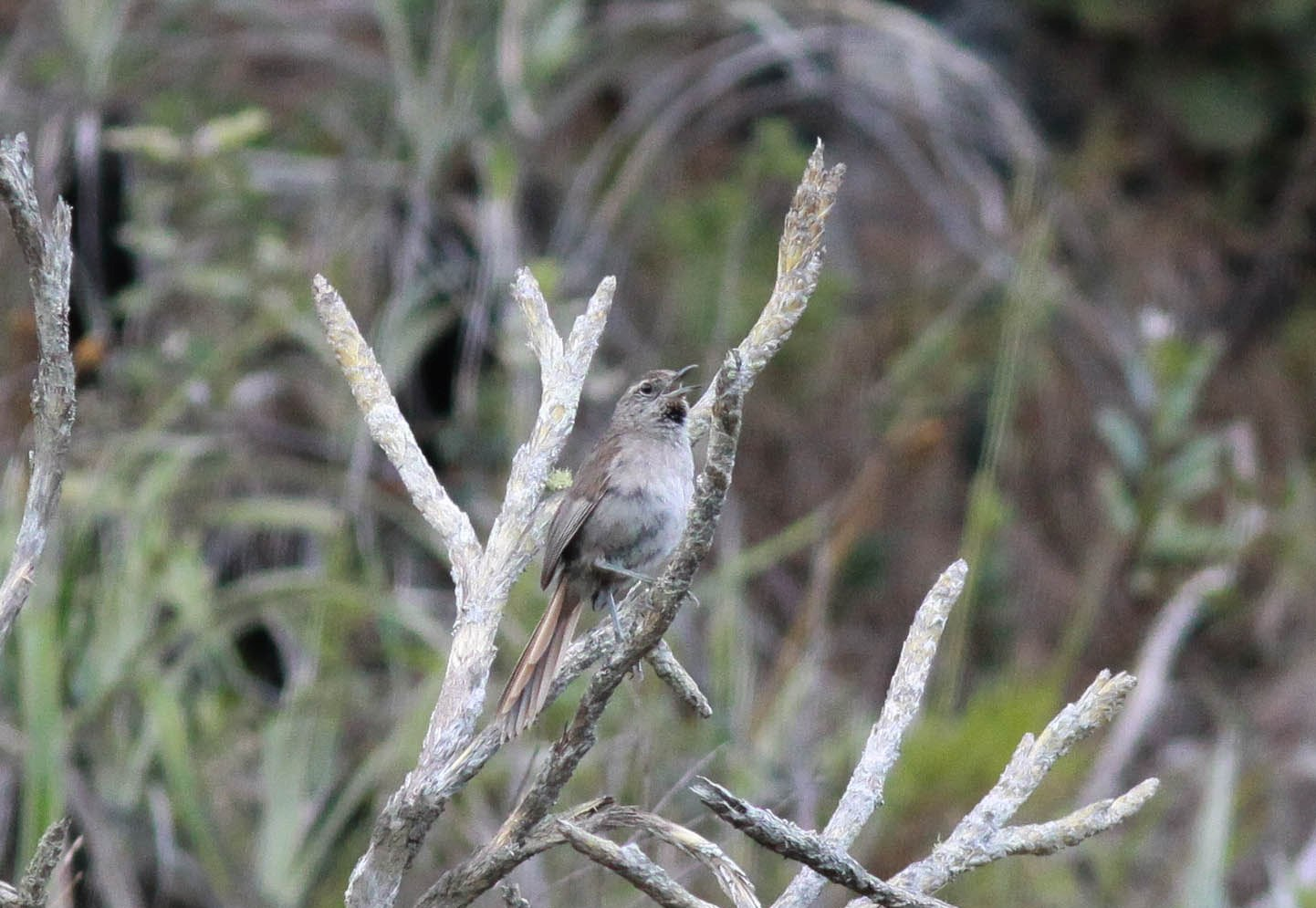

Conservation status
- Near Threatened (IUCN 3.1)

Scientific classification
- Kingdom: Animalia
- Phylum: Chordata
- Class: Aves
- Order: Passeriformes
- Family: Furnariidae
- Genus: Asthenes
- Species: A. luizae

Binomial name
- Asthenes luizae Vielliard, 1990

= Cipo canastero =

Cipó canastero

Species of bird

The Cipo canastero (Asthenes luizae) is a Near Threatened species of bird in the Furnariinae subfamily of the ovenbird family Furnariidae. It is endemic to Brazil.

== Taxonomy and systematics ==
The Cipo canastero was described in 1990 from a specimen collected in December 1985 in the Serra do Cipo. There is some evidence that the species belongs in its own genus.

The Cipo canastero is monotypic.

== Description ==
The Cipo canastero is about 17 cm (6.7 in) long and weighs 25.5 to 30.5 g (0.90 to 1.1 oz). It has a rather short bill and a medium-length tail. The sexes have the same plumage. Adults have narrow whitish supercilium and a dark brown or blackish brown line through the eye on an otherwise gray-brown face with fine blackish streaks. Their crown is warm brown and their back and rump grayish brown. Their wings are mostly dull dark brown with whitish brown edges on some flight feathers. Their tail's innermost pair of feathers are dark brown and the rest chestnut-rufous. Their chin and the center of their upper throat are white with thin black streaks. The sides of their throat and their underparts are gray with a dusky olive wash on the center of the belly and a chestnut wash on their undertail coverts. Their iris is blackish to brown, their maxilla dark gray with a black tip, their mandible dark gray with a paler gray base, and their legs and feet dull pinkish to gray.

== Distribution and habitat ==
The Cipo canastero is found in a few locations in the Espinhaço Mountains of north-central and east-central Minas Gerais, a state in southeastern Brazil. It inhabits areas of rocky outcrops and bushy vegetation in the grasslands of the campos rupestres. In elevation it ranges from 900 to 1,500 m (3,000 to 4,900 ft).

== Behavior ==
=== Movement ===
The Cipo canastero is a year-round resident throughout its range.

=== Feeding ===
The Cipo canastero feeds on arthropods. It forages singly or in pairs, gleaning its prey from rocks and the ground.

=== Breeding ===
The Cipo canastero builds a spherical or cylindrical nest of sticks near the ground in a bush. Nothing else is known about its breeding biology.

=== Vocalization ===
The Cipo canastero's song is a "descending series of about 12 notes 'tseeptseep---' ". Its call is a "high 'tjip' ".

== Status ==
The IUCN originally in 1994 assessed the Cipo canastero as Endangered, then in 2004 as Vulnerable, and since 2011 as Near Threatened. It has a small range with discontinuous habitat and an estimated population of 10,600 mature individuals that is believed to be decreasing. "Brood parasitism by the recently introduced Shiny Cowbird (Molothrus bonariensis) is thought to be the most serious current threat and the main cause of the species's ongoing decline." Frequent fires in the dry season are also a potentially serious threat especially with the expected increased dryness due to climate change. In addition, "[m]ore than 40% of the species's habitat is currently either directly or indirectly affected by mining." It is fairly common in some locales and occurs in at least two national parks. "[D]iscovery of this species in Mar 2000 at Campina do Bananal, 170 km N of other known localities and N of Jequitinhonha Valley, gives cause for optimism."
