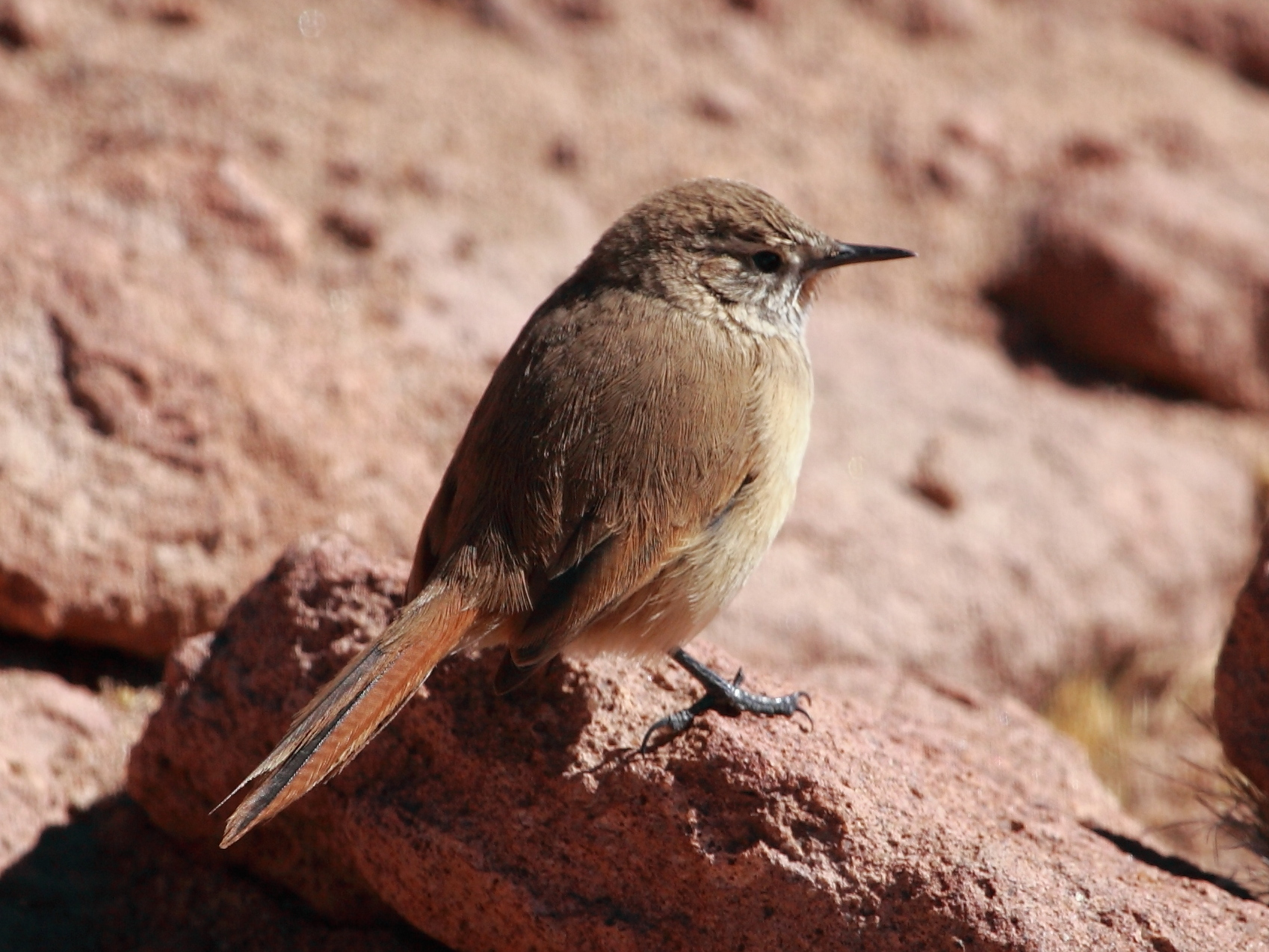
- at San Pedro de Atacama, Antofagasta Region, Chile

Conservation status
- Least Concern (IUCN 3.1)

Scientific classification
- Kingdom: Animalia
- Phylum: Chordata
- Class: Aves
- Order: Passeriformes
- Family: Furnariidae
- Genus: Asthenes
- Species: A. modesta

Binomial name
- Asthenes modesta (Eyton, 1852)

Subspecies
- See text

= Cordilleran canastero =

Species of bird

The cordilleran canastero (Asthenes modesta) is a species of bird in the Furnariinae subfamily of the ovenbird family Furnariidae. It is found in Argentina, Bolivia, Chile, and Peru.

== Taxonomy and systematics ==
The cordilleran canastero's taxonomy is unsettled. The International Ornithological Committee (IOC) and BirdLife International's Handbook of the Birds of the World (HBW) assign it these seven subspecies:

- A. m. proxima (Chapman, 1921)
- A. m. modesta (Eyton, 1852)
- A. m. hilereti (Oustalet, 1904)
- A. m. rostrata (von Berlepsch, 1901)
- A. m. serrana Nores, 1986
- A. m. cordobae Nores & Yzurieta, 1980
- A. m. australis Hellmayr, 1925

An eighth subspecies, A. m. navasi, has been proposed but cannot be differentiated from A. m. australis. The Clements taxonomy does not recognize A. m. hilereti and A. m. cordobae. It includes hilereti within modesta and cordobae within serrana.

This article follows the seven-subspecies model.

== Description ==
The cordilleran canastero is 15 to 16 cm (5.9 to 6.3 in) long and weighs 13 to 22 g (0.46 to 0.78 oz). It is one of the smaller canasteros. The sexes have the same plumage. Adults of the nominate subspecies A. m. modesta have a narrow light buff-brown supercilium, dark brownish lores, brownish ear coverts, and a whitish buff-brown malar region with darker brown streaks. Their crown, nape, back, rump, and uppertail coverts are dull dark brown, though the back is paler and sandier in the southern part of the species' range. Their forehead has indistinct blackish spots and their rump and uppertail coverts have a rufescent tinge. Their wing coverts are dark brownish with chestnut-rufous edges, the greater covers dark brownish with fulvous or tawny edges, and their flight feathers dark fuscous with rufous bases. Their central pair of tail feathers are pointed and dark fuscous with rufous outer webs. The rest of their tail feathers have increasing amounts of rufous to the outermost, which are almost entirely that color. Their chin and upper throat are pale brownish with an orange-rufous patch in the center, their lower throat and upper breast whitish gray-brown with darker streaks, their lower breast and belly pale brown, and their flanks and undertail coverts pale brown with a rufescent tinge. Their iris is brown to dark brown, their maxilla black to dark brownish horn, their mandible horn to brownish gray with a dark tip, and their legs and feet blackish gray to dusky brown. Juveniles do not have the orange-rufous throat patch and their breast and belly are mottled.

The other subspecies of the cordilleran canastero differ from the nominate and each other thus:

- A. m. proxima: darker back than nominate and tawny-rufous (not intense rufous) on the tail feathers
- A. m. rostrata: darker upperparts and central tail feathers than nominate, and darker rufous in the wings
- A. m. hilereti: grayer back than nominate and rostrata
- A. m. serrana: paler and grayer underparts than nominate, but with an ochraceous tinge
- A. m. cordobae: darker and less cinnamon upperparts and less cinnamon underparts than nominate, and darkest wings and tail of all subspecies
- A. m. australis: grayer upperparts and paler and less buffy underparts than nominate, with less rufescent wing coverts

== Distribution and habitat ==
The subspecies of the cordilleran canastero are found thus:

- A. m. proxima: Andes of central and southern Peru from the Department of Junín to the Department of Cuzco
- A. m. modesta: Andes of southwestern Peru and western Bolivia south into northern Chile and northwestern Argentina
- A. m. hilereti: Tucumán and Catamarca provinces in northwestern Argentina
- A. m. rostrata: eastern slope of Andes in the central Bolivian departments of La Paz and Cochabamba
- A. m. serrana: Sierra de Famatina in western Argentina's La Rioja Province
- A. m. cordobae: central Argentina
- A. m. australis: Andes and lowlands of central and southern Chile and western and southern Argentina

The cordilleran canastero primarily inhabits puna, temperate, and arid to semi-humid grasslands, often those with rocky outcrops and scattered small bushes. It also occurs in arid montane scrublands, Polylepis thickets, and dry open woodlands. In elevation it ranges from near sea level to 4,500 m (14,800 ft).

== Behavior ==
=== Movement ===
The cordilleran canastero is a year-round resident throughout its range.

=== Feeding ===
The cordilleran canastero feeds on arthropods. It usually forages singly but sometimes in pairs, gleaning prey mostly from the ground and to a lesser extent from low vegetation.

=== Breeding ===
The cordilleran canastero breeds in the austral spring and summer, roughly October to March. It is believed to be monogamous. It weaves a cylidrical or spherical nest from twigs (often thorny ones) with a side entrance, and lines the nest chamber with feathers and hair. It places it in a variety of locations including a rock crevice, a bush, a hole in a dirt bank, and another bird's abandoned nest. The clutch size is two to four eggs. The incubation period, time to fledging, and details of parental care are not known.

=== Vocalization ===
The cordilleran canastero's song is "an ascending fast trill that ends abruptly". It also makes a "more complex trill with introductory notes". Its calls are "a short, low 'pyup' or 'tjit' ".

== Status ==
The IUCN has assessed the cordilleran canastero as being of Least Concern. It has an extremely large range and an unknown population size that is believed to be decreasing. No immediate threats have been identified. It is considered fairly common to common in much of its range. The "[h]abitat occupied by this species is generally subjected to at least moderate overgrazing".
