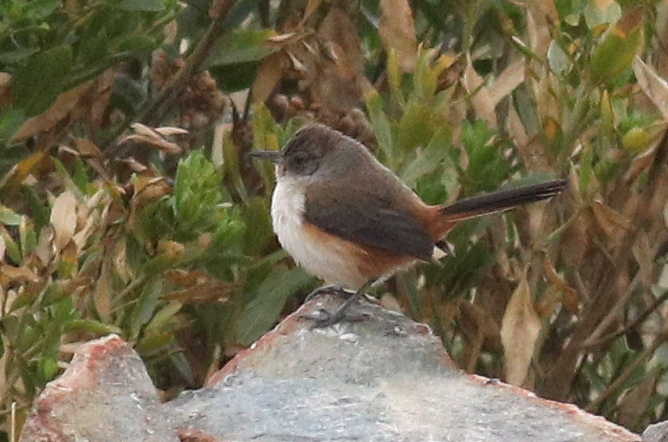

Conservation status
- Least Concern (IUCN 3.1)

Scientific classification
- Kingdom: Animalia
- Phylum: Chordata
- Class: Aves
- Order: Passeriformes
- Family: Furnariidae
- Genus: Asthenes
- Species: A. arequipae

Binomial name
- Asthenes arequipae (Sclater, PL & Salvin, 1869)

Synonyms
- Asthenes dorbignyi arequipae

= Dark-winged canastero =

Species of bird

The dark-winged canastero, or Arequipa canastero, (Asthenes arequipae) is a species of bird in the Furnariinae subfamily of the ovenbird family Furnariidae. It is found in Bolivia, Chile, and Peru.

== Taxonomy and systematics ==
The dark-winged canastero's taxonomy is unsettled. The International Ornithological Committee (IOC) and BirdLife International's Handbook of the Birds of the World (HBW) treat it as a monotypic species, though HBW uses the English name "Arequipa canastero". The South American Classification Committee of the American Ornithological Society and the Clements taxonomy treat it as a subspecies of the rusty-vented canastero (A. dorbignyi), which they call the "creamy-breasted canastero". To further complicate matters, these taxa have plumage, morphological, vocal, behavioral, and nest structure characteristics that may better place them in the thornbird genus Phacellodomus rather than Asthenes.

The dark-winged canastero was originally described in the genus Synallaxis.

== Description ==
The dark-winged canastero is 14.5 to 16.5 cm (5.7 to 6.5 in) long and weighs 17.5 to 24 g (0.62 to 0.85 oz). It is a medium-sized canastero. The sexes have the same plumage. Adults have a light gray supercilium and an indistinct brownish line behind the eye in an otherwise dull buff face. Their crown, nape, and back are medium to dark brown and their rump and uppertail coverts rufous brown. Their wing coverts are blackish with narrow rufous edges and their flight feathers blackish. Their tail's outermost pair of feathers are rufous and the rest blackish. The center of their throat is orange rufous. The sides of their throat, breast, and belly are creamy white, their flanks tawny rufous, and their undertail coverts rufous. Their iris is dark brown to light gray, their maxilla black or dark gray, their mandible blackish (often with a pinkish base), and their legs and feet blue-gray to black. Juveniles have an entirely white throat and faint dusky bars or mottling on the breast and belly.

== Distribution and habitat ==
The dark-winged canastero is found from southwestern Peru's Department of Arequipa south into northern Chile as far as the Tarapacá Region and east into western Bolivia's La Paz and Oruro departments. It inhabits arid landscapes, especially scrublands and nearby woodlands.

== Behavior ==
=== Movement ===
The dark-winged canastero is a year-round resident throughout its range.

=== Feeding ===
The dark-winged canastero's diet has not been detailed but is known to be mostly arthropods and include seeds. It forages on the ground and in low woody vegetation, usually singly or in pairs, and gleaning for its prey.

=== Breeding ===
The dark-winged canastero's nest is a globular mass of sticks, some of which are thorny, with an entrance near the top or on the side and a tunnel to the nest chamber. The nest may be up to 75 cm (30 in) long. The chamber is lined with wool, feathers, and soft plant material. The nest is often built in a Polylepis tree and less commonly in a shrub or on a columnar cactus. Both sexes build the nest. The species is thought to be monogamous. Small family groups roost in nests year-round. Nothing else is known about its breeding biology.

=== Vocalization ===
The dark-winged canastero's song "may begin with a series of introductory notes, but these apparently are not always given. The song then...accelerates and ascends, before descending and decelerating near the end". Its call has been described as a "wheezy, earthcreeper-like whee" and as a "rising, penetrating shreep! or whee". It usually sings from atop a bush or small tree.

== Status ==
The IUCN has assessed the dark-winged canastero as being of Least Concern. It has a large range but an unknown population size that is believed to be decreasing. No immediate threats have been identified. It is considered fairly common to common over most of its range. "The primary effect of human activity on the [rusty vented canastero] is to reduce habitat area or quality, through clearing of habitat."
