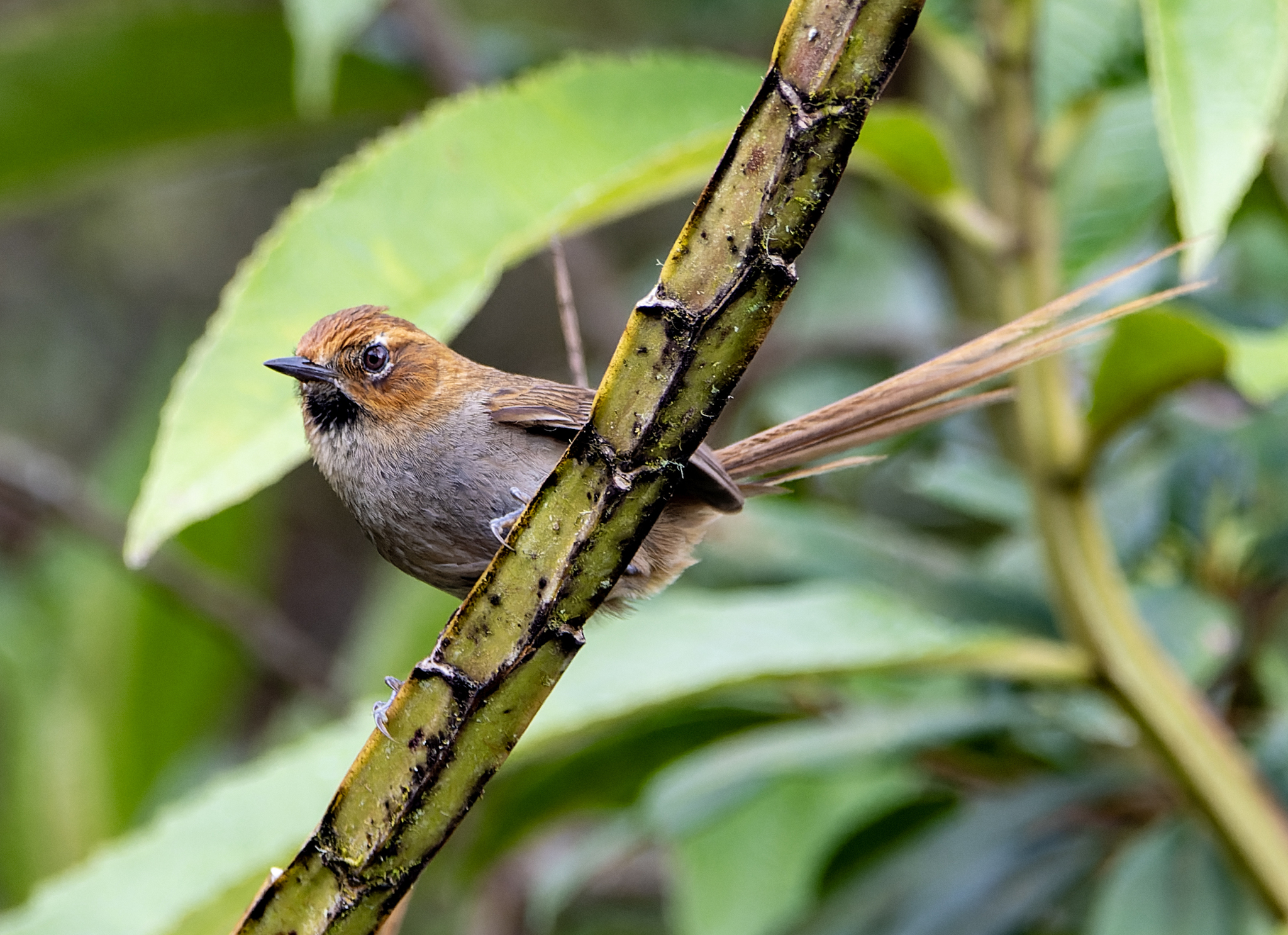

Conservation status
- Least Concern (IUCN 3.1)

Scientific classification
- Kingdom: Animalia
- Phylum: Chordata
- Class: Aves
- Order: Passeriformes
- Family: Furnariidae
- Genus: Asthenes
- Species: A. harterti

Binomial name
- Asthenes harterti (Berlepsch, 1901)

Subspecies
- See text
- Range within Bolivia

Synonyms
- Schizoeaca harterti

= Black-throated thistletail =

Species of bird

The black-throated thistletail (Asthenes harterti) is a species of bird in the Furnariinae subfamily of the ovenbird family Furnariidae. It is endemic to Bolivia.

== Taxonomy and systematics ==
The black-throated thistletail and eight other species were previously placed in genus Schizoeaca but genetic data showed that the genus is embedded within Asthenes. Some authors considered all of those taxa to be conspecific but the genetic data confirm they are separate species.

According to the International Ornithological Committee, the black-throated thistletail has two subspecies, the nominate A. h. harterti (Berlepsch, 1901) and A. h. bejaranoi (Remsen, 1981). The Clements taxonomy treats it as monotypic. This article follows the two-subspecies model.

== Description ==
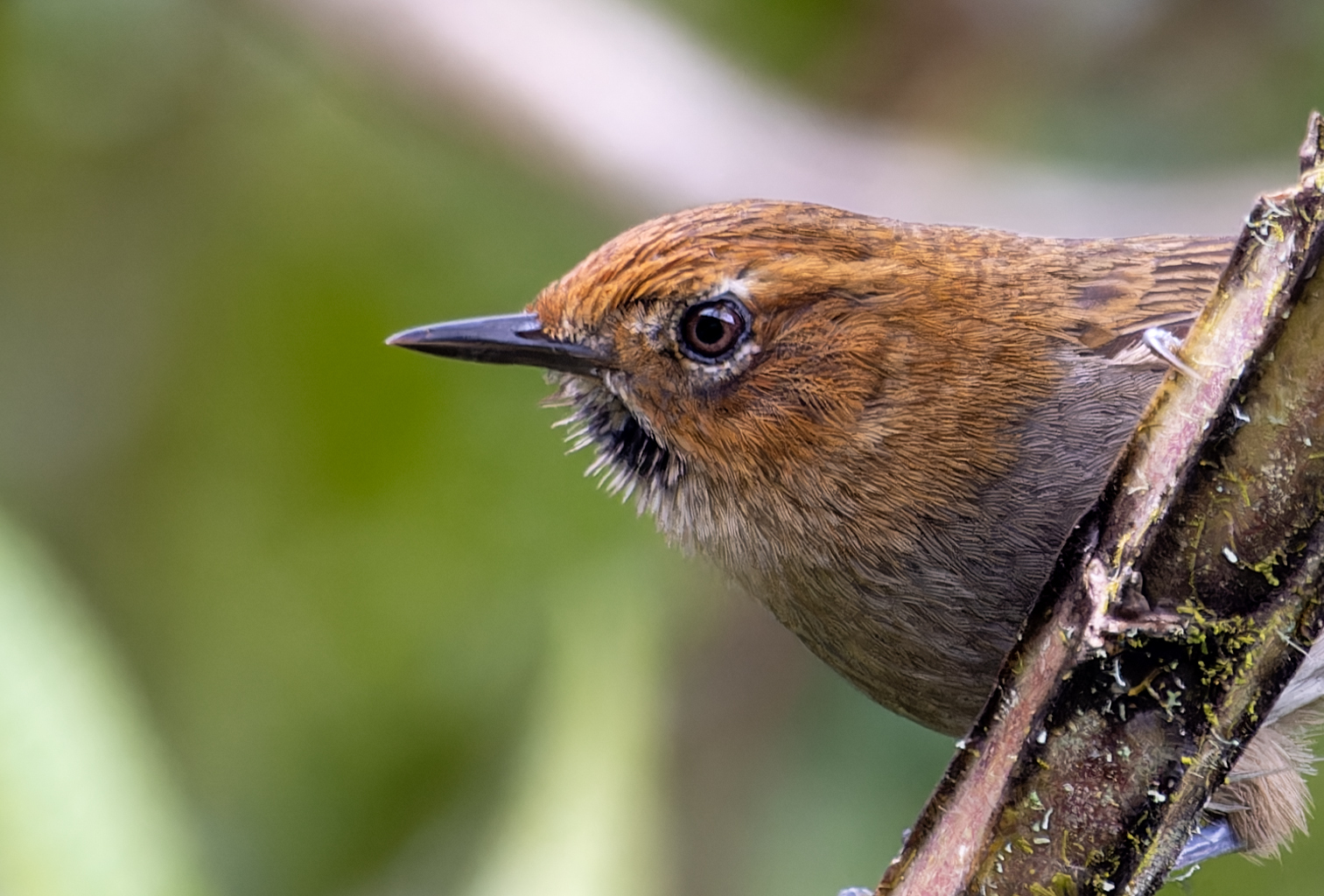
Closeup picture of a black-throated thistletail.

The black-throated thistletail is 17 to 18 cm (6.7 to 7.1 in) long and weighs 12 to 14 g (0.42 to 0.49 oz). The sexes have the same plumage. Adults of the nominate subspecies have a rufous-brown face with a light brown supercilium. Their crown, back, rump, wings, and tail are dark rufescent brown. Their tail is long and deeply forked with few barbs at the feather ends. Their chin is grayish white and their throat black with whitish streaks. Their underparts are mostly brownish gray with browner flanks and undertail coverts. Their iris is light brown to brown, their maxilla blackish to dark gray, their mandible gray to pinkish gray with a dark tip, and their legs and feet blue-gray to gray. Subspecies A. h. bejaranoi differs from the nominate by having some ochraceous on the face and neck, and paler underparts with ochraceous sides and flanks.

== Distribution and habitat ==
The black-throated thistletail is found only in the Andes of western Bolivia, in the departments of La Paz, Cochabamba, and Santa Cruz. The nominate subspecies is the more northerly of the two. The species inhabits páramo grasslands, elfin forest, the ecotone at tree line, and the edge of cloudforest. In elevation it ranges between 2,900 and 3,400 m (9,500 and 11,200 ft).

== Behavior ==
=== Movement ===
The black-throated thistletail is a year-round resident throughout its range.

=== Feeding ===
The black-throated thistletail feeds mostly on arthropods, and seeds are a small part of its diet. It forages singly or in pairs, usually in the understory though sometimes higher. It takes its prey by gleaning mostly from foliage and small branches and also moss, grass, and rocks.

=== Breeding ===
The black-throated thistletail's breeding season has not been defined but includes at least January. It is thought to be monogamous. The one known nest was an oval mass with a side entrance, constructed of moss and a few twigs and placed on a clump of grass. The clutch size is thought to be two eggs. Both sexes provision nestlings but further details of the species' breeding biology are not known.

=== Vocalization ===
The black-throated thistletail's song is "a series of emphatic squeaky notes, accelerating and then slowing, descending slightly at end". Its alarm call is a "rodent-like 'pseea' ".

== Status ==
The IUCN has assessed the black-throated thistletail as being of Least Concern. It has a restricted range and an unknown population size that is believed to be decreasing. No immediate threats have been identified. It is considered fairly common to common but having a "rather small" population. "Burning and grazing of timber-line habitats has greatly reduced the extent of appropriate habitat for this species."
