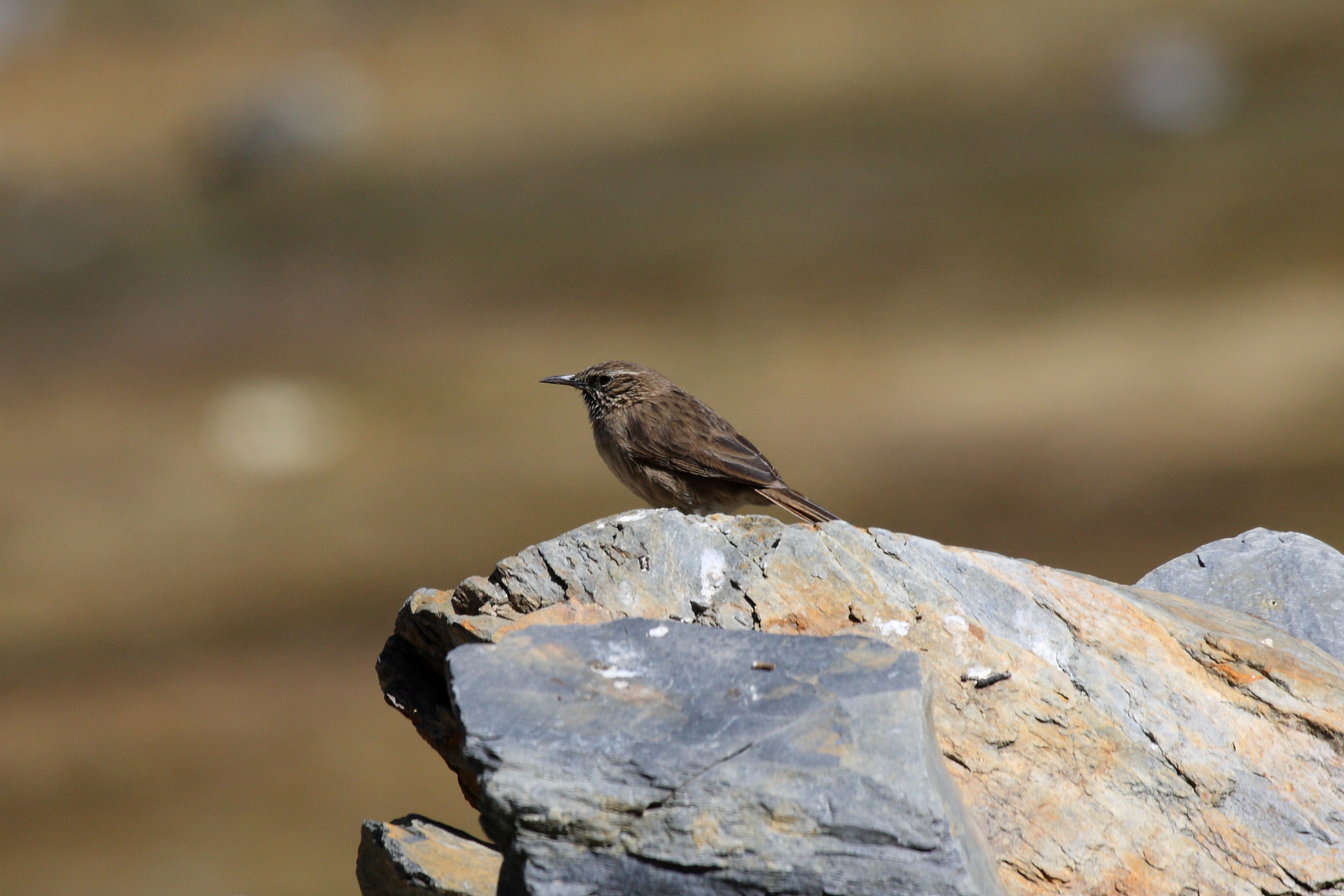

Conservation status
- Least Concern (IUCN 3.1)

Scientific classification
- Kingdom: Animalia
- Phylum: Chordata
- Class: Aves
- Order: Passeriformes
- Family: Furnariidae
- Genus: Asthenes
- Species: A. humilis

Binomial name
- Asthenes humilis (Cabanis, 1873)

Subspecies
- See text

= Streak-throated canastero =

Species of bird

The streak-throated canastero (Asthenes humilis) is a species of bird in the Furnariinae subfamily of the ovenbird family Furnariidae. It is found in Bolivia and Peru.

== Taxonomy and systematics ==
The streak-throated canastero has three subspecies, the nominate A. h. humilis (Cabanis, 1873), A. h. cajamarcae (Zimmer, JT, 1936), and A. h. robusta (von Berlepsch, 1901).

== Description ==
The streak-throated canastero is 15 to 16 cm (5.9 to 6.3 in) long and weighs 23 to 24 g (0.81 to 0.85 oz). The sexes have the same plumage. Adults of the nominate subspecies have a dull whitish buff supercilium, dark brownish lores, and a vague brownish streak behind the eye on an otherwise dark brown and grayish buff streaked face. Their crown is dull dark brown with faint darker streaks and small blackish dots on the forehead. Their back, rump, and uppertail coverts are dull dark brown with faint darker streaks on the back that become longer and wider towards the rump. Their wings are mostly dull dark brownish with some rufous on the coverts and rufescent edges on some secondaries. Their tail is dark brown with tawny-buff edges on the feather's outer webs. Their chin is orange-rufous, their throat and breast pale brown, their belly a paler brown, and their flanks and undertail coverts a warmer brownish buff. Their throat has thin blackish streaks that disappear on the upper breast. Their iris is brown, their maxilla black to dark horn, their mandible blackish to gray with a black tip, and their legs and feet grayish olive to brownish gray. Juveniles have little or no orange and less distinct streaks on the throat and some rufous on the tail.

Subspecies A. h. cajamarcae has grayer upperparts than the nominate, with more distinct streaks, and has paler and less buffy underparts. A. h. robusta has a darker back with less distinct streaks than the nominate. A subpopulation in the Peruvian Andes has a clay-pinkish wash to the undersides and might represent another subspecies or species.

== Distribution and habitat ==
The streak-throated canastero is a bird of the Peruvian and Bolivian Andes, and has a disjunct distribution. Subspecies A. h. cajamarcae is the northernmost. It is found in Peru's Department of Cajamarca. The nominate subspecies is found in Peru from La Libertad and Ancash departments south to the departments of Huancavelica and Ayacucho. A. h. robusta is found from the Department of Cuzco in Peru south into northern Bolivia's La Paz and Cochabamba departments. The species inhabits puna grassland, often areas with rocky outcrops and sometimes those with scattered bushes. In elevation it ranges from 2,750 to 4,800 m (9,000 to 15,700 ft).

== Behavior ==
=== Movement ===
The streak-throated canastero is mostly a year-round resident throughout its range but has been noted moving downslope in the southern Andes to avoid snowstorms.

=== Feeding ===
The streak-throated canastero feeds on arthropods and seeds. It forages singly or in pairs, gleaning prey from the ground and bunches of grass.

=== Breeding ===
The streak-throated canastero is assumed to breed in the austral spring and summer. It is thought to be monogamous. It makes a ball-shaped nest of grass with a side entrance and a lining of feathers, hair, and soft plant material. It typically places it on the ground in a clump of bunch grass. Nothing else is known about the species' breeding biology.

=== Vocalization ===
The streak-throated canastero's vocalizations are not well known. What is thought to be its song is "a quavering, soft trill 2–5 seconds in duration". It also makes a "doubled or tripled trill that lasts c. 1 second". Its contact call is "a burst of 'pit' notes, usually repeated 2–3 times".

== Status ==
The IUCN has assessed the streak-throated canastero as being of Least Concern. It has a fairly large range, and though its population size is not known it is believed to be stable. No immediate threats have been identified. It is considered fairly common to common in much of its range and "[t]olerates at least moderate grazing".
