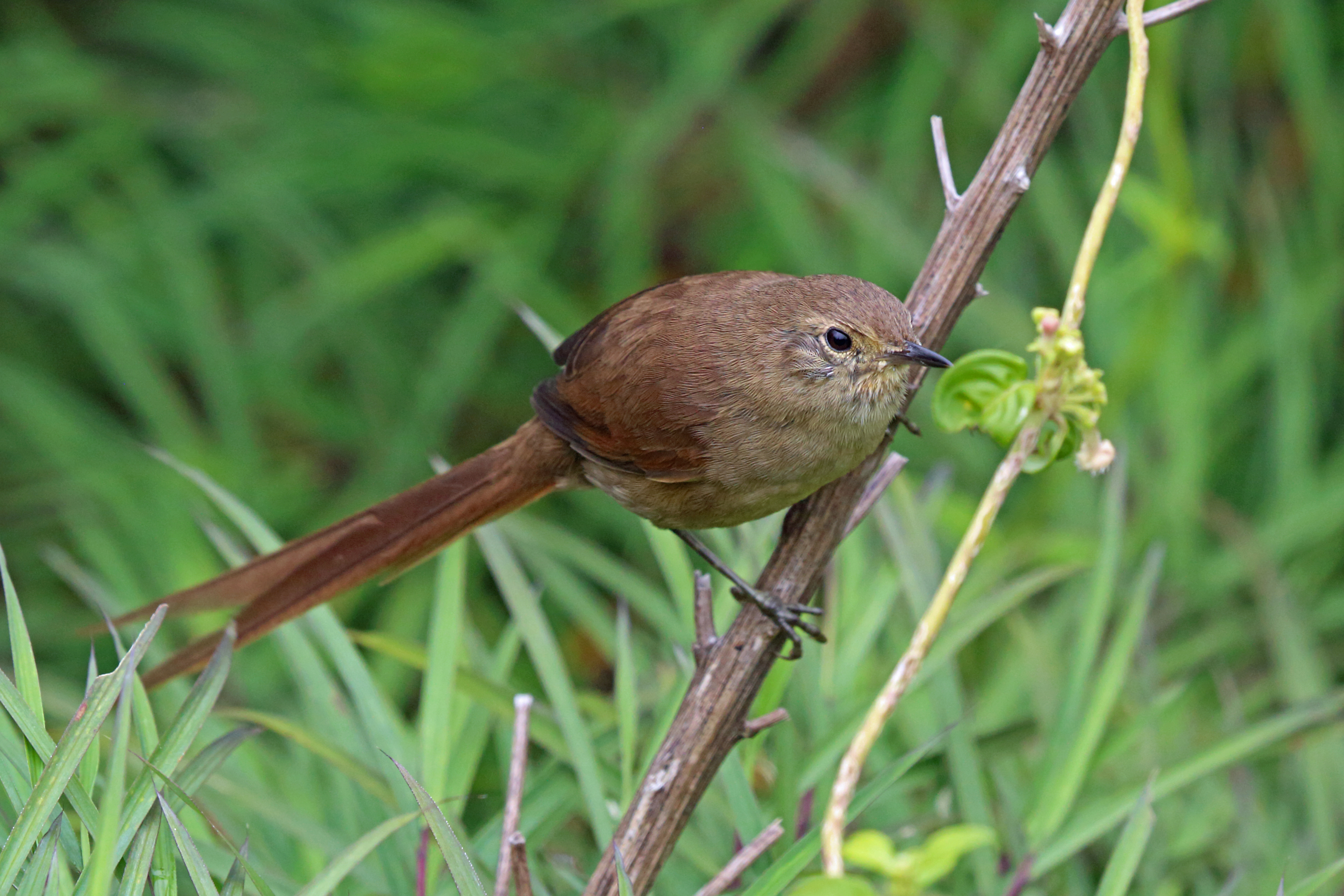

Conservation status
- Least Concern (IUCN 3.1)

Scientific classification
- Kingdom: Animalia
- Phylum: Chordata
- Class: Aves
- Order: Passeriformes
- Family: Furnariidae
- Genus: Asthenes
- Species: A. moreirae

Binomial name
- Asthenes moreirae (Miranda-Ribeiro, 1905)

Synonyms
- Oreophylax moreirae; Schizoeaca moreirae

= Itatiaia spinetail =

Species of bird in Brazil

The Itatiaia spinetail (Asthenes moreirae), also known as the Itatiaia thistletail, is a species of bird in the Furnariinae subfamily of the ovenbird family Furnariidae. It is endemic to southeastern Brazil.

== Taxonomy and systematics ==
The Itatiaia spinetail was long placed in the monotypic genus Oreophylax and by some authors in Schizoeaca, but genetic data published in 2011 places it and all other members of Schizoeaca firmly in Asthenes. It has no subspecies.

== Description ==
The Itatiaia spinetail is 18 to 19 cm (7.1 to 7.5 in) long and weighs 10 to 11 g (0.35 to 0.39 oz). It is one of the smaller members of its genus. The sexes have the same plumage. Adults have a mostly dull brown face, sometimes with a faint paler eyering. Their crown, upperparts, wings, and tail are uniformly dark brown. Their tail feathers lack most barbs at the end, giving them a spiny appearance. Their chin and throat are pale dingy buff with a tawny ochraceous patch in the center of the latter. Their underparts are pale buffy brown that is palest in the center of the belly and browner on the flanks. Their iris is brown, their maxilla blackish, their mandible brownish horn, and their legs and feet dark grayish. Juveniles have a smaller throat patch than adults and their breast has some brown barring.

== Distribution and habitat ==
The Itatiaia spinetail is found in the mountains of southeastern Brazil's Minas Gerais, São Paulo, Rio de Janeiro, and Espírito Santo states. It is named for Serra do Itatiaia and also occurs in Serra do Caraça and Serra dos Órgãos. It inhabits semi-humid to humid montane scrublands, Chusquea bamboo thickets, and areas of tall grass near scrub. It usually occurs above tree line, from 1,850 to 2,800 m (6,100 to 9,200 ft).

== Behavior ==
=== Movement ===
The Itatiaia spinetail is a year-round resident throughout its range.

=== Feeding ===
The Itatiaia spinetail feeds mostly on arthropods but also includes small fruits in its diet. It usually forages in pairs, sometimes in groups of three, staying near the ground. It gleans prey from foliage and branches and sometimes is quite acrobatic when foraging.

=== Breeding ===
The Itatiaia spinetail makes an oval nest of moss with some twigs around the outside and an entrance near the top. Nothing else is known about its breeding biology.

=== Vocalization ===
The Itatiaia spinetail's song is an "accelerating series of extr. high, slightly rising notes 'you-tee-wiwiwiwi' ". Its call is a "low 'piuw' ".

== Status ==
The IUCN has assessed the Itatiaia spinetail as being of Least Concern. It has a restricted range and an unknown population size that is believed to be decreasing. Stresses to its habitat due to climate change are expected to adversely affect the species. It is considered uncommon to locally fairly common and occurs in two national parks. "Burning of timber-line ecotone vegetation a major threat".
