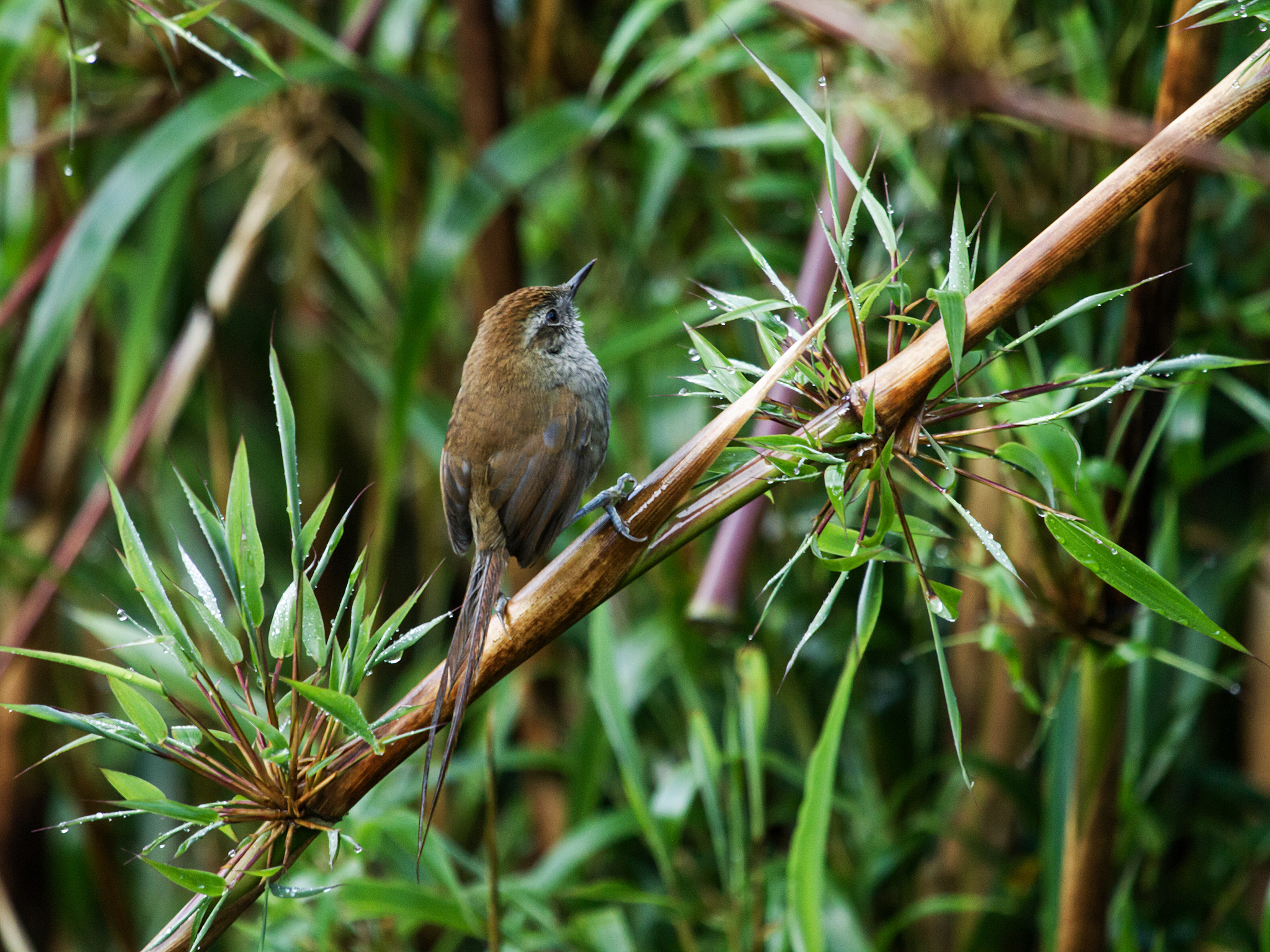

Conservation status
- Least Concern (IUCN 3.1)

Scientific classification
- Kingdom: Animalia
- Phylum: Chordata
- Class: Aves
- Order: Passeriformes
- Family: Furnariidae
- Genus: Asthenes
- Species: A. helleri

Binomial name
- Asthenes helleri (Chapman, 1923)

Synonyms
- Schizoeaca helleri

= Puna thistletail =

Species of bird

The puna thistletail (Asthenes helleri) is a species of bird in the Furnariinae subfamily of the ovenbird family Furnariidae. It is found in Peru and far-western Bolivia.

== Taxonomy and systematics ==
The puna thistletail and eight other species were previously placed in genus Schizoeaca but genetic data showed that the genus is embedded within Asthenes. Some authors considered all of those taxa to be conspecific but the genetic data confirm they are separate species.

The puna thistletail is monotypic. However, the population in the southern part of the species' range might qualify as a subspecies.

== Description ==
The puna thistletail is 17 to 18.5 cm (6.7 to 7.3 in) long and weighs 13 to 17 g (0.46 to 0.60 oz). The sexes have the same plumage. Adults have a brownish gray face with a grayish supercilium. Their crown is dark rufescent-brown with a grayer forehead. Their back, rump, and wings are dark rufescent brown. Their tail is a brighter rufescent brown; it is long and deeply forked with few barbs at the feather ends. Their chin is white, in some areas with a small rufous center. Their throat has a blackish patch with pale gray flecks. Their underparts are mostly gray with a brownish tinge on the flanks and undertail coverts. Their iris is brownish gray, gray, or pale tan, their maxilla black to gray, their mandible gray to whitish with a dark tip, and their legs and feet gray to bluish gray.

== Distribution and habitat ==
The puna thistletail is found from Peru's Department of Cuzco southeast into Bolivia's La Paz Department. It inhabits elfin forest at the tree line ecotone, usually areas with a dense understory of Chusquea bamboo. In elevation it ranges between 2,700 and 3,700 m (8,900 and 12,100 ft).

== Behavior ==
=== Movement ===
The puna thistletail is a year-round resident throughout its range.

=== Feeding ===
The puna thistletail is thought to feed mostly on arthropods. It forages singly or in pairs, usually in the understory though sometimes higher. It takes its prey by gleaning from foliage, small branches, and moss.

=== Breeding ===
The puna thistletail's breeding season has not been defined but includes at least October. It is thought to be monogamous. The nest is a domed mass with a side entrance, constructed of moss and a few twigs and placed on a clump of grass. The clutch size at known nests was two eggs. Nothing else is known about the species' breeding biology.

=== Vocalization ===
The puna thistletail is highly vocal. Their song, sung by both sexes, is "a short, rapid high-pitched series of spluttering notes, pee-peep-p-p-p-t-t-tii...that accelerates and increases in volume before fading at the end". Its call is "a sharp pyeek, preek, peent or feet note".

== Status ==
The IUCN originally assessed the puna thistletail as being of Least Concern, then in 2012 as Vulnerable, and then in 2021 again as of Least concern. It has a large but narrow range and an unknown population size that is believed to be stable. "The primary threat to this species is the loss of its habitat through deforestation. It has probably always had a relatively small population, but it may be susceptible to the impacts of grazing and burning in its Andean timberline habitat." The species occurs in at least two protected areas in Peru.
