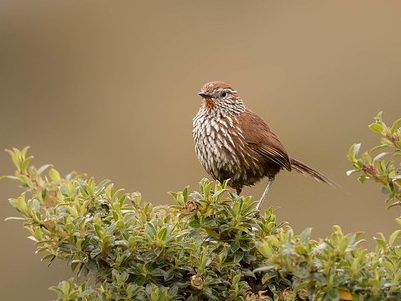

Conservation status
- Near Threatened (IUCN 3.1)

Scientific classification
- Kingdom: Animalia
- Phylum: Chordata
- Class: Aves
- Order: Passeriformes
- Family: Furnariidae
- Genus: Asthenes
- Species: A. urubambensis

Binomial name
- Asthenes urubambensis (Chapman, 1919)

Subspecies
- See text

= Line-fronted canastero =

Species of bird

The line-fronted canastero (Asthenes urubambensis) is a Near Threatened species of bird in the Furnariinae subfamily of the ovenbird family Furnariidae. It is found in Bolivia and Peru.

== Taxonomy and systematics ==
The line-fronted canastero has two subspecies, the nominate A. u. urubambensis (Chapman, 1919) and A. u. huallagae (Zimmer 1924).

== Description ==
The line-fronted canastero is 17 to 18 cm (6.7 to 7.1 in) long and weighs 16 to 20 g (0.56 to 0.71 oz). It is a large canastero with a narrow spiny tail. The sexes have the same plumage. Adults of the nominate subspecies have a conspicuous whitish supercilium that widens past the eye on an otherwise light brownish face with narrow dark brown streaks. Their forehead ("front") is dark brown with well-defined golden-brown stripes that fade on the brown crown. Their hindneck and upperparts are rich brown, the former with blurry light brown streaks that fade on the upper back and pale streaks on the uppertail coverts. Their wings are rich brown with dark fuscous tips on the flight feathers. Their tail is rich brown. Their chin is pale tawny to dark rufous, their upper throat tawny to orange-rufous, and their lower throat light buff-brown with dark brown streaks. Their breast is a paler buff-brown than the throat with wide dark brown and pale buff streaks that fade onto the pale buff belly. Their flanks and undertail coverts are rich brown; the latter have pale streaks. Their iris is brown, their maxilla black to gray-horn, their mandible silver-gray to pinkish, and their legs and feet olive to gray. Subspecies A. u. huallagae has slightly darker and redder upperparts than the nominate, with streaks mostly on the forehead and hindneck. It also has more and whiter streaks on the belly and flanks.

== Distribution and habitat ==
The line-fronted canastero has a disjunct distribution. Subspecies A. u. huallagae is found in the Andes of central Peru between the departments of San Martín and Pasco. The nominate subspecies is found in the Andes from the departments of Cuzco and Puno in Peru south into western Bolivia as far as La Paz and Cochabamba departments. The species inhabits the ecotone between timberline and páramo grasslands, a landscape characterized by mossy scrub, Gynoxys and Ribes bushes, and groves of Polylepis trees. In elevation it ranges between 3,050 and 4,300 m (10,000 and 14,100 ft).

== Behavior ==
=== Movement ===
The line-fronted canastero is a year-round resident throughout its range.

=== Feeding ===
The line-fronted canastero feeds on arthropods. It forages singly or in pairs, gleaning prey from tree branches and shrubs, and less often the ground.

=== Breeding ===
Nothing is known about the line-fronted canastero's breeding biology.

=== Vocalization ===
The line-fronted canastero's song is "an ascending trill"; its call is "a high 'tseut' ".

== Status ==
The IUCN originally in 1988 assessed the line-fronted canastero as Threatened but since 2004 has rated it Near Threatened. It has a somewhat restricted range and an estimated population of between 2500 and 10,000 mature individuals that is believed to be decreasing. "Although some montane habitats in Peru are still relatively pristine, in Bolivia native habitats have been extensively degraded by livestock grazing, burning and firewood collection. Heavy grazing by livestock and the uncontrolled use of fire also combine to prevent Polylepis regeneration, especially where cutting for timber, firewood and charcoal occurs." It is considered generally rare to uncommon though locally common, with a patchy distribution. It does occur in at least one protected area in each of Bolivia and Peru.
