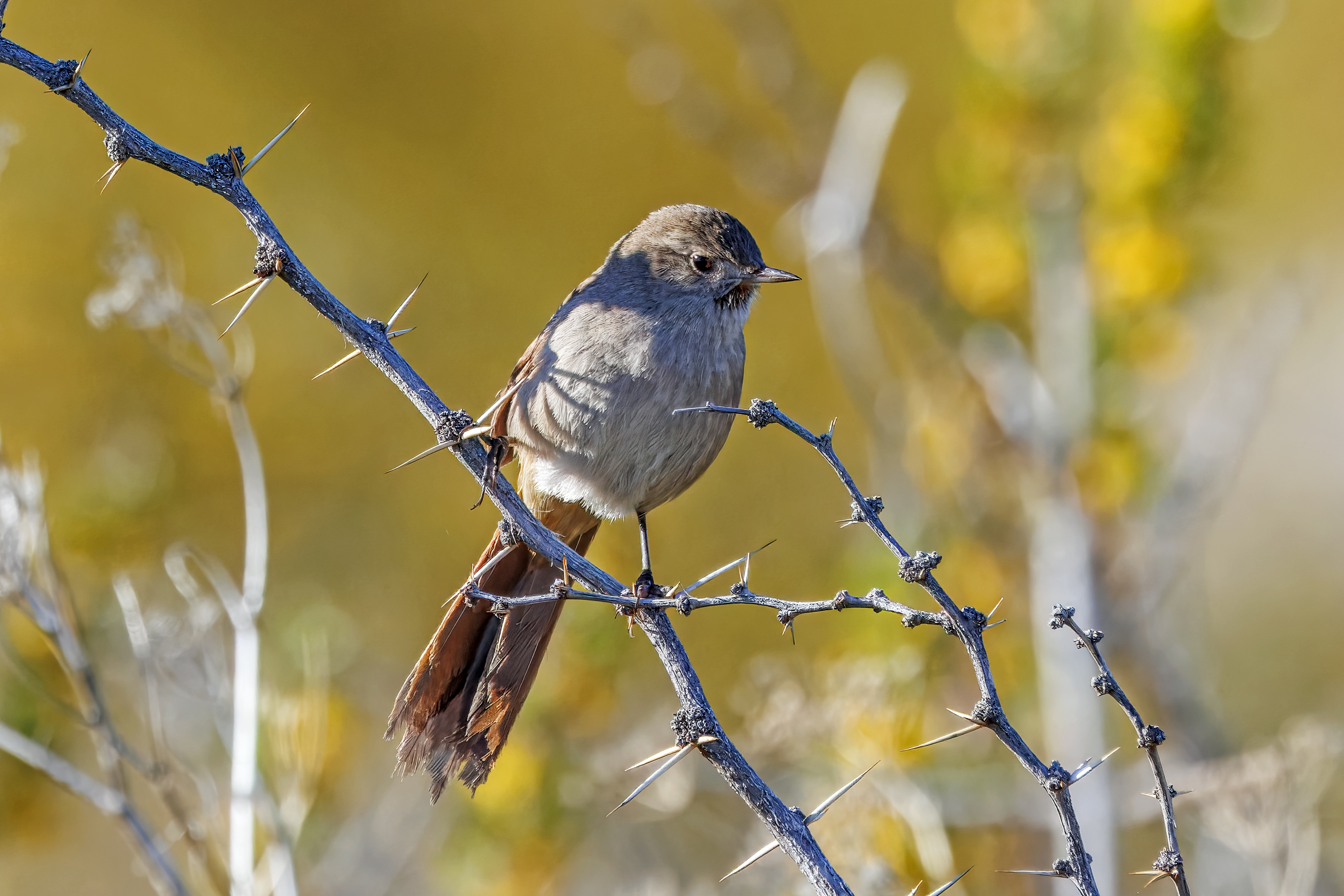
- El Calafate, Argentina.

Conservation status
- Least Concern (IUCN 3.1)

Scientific classification
- Kingdom: Animalia
- Phylum: Chordata
- Class: Aves
- Order: Passeriformes
- Family: Furnariidae
- Genus: Asthenes
- Species: A. pyrrholeuca

Binomial name
- Asthenes pyrrholeuca (Vieillot, 1817)

Subspecies
- See text

= Sharp-billed canastero =

Species of bird

The sharp-billed canastero or lesser canastero (Asthenes pyrrholeuca) is a species of bird in the Furnariinae subfamily of the ovenbird family Furnariidae. It is found in Argentina, Bolivia, Chile, Paraguay, and Uruguay, and has also occurred as a vagrant in Brazil.

== Taxonomy and systematics ==
The sharp-billed canastero's taxonomy is unsettled. The International Ornithological Committee (IOC) and BirdLife International's Handbook of the Birds of the World (HBW) assign it two subspecies, the nominate A. p. pyrrholeuca (Vieillot, 1817) and A. p. sordida (Lesson, 1839). The Clements taxonomy adds two more, A. p. affinis (Berlepsch, 1906) and A. p. flavogularis (Gould, 1839). The IOC and HBW consider affinis to be a seasonal morph of sordida and flavogularis to be a seasonal morph of the nominate pyrrholeuca.

This article follows the two-subspecies model.

== Description ==
The sharp-billed canastero is 14 to 15 cm (5.5 to 5.9 in) long and weighs 12 to 14 g (0.42 to 0.49 oz). It is one of the smaller canasteros, with a pointed bill that is thinner than those of most others. The sexes have the same plumage. Adults of the nominate subspecies have a gray-brown face with a paler supercilium. Their crown is dull brown, their back and rump a slightly paler brown, and their uppertail coverts long and browner. Their wings are mostly dull rufescent brown. Their central pair of tail feathers are pointed; they and the next two pairs are dark fuscous brown with dusky tips and the rest mostly dull rufous with dark inner webs. Their chin and upper throat are rufous to tawny with dark-tipped pale streaks. Their lower throat and breast are pale grayish brown with faint streaks on the latter, their belly pale buff-brown, and their flanks and undertail coverts darker buff-brown with a rufescent tinge. Their iris is brown, their maxilla slate-gray to black, their mandible gray-horn, and their legs and feet slate-gray. Juveniles do not have the throat patch and their breast is mottled. Subspecies A. p. sordida differs from the nominate only by having entirely rufous outer tail feathers.

== Distribution and habitat ==
The nominate subspecies of the sharp-billed canastero breeds in central and southern Argentina and winters to northern Argentina and southern Paraguay and Uruguay. Subspecies A. p. sordida breeds in central and southern Chile and west-central Argentina and winters to northern Argentina and southern Bolivia. The species inhabits a variety of semi-arid to arid landscapes including shrub-steppe, lowland and montane scrublands, and temperate, hilly, and rocky grasslands. In the non-breeding season it also occurs in tall grass, marshy areas, and Gran Chaco scrub. In elevation it mostly ranges from sea level to 2,000 m (6,600 ft) but locally occurs as high as 3,000 m (9,800 ft).

== Behavior ==
=== Movement ===
The sharp-billed canastero is a partial migrant. Some portion of the population moves from the south to beyond the northern limit of the species' breeding range for the austral winter.

=== Feeding ===
The sharp-billed canastero feeds on arthropods. It usually forages singly or in pairs, gleaning prey from foliage and only rarely on the ground.

=== Breeding ===
The sharp-billed canastero breeds in the austral spring and summer, roughly September to February. Some pairs are thought to raise two broods in a season. It is thought to be monogamous. It weaves a globular nest of small twigs up to about 30 cm (12 in) across, with an entrance on the side or near the top. It lines the interior with hair, feathers, and soft plant material. It usually places it in the crotch of branches of a bush up to 4 m (13 ft) above the ground. The clutch size is two to four eggs. The incubation period, time to fledging, and details of parental care are not known.

=== Vocalization ===
The sharp-billed canastero's song is "a 2-note trill, 'tsee-ee-ee-ee, tsee-ee-ee-ee' " and its contact call "a rising 'sweep' ".

== Status ==
The IUCN has assessed the sharp-billed canastero as being of Least Concern. It has a very large range and an unknown population size that is believed to be decreasing. No immediate threats have been identified. It is considered fairly common to abundant in most of its range. Its habitat is "subjected to at least moderate grazing pressure".
