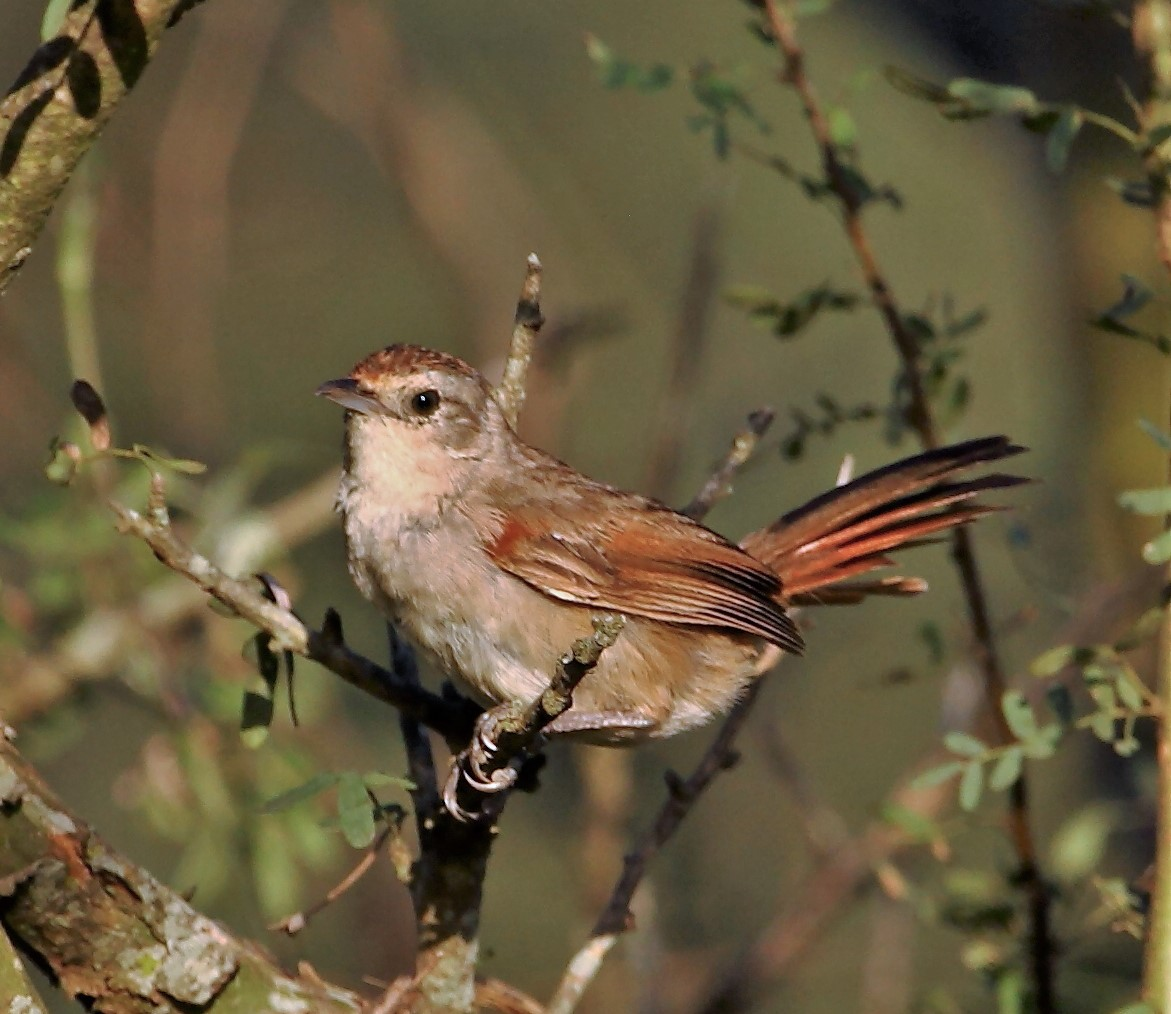
- At Santa Fe Province, Argentina

Conservation status
- Least Concern (IUCN 3.1)

Scientific classification
- Kingdom: Animalia
- Phylum: Chordata
- Class: Aves
- Order: Passeriformes
- Family: Furnariidae
- Genus: Phacellodomus
- Species: P. sibilatrix

Binomial name
- Phacellodomus sibilatrix Sclater, PL, 1879

= Little thornbird =

Species of bird

The little thornbird (Phacellodomus sibilatrix) is a species of bird in the Furnariinae subfamily of the ovenbird family Furnariidae. It is found in Argentina, Bolivia, Brazil, Paraguay, and Uruguay.

== Taxonomy and systematics ==
The formal description of the little thornbird is credited to Philip Sclater's 1879 publication. However, a specimen collected by Azara and described in 1817 by Vieillot as Sylvia ruficollis was later determined to be a little thornbird. Sclater's binomial was retained in the interest of long usage and continuity.

The little thornbird is monotypic.

== Description ==
The little thornbird is 13 to 14 cm (5.1 to 5.5 in) long and weighs about 14 to 16 g (0.49 to 0.56 oz). It is the smallest member of its genus. The sexes have the same plumage. Adults have a wide dull buff-whitish supercilium that extends beyond the eye and an indistinct dull brown stripe behind the eye on an otherwise light brownish face. Their forehead is light rufous with pale streaks, their crown and back dull brown, and their rump and uppertail coverts rufescent-tinged brown. Their wings are mostly shades of brown with darker brown primary coverts and some rufescence. Their tail's central pair of feathers are dull brown, the next pair mostly rufous with a brownish outer third, and the rest bright rufous. Their throat and belly are dingy whitish, their breast slightly darker, and their flanks and undertail coverts whitish with a tawny-brown tinge. Their iris is greenish gray to dark brown, their maxilla black to dark gray, their mandible light horn-gray to gray, and their legs and feet gray to pinkish gray. Juveniles have slightly darker upperparts and slightly grayer underparts than adults.

== Distribution and habitat ==
The little thornbird is found in extreme southern Bolivia's Santa Cruz Department, in western Paraguay, in southwestern Uruguay, and in northern Argentina as far south as Buenos Aires Province. In addition there is at least one record in extreme southwestern Rio Grande do Sul, Brazil. It inhabits tropical deciduous forest, Gran Chaco woodlands, savannah with scattered trees, and scrublands. In elevation it ranges from near sea level to 2,000 m (6,600 ft).

== Behavior ==
=== Movement ===
The little thornbird is a year-round resident throughout its range.

=== Feeding ===
The little thornbird feeds on arthropods. It usually forages in pairs or small groups that may include nest helpers, and occasionally joins mixed-species feeding flocks. It captures prey by gleaning from the ground or from vegetation as high as the forest's mid-storey.

=== Breeding ===
The little thornbird breeds in the austral spring and summer, roughly August to February or beyond. It builds a cone-shaped nest of thorny sticks that can be about 40 cm (1 ft) high and lines an interior chamber with shredded vegetation, hair, feathers, and other soft material. It hangs the nest near the end a bush or tree branch, usually in an isolated tree or small cluster of them. The clutch size is usually three and sometimes four eggs. The incubation period, time to fledging, and details of parental care are not known.

=== Vocalization ===
The little thornbird's song is "a duetted series of sharp, piercing, loud and straight tee tee tees, where one bird goes faster than the other (three notes for two) so the effect is a tee teeter tee teeter teeter tee tee teeter...". Its call is "a sharp 'chip', often repeated".

== Status ==
The IUCN has assessed the little thornbird as being of Least Concern. It has a large range, but its population size is not known and believed to be decreasing. No immediate threats have been identified. It is considered common to uncommon in most of its range and occurs in at least one protected area.
