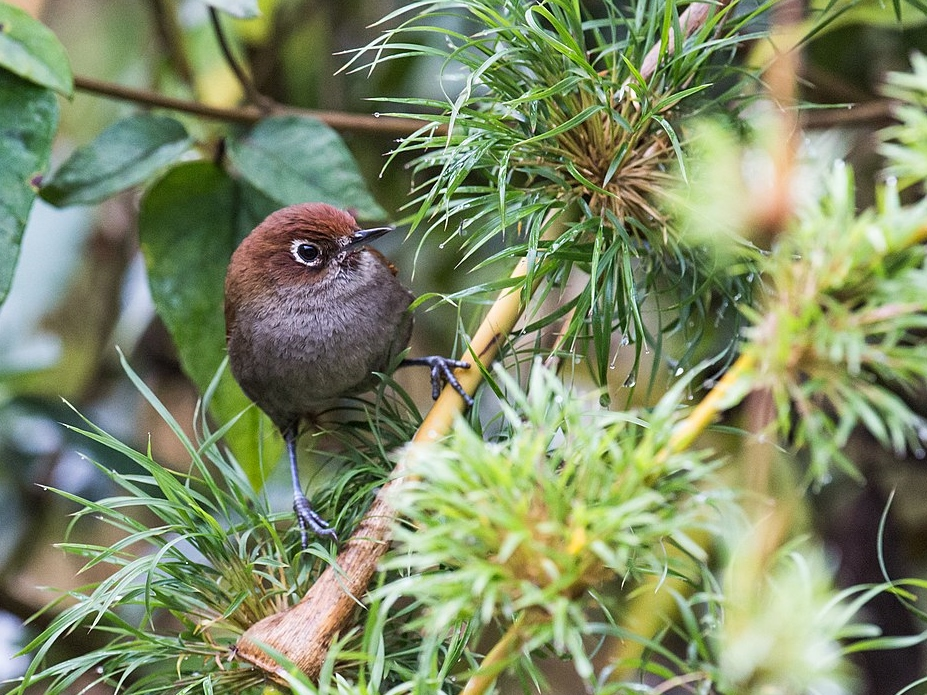

Conservation status
- Least Concern (IUCN 3.1)

Scientific classification
- Kingdom: Animalia
- Phylum: Chordata
- Class: Aves
- Order: Passeriformes
- Family: Furnariidae
- Genus: Asthenes
- Species: A. palpebralis

Binomial name
- Asthenes palpebralis (Cabanis, 1873)

Synonyms
- Schizoeaca palpebralis

= Eye-ringed thistletail =

Species of bird

The eye-ringed thistletail (Asthenes palpebralis) is a species of bird in the Furnariinae subfamily of the ovenbird family Furnariidae. It is endemic to central Peru.

== Taxonomy and systematics ==
The eye-ringed thistletail was long treated as a subspecies of the white-chinned thistletail (then Schizoeaca fuliginosa, now Asthenes fuliginosa) but was eventually separated as a species. They and several other species were in genus Schizoeaca but genetic data showed that the genus is embedded within Asthenes. The eye-ringed thistletail is monotypic.

== Description ==
The eye-ringed thistletail is 18 to 20 cm (7.1 to 7.9 in) long and weighs 16 to 18 g (0.56 to 0.63 oz). The sexes have the same plumage. Adults have a wide white eyering and dark brown lores on an otherwise chestnut-brown face. Their crown, back, rump, and wings are a darker chestnut-brown. Their tail is a more rufescent brown than the back; it is long and deeply forked with few barbs at the feather ends that give a ragged appearance. Their chin has a rusty or orange-rufous patch. Their throat and the rest of their underparts are gray with a paler belly and brownish-tinged flanks. Their iris is light gray to chestnut, their maxilla black, their mandible black or gray, and their legs and feet gray to blue-gray. Juveniles do not have the rusty chin; their belly is paler than adults' and their flanks brower.

== Distribution and habitat ==
The eye-ringed thistletail is found only in the Andes of Peru's Department of Junín. It inhabits the narrow ecotone of the upper edges of cloudforest and the elfin forest above it. Often the understory is dense with Chusquea bamboo. In elevation it is found between 3,030 and 3,710 m (9,900 and 12,200 ft).

== Behavior ==
=== Movement ===
The eye-ringed thistletail is believed to be a year-round resident throughout its range.

=== Feeding ===
The eye-ringed thistletail's diet and foraging behavior are not known in detail. It is assumed to feed mostly on arthropods gleaned in the understory from foliage, branches, and moss. It is usually seen singly or in pairs.

=== Breeding ===
Nothing is known about the eye-ringed thistletail's breeding biology.

=== Vocalization ===
The eye-ringed thistletail is quite vocal, with both members of a pair singing. Its song is "a long, slightly undulating or accelerating dry chatter or trill, which rises until near the end when it falls sharply". Its call is "a sharp, rising peee or weee".

== Status ==
The IUCN has assessed the eye-ringed thistletail as being of Least Concern. It has a small range and an unknown population size that is believed to be decreasing. No immediate threats have been identified. "Land-use practises such as burning, grazing, and the conversion/clearance of paramo grasslands and forest patches for small-scale agriculture has greatly reduced the total surface extent of the linear Andean tree-line ecotone [and the] effects of habitat loss on the tree-line bird community have not yet been studied quantitatively."
