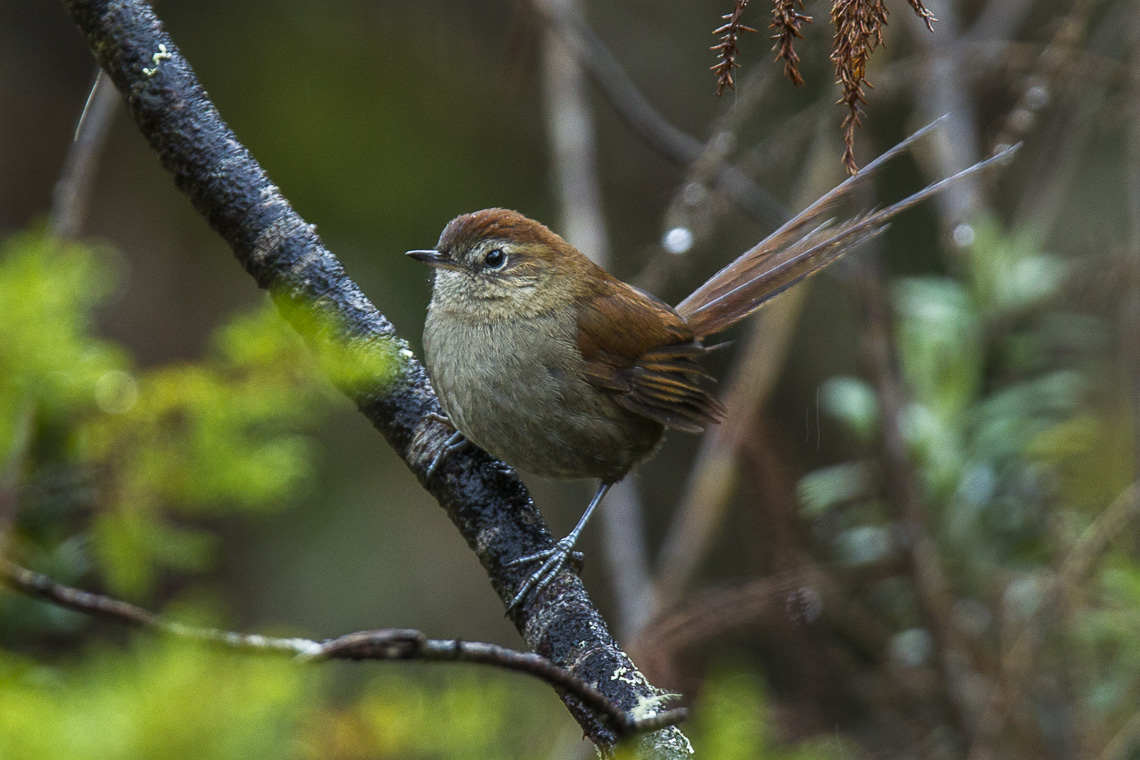

Conservation status
- Least Concern (IUCN 3.1)

Scientific classification
- Kingdom: Animalia
- Phylum: Chordata
- Class: Aves
- Order: Passeriformes
- Family: Furnariidae
- Genus: Asthenes
- Species: A. fuliginosa

Binomial name
- Asthenes fuliginosa (Lafresnaye, 1843)

Subspecies
- See text

Synonyms
- Schizoeaca fuliginosa

Audio
- Song recorded in Ecuador

= White-chinned thistletail =

Species of bird

The white-chinned thistletail, or colicardo barbiblanco in Ecuador, (Asthenes fuliginosa) is a species of bird in the Furnariinae subfamily of the ovenbird family Furnariidae. It is found in Colombia, Ecuador, Peru, and Venezuela.

== Taxonomy and systematics ==
The white-chinned thistletail has four subspecies:

- Asthenes fuliginosa fuliginosa (Lafresnaye, 1843)
- Asthenes fuliginosa fumigata (Borrero, 1960)
- Asthenes fuliginosa peruviana (Cory, 1916)
- Asthenes fuliginosa plengei (O'Neill & Parker, 1976)

What are now several other individual species of thistletail were previously also treated as subspecies of the white-chinned thistletail. All of them were in genus Schizoeaca but genetic data showed that the genus is embedded within Asthenes. In addition, the mouse-colored thistletail (A. griseomurina) possibly should be treated as a fifth subspecies of the white-chinned.

== Description ==
The white-chinned thistletail is 18 to 20 cm (7.1 to 7.9 in) long and weighs 14 to 20 g (0.49 to 0.71 oz). It is the largest thistletail. The sexes have the same plumage. Adults of the nominate subspecies A. f. fuliginosa have a faint grayish-tawny supercilium and a whitish eyering on an otherwise blackish to dark brown face. Their crown, back, rump, and tail are dark reddish brown. Their wings are a brighter reddish brown. Their tail is long and deeply forked with few barbs at the feather ends that give a ragged appearance. Their chin is whitish. Their throat and the rest of their underparts are grayish with a brownish tinge on the flanks. Their iris color is highly variable, their maxilla black to dark gray, their mandible dark with a pinkish to whitish base, and their legs and feet blue-gray to gray.

The other subspecies of the white-chinned thistletail differ mostly in the color of their upperparts. Subspecies A. f. fumigata has a darker back than the nominate and browner underparts. A. f. peruviana has duller upperparts than the nominate, with a darker chin, little or no eyering, and a gray or blue-gray mandible. A. f. plengei has redder upperparts and tail than the nominate, with a longer and whiter supercilium and a dark gray lower throat with whitish streaks.

== Distribution and habitat ==
The subspecies of the white-chinned thistletail are found thus:

- A. f. fuliginosa: Venezuela's Táchira state, Colombia's Eastern Andes, and the Andes of Ecuador as far south as Pichincha Province on the western slope and Morona-Santiago Province on the eastern slope
- A. f. fumigata: Colombia's Central Andes between the departments of Caldas and Nariño
- A. f. peruviana: Andes of northern Peru's Amazonas Department
- A. f. plengei: Andes of central Peru between the departments of San Martín and Pasco

The white-chinned thistletail inhabits páramo grasslands and elfin forest, the upper edge of cloudforest, and dense undergrowth at tree line. Locally it also occurs in Polylepis woodland. In elevation it generally ranges between 2,800 and 4,000 m (9,200 and 13,100 ft). In Ecuador it occurs below 3,500 m (11,500 ft); in Colombia it occurs as low as 2,400 m (7,900 ft).

== Behavior ==
=== Movement ===
The white-chinned thistletail is a year-round resident throughout its range.

=== Feeding ===
The white-chinned thistletail feeds mostly on arthropods but also includes small seeds in its diet. It usually forages singly on in pairs and only rarely joins mixed-species feeding flocks. It feeds in the understory, gleaning prey from foliage and small branches, and sometimes makes acrobatic moves.

=== Vocalization ===
One of the white-chinned thistletail's songs is "a high-pitched, weak, slightly accelerating and ascending trill". Others are a "descending series of somewhat higher-pitched notes that accelerates into trill, and a slightly ascending series of tripled notes, 'tididit, tididit, tididit' ". Its calls include "a high-pitched, sharp, penetrating 'pyeek' or 'kick' " and "chink".

== Status ==
The IUCN has assessed the white-chinned thistletail as being of Least Concern. It has a large range and an unknown population size; the latter is believed to be stable. No immediate threats have been identified. It is considered "generally fairly common in appropriate habitat" but "timber-line habitats have been greatly altered and reduced by fire and grazing throughout most of the Andes".
