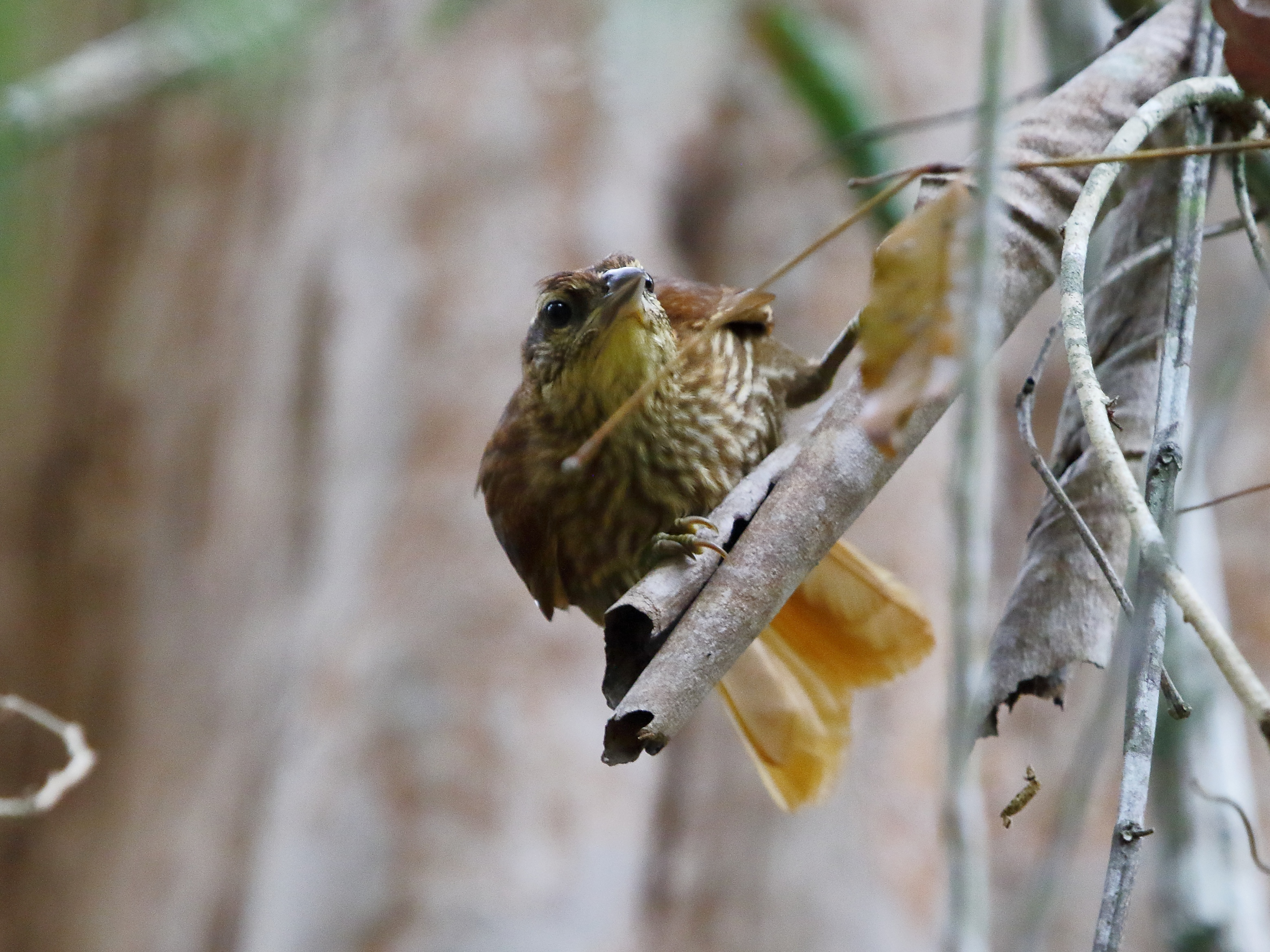
- Thripophaga macroura

Scientific classification
- Kingdom: Animalia
- Phylum: Chordata
- Class: Aves
- Order: Passeriformes
- Family: Furnariidae
- Genus: Thripophaga; Cabanis, 1847

Type species
- Anabates macrourus zu Wied-Neuwied, 1821

Species
- See text

= Thripophaga =

Genus of birds

Thripophaga is a genus of birds that popularly are known as softtails. They are members of the ovenbird family, Furnariidae. They are found in wooded and shrubby habitats, sometimes near water, in South America.

== Taxonomy and systematics ==
Softtails are closely related to Cranioleuca spinetails and the generic limits between these two genera were not clear in the past. For example, the Russet-mantled Softtail, despite its English name, is a true Cranioleuca spinetail, and the speckled spinetail turned out to be part of Thripophaga. Previous speculations suggesting a close relationship between Thripophaga and Phacellodomus were disproved.

=== Extant species ===
The genus contains five species:

- Speckled spinetail (Thripophaga gutturata)
- Orinoco softtail (Thripophaga cherriei)
- Delta Amacuro softtail (Thripophaga amacurensis)
- Striated softtail (Thripophaga macroura)
- Plain softtail (Thripophaga fusciceps)
