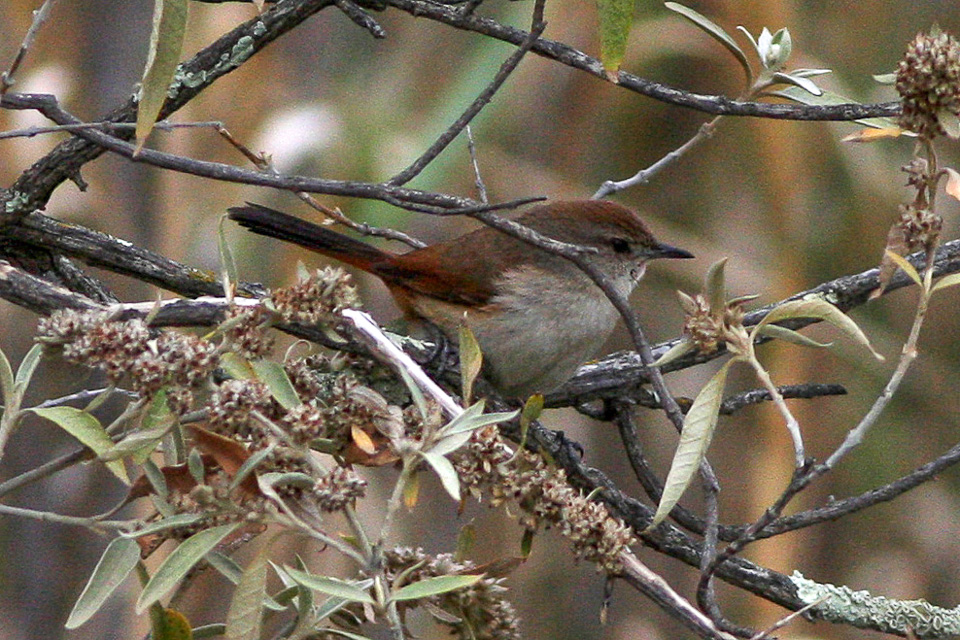

Conservation status
- Least Concern (IUCN 3.1)

Scientific classification
- Kingdom: Animalia
- Phylum: Chordata
- Class: Aves
- Order: Passeriformes
- Family: Furnariidae
- Genus: Asthenes
- Species: A. dorbignyi

Binomial name
- Asthenes dorbignyi (Reichenbach, 1853)

Subspecies
- See text

Synonyms
- Bathmidura dorbignyi (Reichenbach)

= Rusty-vented canastero =

Species of bird

The rusty-vented canastero or creamy-breasted canastero (Asthenes dorbignyi) is a species of bird in the Furnariinae subfamily of the ovenbird family Furnariidae. It is found in Argentina and Bolivia.

== Taxonomy and systematics ==
The rusty-vented canastero's taxonomy is unsettled. The International Ornithological Committee (IOC) and BirdLife International's Handbook of the Birds of the World (HBW) assign it two subspecies, the nominate A. d. dorbignyi (Reichenbach, 1853) and A. d. consobrina (Hellmayr, 1925). The South American Classification Committee of the American Ornithological Society and the Clements taxonomy include three more, A. d. arequipae (Sclater & Salvin, 1869), A. d. usheri (Morrison, A.R.G., 1947), and A. d. huancavelicae (Morrison, A.R.G., 1938). The IOC and HBW treat arequipae as a separate species, calling it the "dark-winged" and "Arequipa" canasteros respectively. The IOC treats huancavelicae as the pale-tailed canastero with usheri as a subspecies of it. HBW separately treats huancavelicae as the "Huancavelicae canastero" and usheri as the "white-tailed canastero".

To further complicate matters, all five of these taxa have plumage, morphological, vocal, behavioral, and nest structure characteristics that may better place them in the thornbird genus Phacellodomus rather than Asthenes.

This article follows the two-subspecies model.

== Description ==
The rusty-vented canastero is 14.5 to 16.5 cm (5.7 to 6.5 in) long and weighs 17.5 to 24 g (0.62 to 0.85 oz). It is a medium-sized canastero. The sexes have the same plumage. Adults of the nominate subspecies have a light gray supercilium and an indistinct brownish line behind the eye in an otherwise dull buff face. Their crown, nape, and back are pale brown and their rump and uppertail coverts rufous brown. Their wing coverts are rufous chestnut and their flight feathers dusky with wide rufous chestnut edges on the inner ones. Their tail's outermost pair of feathers are rufous and the rest blackish. The center of their throat is orange rufous. The sides of their throat, breast, and belly are creamy white, their flanks tawny rufous, and their undertail coverts rufous. Their iris is dark brown to light gray, their maxilla black or dark gray, their mandible blackish (often with a pinkish base), and their legs and feet blue-gray to black. Juveniles have an entirely white throat and faint dusky bars or mottling on the breast and belly. Subspecies A. d. consobrina is very like the nominate, but its primaries are entirely dark and contrast with the chestnut of the secondaries.

== Distribution and habitat ==
The nominate subspecies of the rusty-vented canastero is found in the Andes from Cochabamba Department in central Bolivia south into northwestern Argentina as far as Mendoza Province. Subspecies A. d. consobrina is found in the Andes of southwestern Bolivia's La Paz, Oruro, and Potosí departments. The species inhabits arid landscapes, especially scrublands and nearby woodlands.

== Behavior ==
=== Movement ===
The rusty-vented canastero is a year-round resident throughout its range.

=== Feeding ===
The rusty-vented canastero's diet has not been detailed but is known to be mostly arthropods and include seeds. It forages on the ground and in low woody vegetation, usually singly or in pairs, and gleaning for its prey.

=== Breeding ===
The nest of the nominate subspecies of the rusty-vented canastero is a globular mass of sticks, some of which are thorny, with an entrance near the top and a tunnel to the nest chamber. The chamber is lined with wool, feathers, and soft plant material. The nest is built in a shrub, a small tree, or on a columnar cactus, and several nests may be in one tree. Both sexes build the nest. The nest of subspecies A. d. consobrina has not been described. The species is thought to be monogamous. Small family groups roost in nests year-round. Nothing else is known about its breeding biology.

=== Vocalization ===
The rusty-vented canastero's song "may begin with a series of introductory notes, but these apparently are not always given. The song then...accelerates and ascends, before descending and decelerating near the end". Its call has been described as a "wheezy, earthcreeper-like whee" and as a "rising, penetrating shreep! or whee". It usually sings from atop a bush or small tree.

== Status ==
The IUCN has assessed the rusty-vented canastero as being of Least Concern. It has a large range but an unknown population size that is believed to be decreasing. No immediate threats have been identified. It is considered common in much of its range but possibly local in Argentina. "The primary effect of human activity on the [rusty vented canastero] is to reduce habitat area or quality, through clearing of habitat."
