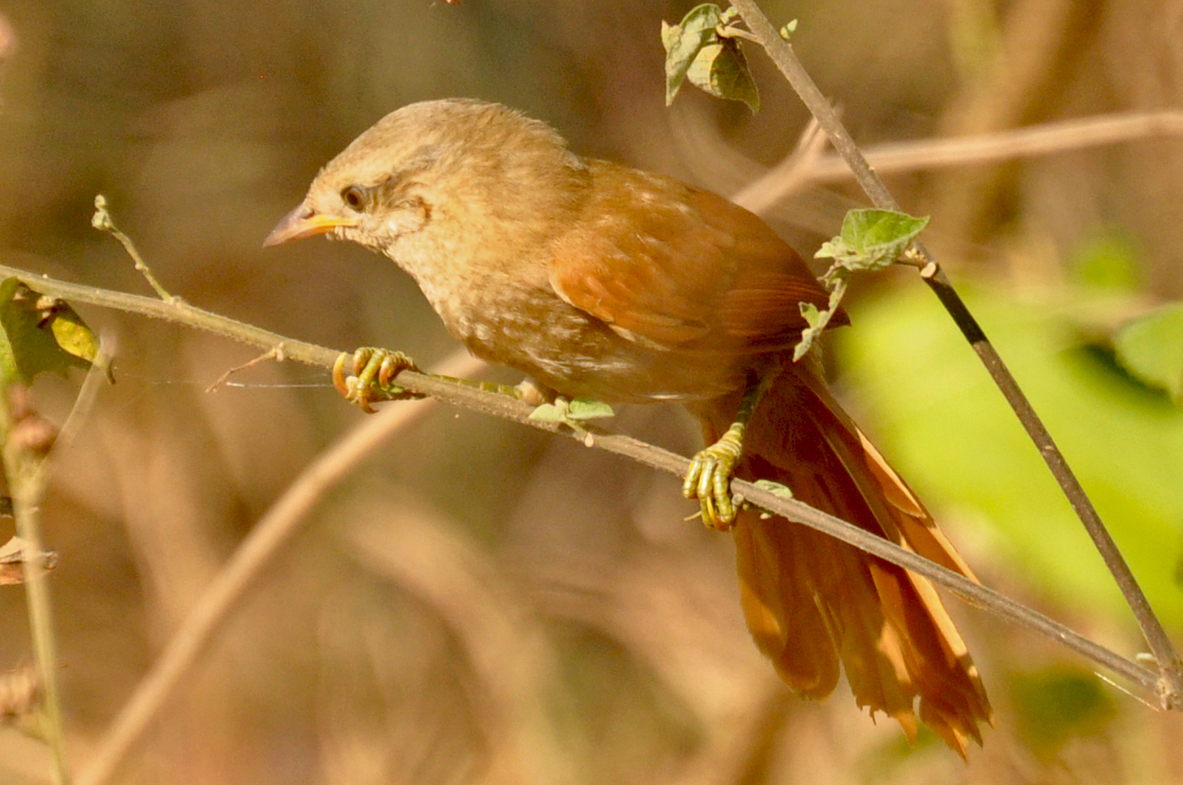
- T. fusciceps in Mamoré, El Beni, Bolivia

Conservation status
- Least Concern (IUCN 3.1)

Scientific classification
- Kingdom: Animalia
- Phylum: Chordata
- Class: Aves
- Order: Passeriformes
- Family: Furnariidae
- Genus: Thripophaga
- Species: T. fusciceps

Binomial name
- Thripophaga fusciceps Sclater, PL, 1889

Synonyms
- Phacellodomus fusciceps

= Plain softtail =

Species of bird

The plain softtail (Thripophaga fusciceps) is a species of bird in the Furnariinae subfamily of the ovenbird family Furnariidae. It is found in Bolivia, Brazil, Ecuador, and Peru.

== Taxonomy and systematics ==
The plain softtail was at times placed by some authors in genus Phacellodomus. The species has three subspecies, the nominate T. f. fusciceps (Sclater, PL, 1889), T. f. dimorpha (Bond, J & Meyer de Schauensee, 1941), and T. f. obidensis (Todd, 1925). Because the subspecies are different sizes and are geographically much separated, some authors speculate that they should be treated as full species.

== Description ==
The plain softtail is 16 to 18 cm (6.3 to 7.1 in) long and weighs 23 to 24 g (0.81 to 0.85 oz). The sexes have almost the same plumage. Adult males of the nominate subspecies have a faint pale supercilium and a thin dark line through the eye on a otherwise pale brownish gray face. Their crown is pale gray-brown with faint buff marks. Their upper back is pale gray-brown that becomes rufescent brown on the lower back, rump, and uppertail coverts. Their tail is rufous. Their wings are mostly dark rufous with dark brown tips on the flight feathers. Their chin is pale buff-brown and their throat, breast, and belly light brown with some faint paler streaks, and their flanks and undertail coverts are a slightly darker brown. (Some individuals have grayer underparts.) Their iris is highly variable, their maxilla bluish horn to pale gray, their mandible pale gray to pale bluish, and their legs and feet olive-green to yellowish olive. Females have paler foreheads and underparts than males. Juveniles are faintly mottled, rather than streaked, on their throat and breast.

Subspecies T. f. dimorpha is significantly smaller than the nominate and rather variable in color. In general it is overall much darker than the nominate, with little or no supercilium, a strongly rufescent back, and underparts that can be more rufescent, browner, or grayer than the nominate's. T. f. obidensis is even darker brown overall than dimorpha and has solely brown underparts.

== Distribution and habitat ==
The nominate subspecies of the plain softtail is found in northern Bolivia in the departments of Beni, La Paz, and Cochabamba. Subspecies T. f. dimorpha is found in separately in eastern Ecuador, northeastern Peru, and southeastern Peru. T. f. obidensis is found in central Brazil along the lower Madeira River and central Amazon River in the states of Amazonas and Pará.

The plain softtail inhabits tropical evergreen and river-edge forest, primarily várzea and the transition zone between it and dryer landscapes. It does occur in drier deciduous forest. It tends to favor forest edges and areas with dense vine tangles. In elevation it ranges between 50 and 500 m (160 and 1,600 ft).

== Behavior ==
=== Movement ===
The plain softtail is a year-round resident throughout its range.

=== Feeding ===
The plain softtail feeds on arthropods. It usually forages in pairs or small groups, often as part of a mixed-species feeding flock. It forages at all levels from the forest's understorey to its subcanopy. It gleans its prey from dead leaves, debris, and small branches while acrobatically moving along branches and especially amid vines.

=== Breeding ===
The plain softtail's nest is a globe of twigs and soft plant material with two entrance tubes low on the side, placed in a branch fork in the canopy. Nothing else is known about the species' breeding biology.

=== Vocalization ===
The song of the plain softtail's nominate subspecies "begins with widely spaced, dry ticking notes, accelerating and rising to extremely high notes, then descends into bursts of sputtering tick notes". That of T. f. dimorpha is "a sharp, loud, and descending churring". That of T. f. obidensis is a "very rhythmic chattering with rattles in tune". All three subspecies typically sing in duet.

== Status ==
The IUCN has assessed the plain softtail as being of Least Concern. It has a large though disjunct range and an unknown population size; the latter is believed to be stable. No immediate threats have been identified. It is considered rare and local.
