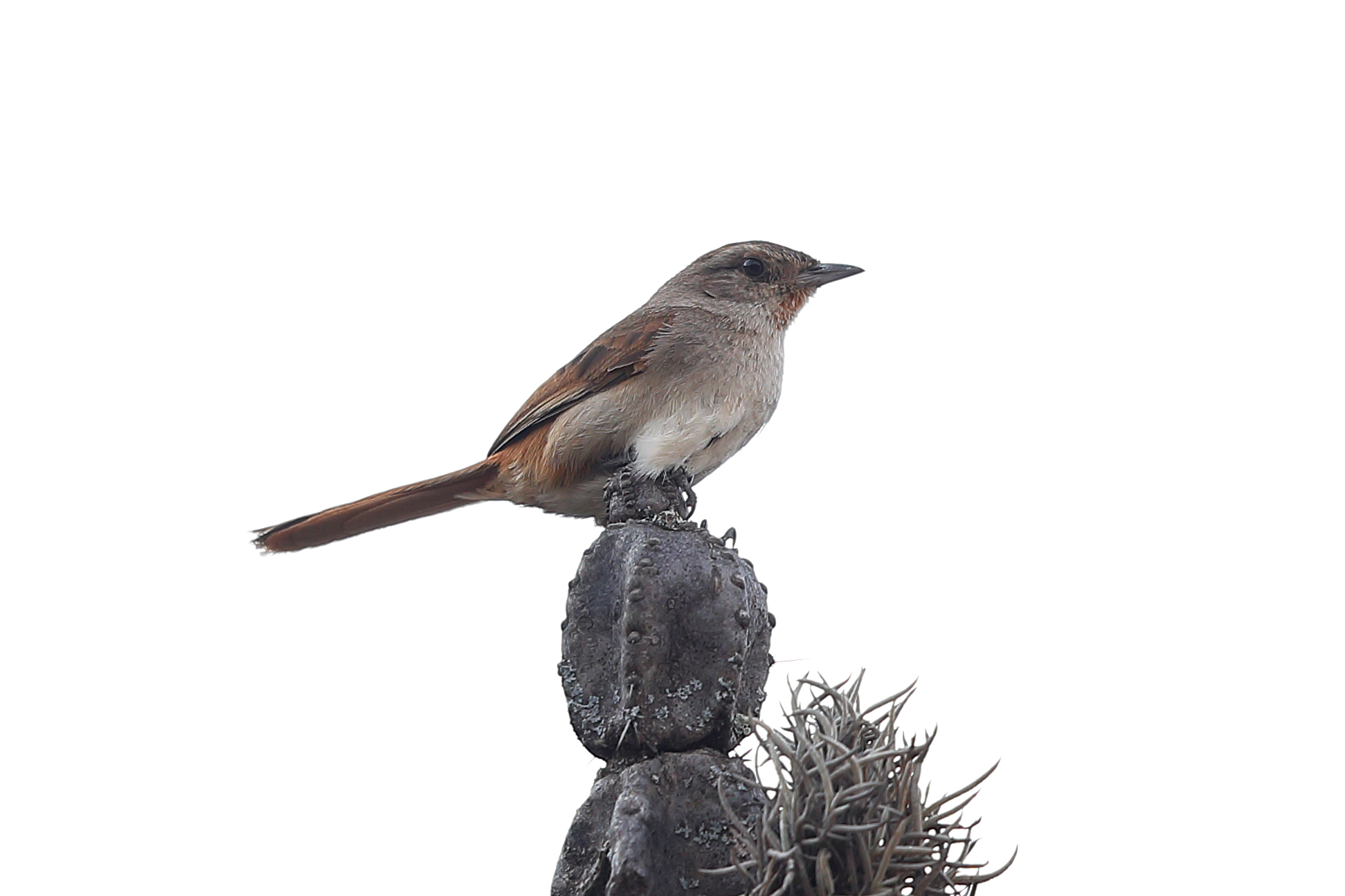

Conservation status
- Least Concern (IUCN 3.1)

- Near Threatened (IUCN 3.1)(see Taxonomy and Status sections)

Scientific classification
- Kingdom: Animalia
- Phylum: Chordata
- Class: Aves
- Order: Passeriformes
- Family: Furnariidae
- Genus: Asthenes
- Species: A. huancavelicae

Binomial name
- Asthenes huancavelicae Morrison, 1938
- Range of A. h. huancavelicae (see the Taxonomy and Distribution sections)

= Pale-tailed canastero =

Species of bird

The pale-tailed canastero (Asthenes huancavelicae), is a species of bird in the Furnariinae subfamily of the ovenbird family Furnariidae. It is endemic to Peru.

== Taxonomy and systematics ==
The pale-tailed canastero's taxonomy is unsettled. The International Ornithological Committee (IOC) assigns it two subspecies, the nominate A. h. huancavelicae (Morrison, ARG, 1938) and A. h. usheri (Morrison, ARG, 1947). BirdLife International's Handbook of the Birds of the World (HBW) treats the two taxa as full species, calling huancavelicae the "Huancavelicae canastero" and usheri the "white-tailed canastero". The South American Classification Committee of the American Ornithological Society and the Clements taxonomy treat both taxa as subspecies of the rusty-vented canastero (A. dorbignyi), which they call the "creamy-breasted canastero". To further complicate matters, these taxa have plumage, morphological, vocal, behavioral, and nest structure characteristics that may better place them in the thornbird genus Phacellodomus rather than Asthenes.

This article follows the two-subspecies model.

== Description ==
The pale-tailed canastero is 14.5 to 16.5 cm (5.7 to 6.5 in) long and weighs 17.5 to 24 g (0.62 to 0.85 oz). It is a medium-sized canastero. The sexes have the same plumage. Adults of the nominate subspecies have a light gray supercilium and an indistinct brownish line behind the eye in an otherwise dull buff face. Their crown, nape, and back are pale brown and their rump and uppertail coverts rufous brown. Their wing coverts are rufous chestnut and their flight feathers dusky with narrow rufous chestnut edges on the inner ones. Their tail's outermost pair of feathers are rufous with paler rufous to whitish buff outer webs and the rest blackish. The center of their throat is pale orange rufous. The sides of their throat, breast, and belly are creamy white, their flanks tawny rufous, and their undertail coverts rufous. Their iris is dark brown to light gray, their maxilla black or dark gray, their mandible blackish (often with a pinkish base), and their legs and feet blue-gray to black. Juveniles have an entirely white throat and faint dusky bars or mottling on the breast and belly. Subspecies A. h. usheri is overall paler than the nominate, with lighter brown upperparts, no rufous on the rump and uppertail coverts, and very pale whitish buff outer webs on the outermost tail feathers.

== Distribution and habitat ==
The pale-tailed canastero has a disjunct distribution. The nominate subspecies is found in the basin of the Mantaro River in Peru's departments of Huancavelica and Ayacucho. Subspecies A. h. usheri is found in the basins of the Apurímac River and its tributary Pampas River in Ayacucho and Apurímac departments. The species inhabits arid landscapes, especially scrublands with columnar cacti and also nearby woodlands.

== Behavior ==
=== Movement ===
The pale-tailed canastero is a year-round resident throughout its range.

=== Feeding ===
The pale-tailed canastero's diet has not been detailed but is known to be mostly arthropods and include seeds. It forages on the ground and in low woody vegetation, usually singly or in pairs, and gleaning for its prey.

=== Breeding ===
The nest of the nominate subspecies of the pale-tailed canastero has not been described. That of A. h. usheri is a globular mass of sticks about 40 cm (16 in) long, some of which are thorny, with an entrance near the top and a tunnel to the nest chamber. The chamber is lined with wool, feathers, and soft plant material. The nest is usually built in a columnar cactus. Both sexes build the nest. The species is thought to be monogamous. Small family groups roost in nests year-round. Nothing else is known about its breeding biology.

=== Vocalization ===
The song of the pale-tailed canastero's subspecies A. h. usheri is "a thin even-paced trill that rises and falls". It usually sings from atop a bush or small tree. The song of the nominate subspecies has not been described.

== Status ==
The IUCN follows HBW taxonomy and so has separately evaluated the "Huancavelica" and "white-tailed" canasteros. The "Huancavelica" canastero (A. h. huancavelicae) is assessed as being of Least Concern, though it has a limited range and an estimated population between 2500 and 10,000 mature individuals that is believed to be decreasing. The "white-tailed" canastero (A. h. usheri) is assessed as Near Threatened. It too has a limited range and an estimated population between 2500 and 10,000 mature individuals that is believed to be decreasing. For both, "habitat is thought to be declining as a result of burning and grazing and there may be indirect habitat damage caused by a change in humidity resulting from deforestation of adjacent areas. Nevertheless, habitat loss is suspected to be slow." The nominate subspecies is considered common but A. h. usheri is considered rare and local.
