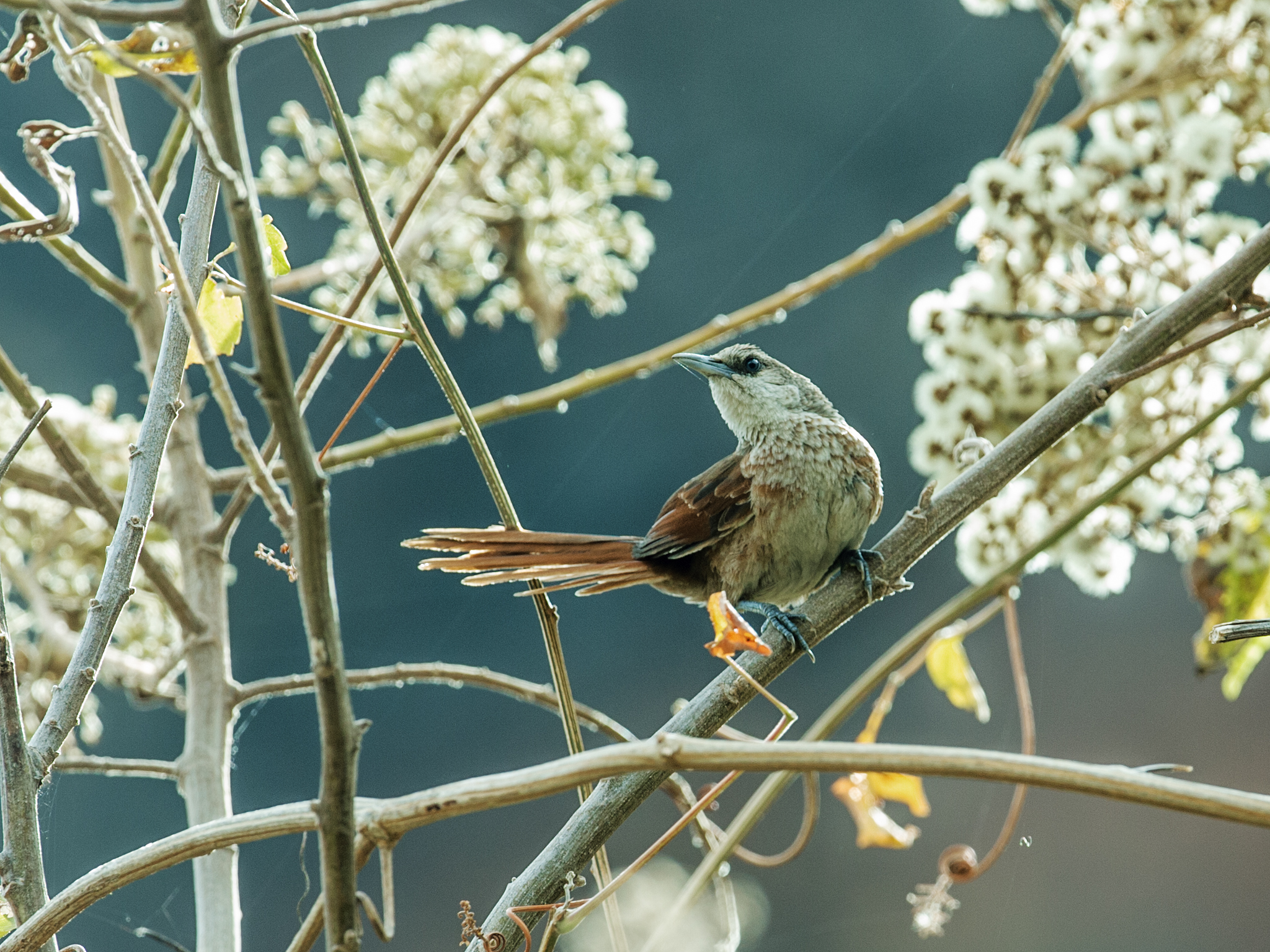

Conservation status
- Near Threatened (IUCN 3.1)

Scientific classification
- Kingdom: Animalia
- Phylum: Chordata
- Class: Aves
- Order: Passeriformes
- Family: Furnariidae
- Genus: Phacellodomus
- Species: P. dorsalis

Binomial name
- Phacellodomus dorsalis Salvin, 1895

= Chestnut-backed thornbird =

Species of bird

The chestnut-backed thornbird (Phacellodomus dorsalis) is a Near Threatened species of bird in the family Furnariidae. It is endemic to Peru.

== Taxonomy and systematics ==
The chestnut-backed thornbird is monotypic. It and the spot-breasted thornbird (P. maculipectus) are sister species.

== Description ==
The chestnut-backed thornbird is 19 to 21 cm (7.5 to 8.3 in) long and weighs about 33 to 39 g (1.2 to 1.4 oz). It is the longest member of its genus and has the longest bill. The sexes have the same plumage. Adults have a light gray-brown supercilium that extends beyond the eye and spreads, a thin dark brownish "mask", and dull tawny brownish ear coverts. Their crown is dark gray-brown with dull rufous streaks, their upper back grayish brown blending to their chestnut lower back, their rump grayish brown, and their uppertail coverts reddish brown-tinged grayish brown. Their wings are mostly shades of brown with some rufescence and chestnut flight feathers that have fuscous tips. Their tail's central pair of feathers are dull chestnut with browner inner webs and the rest rufous-chestnut with dull brown tips. Their throat and malar area are white, their upper breast tawny brownish with rufous sides and whitish spots that form an irregular band, their lower breast and belly mottled whitish and brownish, and their undertail coverts rufescent brownish with vague mottling. Their iris is gray, their maxilla dark olive-horn to dark horn, their mandible silver-gray to olive-gray, and their legs and feet gray to blue-gray.

== Distribution and habitat ==
The chestnut-backed thornbird is endemic to Peru. It is known only from a few locations in the upper valley of the Marañón River, in the departments of Cajamarca, La Libertad, and possibly Ancash. It inhabits arid montane scrublands, typically those with short Prosopis or Acacia macracantha trees. In elevation it mostly ranges between 1,800 and 3,100 m (5,900 and 10,200 ft) but occasionally occurs as high as 3,400 m (11,200 ft).

== Behavior ==
=== Movement ===
The chestnut-backed thornbird is a year-round resident throughout its range.

=== Feeding ===
The chestnut-backed thornbird's diet has not been studied but appears to be arthropods. It usually forages singly or in pairs, gleaning prey from branches and foliage up to about 4 m (13 ft) above the ground.

=== Breeding ===
The chestnut-backed thornbird's breeding season is not known. It is thought to be monogamous. It builds a large cylindrical nest of sticks near the tip of a tree branch. Nothing else is known about its breeding biology.

=== Vocalization ===
The chestnut-backed thornbird's song is a "series of ticking 'chit-chit-chit-chit-chit' notes given for long periods and varying in intensity, either alone or accelerating and breaking into a loud, even loudsong 'chup-chup-chupchupchupchuppppp' accelerating at the end".

== Status ==
The IUCN originally in 1988 assessed the chestnut-backed thornbird as Near Threatened, then in 2000 as Vulnerable, and since 2020 again as Near Threatened. It has a very small and fragemented range and its estimated population of between 6000 and 15,000 mature individuals is believed to be decreasing. "Habitat in the Marañón drainage has deteriorated progressively under a prolonged period of cultivation...Fire and clearance of land for agriculture are the principal threats." "The species apparently tolerates some degree of habitat alteration, but whether it can complete its life-cycle or occur at existing densities in heavily cultivated areas is not known." It is considered uncommon and does not occur in any protected areas, so "creation of a reserve is thus a high priority".
