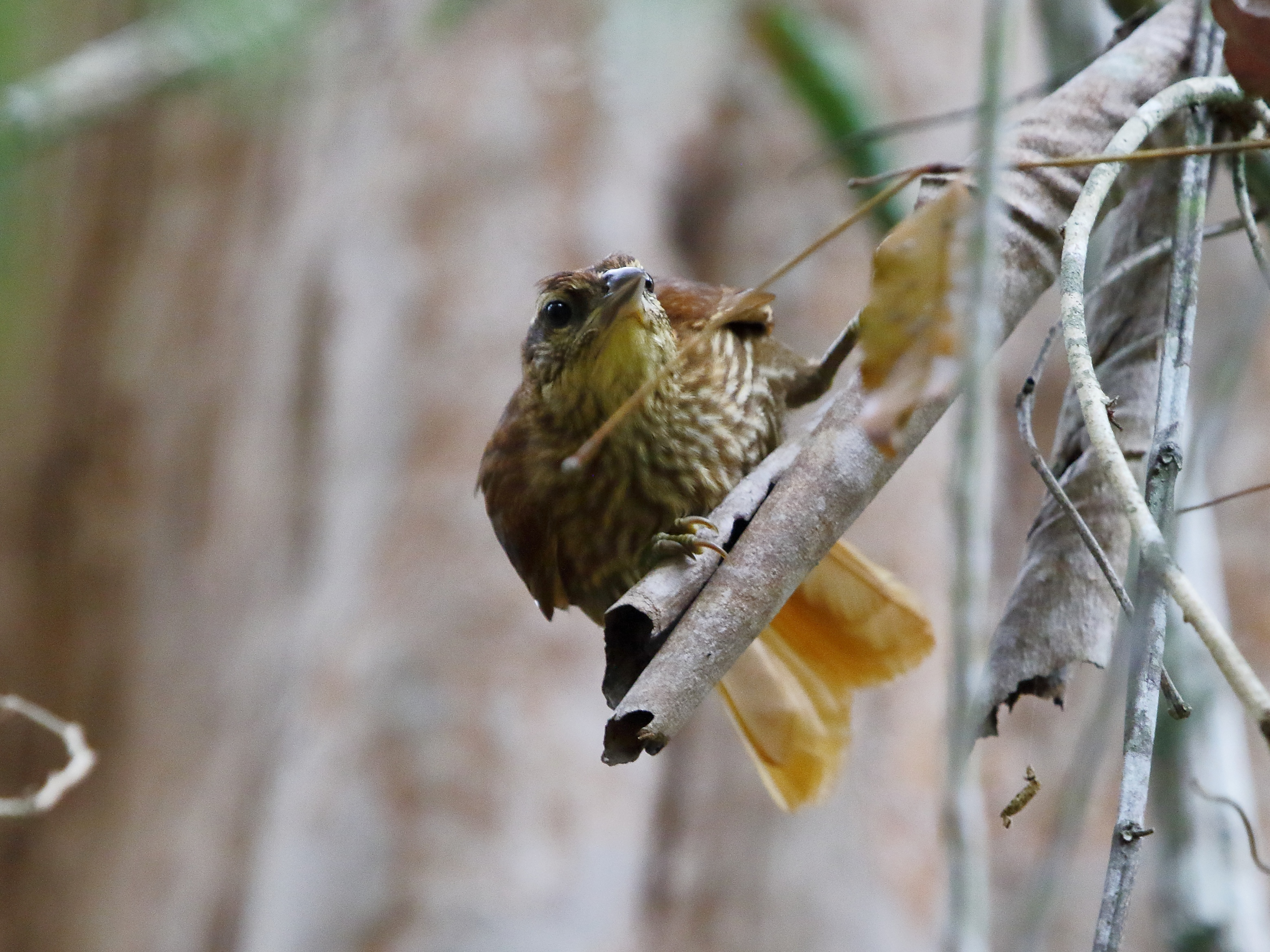

Conservation status
- Vulnerable (IUCN 3.1)

Scientific classification
- Kingdom: Animalia
- Phylum: Chordata
- Class: Aves
- Order: Passeriformes
- Family: Furnariidae
- Genus: Thripophaga
- Species: T. macroura

Binomial name
- Thripophaga macroura (Wied, 1821)

= Striated softtail =

Species of bird

The striated softtail (Thripophaga macroura) is a Vulnerable species of bird in the Furnariinae subfamily of the ovenbird family Furnariidae. It is endemic to eastern Brazil.

== Taxonomy and systematics ==
The striated softtail is monotypic.

== Description ==
The striated softtail is 17 to 18 cm (6.7 to 7.1 in) long. The sexes have the same plumage. Adults have a buff supercilium and pale lores on a otherwise buff-streaked brown face. Their crown, back, rump, and uppertail coverts are dark reddish brown streaked with black-edged reddish-rufous to rufous-buff. Their tail is pale tawny to cinnamon-rufous. Their wings are mostly dark rufous with dusky tips on the flight feathers. Their chin and upper throat are orange-rufous to yellowish orange. The rest of their underparts are dull brown with buff streaks that fade on the belly and undertail coverts. Their iris is deep chestnut brown, their maxilla dusky horn to silvery gray, their mandible bluish gray with a dusky horn tip, and their legs and feet dull greenish gray. Juveniles have a dull brown chin and throat, less well-defined streaks on the back than adults, and mottled rather than streaked underparts.

== Distribution and habitat ==
The striated softtail is found in coastal southeastern Brazil from southern Bahia state south into northern Rio de Janeiro state. It inhabits tropical lowland evergreen forest, especially areas with dense vine tangles. In elevation it ranges from near sea level to 1,000 m (3,300 ft).

== Behavior ==
=== Movement ===
The striated softtail is a year-round resident throughout its range.

=== Feeding ===
The striated softtail feeds on arthropods. It forages singly, in pairs, and in small groups that might be families, and usually as part of a mixed-species feeding flock. It forages from the forest's understorey to the subcanopy, gleaning its prey mostly in vine tangles but also along branches and in foliage.

=== Breeding ===
The striated softtail's breeding season has not been defined but active nests have been found between September and January. The nest is a ball of grass, moss, twigs, and rootlets with a vertical entrance tube at the bottom. It is typically placed (or woven onto) a branch fork about 10 to 25 m (33 to 82 ft) above the ground. The clutch size is three eggs. The incubation period, time to fledging, and details of parental care are not known.

=== Vocalization ===
The striated softtail's song is an "unstructured mixture of short rattles, 'tjew-tjew-tjew' notes, and sparrowlike chatters" that is often sung in duet. Its call is a loud "kit-kit-kit".

== Status ==
The IUCN originally assessed the striated softtail as Threatened, then in 1994 as Vulnerable, in 2000 as Endangered, and since 2004 again as Vulnerable. It has a small range and an estimated population of 1500 to 7000 mature individuals that is believed to be decreasing. "Widespread and continuing habitat destruction has severely fragmented this species's range. Although it has been observed in degraded forest, it may be dependent on the presence of dense vine-tangles, which are likely to occur only in little-disturbed and mature secondary forests." It occurs in several protected areas but its distribution is patchy. Brazilian authorities consider it Vulnerable.
