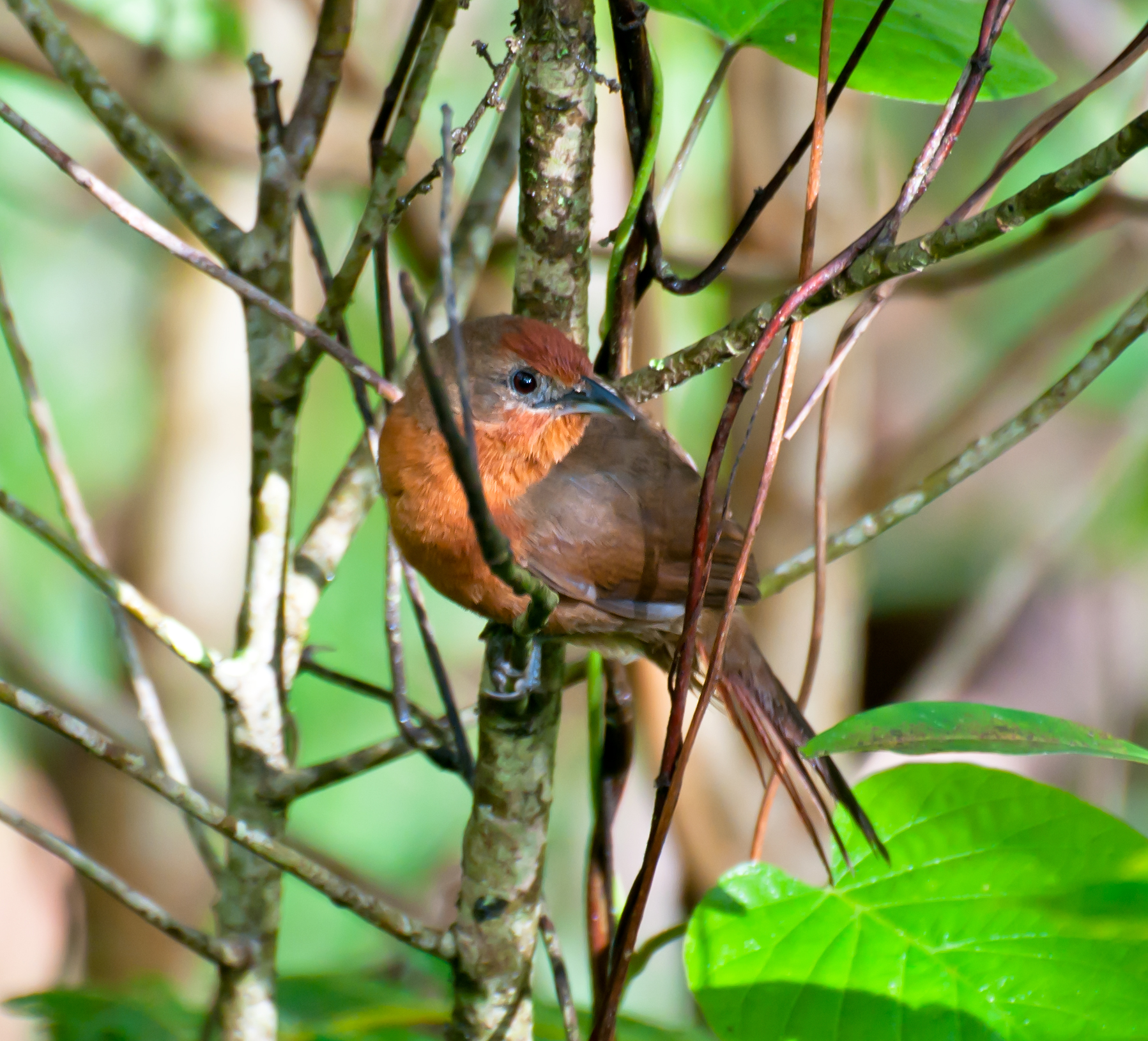
- At Reserva Guainumbi, São Luís do Paraitinga, São Paulo State, Brazil

Conservation status
- Least Concern (IUCN 3.1)

Scientific classification
- Kingdom: Animalia
- Phylum: Chordata
- Class: Aves
- Order: Passeriformes
- Family: Furnariidae
- Genus: Phacellodomus
- Species: P. ferrugineigula

Binomial name
- Phacellodomus ferrugineigula (Pelzeln, 1858)

Synonyms
- P. erythrophthalmus ferrugineigula

= Orange-breasted thornbird =

Species of bird

The orange-breasted thornbird (Phacellodomus ferrugineigula) is a species of bird in the Furnariinae subfamily of the ovenbird family Furnariidae. It is found in Brazil, Uruguay, and possibly Argentina.

== Taxonomy and systematics ==
The orange-breated thornbird is monotypic. However, was previously treated as a subspecies of what is now the orange-eyed thornbird (P. erythrophthalmus) under the common name red-eyed thornbird. In addition to differences in eye and plumage color, the two taxa have different voices and are locally sympatric in São Paulo state without evidence of interbreeding. For a while after the two were split, some taxonomic systems continued to use "red-eyed" for P. erythrophthalmus and others used it for P. ferrugineigula. The current "orange-eyed" and "orange-breasted" English names were adopted to avoid confusion with the former "red-eyed".

To further complicate matters, for a time in the early twentieth century some authors placed the former two-subspecies red-eyed thornbird alone in the genus Drioctistes. But some later authors merged that genus into Phacellodomus, and modern molecular phylogenetic analyses placed the two species firmly in Phacellodomus.

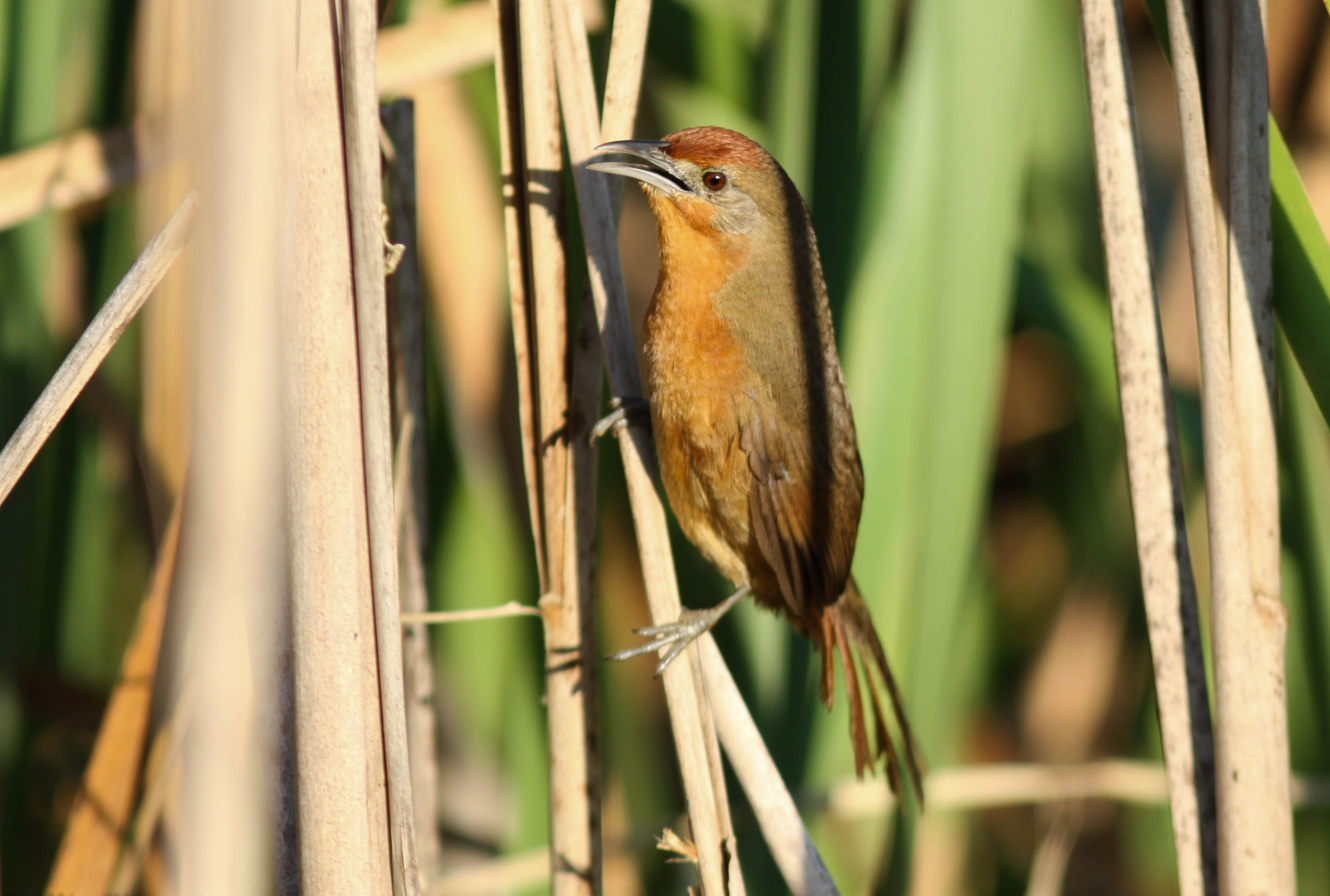
Adult

== Description ==
The orange-breasted thornbird is about 17 to 18 cm (6.7 to 7.1 in) long and weighs about 24 to 25 g (0.85 to 0.88 oz). It is a medium-sized thornbird. The sexes have the same plumage. Adults have an indistinct rufous-brown supercilium, darker brown lores, and a darker brown stripe behind the eye on an otherwise rufescent-brownish face. Their forehead and crown are bright rufous. Their back and rump are dark brownish olive and their uppertail coverts a chestnut-tinged brownish olive. Their wings are mostly warm brown that is brighter at the base of the flight feathers and duller at their ends. Their tail is brownish olive with rufous outer feathers. Their throat and breast are orange-rufous, their belly whitish, and their flanks and undertail coverts warm brown with some rufous. Their iris is red, their maxilla black, their mandible gray, and their legs and feet greenish gray to gray.

== Distribution and habitat ==
The orange-breasted thornbird is found in southeastern Brazil from Minas Gerais and Espírito Santo south to Rio Grande do Sul. It was discovered in Uruguay in 2001, including signs of breeding (a nest), in Rivera Department near the Brazilian border, and has been found regularly in other sites ever since. Undocumented sight records in Argentina lead the South American Classification Committee of the American Ornithological Society to classify it as hypothetical in that country. It inhabits thickets in freshwater marshes or along watercourses, gallery forest, swampy woodlands, and dense secondary forest. In elevation it mostly ranges from sea level to about 750 m (2,500 ft) but reaches 1,250 m (4,100 ft) in Minas Gerais and 1,100 m (3,600 ft) in Espírito Santo.

== Behavior ==
=== Movement ===
The orange-breasted thornbird is a year-round resident throughout its range.

=== Feeding ===
The orange-breasted thornbird's diet has not been studied but is believed to be mostly arthropods. It typically forages singly or in pairs, gleaning prey from vegetation in the forest's thick undergrowth.

=== Breeding ===
The orange-breasted thornbird's breeding season has not been defined but includes December to February. It is thought to be monogamous. It builds a nest that differs from those of other thornbirds; it weaves leaves and stems of grasses into a tight structure about 40 cm (1 ft) wide and high with a tube entrance. It typically hangs it from the tip of a branch up to about 1.6 m (5 ft) above either the ground or water. The clutch size is at least two eggs. The incubation period, time to fledging, and details of parental care are not known.

=== Vocalization ===
The orange-breasted thornbird's song is "a series of loud ringing notes introduced by 1–2 softer notes, 'ku, keeé-keeé-keeé-keeé-keeé-kuh' ", and it is often sung in duet by a pair.

== Status ==
The IUCN has assessed the orange-breasted thornbird as being of Least Concern. It has a large range and an unknown population size that is believed to be stable. No immediate threats have been identified. It is considered uncommon but occurs in several protected areas.
