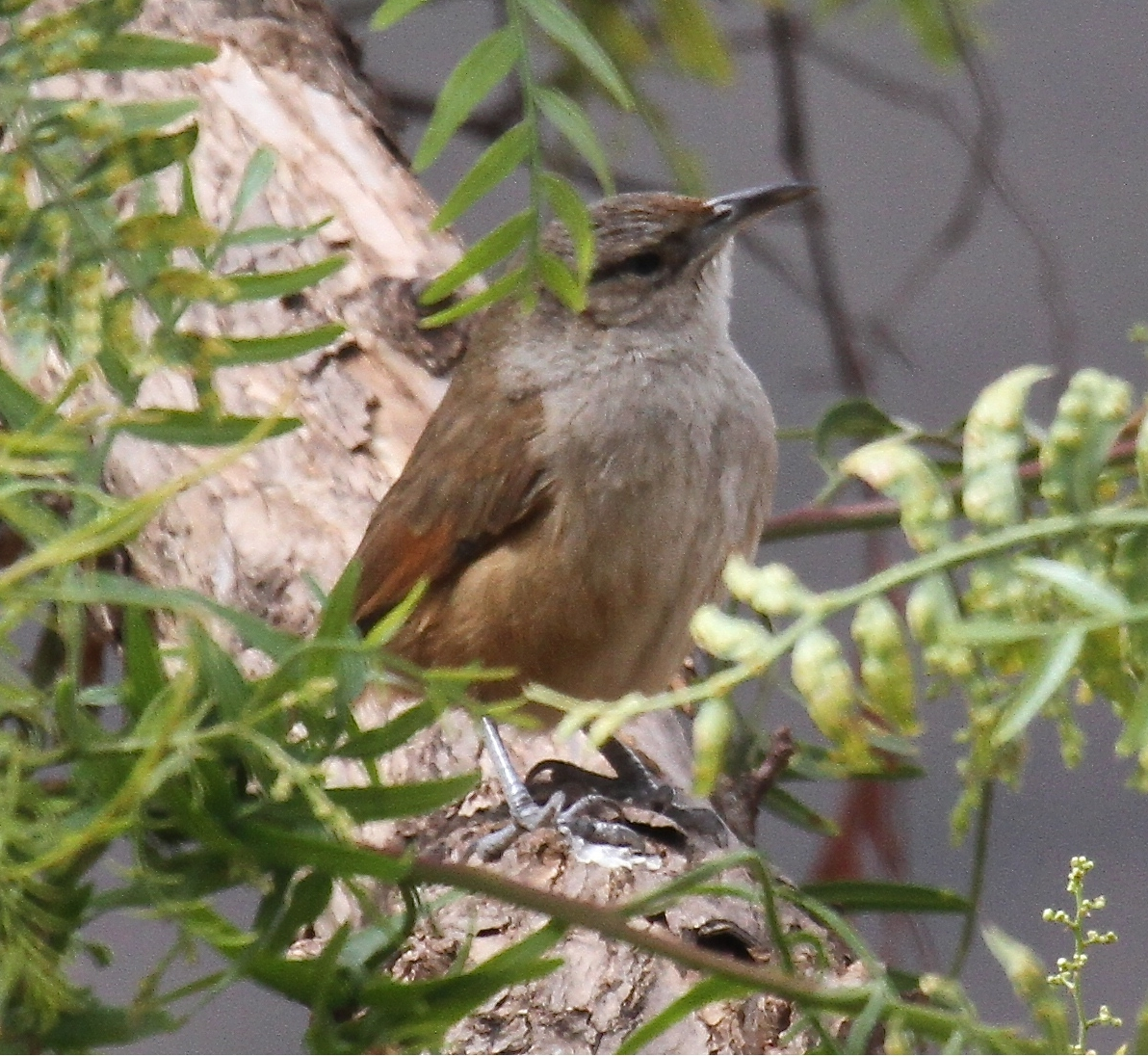

Conservation status
- Least Concern (IUCN 3.1)

Scientific classification
- Kingdom: Animalia
- Phylum: Chordata
- Class: Aves
- Order: Passeriformes
- Family: Furnariidae
- Genus: Phacellodomus
- Species: P. striaticeps

Binomial name
- Phacellodomus striaticeps (d'Orbigny & Lafresnaye, 1838)

= Streak-fronted thornbird =

Species of bird

The streak-fronted thornbird (Phacellodomus striaticeps) is a species of bird in the Furnariinae subfamily of the ovenbird family Furnariidae. It is found in Argentina, Bolivia, and Peru.

== Taxonomy and systematics ==
The streak-fronted thornbird has two subspecies, the nominate P. s. striaticeps (d'Orbigny & Lafresnaye, 1838) and P. s. griseipectus (Chapman, 1919). However, some authors consider the second to be a tentative rather than confirmed separate taxon, and note that some other populations differ more from the nominate than it does.

== Description ==
The streak-fronted thornbird is 16 to 17 cm (6.3 to 6.7 in) long and weighs about 23 to 29 g (0.81 to 1.0 oz). It is a rather small and slim thornbird. The sexes have the same plumage. Adults of the nominate subspecies have an indistinct gray-buff supercilium, blackish lores with some gray-buff, and a dark brown stripe behind the eye on an otherwise rufous-washed brownish face. Their forehead ("front") is a mix of blackish and reddish with brown streaks. Their crown is paler, browner, and unstreaked. Their upperparts are mostly rich dark brown with a slightly paler rump. Their wings are mostly dark brown with some rufescence, fuscous brown primary coverts, and flight feathers with faintly rufescent bases and dusky tips. Their tail's central pair of feathers are dark brown; the rest have increasing amounts of chestnut-rufous from their bases to the entirely chestnut-rufous outermost pair. Their throat, center of their breast, and belly are dull buff-white; the sides of their breast are light gray-brown and their flanks and undertail coverts light rufescent buff. Their iris is dark brown to gray, their maxilla dusky horn to dark gray, their mandible pale horn to pale blue-gray (often with a dusky tip), and their legs and feet greenish gray to blue-gray. Subspecies P. s. griseipectus lacks the rufous wash on its face and has darker upperparts, a grayer breast, and darker rufous flanks than the nominate.

== Distribution and habitat ==
The nominate subspecies of the streak-fronted thornbird is found in the Andes from La Paz Department in Bolivia south into northern Argentina as far as Catamarca and Tucumán provinces. Subspecies P. s. griseipectus is found in the southern Peruvian departments of Apurímac, Cuzco, and Puno. The species primarily inhabits arid montane scrublands, particularly in steep-sided valleys. It also occurs in Polylepis woodlands and locally in agricultural fields and around human dwellings. In elevation it ranges from 1,200 to 5,000 m (3,900 to 16,400 ft) but is most common between 1,500 to 3,000 m (4,900 to 9,800 ft).

== Behavior ==
=== Movement ===
The streak-fronted thornbird is mostly a year-round resident, but some members of the southernmost populations move to lower elevations after breeding.

=== Feeding ===
The streak-fronted thornbird's diet has not been defined but it is known to feed on Lepidoptera larvae. It usually forages in pairs, and at any level of the vegetation. It gleans and probes for prey on the ground, on branches, and in moss and epiphyte clumps.

=== Breeding ===
The streak-fronted thornbird breeds in the austral summer, roughly November to March or beyond. It builds a cylinder of thorny sticks that can be 1.5 m (5 ft) high and lines an interior chamber with shredded vegetation, hair, and feathers. It hangs the nest from a bush or tree, often dangling it above a cliff edge. The clutch size is usually three or four eggs and occasionally five. The incubation period, time to fledging, and details of parental care are not known.

=== Vocalization ===
The streak-fronted thornbird's song is "wip wip weep weep WEEEP weep weep weep wip wip, rising and falling in volume and pitch", and further described as "piercing, loud, and almost hysterical". Its calls are "an irregular series of squeaky 'jit' or 'tsip' notes [and] also a loud trill".

== Status ==
The IUCN has assessed the streak-fronted thornbird as being of Least Concern. It has a large range, and though its population size is not known it is believed to be stable. No immediate threats have been identified. It is considered uncommon to common. It "[t]olerates at least modest anthropogenic habitat disturbance, including fairly severe grazing", and that it often is near human dwellings suggests some adaptability.
