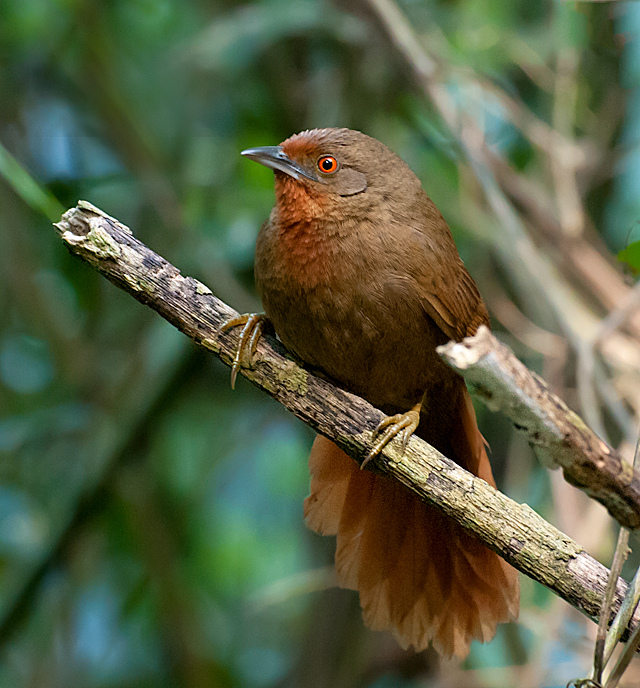
- at Serra da Cantareira State Park, São Paulo State, Brazil

Conservation status
- Least Concern (IUCN 3.1)

Scientific classification
- Kingdom: Animalia
- Phylum: Chordata
- Class: Aves
- Order: Passeriformes
- Family: Furnariidae
- Genus: Phacellodomus
- Species: P. erythrophthalmus

Binomial name
- Phacellodomus erythrophthalmus (Wied, 1821)

= Orange-eyed thornbird =

Species of bird in Brazil

The orange-eyed thornbird (Phacellodomus erythrophthalmus) is a species of bird in the Furnariinae subfamily of the ovenbird family Furnariidae. It is endemic to Brazil.

== Taxonomy and systematics ==
The orange-eyed thornbird is monotypic. However, what is now the orange-breasted thornbird (P. ferrugineigula) was previously treated as a subspecies of it under the common name red-eyed thornbird. In addition to differences in eye and plumage color, the two taxa have different voices and are locally sympatric in São Paulo state without evidence of interbreeding. For a while after the two were split, some taxonomic systems continued to use "red-eyed" for P. erythrophthalmus and others used it for P. ferrugineigula. The current "orange-eyed" and "orange-breasted" English names were adopted to avoid confusion with the former "red-eyed".

To further complicate matters, for a time in the early twentieth century some authors placed the former two-subspecies red-eyed thornbird alone in genus Drioctistes. Later some authors, but not all, merged that genus into Phacellodomus. A 2011 publication placed the two current species firmly in Phacellodomus.

== Description ==
The orange-eyed thornbird is 16 to 18 cm (6.3 to 7.1 in) long and weighs about 21 to 27 g (0.74 to 0.95 oz). It is a medium-sized thornbird. The sexes have the same plumage. Adults have an indistinct rufous-brown supercilium, darker brown lores, and a darker brown stripe behind the eye on an otherwise rufescent-brownish face. Their forehead and forecrown are bright rufous. The rest of their crown, their back, and their rump are dark brownish olive, and their uppertail coverts a chestnut-tinged brownish olive. Their wings are mostly warm brown that is brighter at the base of the flight feathers and duller at their ends. Their tail is rufous. Their throat is dark rufous and the rest of their underparts olivaceous brown that is paler in the center of the belly. Their iris is orange, their maxilla black, their mandible gray, and their legs and feet greenish gray to gray.

== Distribution and habitat ==
The orange-eyed thornbird is found in southeastern Brazil from southern Bahia south to northeastern São Paulo state. Within the Atlantic Forest biome it primarily inhabits humid lowland and montane evergreen forest and secondary forest but is also found near small marshes, along watercourses in woodlands, and in Eucalyptus plantations and urban areas. In elevation it mostly ranges from near sea level to 850 m (2,800 ft) but in the south of its range occurs locally as high as 1,700 m (5,600 ft).

== Behavior ==
=== Movement ===
The orange-eyed thornbird is a year-round resident throughout its range.

=== Feeding ===
The orange-eyed thornbird's diet has not been studied but is known to include insects. It typically forages singly or in pairs, gleaning prey from vegetation in the forest's thick undergrowth.

=== Breeding ===
The orange-eyed thornbird breeds mostly during the austral spring and summer, roughly September to February, but eggs and young have been seen outside this period. It is thought to be monogamous. It builds a boot-shaped nest of thorny sticks that can be about 40 cm (1 ft) wide and high, and lines an interior chamber with grasses. It hangs the nest from the end of a tree branch, usually 1.5 to 4.3 m (5 to 14 ft) above the ground. The usual clutch size is three eggs. The incubation period, time to fledging, and details of parental care are not known.

=== Vocalization ===
The orange-eyed thornbird's song is a "slow, descending series of up to 15 sharp, ringing tones". It has also been described as "a series of introductory notes on same pitch followed by descending series of loud notes, 'chree, chree, chree-tsrééeh-tsrééeh-tsrééeh' ". It is usually sung from a perch and sometimes as a duet by a pair.

== Status ==
The IUCN has assessed the orange-eyed thornbird as being of Least Concern. It has a fairly large range but an unknown population size that is believed to be decreasing. No immediate threats have been identified. It is considered uncommon but occurs in several protected areas. "This species' restriction to narrow band of lowlands of SE Brazil could render it vulnerable in the future."
