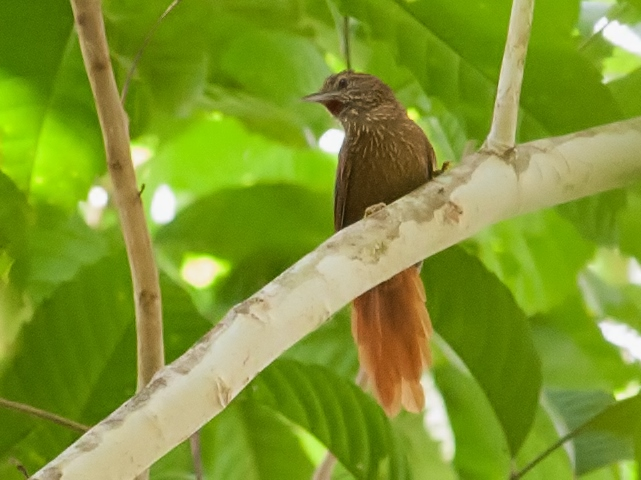

Conservation status
- Vulnerable (IUCN 3.1)

Scientific classification
- Kingdom: Animalia
- Phylum: Chordata
- Class: Aves
- Order: Passeriformes
- Family: Furnariidae
- Genus: Thripophaga
- Species: T. amacurensis

Binomial name
- Thripophaga amacurensis Hilty et al., 2013

= Delta Amacuro softtail =

Species of bird

The Delta Amacuro softtail (Thripophaga amacurensis) is a Vulnerable species of bird in the Furnariinae subfamily of the ovenbird family Furnariidae. It is endemic to the southern Orinoco Delta in northeastern Venezuela.

== Taxonomy and systematics ==
The Delta Amacuro softtail was described in 2013 and named for the Venezuelan state of Delta Amacuro in which it occurs. The species had first been collected in 1899, and observed and again collected in the twentieth century, but was not recognized as a distinct species until a series of expeditions beginning in 2004.

The Delta Amacuro softtail is monotypic.

== Description ==
The Delta Amacuro softtail is about 17 cm (6.7 in) long and weighs 26 to 30 g (0.92 to 1.1 oz). The sexes have almost the same plumage. Adult males have olive-buff lores with dark gray tips and a grayish olive eyering; the rest of their head is brownish olive with yellow-buff spots. Their upper back is brownish olive with yellow-buff streaks. The rest of their back is plain warm brown and their rump and uppertail coverts rufous-brown or cinnamon. Their tail is cinnamon that is brighter on its upper side. Their upperwing coverts are warm olive-brown to fulvous-brown. Their primaries and secondaries are dusky with warmer brown edges on the outer webs and their tertials are rufescent brown. Their chin is cinnamon-buff, their throat rufous chestnut, and their breast and belly brownish olive with buffy teardrops that become less well defined on the latter. Their flanks and thighs are plain brownish olive and their undertail coverts tinged warm ochraceous tawny. Their iris is rusty brown, their bill steel gray with dusky at the maxilla's base and pale pink at the mandible's, and their legs and feet dull yellowish green. Females differ only in having a paler chin and throat than males.

== Distribution and habitat ==
The Delta Amacuro softtail is found in the southern part of the Orinoco River Delta in the northern Venezuelan state of Delta Amacuro. It is known from only four sites along the Brazo Imataca, a subsidiary channel of the Orinoco. It inhabits mature floodplain forest along streams and rivers. Some small marshes and seasonally flooded savanna are interspersed. The area floods between May and October.

== Behavior ==
=== Movement ===
The Delta Amacuro softtail's movements, if any, are not known.

=== Feeding ===
The Delta Amacuro softtail's diet is not known. It forages alone or in pairs, poking into trapped debris, vine tangles, and other foliage, usually between about 10 and 18 m (30 and 60 ft) above the ground.

=== Breeding ===
Nothing is known about the Delta Amacuro softtail's breeding biology.

=== Vocalization ===
The Delta Amacuro softtail's song is often sung in duet. It is "a long chattery rattle consisting of short, loud notes given by one bird (perhaps male), then joined for variable period of time by a second bird making harsh, even shorter notes; after this, volume and tempo gradually decrease until song typically ends with only the first bird singing".

== Status ==
The IUCN originally assessed the Delta Amacuro softtail as Endangered but since 2021 has rated it Vulnerable. It has a very small range and an unknown population size that is believed to be decreasing. "In the eastern part of its range there appear to be no immediate threats, but in the west deforestation may be affecting this species. Logging, oil exploration and clearance for agriculture are particular threats; and by April 2010 the most westerly of its four sites had been deforested." "The known range is entirely unprotected, falling outside existing protected areas. Surveys [are] needed to define the precise range and population size."
