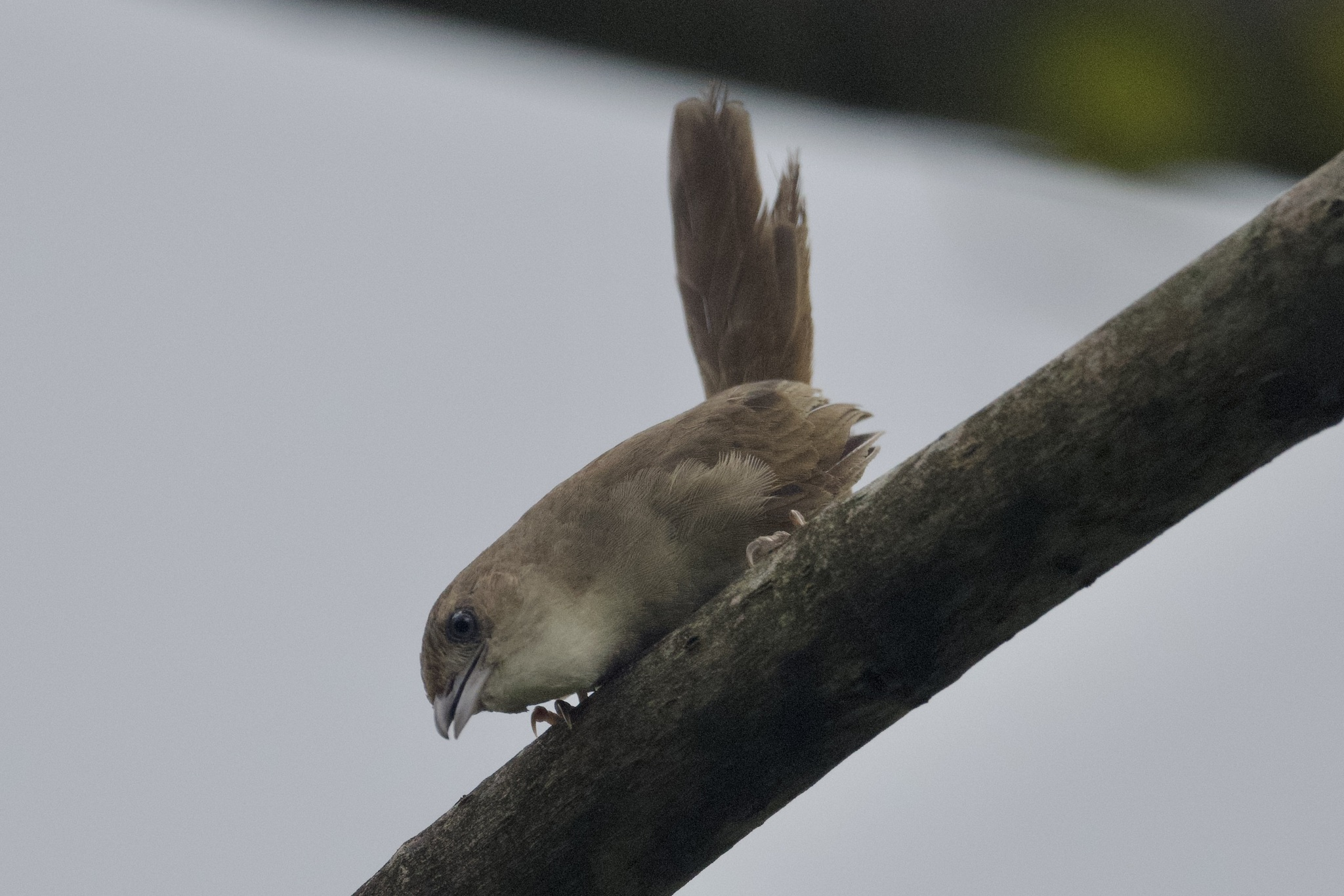

Conservation status
- Least Concern (IUCN 3.1)

Scientific classification
- Kingdom: Animalia
- Phylum: Chordata
- Class: Aves
- Order: Passeriformes
- Family: Furnariidae
- Genus: Phacellodomus
- Species: P. inornatus

Binomial name
- Phacellodomus inornatus Ridgway, 1887

= Plain thornbird =

Species of bird

The plain thornbird (Phacellodomus inornatus) is a species of bird in the Furnariinae subfamily of the ovenbird family Furnariidae. It is found in Colombia and Venezuela.

== Taxonomy and systematics ==
The plain thornbird was formally described in 1887 by the American ornithologist Robert Ridgway based on a specimen collected in Caracas, Venezuela. He coined the binomial name Phacellodomus inornatus. Its specific epithet is Latin meaning "plain" or "unadorned".

The plain thornbird's taxonomy is unsettled. The International Ornithological Committee (IOC), BirdLife International's Handbook of the Birds of the World (HBW), and the Clements taxonomy follow a 2020 study that compared mitochondrial DNA sequences and treat it as a species with two subspecies, the nominate P. i. inornatus (Ridgway, 1887) and P. i. castilloi (Phelps Jr & Aveledo, 1987). The South American Classification Committee of the American Ornithological Society treats the two taxa as subspecies of the rufous-fronted thornbird (P. rufifrons).

== Description ==
The plain thornbird is 16 to 17 cm (6.3 to 6.7 in) long and weighs about 20 to 31 g (0.71 to 1.1 oz). The sexes have the same plumage. Adults of the nominate subspecies have a dull brown stripe behind the eye on an otherwise pale buff-brown face. Their crown and upperparts are dull brown. Their wings are mostly dull brown with darker brown primary coverts and some rufescence. Their tail is dull brown. Their throat is pale and the rest of their underparts are mostly dirty buff-white. Their iris is brown to grayish white, their bill dark with a yellowish base to the mandible, and their legs and feet gray. Juveniles have mottled upperparts. Subspecies P. i. castilloi has a somewhat grayish face, somewhat olivaceous (less rufescent) upperparts, and more brownish tail and undertail coverts.

== Distribution and habitat ==
The nominate subspecies of the plain thornbird is found in north-central Venezuela between the states of Falcón and Miranda. Subspecies P. i. castilloi is found in central and western Venezuela from Sucre and Monagas west into northeastern Colombia as far as Meta Department. The species inhabits a variety of landscapes whose common features are dense thickets and at least some trees. They include arid lowland scrublands; tropical deciduous, gallery, and secondary forest; and llanos and savannah grasslands. In elevation it mostly ranges from sea level to 950 m (3,100 ft) but reaches 1,500 m (4,900 ft) in Colombia.

== Behavior ==
=== Movement ===
The plain thornbird is a year-round resident throughout its range.

=== Feeding ===
The plain thornbird feeds on arthropods. It usually forages in pairs or small groups that include nest helpers but only rarely joins mixed-species feeding flocks. It mostly forages on the ground but will do so as high as the forest's mid-level. It mostly gleans its prey from leaf litter but will search dead foliage in bushes.

=== Breeding ===
The plain thornbird's breeding season has not been fully defined but in general can span from April to November. At least in Venezuela, two broods in a year are common. It is thought to be monogamous and maintains the pair bond year-round. Young from previous broods sometimes remain, and help with nest building, maintenance, and defence. The species makes an extremely large nest for its own size. It constructs a cylinder of sticks (including thorny ones) that can be 2.5 m (8 ft) long and has several chambers and entrances. Often more than one nest is built in a territory, and old nests can be renovated and reused. The clutch size is three eggs. The incubation period is 16 to 17 days and fledging occurs 21 to 22 days after hatch. Both parents incubate the clutch; they and helpers if present provision nestlings.

=== Vocalization ===
The plain thornbird's song is "a bright, chippery and energetic series of loud 'chit' or 'chee' notes, often given in duet, which accelerates slightly, before gradually slowing and dropping in pitch" and is frequently repeated. Its calls include "a sharp 'chip' or 'chek, or a metallic 'tsi' ".

== Status ==
The IUCN has assessed the plain thornbird as being of Least Concern. It has a large range, and though its population size is not known it is believed to be stable. No immediate threats have been identified. It is considered fairly common to common in most of its range and "is tolerant of at least moderate anthropogenic habitat disturbance".
