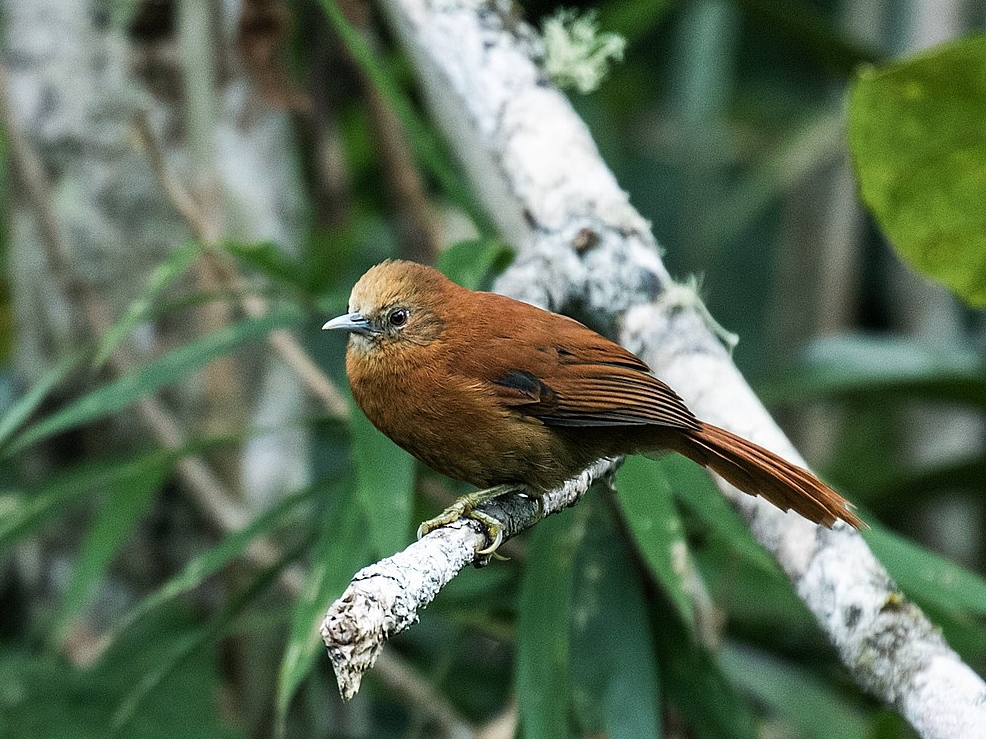

Conservation status
- Near Threatened (IUCN 3.1)

Scientific classification
- Kingdom: Animalia
- Phylum: Chordata
- Class: Aves
- Order: Passeriformes
- Family: Furnariidae
- Genus: Cranioleuca
- Species: C. berlepschi

Binomial name
- Cranioleuca berlepschi (Hellmayr, 1905)

Synonyms
- Thripophaga berlepschi

= Russet-mantled softtail =

Species of bird

The russet-mantled softtail (Cranioleuca berlepschi) is a Near Threatened species of bird in the Furnariinae subfamily of the ovenbird family Furnariidae. It is endemic to northern Peru.

== Taxonomy and systematics ==
The russet-mantled softtail was originally described in genus Thripophaga. Based on a large molecular phylogenetic study of the suboscines published in 2020 it was moved by worldwide taxonomic systems to genus Cranioleuca. The South American Classification Committee of the American Ornithological Society retains the russet-mantled softtail in Thripophaga but is seeking a formal proposal to move it to Cranioleuca.

The russet-mantled softtail is monotypic.

== Description ==
The russet-mantled softtail is 16.5 to 18 cm (6.5 to 7.1 in) long and weighs about 23 g (0.81 oz). It is a small, slender, furnariid with a slender bill. The sexes have the same plumage. Adults have a rufous face. Their forecrown is whitish or pale grayish brown and their crown dull brown. Their nape and back are rufous and their rump and uppertail coverts tawny olive. Their tail and wings are rufous. Their throat is ochraceous buff, their breast rufous, their belly tawny olive, and their crissum tawny rufous. Their iris is chestnut or reddish brown, their bill pale blue-gray with a gray base to the maxilla, and their legs and feet yellow-olive. Juveniles have a whitish crown and supercilium, an ochraceous tawny face, a pale brown back with an olivaceous tinge, a whitish throat, and a buffy breast with brown scaling.

== Distribution and habitat ==
The russet-mantled softtail is found only in Peru, on the eastern Andes south of the Marañón River between the departments of Amazonas and La Libertad and perhaps further south into Huánuco. It inhabits elfin forest and the edge of humid montane forest. It seems to favor areas with Chusquea bamboo and much moss and bromeliads. In elevation it mostly ranges between 3,050 and 3,400 m (10,000 and 11,200 ft) but occurs locally down to 2,500 m (8,200 ft) and perhaps 1,800 m (5,900 ft).

== Behavior ==
=== Movement ===
The russet-mantled softtail is a year-round resident throughout its range.

=== Feeding ===
The russet-mantled softtail feeds on arthropods but details are not known. It forages in pairs or in small groups thought to be families, usually as part of a mixed-species feeding flock. It gleans prey from dead leaf clusters and branches, usually within about 3 m (10 ft) of the ground.

=== Breeding ===
The russet-mantled softtail's breeding season appears to be June to September. Nothing else is known about its breeding behavior.

=== Vocalization ===
The russet-mantled softtail's song is "a short, descending, high-pitched chatter: tchee tchee-tchi-tchi'trrr".

== Status ==
The IUCN originally assessed the russet-mantled softtail as Near Threatened, then in 2000 as Endangered, in 2004 as Vulnerable, and since 2021 again as Near Threatened. It has a restricted range and a population size estimated at between 1000 and 2500 mature individuals that is believed to be decreasing. "Regular burning of páramo grassland adjacent to elfin forest, to promote the growth of fresh shoots for livestock, has lowered the treeline by several hundred metres, and continues to destroy large areas of this species's habitat. Small and fragmented remnant elfin forests are additionally threatened by clearance for agriculture and grazing."
