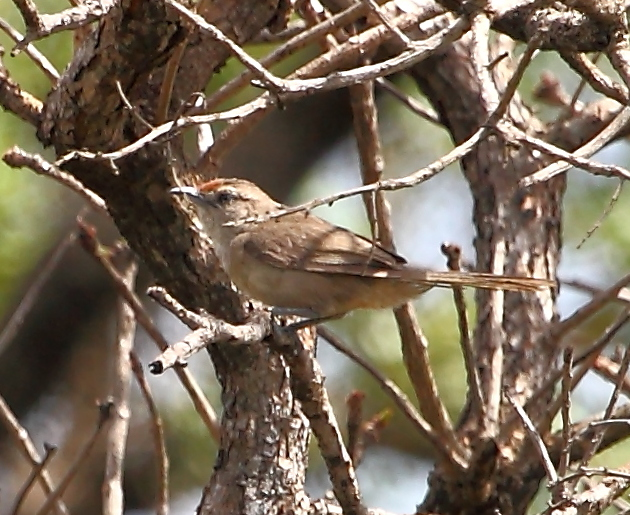
- at Serra da Canastra National Park, Minas Gerais state, Brazil.

Conservation status
- Least Concern (IUCN 3.1)

Scientific classification
- Kingdom: Animalia
- Phylum: Chordata
- Class: Aves
- Order: Passeriformes
- Family: Furnariidae
- Genus: Phacellodomus
- Species: P. rufifrons

Binomial name
- Phacellodomus rufifrons (Wied-Neuwied, M, 1821)

= Rufous-fronted thornbird =

Species of bird

The rufous-fronted thornbird, or common thornbird, (Phacellodomus rufifrons) is a species of bird in the family Furnariidae. It is found in Brazil, Bolivia, Argentina, Ecuador, Paraguay, and Peru.

== Taxonomy and systematics ==
The rufous-fronted thornbird's taxonomy is unsettled. The International Ornithological Committee (IOC), BirdLife International's Handbook of the Birds of the World (HBW), and the Clements taxonomy assign it these four subspecies:

- P. r. peruvianus Hellmayr, 1925
- P. r. specularis Hellmayr, 1925
- P. r. rufifrons (Wied, 1821)
- P. r. sincipitalis Cabanis, 1883

The South American Classification Committee of the American Ornithological Society adds two more, P. r. inornatus (Ridgway, 1887) and P. r. castilloi (Phelps Jr & Aveledo, 1987). The IOC, HBW, and Clements treat those taxa as the plain thornbird (P. inornatus).

This article follows the four-subspecies model.

== Description ==
The rufous-fronted thornbird is 16 to 17 cm (6.3 to 6.7 in) long and weighs about 18 to 31 g (0.63 to 1.1 oz). The sexes have the same plumage. Adults of the nominate subspecies P. r. rufifrons have a dull buff supercilium that continues past the eye, a dark brown stripe behind the eye, and dark grayish lores on an otherwise pale buff-brown face. Their forehead ("front") is dark rufous and their crown dark brownish with some paler streaks. Their upperparts are a slightly lighter dark brown. Their wings are mostly dull brown with darker brown primary coverts. Their tail is dull brown. Their underparts are mostly brownish white, with darker brownish sides, richer brownish flanks, and pale undertail coverts with a rufescent tinge. Their iris is brown to grayish white, their maxilla blackish to dark gray, their mandible gray to blue-gray, and their legs and feet gray. Juveniles do not have the rufous forehead and their underparts are mottled.

Subspecies P. r. sincipitalis is similar to the nominate but with slightly brighter and more rufescent upperparts and flanks and slightly more rufous flight feathers. P. r. peruvianus has more but paler rufous on the forehead than the nominate, and brighter and more fulvous flanks. P. r. specularis has more and deeper rufous on the forehead than the nominate, and a largish rufous patch on the flight feathers and rufescent outer tail feathers.

== Distribution and habitat ==
The rufous-fronted thornbird has a disjunct distribution. The subspecies are found thus:

- P. r. peruvianus: the upper watershed of the Marañón River in extreme southern Ecuador's Zamora-Chinchipe Province and the northern Peruvian departments of Amazonas, Cajamarca, and San Martín.
- P. r. specularis: northeastern Brazil's Pernambuco state
- P. r. rufifrons: eastern Brazil from Maranhão south to São Paulo state
- P. r. sincipitalis: eastern Bolivia, Mato Grosso and Mato Grosso do Sul states in Brazil, north-central Paraguay, and northwestern Argentina as far south as Tucumán Province

The rufous-fronted thornbird inhabits a variety of landscapes whose common features are dense thickets and at least some trees. They include arid scrublands both lowland and montane; tropical deciduous, gallery, and secondary forest; cerrado; and savannah. In Brazil it mostly occurs below 1,300 m (4,300 ft); elsewhere it occurs locally as high as 2,000 m (6,600 ft).

== Behavior ==
=== Movement ===
The rufous-fronted thornbird is a year-round resident throughout its range.

=== Feeding ===
The rufous-fronted thornbird feeds on arthropods. It usually forages in pairs or small groups that include nest helpers but only rarely joins mixed-species feeding flocks. It mostly forages on the ground but will do so as high as the forest's mid-level. It mostly gleans its prey from leaf litter but will search dead foliage in bushes.

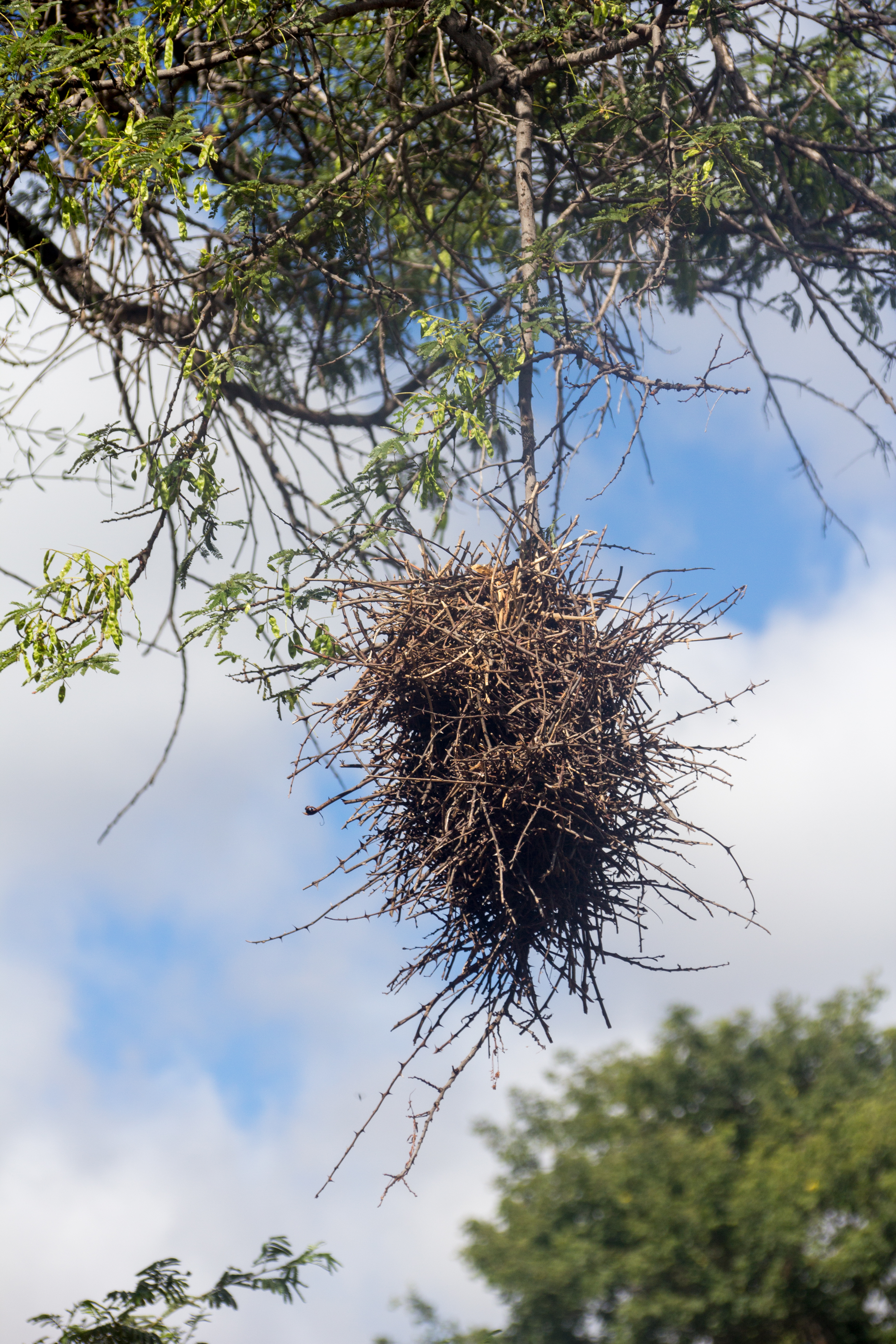
A thornbird's nest in Paraíba, Brazil

=== Breeding ===
The rufous-fronted thornbird breeds in the austral spring and summer, roughly from September to as late as April. It is thought to be monogamous and maintains the pair bond year-round. Young from previous broods sometimes remain, and help with nest building, maintenance, and defence. The species makes an extremely large nest for its own size. It constructs a cylinder of sticks (including thorny ones) that can be 2.5 m (8 ft) long and has several chambers and entrances. Often more than one nest is built in a territory, and old nests can be renovated and reused. The clutch size is two to four eggs. The incubation period and time to fledging are not known. Both parents, and helpers if present, provision nestlings.

=== Vocalization ===
The rufous-fronted thornbird's song is a "rather unstructured series of very high, mewing 'stjew' notes, rising, falling, and repeating". Its calls include an "extr. high, sharp 'sipsipsip-sip-' " and "a sharp 'chip' or 'chek, or a metallic 'tsi'.

== Status ==
The IUCN has assessed the rufous-fronted thornbird as being of Least Concern. It has a very large, though disjunct, range. Its population size is not known but is believed to be stable. No immediate threats have been identified. It is considered fairly common to common in most of its range and occurs in many protected areas. It "[t]olerates at least moderate anthropogenic habitat disturbance".
