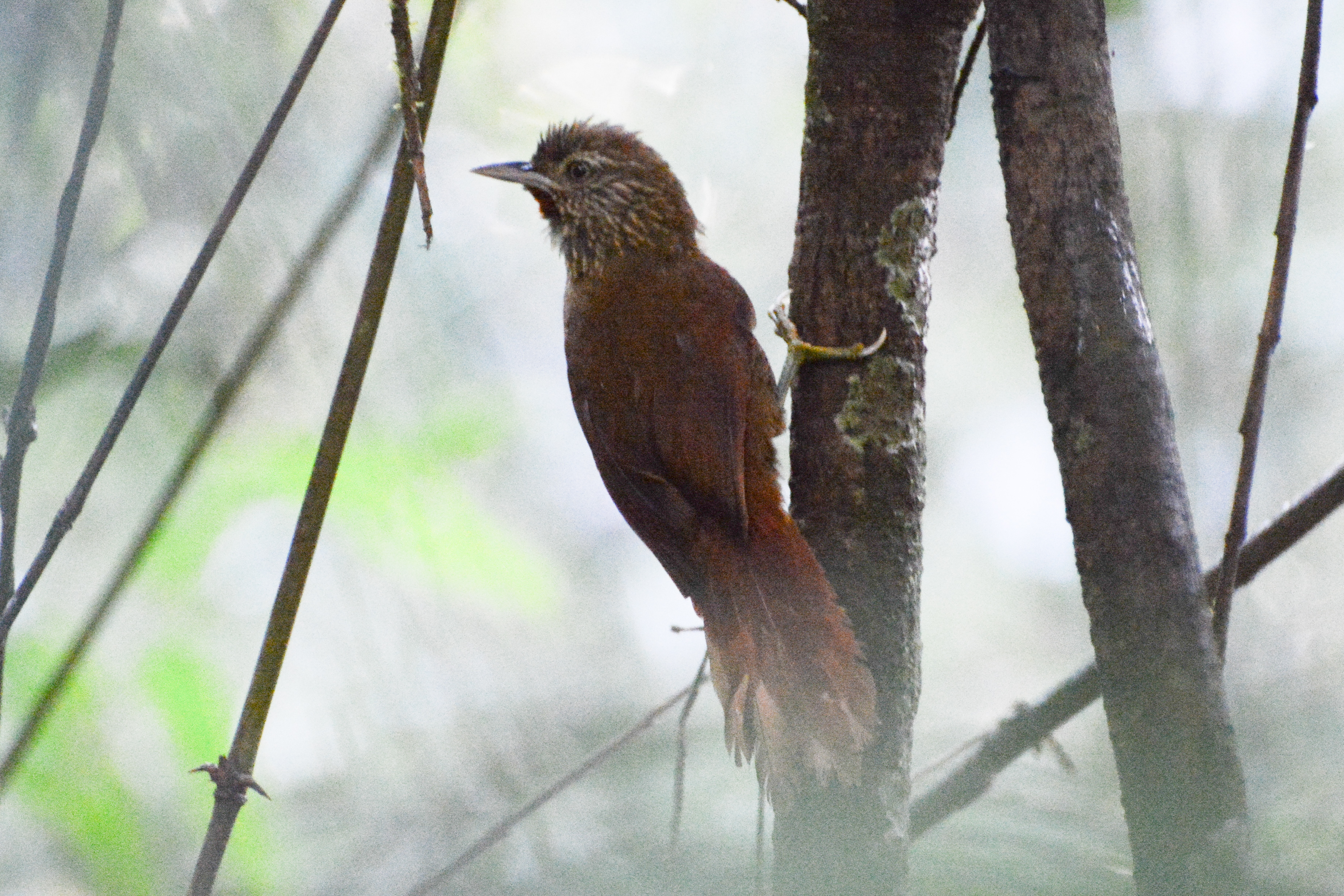
- In várzea forest near Inírida, Colombia

Conservation status
- Vulnerable (IUCN 3.1)

Scientific classification
- Kingdom: Animalia
- Phylum: Chordata
- Class: Aves
- Order: Passeriformes
- Family: Furnariidae
- Genus: Thripophaga
- Species: T. cherriei

Binomial name
- Thripophaga cherriei Berlepsch & Hartert, 1902

= Orinoco softtail =

Species of bird

The Orinoco softtail (Thripophaga cherriei) is a Vulnerable species of bird in the Furnariinae subfamily of the ovenbird family Furnariidae. It is found in Colombia and Venezuela.

== Taxonomy and systematics ==
The Orinoco softtail is monotypic.

The Orinoco softtail's specific epithet honors George Kruck Cherrie, who collected the first two specimens in 1899 on the Orinoco River in Venezuela.

== Description ==
The Orinoco softtail is 15.5 to 17.5 cm (6.1 to 6.9 in) long. The sexes have the same plumage. Adults have a faint buff or whitish supercilium on a otherwise buff-streaked brownish face. Their forehead is brown with buff streaks and their crown medium brown with some faint yellowish spots. Their back is rufescent brown with a faint olive cast, their rump rufescent, and their uppertail coverts reddish chestnut. Their tail is dark rufous to reddish chestnut. Their wings are mostly dark rufous chestnut with rufous-cinnamon at the base of the flight feathers. Their chin is a conspicuous tawny orange and their upper throat chestnut rufous. Their lower throat, neck, and breast are raw umber brown or olive brown with sharp buff streaks. Their belly is paler brown and their undertail coverts reddish rufous or ferruginous. Their iris is dark red, their bill gray to blackish, and their legs and feet dull pinkish olive.

== Distribution and habitat ==
The Orinoco softtail was long thought to be endemic to the area in south-central Venezuela where it was first collected. As of mid-2023, the International Ornithological Committee still lists it that way. However, in 2012 it was confirmed to be present in Colombia, in the departments of Guainía and Vichada adjacent to Venezuela. The South American Classification Committee of the American Ornithological Society, the Clements taxonomy, and BirdLife International list it as present in both countries. The full extent of its range has not been determined.

The Orinoco softtail inhabits the dense understory along watercourses in várzea forest. Vines and bamboo are important components of its habitat. It has a very small elevational range of between about 120 and 150 m (400 and 500 ft) above sea level.

== Behavior ==
=== Movement ===
The Orinoco softtail is thought to be a year-round resident.

=== Feeding ===
The Orinoco softtail's diet has not been described. The one observation of a feeding bird described it foraging in dead leaves and on vines in the forest understory. It has been observed in mixed-species foraging flocks. Nothing else is known about its feeding behavior.

=== Breeding ===
The Orinoco softtail's breeding season had not been defined, but nest building has been documented in early March (early stages) and late November (near completion). The nests were bundles of sticks, rootlets, dead leaves, and other plant material suspended from a branch. Nothing else is known about the species' breeding biology.

=== Vocalization ===
The Orinoco sofftail's song "consists of 2‒4 nasal notes followed by a rattled series of short notes at a pace of about 15‒20 notes/second". It is typically sung in early morning and often in duet. The species' calls include a "strident grating scolding chrr", a nasal "chi-tew", and "short chik and very faint chup notes".

== Status ==
The IUCN originally assessed the Orinoco softtail as Threatened but since 1994 has rated it as Vulnerable. It has a very small range, very specific habitat requirements, and an estimated population of 250 to 1000 mature individuals that is believed to be decreasing. "The principal threat appears to be loss of habitat through unsustainable, shifting cultivation practices." No part of its known range is protected.
