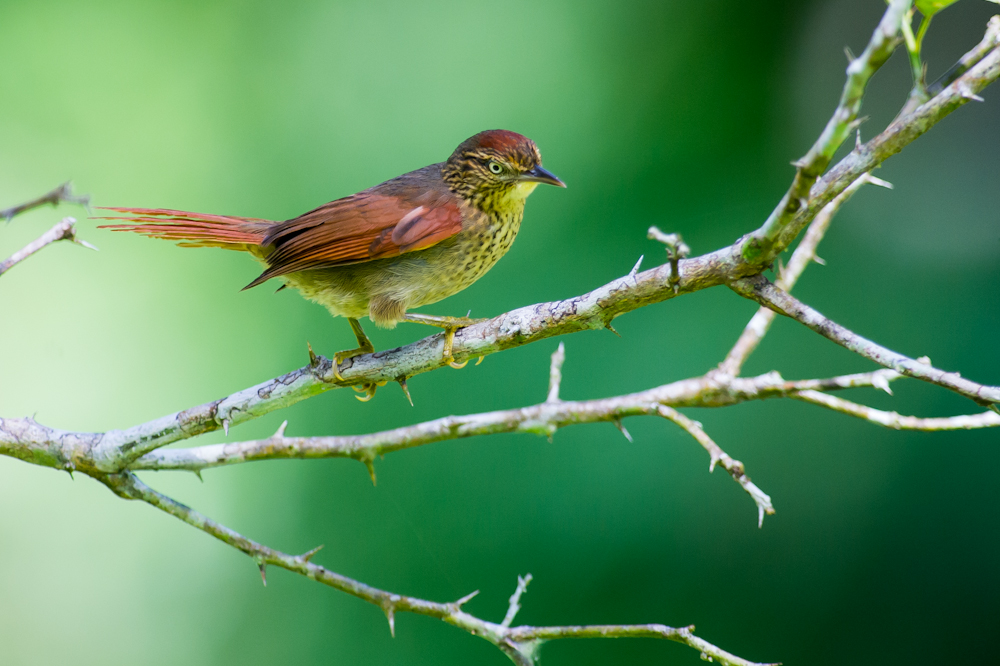

Conservation status
- Least Concern (IUCN 3.1)

Scientific classification
- Kingdom: Animalia
- Phylum: Chordata
- Class: Aves
- Order: Passeriformes
- Family: Furnariidae
- Genus: Thripophaga
- Species: T. gutturata

Binomial name
- Thripophaga gutturata (d'Orbigny & Lafresnaye, 1838)

Synonyms
- Cranioleuca gutturata

= Speckled spinetail =

Species of bird

The speckled spinetail (Thripophaga gutturata) is a species of bird in the Furnariinae subfamily of the ovenbird family Furnariidae. It is found in Bolivia, Brazil, Colombia, Ecuador, French Guiana, Peru, Suriname, and Venezuela.

== Taxonomy and systematics ==
The speckled spinetail was previously place in genus Cranioleuca but a study published in 2011 places it in Thripophaga. BirdLife International's Handbook of the Birds of the World made the change by 2018 and the International Ornithological Committee and the Clements taxonomy followed suit in 2023. The South American Classification Committee of the American Ornithological Society retains the old genus but acknowledges the need for the change and is seeking a formal proposal for it.

The speckled spinetail is monotypic. However, there are plumages differences across its range. At least two subspecies in addition to the nominate have been proposed, and "reanalysis of variation throughout range is required".

== Description ==
The spectacled spinetail is 13 to 15 cm (5.1 to 5.9 in) long and weighs 13 to 17 g (0.46 to 0.60 oz). Adults have an ochraceous brown supercilium, ear coverts, and malars; the last two have dark brownish speckles. Their crown is dark chestnut that becomes dark brown on the hindcrown and upper back. Their lower back is a richer brown that continues with a rufescent tinge on the rump and uppertail coverts. Their tail is rufous; despite the species' "spinetail" name, the feathers are rounded. Their wings are dark chestnut with an ochraceous bend and dark fuscous tips on the flight feathers. Their chin is dull yellow, their throat and breast tawny-buff with dark brown triangular spots, and their belly, flanks, and undertail coverts tawny-buff with fainter spots. Their iris is pale yellowish to brown, their maxilla black to gray, their mandible gray to blue-gray (often with a pinkish base), and their legs and feet olive to brownish yellow. Juveniles have a brown crown (not chestnut), a grayish olive back, and few or no spots on the underparts.

== Distribution and habitat ==
The speckled spinetail is found in much of the Amazon Basin. It occurs in southeastern Colombia, southern Venezuela, eastern Ecuador and Peru, northern Bolivia, Suriname, French Guiana, and most of western Amazonian Brazil. It inhabits lowland evergreen forest, mostly várzea and the transition zone between it and dryer landscapes. It occurs locally in terra firme forest. It favors areas with dense vines. It mostly occurs below an elevation of 400 m (1,300 ft) but locally is found as high as 1,100 m (3,600 ft).

== Behavior ==
=== Movement ===
The speckled spinetail is a year-round resident throughout its range.

=== Feeding ===
The speckled spinetail feeds on arthropods; cockroaches (Blattodea) and "typical bugs" (Heteroptera) dominate its diet though other insects and spiders have been recorded. It forages singly or in pairs, frequently in mixed-species feeding flocks, and usually from the forest's mid-storey to its subcanopy. It acrobatically hitches and hops up trunks and along branches. Much of its feeding is from dead leaf clusters; it also probes and gleans from live vegetation, bark, moss, epiphytes, and palm fronds.

=== Breeding ===
The speckled spinetail's breeding season has not been detailed though in Peru it appears to begin with nest building in August. The nest is a cone of moss tapering to an entrance hole and suspended from a branch. The species is believed to be monogamous. Nothing else is known about its breeding biology.

=== Vocalization ===
One song of the speckled spinetail is " a quavering, descending trill with introductory note, tch-t-t-t-t-t-t-t-t-t-t. Another is "a short series of high piercing notes, 'tsee-tsee-tsee-tsee-tsee-tsee' ". Its alarm call is a "short, low rattle".

== Status ==
The IUCN has assessed the speckled spinetail as being of Least Concern. It has an extremely large range, and though its population size is not known it is believed to be stable. No immediate threats have been identified. It is considered rare on the western edges of its range and fairly common in its core, but is often overlooked. It occurs in at least one protected area, in Peru.
