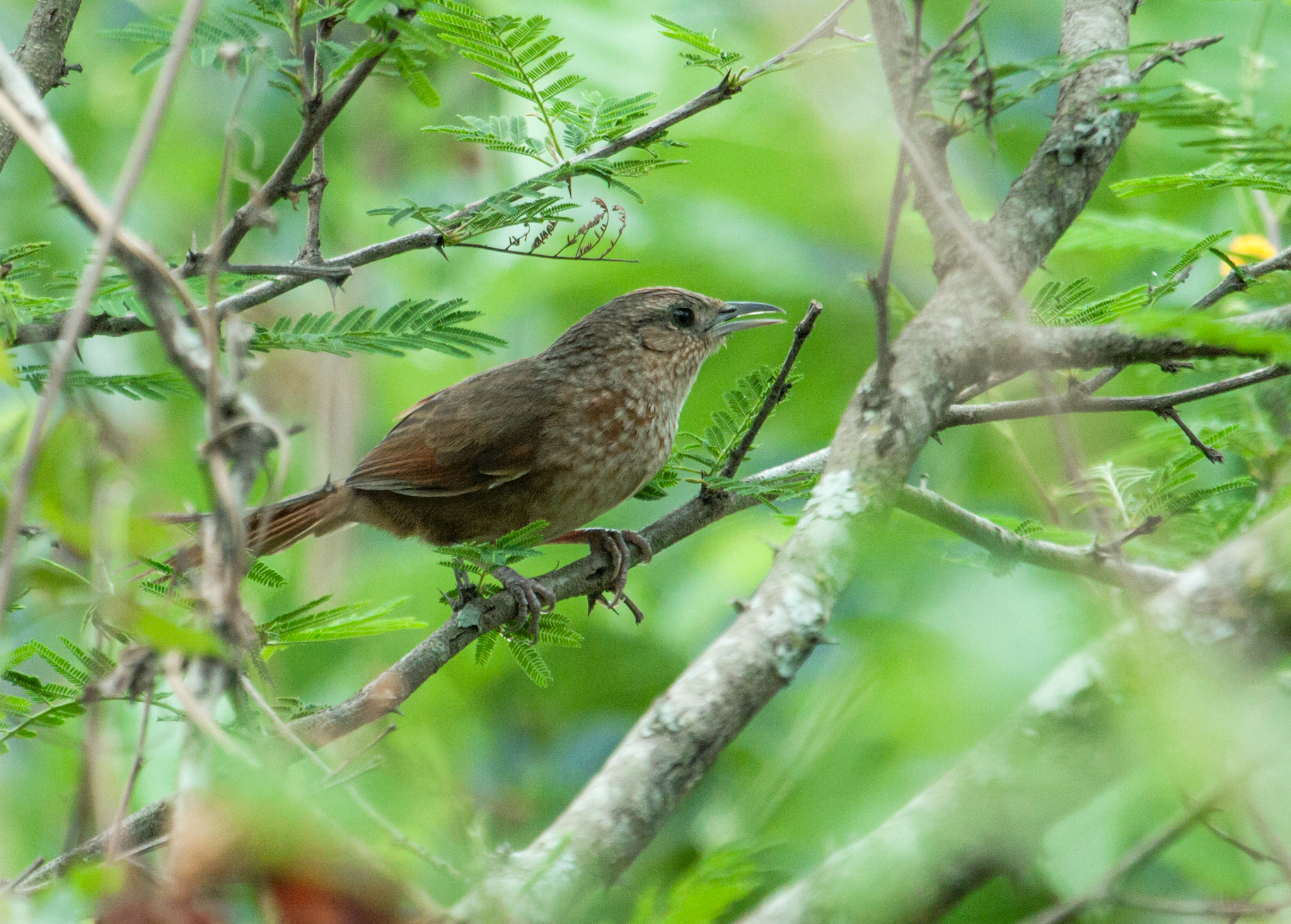

Conservation status
- Least Concern (IUCN 3.1)

Scientific classification
- Kingdom: Animalia
- Phylum: Chordata
- Class: Aves
- Order: Passeriformes
- Family: Furnariidae
- Genus: Phacellodomus
- Species: P. maculipectus

Binomial name
- Phacellodomus maculipectus Cabanis, 1883

= Spot-breasted thornbird =

Species of bird

The spot-breasted thornbird (Phacellodomus maculipectus) is a species of bird in the Furnariinae subfamily of the ovenbird family Furnariidae. It is found in Argentina and Bolivia.

== Taxonomy and systematics ==
The spot-breasted thornbird was long considered a subspecies of the freckle-breasted thornbird (P. striaticollis), but the two are not closely related. The spot-breasted and the greater thornbird (P. ruber) are sister species.

The spot-breasted thornbird is monotypic.

== Description ==
The spot-breasted thornbird is 17 to 18 cm (6.7 to 7.1 in) long and weighs about 19 to 26 g (0.67 to 0.92 oz). It is a medium-sized thornbird. The sexes have the same plumage. Adults have a light brownish supercilium that extends beyond the eye and an indistinct dull brown stripe behind the eye on an otherwise light brownish face. Their crown is rufous-brown with whitish streaks, their back dull reddish brown, and their rump and uppertail coverts a slightly paler reddish brown. Their wings are mostly shades of brown with darker brown primary coverts and flight feathers with rufous edges and dusky tips. Their tail's central pair of feathers are dull rufescent brown and the rest dull rufous. Their throat is dingy whitish, their breast dark brownish with conspicuous white speckles, their belly brownish white, and their flanks and undertail coverts darkish gray-brown. Their iris is gray, their maxilla blackish to brownish, their mandible gray, and their legs and feet gray to greenish gray.

== Distribution and habitat ==
The spot-breasted thornbird is found from the Bolivian departments of Cochabamba and Santa Cruz south into northern Argentina as far as La Rioja Province. It inhabits dry to somewhat humid montane woodland (e.g. Alnus and Podocarpus) and scrublands. In elevation it mostly ranges between 1,000 and 2,500 m (3,300 and 8,200 ft) but occurs locally as high as 3,100 m (10,200 ft).

== Behavior ==
=== Movement ===
The spot-breasted thornbird is a year-round resident throughout its range.

=== Feeding ===
The spot-breasted thornbird feeds on adult and larval arthropods. It usually forages in pairs. It captures prey by gleaning from the ground or from vegetation as high as the forest's understorey.

=== Breeding ===
The spot-breasted thornbird breeds in the austral spring and summer, starting in September. It builds a cylindrical nest of thorny sticks that can be about 30 cm (1 ft) high and lines an interior chamber with grass. It hangs the nest near the end a tree branch, usually 3 to 4 m (10 to 13 ft) above the ground. The clutch size is usually three eggs. The incubation period, time to fledging, and details of parental care are not known.

=== Vocalization ===
The spot-breasted thornbird's song is "10–25 less evenly spaced, complaining notes, 'kew, kééé-keee-keee-keee-keee-keeh…' ". Its alarm call is "a series of squeaky ticking notes".

== Status ==
The IUCN has assessed the spot-breasted thornbird as being of Least Concern. It has a fairly large range and an unknown population size that is believed to be stable. No immediate threats have been identified. It is considered fairly common to uncommon and occurs in at least one protected area.
