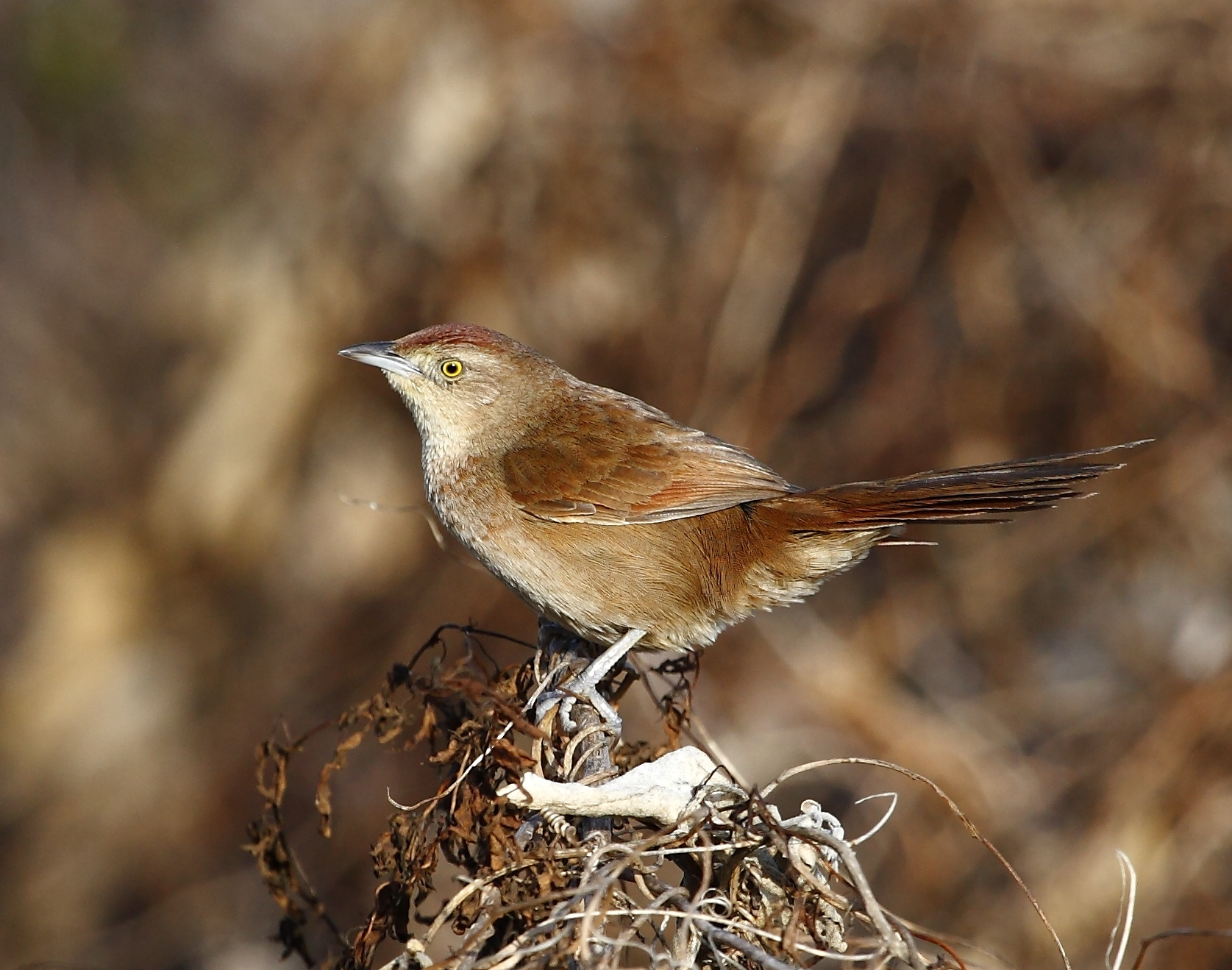

Conservation status
- Least Concern (IUCN 3.1)

Scientific classification
- Kingdom: Animalia
- Phylum: Chordata
- Class: Aves
- Order: Passeriformes
- Family: Furnariidae
- Genus: Phacellodomus
- Species: P. striaticollis

Binomial name
- Phacellodomus striaticollis (d'Orbigny & Lafresnaye, 1838)

Synonyms
- Anumbius striaticollis

= Freckle-breasted thornbird =

Species of bird

The freckle-breasted thornbird (Phacellodomus striaticollis) is a species of bird in the Furnariinae subfamily of the ovenbird family Furnariidae. It is found in Argentina, Brazil, Uruguay, and possibly Paraguay.

== Taxonomy and systematics ==
The freckle-breasted thornbird was first described by Alcide d'Orbigny and Frédéric de Lafresnaye in 1838, from Uruguay.

The freckle-breasted thornbird is monotypic. However, what is now the spot-breasted thornbird (P. maculipectus) was long considered a subspecies of it, but they are not closely related. The freckle-breasted and greater thornbird (P. ruber) are sister species.

== Description ==
The spot-breasted thornbird is 16 to 20 cm (6.3 to 7.9 in) long and weighs about 24 to 27 g (0.85 to 0.95 oz). It is a medium-sized thornbird. The sexes have the same plumage. Adults have an indistinct light brownish supercilium that extends beyond the eye and a very narrow dark brown stripe behind the eye on an otherwise light brownish face. Their crown is brownish chestnut with whitish spots, their back dull reddish brown, and their rump and uppertail coverts a slightly paler reddish brown. Their wings are mostly shades of brown with darker brown primary coverts and flight feathers with rufous edges and dusky tips. Their tail's central pair of feathers are dull rufescent brown and the rest dull rufous. Their throat is dingy whitish, their breast light brownish with pale streaks and dark rufous speckles, their belly light brownish white, and their flanks and undertail coverts dull gray-brown. Their iris is yellow to creamy buff or pale orange, their maxilla blackish to brownish, their mandible gray, and their legs and feet gray to greenish gray. Juveniles have a less rufescent back than adults.

== Distribution and habitat ==
The freckle-breasted thornbird is found in northern Argentina between the provinces of Formosa and Buenos Aires, in Brazil from Paraná state south, and in most of Uruguay. It possibly also occurs in Paraguay; the South American Classification Committee of the American Ornithological Society has only sight records from that country and so treats it as hypothetical there. The species inhabits a variety of landscapes, almost always near water. These include thickets along watercourses, gallery forest, the borders of marshes, and arid scrublands. In elevation it occurs from near sea level to 700 m (2,300 ft).

== Behavior ==
=== Movement ===
The freckle-breasted thornbird is a year-round resident throughout its range.

=== Feeding ===
The freckle-breasted thornbird feeds on a wide variety of arthropods including beetles, grasshoppers, and scale insects. It usually forages in pairs. It captures prey by gleaning from the ground or from vegetation as high as the forest's understorey.

=== Breeding ===
The freckle-breasted thornbird breeds in the austral spring and summer, roughly from August to February. It is monogamous and sometimes produces two broods in a season. It builds an oblong nest of thorny sticks that can be about 30 cm (1 ft) high and 50 cm (2 ft) long, and lines an interior chamber with soft plant material. It hangs the nest near the end a tree branch, usually 1 to 3 m (3 to 10 ft) above the ground, and often over water. The clutch size is usually three or four eggs but can be two or five. The incubation period is about 16 days and fledging occurs about 12 to 13 days after hatch. Details of parental care are not known.

=== Vocalization ===
The freckle-breasted thornbird's song "starts with one to several ascending low notes, sometimes hesitating, followed by 3–4 loud, shrill descending monotonic notes that end abruptly, 'psep, psep, psep-kleek, kleek, kleek' ". Its alarm call is "a series of squeaky ticking notes".

== Status ==
The IUCN has assessed the speckle-breasted thornbird as being of Least Concern. It has a large range and an unknown population size that is believed to be stable. No immediate threats have been identified. It is considered uncommon to fairly common and occurs in several protected areas.
