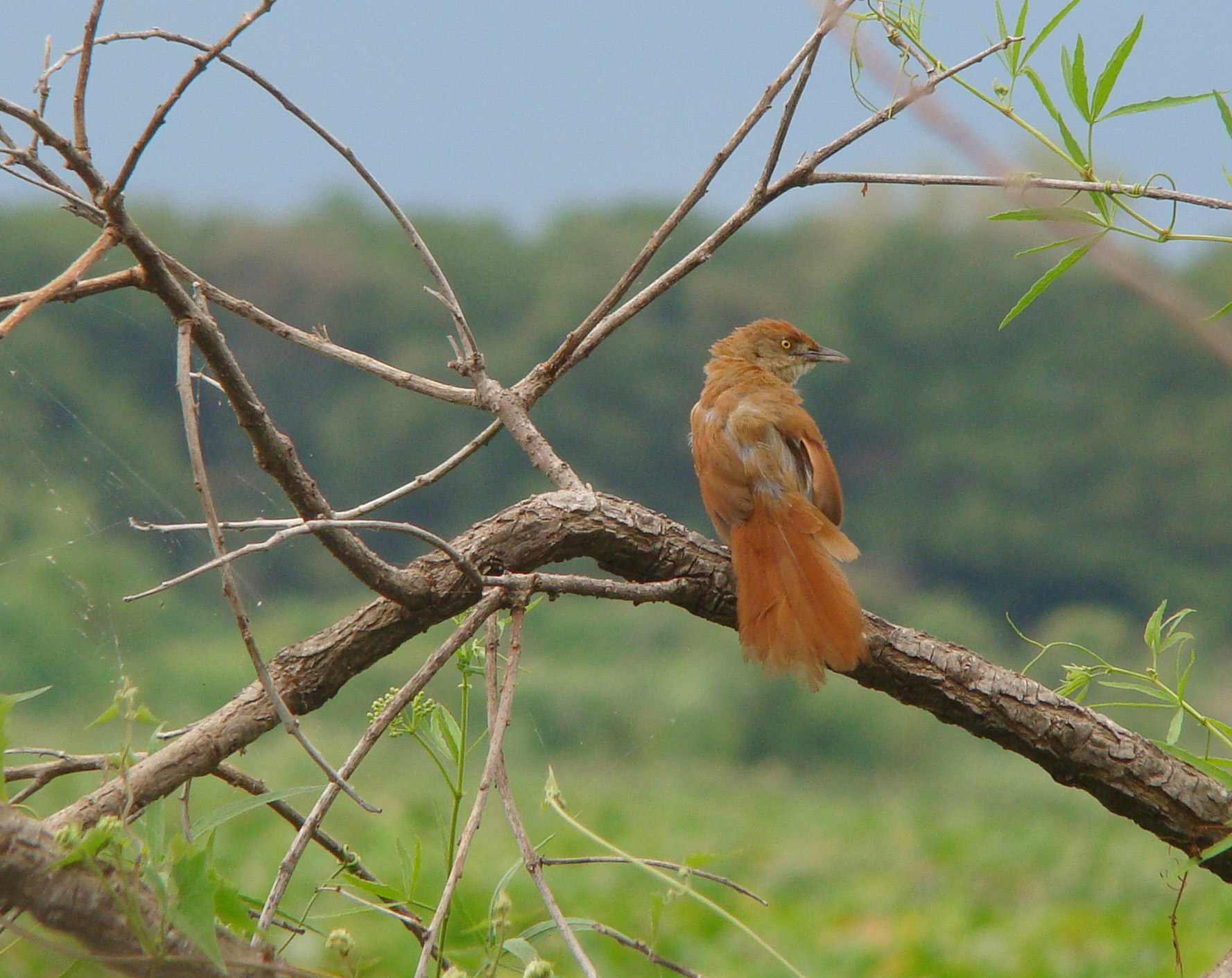

Conservation status
- Least Concern (IUCN 3.1)

Scientific classification
- Kingdom: Animalia
- Phylum: Chordata
- Class: Aves
- Order: Passeriformes
- Family: Furnariidae
- Genus: Phacellodomus
- Species: P. ruber

Binomial name
- Phacellodomus ruber (Vieillot, 1817)

= Greater thornbird =

Species of bird

The greater thornbird (Phacellodomus ruber) is a species of bird in the Furnariinae subfamily of the ovenbird family Furnariidae. It is found in Argentina, Bolivia, Brazil, Paraguay, and Uruguay.

== Taxonomy and systematics ==
The greater thornbird is monotypic. It and the freckle-breasted thornbird (P. striaticollis) are sister species.

== Description ==
The greater thornbird is 19 to 21 cm (7.5 to 8.3 in) long and weighs about 35 to 51 g (1.2 to 1.8 oz). It is heaviest and reddest thornbird. The sexes have the same plumage. Adults have a mostly rufescent brown to grayish brown face with a paler supercilium and ear coverts and a whitish malar area. Their crown is reddish chestnut with pale streaks, their back rich reddish brown to olive-brown that sometimes becomes chestnut on the lower back, their rump a lighter rufescent brown, and their uppertail coverts chestnut. Their wings are a nearly uniform rufous-chestnut and their tail reddish chestnut. Their throat is whitish, their breast pale with a light brownish tinge, their belly whitish, and their undertail coverts light rufescent brown. Their iris is light yellow to orange, their maxilla blackish to dark grayish horn, their mandible pale gray to grayish green, and their legs and feet gray to olive. Juveniles have a less defined crown patch than adults and brownish mottling on their breast.

== Distribution and habitat ==
The greater thornbird is found in north-central and eastern Bolivia, from Bolivia east in Brazil to western Pernambuco and Bahia and south into Rio Grande do Sul, through central Paraguay into northern Argentina as far as Corrientes Province, and into western Uruguay. The species inhabits a variety of landscapes, almost always near water. These include thickets along watercourses, gallery forest, the borders of marshes, and scrublands. In elevation it mostly occurs between 300 and 1,100 m (1,000 and 3,600 ft) but locally reaches 1,400 m (4,600 ft) in Bolivia.

== Behavior ==
=== Movement ===
The greater thornbird is a year-round resident throughout its range.

=== Feeding ===
The greater thornbird feeds on a wide variety of arthropods. It usually forages in pairs. It captures prey by gleaning from the ground or from vegetation as in the forest's understorey.

=== Breeding ===
The greater thornbird breeds during the austral spring and summer, roughly September to January or beyond. It makes a cone-shaped nest of thorny twigs and branches that can be about 60 cm (2 ft) high and 50 cm (2 ft) wide at its base, and lines an interior chamber with soft plant material and feathers. It hangs the nest from a tree or shrub branch, usually 1 to 3 m (3 to 10 ft) above the ground, and often over water. The usual clutch size is three to four eggs with rarely a fifth. The incubation period, time to fledging, and details of parental care are not known.

=== Vocalization ===
The greater thornbird's song is a "series of up to 20 loud, sharp, resounding notes, starting very high and explosive, thereafter slightly accelerating and gradually descending". Rendered in words it is "poo tew tew tew too too tootootoochoochew". Pairs often sing in duet. Its calls include a "loud, high 'djeub-djeb-djebdjed' " and "sharp 'check check' and 'chweet'.

== Status ==
The IUCN has assessed the greater thornbird as being of Least Concern. It has a very large range but an unknown population size that is believed to be decreasing. No immediate threats have been identified. It is considered uncommon to common and occurs in several protected areas.
