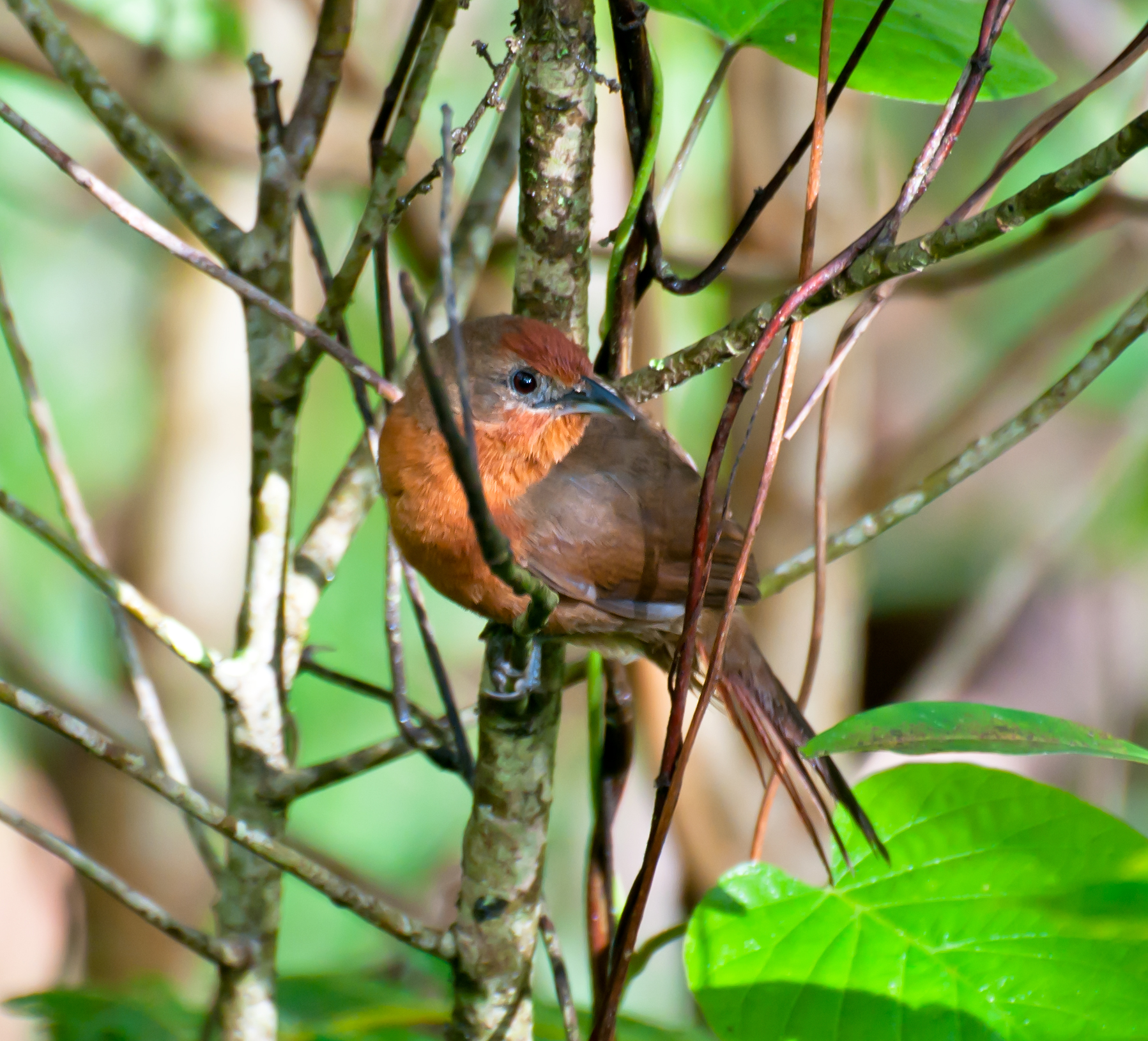
- Orange-breasted thornbird (Phacellodomus ferrugineigula)

Scientific classification
- Kingdom: Animalia
- Phylum: Chordata
- Class: Aves
- Order: Passeriformes
- Family: Furnariidae
- Genus: Phacellodomus; Reichenbach, 1853

Type species
- Anabates rufifrons Rufous-fronted thornbird Wied, 1821

Species
- See text

= Phacellodomus =

Genus of birds

Phacellodomus is the genus of thornbirds, birds in the family Furnariidae. They are found in woodlands, shrublands, and grasslands, often near water, in South America.

== Taxonomy ==
The genus Phacellodomus was described in 1853 by the German naturalist Ludwig Reichenbach to accommodate the rufous-fronted thornbird. The genus name combines the Ancient Greek phakellos meaning "bundle of twigs" and domos meaning "house".

=== Species ===
The genus contains ten species:

Image	Scientific name	Common Name	Distribution
	Phacellodomus rufifrons	Rufous-fronted thornbird	northern Peru, central and northeastern South America
	Phacellodomus inornatus	Plain thornbird	Venezuela and northeastern Colombia
	Phacellodomus striaticeps	Streak-fronted thornbird	eastern Puna grassland
	Phacellodomus sibilatrix	Little thornbird	northern Argentina, Paraguay, southeastern Bolivia and western Uruguay
	Phacellodomus dorsalis	Chestnut-backed thornbird	upper Marañón River
	Phacellodomus maculipectus	Spot-breasted thornbird	southern Andean Yungas
	Phacellodomus striaticollis	Freckle-breasted thornbird	Uruguay, northeastern Argentina and South Region
	Phacellodomus ruber	Greater thornbird	Cerrado, Bolivia, Paraguay and northern Argentina
	Phacellodomus arythrophthalmus	Orange-eyed thornbird	eastern Brazil
	Phacellodomus ferrugineigula	Orange-breasted thornbird	southeastern Brazil

Phacellodomus ferrugineigula – formerly a subspecies of P. erythrophthalmus.
