= Bar-winged cinclodes =

Three species of bird were formerly considered subspecies of the bar-winged cinclodes:

- Buff-winged cinclodes, Cinclodes fuscus
- Chestnut-winged cinclodes, Cinclodes albidiventris
- Cream-winged cinclodes, Cinclodes albiventris
