= Seaside cinclodes =

There are two species of bird named seaside cinclodes.

- Chilean seaside cinclodes, Cinclodes nigrofumosus
- Peruvian seaside cinclodes, Cinclodes taczanowskii
