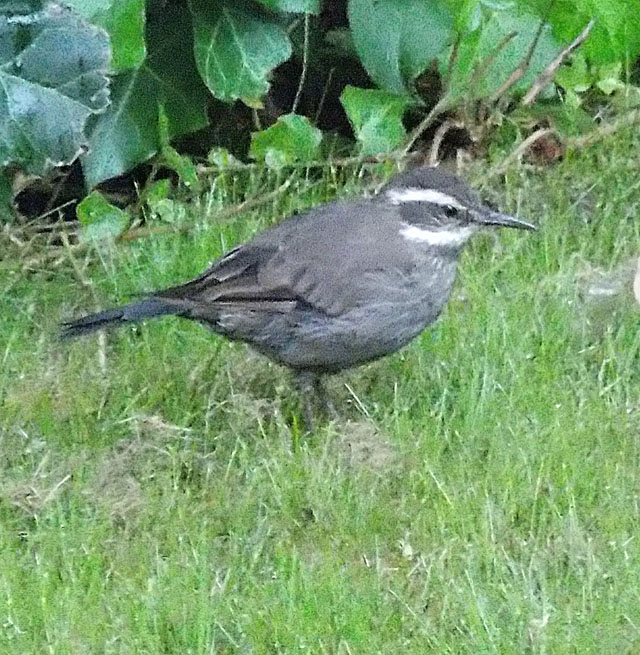

Conservation status
- Least Concern (IUCN 3.1)

Scientific classification
- Kingdom: Animalia
- Phylum: Chordata
- Class: Aves
- Order: Passeriformes
- Family: Furnariidae
- Genus: Cinclodes
- Species: C. oustaleti

Binomial name
- Cinclodes oustaleti Scott, 1900

= Grey-flanked cinclodes =

Species of bird

The grey-flanked cinclodes (Cinclodes oustaleti), formerly known as Oustalet's cinclodes, is a species of bird in the Furnariinae subfamily of the ovenbird family Furnariidae. It is found in Argentina and Chile.

== Taxonomy and systematics ==
The grey-flanked cinclodes is closely related to Olrog's cinclodes (C. olrogi). It has three subspecies, the nominate C. o. oustaleti (Scott, 1900), C. o. hornensis (Dabbene, 1917), and C. o. baeckstroemii (Lönnberg, 1921).

== Description ==
The grey-flanked cinclodes is 17 to 18 cm (6.7 to 7.1 in) long and weighs 22 to 31 g (0.78 to 1.1 oz). It is a small cinclodes with a medium-length slightly decurved bill. The sexes have the same plumage. Adults of the nominate subspecies have a buff supercilium with speckles at its front, blackish brown lores and ear coverts, and a whitish malar area with dark scallops. Their crown is dark grayish brown and their upperparts rich dark brown. Their wings are also rich dark brown, with a whitish bend, tawny-rufous and blackish brown primary coverts, and some rufous across the base of the flight feathers. Their tail is blackish brown with dull rufous tips on the outer feathers. Their throat is white with dark scallops at its base and their breast dull dark gray-brown with pale spots on its upper part that become streaks below. Their belly is paler and browner than the breast and has a white center, and their flanks and undertail coverts are rich dark brown with some whitish feather tips. Their iris is dark brown to black, their bill blackish or blackish horn, and their legs and feet blackish brown. Subspecies C. o. hornensis is less richly colored than the nominate, with darker gray upperparts and grayer (less brown) underparts. C. o. baeckstroemii is like the nominate with the addition of a rufous tinge on the sides, flanks, and undertail coverts.

== Distribution and habitat ==
The nominate subspecies of the grey-flanked cinclodes is found in mainland South America, in Chile from the Antofagasta Region and in western Argentina from Mendoza Province, in both countries south to the Strait of Magellan. Subspecies C. o. hornensis is found on Chile's Desolación Island and on Chilean and Argentine Tierra del Fuego and the Cape Horn Archipelago. C. o. baeckstroemii is found only on Alejandro Selkirk Island in Chile's Juan Fernández Archipelago.

The grey-flanked cinclodes inhabits open grassy and rocky landscapes, and in mountains is often found near streams. In elevation it ranges from sea level to 4,200 m (13,800 ft).

== Behavior ==
=== Movement ===
The grey-flanked cinclodes is mostly a year-round resident in most of its range, though with movement to lower elevations in winter. Subspecies C. o. hornensis is partially migratory, with some individuals moving north onto the mainland after the breeding season.

=== Feeding ===
The grey-flanked cinclodes feeds on arthropods and is assumed to eat other invertebrates as well. It forages singly or in pairs, gleaning prey from the ground, mud, and rocks.

=== Breeding ===
The grey-flanked cinclodes breeds in the austral spring and summer, including at least October. It is assumed to be monogamous. It nests in a burrow at the end of a tunnel it excavates in an earth bank, often a streamside one, and floors the nest chamber with plant fibers and hair. The clutch size is two eggs. The incubation period, time to fledging, and details of parental care are not known.

=== Vocalization ===
The grey-flanked cinclodes' song is "a fast dry twittery trill rising in pitch, introduced by a few single notes", and its call is "a dry 'tsick' ".

== Status ==
The IUCN has assessed the grey-flanked cinclodes as being of Least Concern. It has a large range, but its population size is unknown and is believed to be decreasing. No immediate threats have been identified. It is considered uncommon to fairly common and its habitat "is subject to only minimal human disturbance other than grazing".
