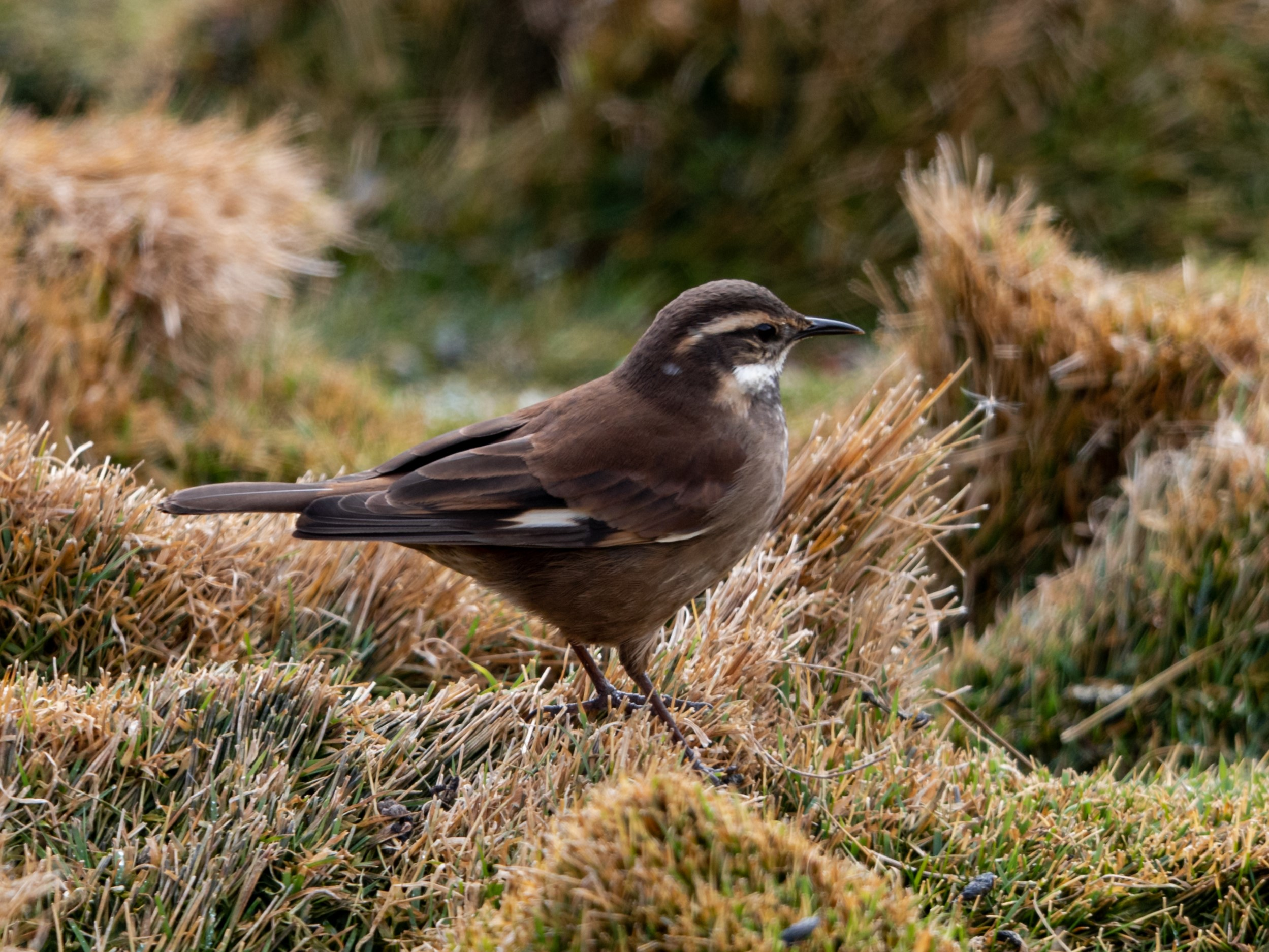

Conservation status
- Least Concern (IUCN 3.1)

Scientific classification
- Kingdom: Animalia
- Phylum: Chordata
- Class: Aves
- Order: Passeriformes
- Family: Furnariidae
- Genus: Cinclodes
- Species: C. olrogi

Binomial name
- Cinclodes olrogi Nores & Yzurieta, 1979

= Olrog's cinclodes =

Species of bird

Olrog's cinclodes (Cinclodes olrogi) is a species of bird in the Furnariinae subfamily of the ovenbird family Furnariidae. It is endemic to Argentina.

== Taxonomy and systematics ==
Olrog cinclodes' English name and specific epithet honor the Swedish-Argentine biologist Claes C. Olrog.

One of the authors who first described Olrog's cinclodes (Nores) later treated it as a subspecies of what was then called the bar-winged cinclodes (C. fuscus sensu lato). (In a three-way split of the bar-winged that began in about 2009, C. fuscus was renamed to the present buff-winged cinclodes to avoid confusion with the previous much more complex species.) The species' namesake Olrog and several other authors maintained that it was more closely related to the gray-flanked cinclodes (C. oustaleti), and this has been confirmed by genetic data.

Olrog's cinclodes is monotypic.

== Description ==
Olrog's cinclodes is about 17 cm (6.7 in) long and weighs 24 to 32 g (0.85 to 1.1 oz). It is a small cinclodes with a medium-length slightly decurved bill. The sexes have the same plumage. Adults have a white supercilium, and blackish brown lores and ear coverts. Their crown is blackish brown and their upperparts dark gray-brown with a chestnut tinge. Their wings are a darker gray-brown with a wide white band across the base of the flight feathers. Their tail is dark gray-brown with dull rufous tips on the outer feathers. Their throat and breast are white with some dark scaling on the latter. The rest of their underparts are pale dull brown.

== Distribution and habitat ==
Olrog's cinclodes is found in north-central Argentina. It occurs in the Sierras Grandes and Sierras de Comechingones of Córdoba Province and the Sierras de San Luis in adjoining San Luis Province. It inhabits open grassy landscapes, many of them rocky, and it usually is found near streams and lakes. In elevation it ranges between 1,600 and 2,800 m (5,200 and 9,200 ft).

== Behavior ==
=== Movement ===
Olrog's cinclodes is mostly a year-round resident throughout its range, though some individuals move to lower elevations after the breeding season.

=== Feeding ===
Olrog's cinclodes feeds on arthropods and is assumed to eat other invertebrates as well. It forages singly or in pairs, gleaning prey from the ground, mud, and rocks.

=== Breeding ===
Olrog's cinclodes breeds in the austral spring and summer, including at least November and December. It is assumed to be monogamous. It nests in a burrow at the end of a tunnel it excavates in an earth bank, in a crevice among rocks, or in a human structure's wall. It floors the nest chamber with plant fibers and hair. The clutch size is two eggs. The incubation period, time to fledging, and details of parental care are not known.

=== Vocalization ===
The song of Olrog's cinclodes and its vocal behavior have not been described.

== Status ==
The IUCN has assessed Olrog's cinclodes as being of Least Concern. It has a restricted range and an unknown population size that is believed to be decreasing, but none of these meet the criteria for uplisting to Near Threatened. No immediate threats have been identified. It is considered common within that small range, where it is "relatively free from human disturbance; grazing appears to be the only potential problem".
