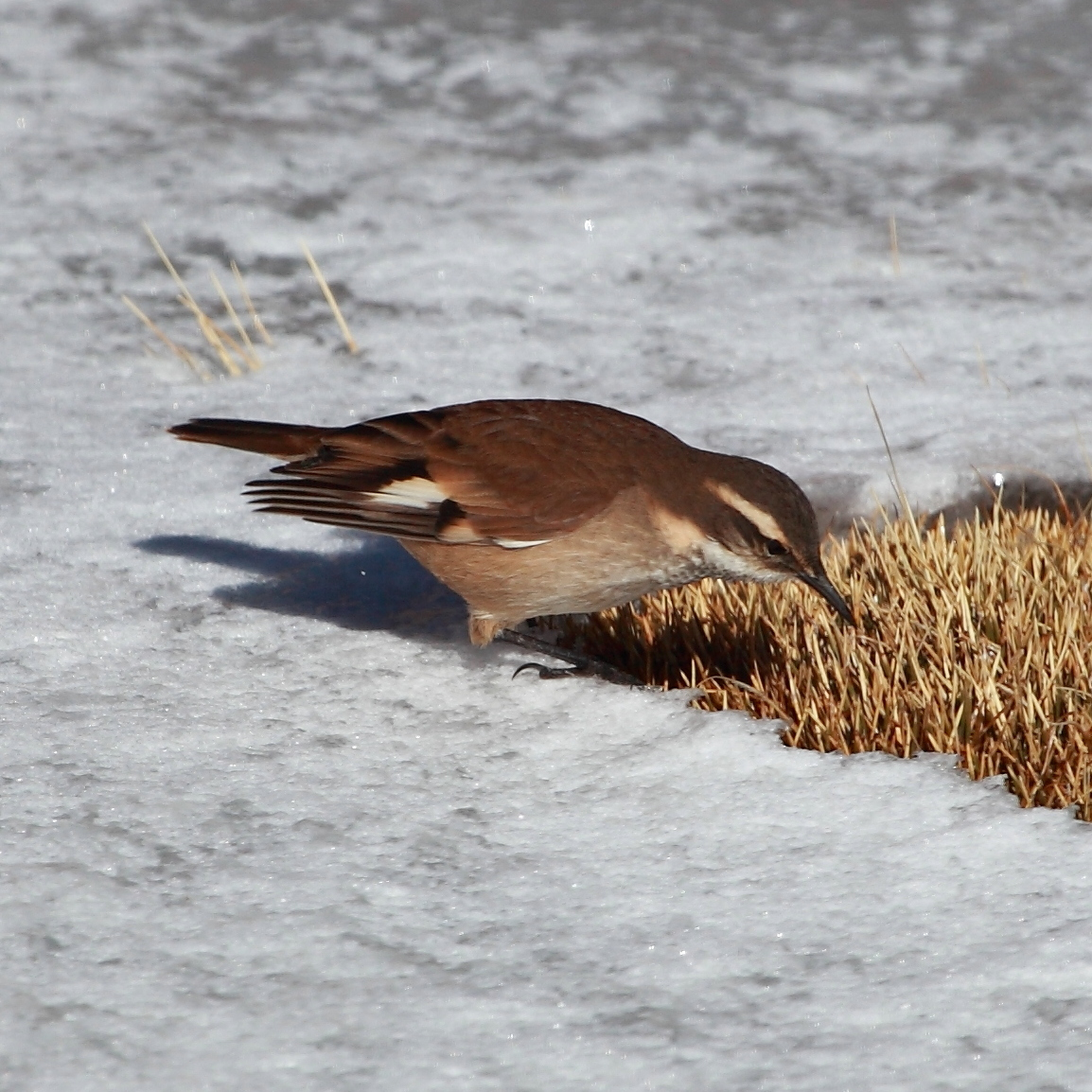
- White-winged cinclodes at San Pedro de Atacama, Antofagasta Region, Chile

Conservation status
- Least Concern (IUCN 3.1)

Scientific classification
- Kingdom: Animalia
- Phylum: Chordata
- Class: Aves
- Order: Passeriformes
- Family: Furnariidae
- Genus: Cinclodes
- Species: C. atacamensis

Binomial name
- Cinclodes atacamensis (Philippi, 1857)

= White-winged cinclodes =

Species of bird

The white-winged cinclodes (Cinclodes atacamensis) is a species of bird in the Furnariinae subfamily of the ovenbird family Furnariidae. It is found in Argentina, Bolivia, Chile, and Peru.

== Taxonomy and systematics ==
The white-winged cinclodes has two subspecies, the nominate C. a. atacamensis (Philippi, 1857) and C. a. schocolatinus (Reichenow, 1920). Some authors have suggested that it and the white-bellied cinclodes (C. palliatus) are sister species, but genetic tests were inconclusive.

== Description ==
The white-winged cinclodes is 19 to 20 cm (7.5 to 7.9 in) long and weighs 45 to 56 g (1.6 to 2.0 oz). It is a fairly large cinclodes with a decurved bill. The sexes have the same plumage. Adults of the nominate subspecies have a whitish supercilium, brownish gray lores, grayish brown ear coverts with reddish tones, and a whitish malar area with some faint darker flecks. Their crown is grayish brown and their upperparts rich reddish brown. Their wing coverts are reddish brown. Their wings have white at the bend and blackish flight feathers with white across their base forming a conspicuous band. Their tail's central feathers are dark fuscous brown with paler shafts and the rest are blackish brown with increasingly large white spots from the inner to the outer feathers. Their throat is whitish with faint darked specks, their breast and sides buffy grayish, their belly brownish gray, their flanks rich brown, and their undertail coverts mottled brown and grayish white. Their upper breast has faint pale streaks and flecks that almost disappear on the lower breast. Their iris is dark brown, their bill blackish to dark horn, and their legs and feet dusky brown. Juveniles are like adults with pale edges on the feathers of their lower back and less distinct breast markings. Subspecies C. a. schocolatinus has darker brown upperparts and grayer underparts than the nominate, with dark brown sides and flanks.

== Distribution and habitat ==
The nominate subspecies of the white-winged cinclodes is found from central Peru's Department of Ancash south through western Bolivia to Chile's Santiago Metropolitan Region and northwest Argentina's Mendoza Province. Subspecies C. a. schocolatinus is found in west-central Argentina's Córdoba and San Luis provinces. The species inhabits puna grasslands and slopes with rocks or shrubs. It almost always is along flowing streams and rivers. In elevation it mostly ranges between 2,800 and 4,500 m (9,200 and 14,800 ft) but locally occurs as low as 2,200 m (7,200 ft).

== Behavior ==
=== Movement ===
The white-winged cinclodes is mostly a year-round resident, though some members of subspecies C. a. schocolatinus and the southernmost population of the nominate move to lower elevations after breeding.

=== Feeding ===
The white-winged cinclodes' diet has not been fully documented but is known to include larval and adult insects, spiders, and snails. It usually forages singly or in pairs, gleaning its prey from the ground and mud along the edges of watercourses.

=== Breeding ===
The white-winged cinclodes is thought to breed during the austral spring and summer; its season includes at least October to December. It is thought to be monogamous. It nests in a chamber at the end of tunnel it excavates in an earthen bank, in a rock crevice, or in the wall of a human structure. It pads the chamber bottom with dry grass and hair. The clutch size is two eggs. The incubation period, time to fledging, and details of parental care are not known.

=== Vocalization ===
The white-winged cinclodes' song is a trill and its call "a loud, whistled 'wheet' ".

== Status ==
The IUCN has assessed the white-winged cinclodes as being of Least Concern. It has a very large range, but its population size is not known and is believed to be decreasing. No immediate threats have been identified. It is considered uncommon to fairly common. Its habitat and "altitudinal range render it relatively insulated against human disturbance other than overgrazing".
