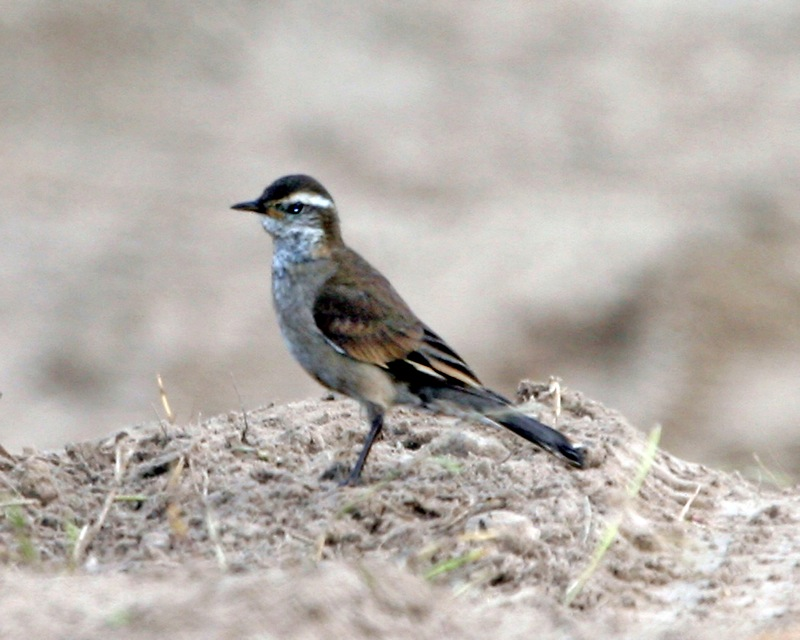
- Buff-winged cinclodes (C. fuscus) in Argentina

Scientific classification
- Kingdom: Animalia
- Phylum: Chordata
- Class: Aves
- Order: Passeriformes
- Family: Furnariidae
- Genus: Cinclodes; G.R. Gray, 1840

Type species
- Motacilla patagonica Gmelin, 1789

Species
- See list

= Cinclodes =

Genus of birds

Cinclodes is a genus of passerine birds belonging to the ovenbird family Furnariidae. There are about a dozen species distributed across the southern and Andean regions of South America. They are terrestrial birds of open habitats, typically found near water such as mountain streams or the seashore where they forage for small invertebrates. They are stocky birds with strong legs and feet and pointed, slightly downcurved bills. The plumage is inconspicuous and mainly brown, often with a pale wingbar, stripe over the eye and corners to the tail. They have loud, trilling songs and often raise their wings while singing.

== Taxonomy ==
The genus Cinclodes was introduced in 1840 by the English zoologist George Robert Gray. The name combines the Ancient Greek kinklos, a word for an unknown waterside bird, with -oidēs meaning "resembling". In 1855 Gray specified the type species as the dark-bellied cinclodes, a species that had been described in 1889 by Gmelin under the binomial name Motacilla patagonica.

The genus contains 15 extant species:

Image	Common name	Scientific name	Distribution
	Long-tailed cinclodes	Cinclodes pabsti	southern Atlantic Forest and Espinhaço Mountains
	Blackish cinclodes	Cinclodes antarcticus	Falkland Islands and Tierra del Fuego
	Buff-winged cinclodes	Cinclodes fuscus	southern Cone
	Cordoba cinclodes	Cinclodes comechingonus	Sierras de Córdoba
	Chestnut-winged cinclodes	Cinclodes albidiventris	northern Andes
	Cream-winged cinclodes	Cinclodes albiventris	puna grassland
	Olrog's cinclodes	Cinclodes olrogi	Sierras de Córdoba
	Grey-flanked cinclodes	Cinclodes oustaleti	Chile
	Stout-billed cinclodes	Cinclodes excelsior	northern Andes
	Royal cinclodes	Cinclodes aricomae	southern Peru and western Bolivia
	White-bellied cinclodes	Cinclodes palliatus	central Peru
	White-winged cinclodes	Cinclodes atacamensis	puna grassland and Sierras de Córdoba
	Dark-bellied cinclodes	Cinclodes patagonicus	Chile
	Peruvian seaside cinclodes	Cinclodes taczanowskii	coastal Peru
	Chilean seaside cinclodes	Cinclodes nigrofumosus	coastal Chile

In addition, a fossil species, Cinclodes major, has been described for the Pleistocene from Argentina.
