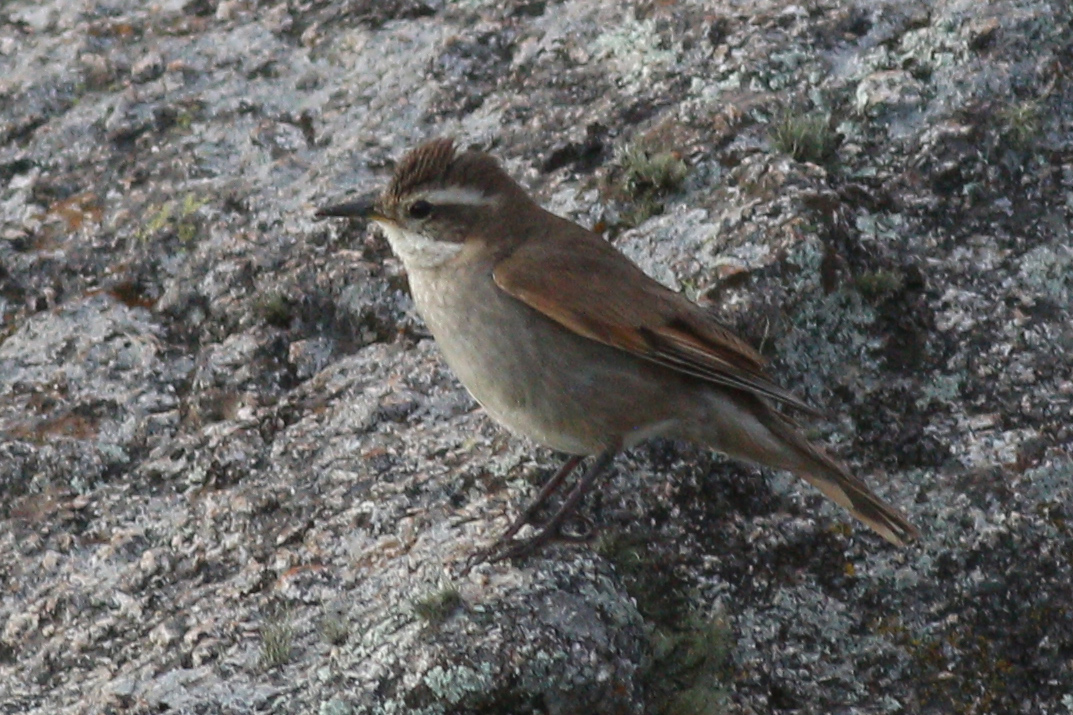

Conservation status
- Least Concern (IUCN 3.1)

Scientific classification
- Kingdom: Animalia
- Phylum: Chordata
- Class: Aves
- Order: Passeriformes
- Family: Furnariidae
- Genus: Cinclodes
- Species: C. comechingonus

Binomial name
- Cinclodes comechingonus Zotta & Gavio, 1945

= Córdoba cinclodes =

Species of bird

The Cordoba cinclodes or Comechingones cinclodes (Cinclodes comechingonus) is a species of bird in the Furnariinae subfamily of the ovenbird family Furnariidae. It is endemic to Argentina. (Major taxonomic systems spell the species' English name "Cordoba" rather than "Córdoba" so this article does so as well.)

== Taxonomy and systematics ==
The Cordoba cinclodes was treated by several mid- to later twentieth century authors as a subspecies of what was then the bar-winged cinclodes (C. fuscus sensu lato) before it was split into several species. Data available since 2000 have confirmed that it is a species in its own right and not closely related to any of the bar-winged cinclodes' "daughters".

The Cordoba cinclodes is monotypic.

== Description ==
The Cordoba cinclodes is about 17 cm (6.7 in) long and weighs 25 to 32 g (0.88 to 1.1 oz). The sexes have the same plumage. Adults have a buff-white supercilium and a dark gray-brown band from the lores through the ear coverts. Their crown and upperparts are gray-brown. Their wings are gray-brown with a wide black-edged rufous band at the base of the flight feathers. (The band is the largest and brightest of all the cinclodes'.) Their tail is dark gray except the outer pair of feathers, which are blackish with pale rufous tips. Their throat and breast are white with dark scallops, their flanks light brown, and their belly and undertail coverts pale buff-white. Their iris is brown, their bill black with a yellow base on the mandible, and their legs and feet black.

== Distribution and habitat ==
The Cordoba cinclodes is found in the Comechingónes Mountains of north-central Argentina from Córdoba Province north to Tucumán and Santiago del Estero provinces. It inhabits open grassy areas that are often rocky, and it associates with water less than other cinclodes. In elevation it mostly ranges between 1,600 and 2,800 m (5,200 and 9,200 ft) but has been observed as high as 3,300 m (10,800 ft) near Aconcagua.

== Behavior ==
=== Movement ===
The Cordoba cinclodes is a partial migrant. It breeds as far north as Mendoza Province; after the breeding season some move north of there and others move to lower elevations.

=== Feeding ===
The Cordoba cinclodes has been documented feeding on a variety of insects, other small invertebrates like snails and molluscs, and seeds. It usually forages in pairs, gleaning its food from the ground, grass, and rocks.

=== Breeding ===
The Cordoba cinclodes breeds during the austral spring and summer. It is monogamous and believed to maintain pairs year-round. It nests in a chamber at the end of a tunnel that it excavates in an earth bank or also in a rock crevice. It floors the chamber with grass, hair, and leaves. The clutch size is two eggs. The incubation period, time to fledging, and details of parental care are not known.

=== Vocalization ===
The Cordoba cinclodes' song has not been thoroughly studied but it is known to be a somewhat complex trill.

== Status ==
The IUCN has assessed the Cordoba cinclodes as being of Least Concern. It has a restricted range and an unknown population size that is believed to be decreasing, but none of these meet the criteria for uplisting to Near Threatened. No immediate threats have been identified. It is considered common within that limited range and its habitat "is relatively free from human disturbances other than grazing".
