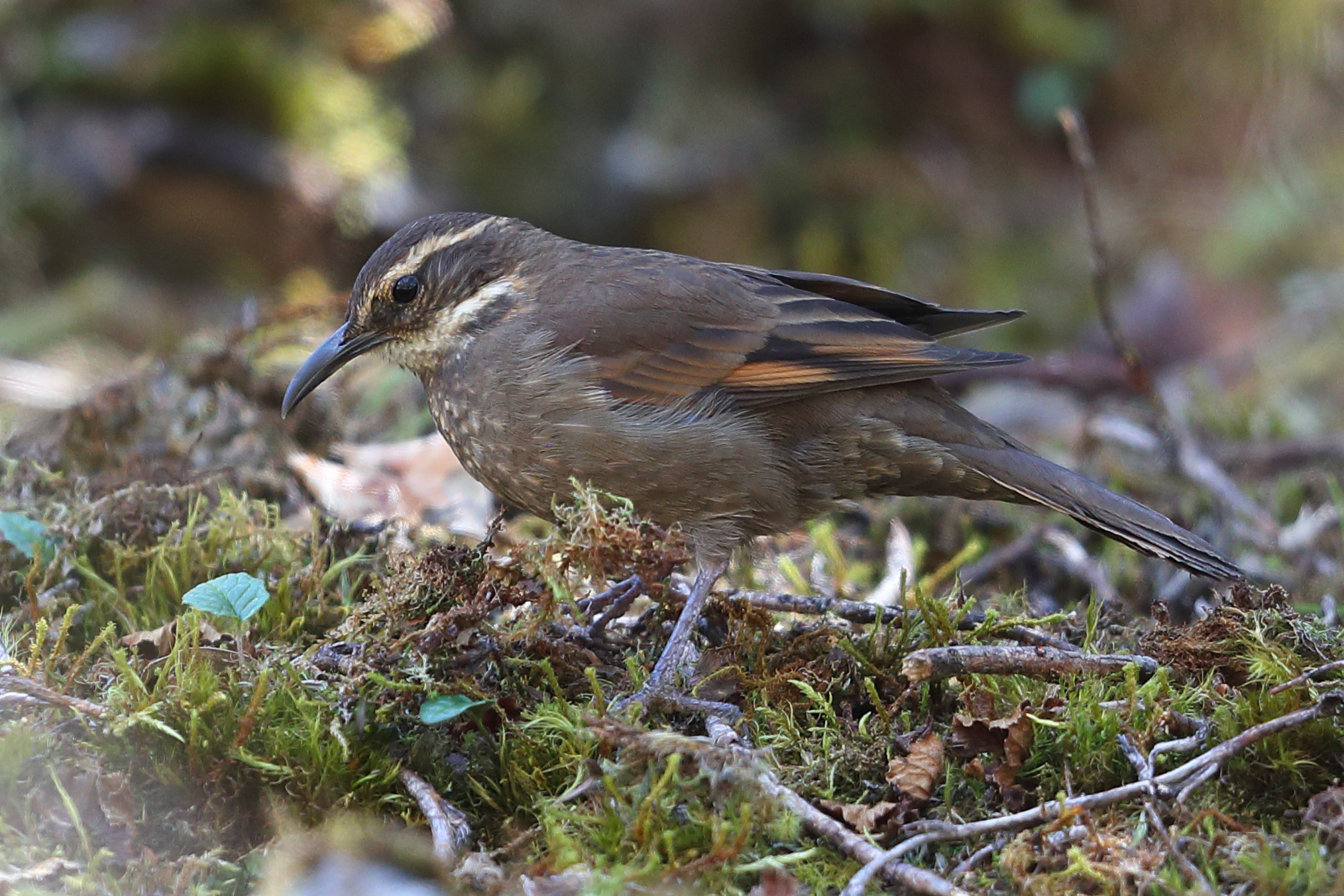

Conservation status
- Endangered (IUCN 3.1)

Scientific classification
- Kingdom: Animalia
- Phylum: Chordata
- Class: Aves
- Order: Passeriformes
- Family: Furnariidae
- Genus: Cinclodes
- Species: C. aricomae

Binomial name
- Cinclodes aricomae (Carriker, 1932)

= Royal cinclodes =

Species of bird

The royal cinclodes (Cinclodes aricomae) is an Endangered passerine bird in the Furnariinae subfamily of the ovenbird family Furnariidae. It is found in Bolivia and Peru.

== Taxonomy and systematics ==
Several authors have treated the royal and stout-billed cinclodes (C. excelsior) as conspecific. The South American Classification Committee of the American Ornithological Society considers the evidence to be weak but is seeking a proposal for that treatment's acceptance. The royal cinclodes is monotypic.

== Description ==
The royal cinclodes is 20 to 21 cm (7.9 to 8.3 in) long and weighs about 50 g (1.8 oz). It is a large cinclodes with a decurved, thick-based, bill. The sexes have the same plumage. Adults have a pale buffish supercilium that extends to the nape, a whitish malar area with thin dark bars, and an otherwise dark brown face. Their crown and upperparts are dark brown. Their wings are also dark brown, with black-edged rufous across the base of the flight feathers. Their tail is blackish. Their throat is whitish with thin dark bars and their underparts are dark brown with wide white streaks on the breast. Their iris is dark brown to brown, their bill black, and their legs and feet dark pinkish gray to black.

== Distribution and habitat ==
The royal cinclodes is found very locally from south-central Peru's Department of Junín through the departments of Apurímac, Cuzco, and Puno into Bolivia's La Paz Department. It inhabits humid Polylepis-Gynoxys woodlands, where it favors boggy areas at the base of steep rocky slopes. In elevation it ranges from 3,500 to 4,600 m (11,500 to 15,100 ft).

== Behavior ==
=== Movement ===
The royal cinclodes is a year-round resident throughout its range.

=== Feeding ===
The royal cinclodes mostly feeds on invertebrates but also occasionally includes seeds and small vertebrates like frogs in its diet. It forages singly or in pairs, probing and digging for prey in among mossy rocks, in decaying wood, and in boggy areas. It occasionally also gleans its prey from surfaces.

=== Breeding ===
The royal cinclodes' breeding season is thought to begin in December. One known nest was in a cavity behind a cleft in a cliff; it contained two nestlings that were fed by both parents. Nothing else is known about its breeding biology.

=== Vocalization ===
The royal cinclodes' song is "a very loud trill".

== Status ==
The IUCN originally assessed the royal cinclodes in 1988 as Threatened, and from 1994 – 2025 as Critically Endangered. It is currently considered to be Endangered. It has a very small and fragmented range and an estimated population of between 200 – 500 mature individuals that is believed to be decreasing. It is primarily threatened by habitat degradation caused by deforestation and overgrazing associated with agriculture. It occurs in three nominally protected areas that nevertheless "are vulnerable to grazing and burning". Climate change may also pose a threat.
