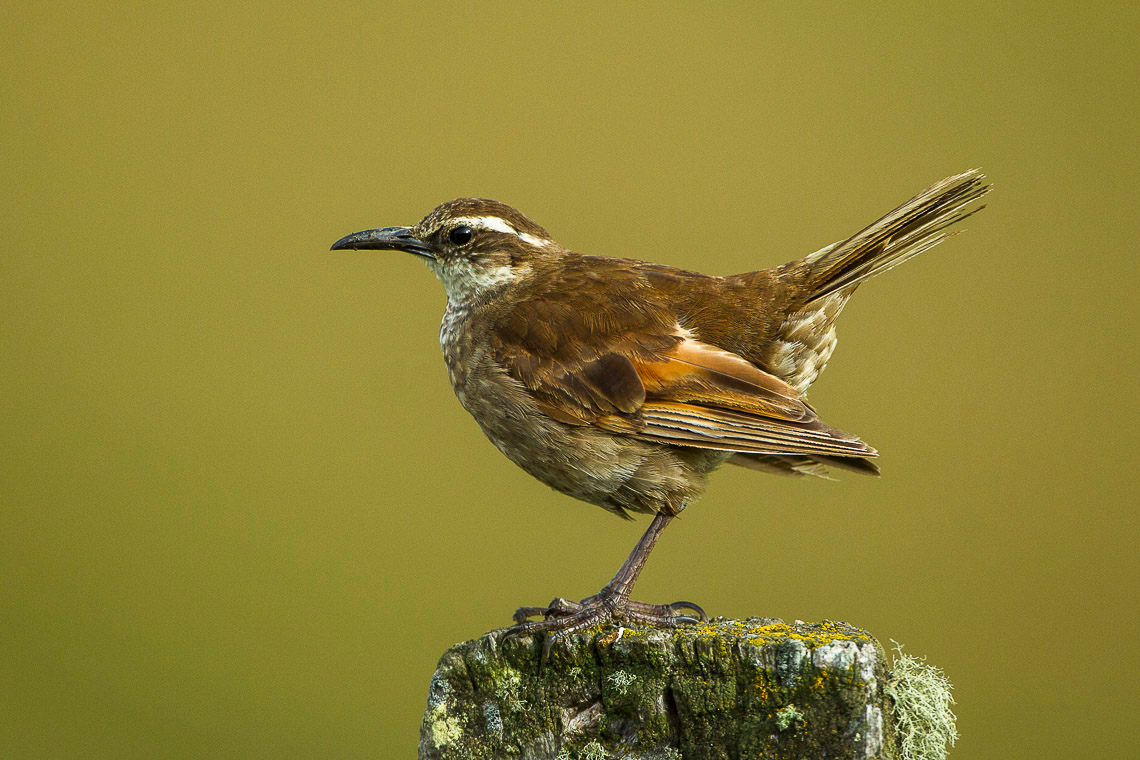

Conservation status
- Least Concern (IUCN 3.1)

Scientific classification
- Kingdom: Animalia
- Phylum: Chordata
- Class: Aves
- Order: Passeriformes
- Family: Furnariidae
- Genus: Cinclodes
- Species: C. excelsior

Binomial name
- Cinclodes excelsior Sclater, PL, 1860

Audio
- Call recorded in Ecuador

= Stout-billed cinclodes =

Species of bird

The stout-billed cinclodes (Cinclodes excelsior) is a species of bird in the Furnariinae subfamily of the ovenbird family Furnariidae. It is found in Colombia and Ecuador.

== Taxonomy and systematics ==
Various authors have placed the stout-billed cinclodes in genera Upucerthia or Geositta but these treatments have not been adopted by major taxonomic systems. Several authors have treated the stout-billed and royal cinclodes (C. aricomae) as conspecific. The South American Classification Committee of the American Ornithological Society considers the evidence to be weak but is seeking a proposal for that treatment's acceptance.

The stout-billed cinclodes has two subspecies, the nominate C. e. excelsior (Sclater, PL, 1860) and C. e. columbianus (Chapman, 1912).

== Description ==
The stout-billed cinclodes is 20 to 21 cm (7.9 to 8.3 in) long and weighs 62 to 66 g (2.2 to 2.3 oz). It is a large cinclodes with a decurved, thick-based, bill. The sexes have the same plumage. Adults of the nominate subspecies have a long white supercilium that extends to the hindneck, a whitish malar area with dark scallops, and an otherwise dark brown face with some narrow pale streaks. Their crown is very dark brown and their upperparts dark brown. Their wings are also dark brown, with blackish brown primary coverts and some rufous across the base of the flight feathers. Their tail is dark brown with increasing amounts of dull rufous from the inner to the outer feathers. Their throat is whitish with faint scallops, their upper breast light brown with indistinct paler scallops, and their lower breast and undertail coverts brownish with faint paler streaks. Their belly is pale grayish brown and their flanks brown with pale streaks. Their iris is brown to dark brown, their bill black, and their legs and feet brownish gray to blackish. Juveniles are like adults with more mottling on the breast. Subspecies C. e. columbianus has slightly darker upperparts, paler underparts, and a more distinct rufous wingband than the nominate.

== Distribution and habitat ==
The stout-billed cinclodes has a disjunct distribution. Subspecies C. e. columbianus is the more northerly of the two, found in Tolima Department in Colombia's Central Andes. The nominate subspecies is found in the Andes from Nariño Department in extreme southwestern Colombia south through Ecuador as far as Azuay Province. The species inhabits a variety of landscapes including rocky páramo grasslands, semi-humid to humid montane scrublands, and sometimes groves of Polylepis and more barren areas with scattered shubs. It favors areas near water and boggy meadows. In elevation it mostly occurs between 3,200 and 4,500 m (10,500 and 14,800 ft) but can reach snowline as high as 5,200 m (17,100 ft).

== Behavior ==
=== Movement ===
The stout-billed cinclodes is a year-round resident throughout its range.

=== Feeding ===
The stout-billed cinclodes mostly feeds in invertebrates but also includes seeds and small vertebrates like frogs in its diet. It forages singly or in pairs, probing and digging for prey in moist soil, mud, and debris; it occasionally will glean from low vegetation.

=== Breeding ===
The stout-billed cinclodes breeds in the austral summer, including at least November and December. The species is thought to be monogamous. Males sing and make a wing-flapping display from a perch. The species nests at the end of tunnel it excavates in an earth bank (especially somewhat friable pumice soils) and makes a pad of vegetable matter there. The clutch size is thought to be two eggs. The incubation period, time to fledging, and details of parental care are not known.

=== Vocalization ===
The stout-billed cinclodes' song is "a rising and swelling trill, 'tr-r-r-r-r-r-r-reet' ". Its calls include "a nasal 'kiu' or 'druut' or 'ken-eek' [and] low twittering notes in flight".

== Status ==
The IUCN has assessed the stout-billed cinclodes as being of Least Concern. It has a somewhat restricted range and an unknown population size, but the latter is believed to be stable. No immediate threats have been identified. It is considered uncommon to locally common and occurs in at least two protected areas in Ecuador.
