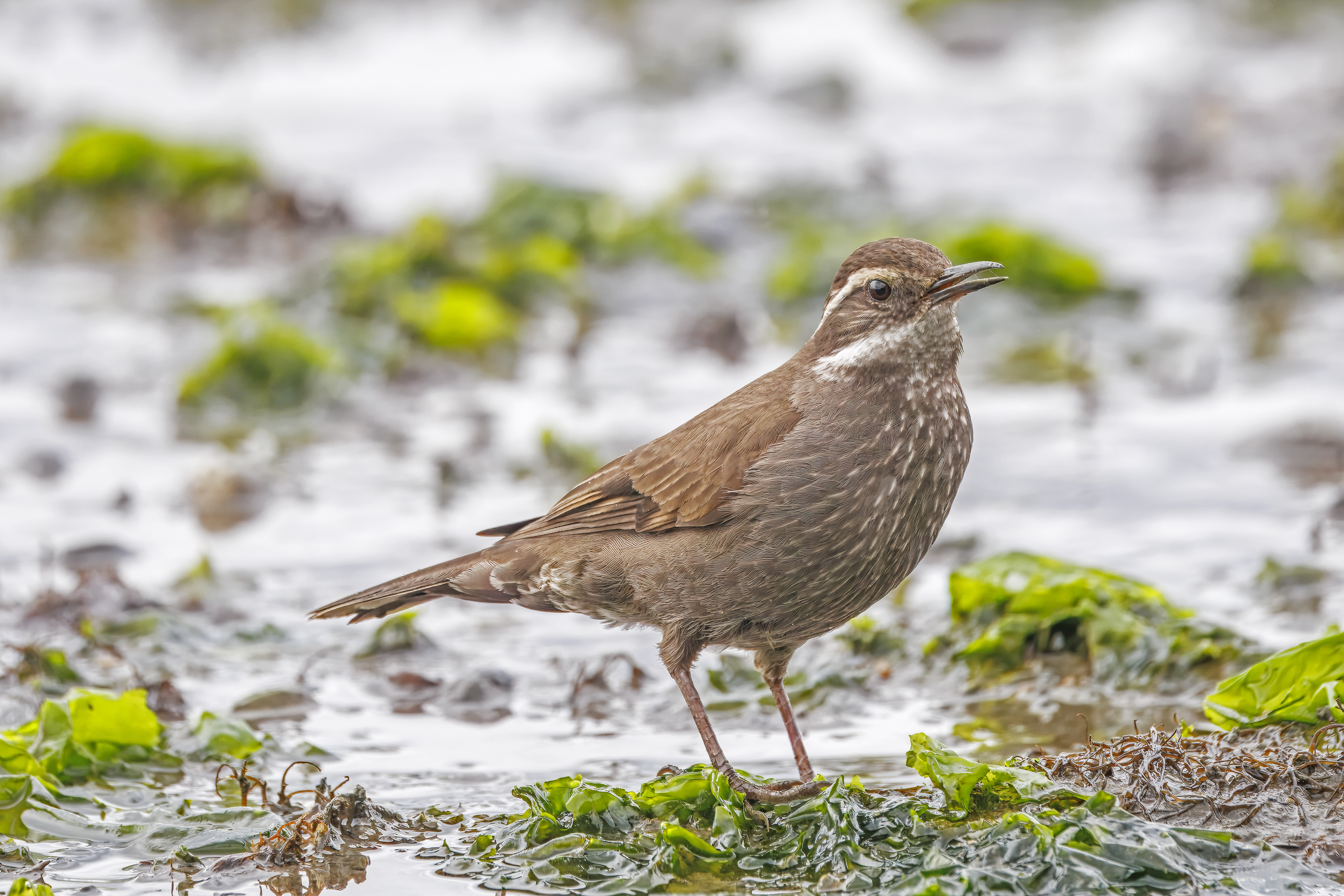
- on Chiloé Island, Chile

Conservation status
- Least Concern (IUCN 3.1)

Scientific classification
- Kingdom: Animalia
- Phylum: Chordata
- Class: Aves
- Order: Passeriformes
- Family: Furnariidae
- Genus: Cinclodes
- Species: C. patagonicus

Binomial name
- Cinclodes patagonicus (Gmelin, JF, 1789)

= Dark-bellied cinclodes =

Species of bird

The dark-bellied cinclodes (Cinclodes patagonicus) is a species of bird in the Furnariinae subfamily of the ovenbird family Furnariidae. It is found in Argentina and Chile.

== Taxonomy and systematics ==
The dark-bellied cinclodes was formally described in 1789 by the German naturalist Johann Friedrich Gmelin in his revised and expanded edition of Carl Linnaeus's Systema Naturae. He placed it with the wagtails in the genus Motacilla and coined the binomial name Motacilla patagonica. Gmelin based his description on the "Patagonian warbler" that had been described in 1783 by the English ornithologist John Latham in his book A General Synopsis of Birds. Latham had examined specimens in the Leverian Museum in London. The dark-bellied cinclodes is now one of 15 species placed in the genus Cinclodes that was introduced in 1840 by George Robert Gray.

Genetic data show that the dark-bellied cinclodes, Peruvian seaside cinclodes (C. taczanowskii), and the Chilean seaside cinclodes (C. nigrofumosus) are sister species.

Two subspecies of the dark-bellied cinclodes are recognised, the nominate C. p. patagonicus (Gmelin, JF, 1789) and C. p. chilensis (Lesson, RP, 1828).

== Description ==
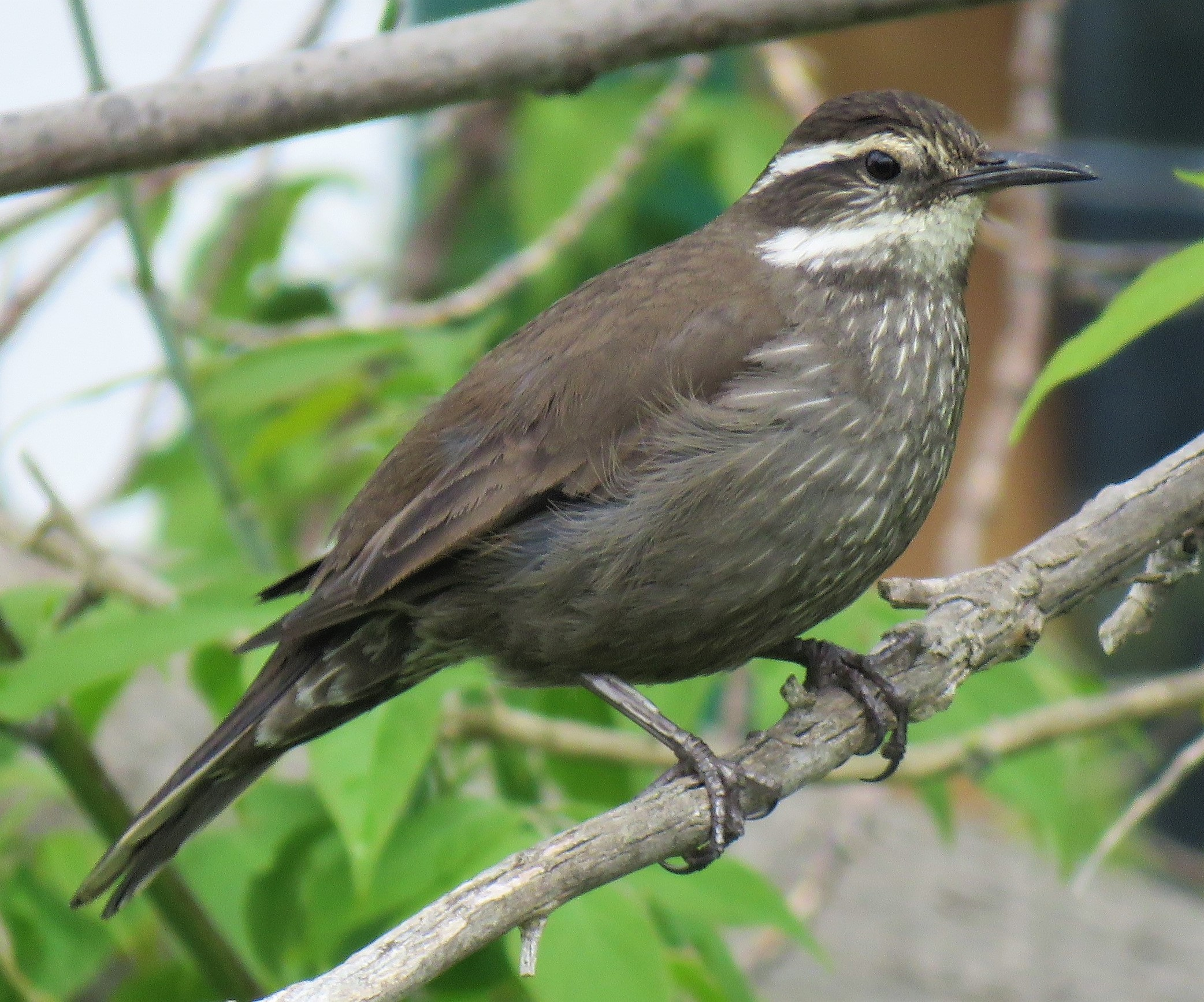

The dark-bellied cinclodes is 18 to 20 cm (7.1 to 7.9 in) long and weighs about 36 to 50 g (1.3 to 1.8 oz). It is a largish cinclodes with a long decurved bill. The sexes have the same plumages, and the two subspecies differ very little. Adults of the nominate subspecies have a white supercilium that begins at the forehead, dark brown lores and ear coverts, and a white malar area with some faint darker flecks. Their crown and nape are dark brown and their upperparts a slightly lighter brown. Their wings are dark brown with blackish brown primary coverts. Their primary coverts and flight feathers each have a thin pale rufous-tinged white band. Their tail is dark brown; the outer three pairs of feathers have progressively more tawny-whitish on their tips. Their throat is whitish with faint darker specks and their underparts mostly dull dark brown. Their upper breast has pale spots that become streaks through the lower breast onto the upper belly. Their undertail coverts are dark brown with whitish tips. Their iris is dark brown, their bill brown to blackish, and their legs and feet brown to blackish. Juveniles are like adults with pale edges on the feathers of their back and less distinct breast markings. Subspecies C. p. chilensis is slightly smaller than the nominate, with buffier tips on the outer tail feathers and slightly browner underparts with less streaking on the belly.

== Distribution and habitat ==
The dark-bellied cinclodes is native to the southern cone of South America. Subspecies C. p. chilensis is the more northerly. It is found in south-central Chile between the Atacama and Aysén regions and in adjacent western Argentina between Mendoza Province and Santa Cruz Province. The nominate subspecies is found south to Tierra del Fuego from Aysén in Chile and Santa Cruz in Argentina. The species inhabits a variety of landscapes, all of which are associated with water. These include rocky coastal beaches, lakesides, river and stream banks, and the edges of wet forest. Even in semi-arid areas it stays near water. In the northern part of its range it mostly occurs inland but in the south it is found at sea level. In the Andes it reaches elevations of about 3,500 m (11,500 ft).

== Behavior ==
=== Movement ===
The dark-bellied cinclodes appears to be resident in most of its range, but its pattern of movement is not well known. Some populations appear to move up and down slope between the seasons and some of those in the far south appear to move north and south.

=== Feeding ===
The dark-bellied cinclodes feeds on marine and terrestrial invertebrates, and always near water. It usually forages singly or in pairs, gleaning prey from the ground, rocks, debris on beaches, and the water's edge.

=== Breeding ===
The dark-bellied cinclodes' breeding season is the local austral spring and summer. It varies latitudinally, starting in October in the far south and as early as August in the north. Males make a courtship display from a perch by flapping both wings, shaking the tail up and down, and singing. The nest is built in a chamber in such places as a rock crevice, a stone wall, a burrow (self-dug or preexisting), a tree hole, or on a ledge of a human structure. The nest is a cup made of grass and feathers. The clutch size is two to four eggs. The incubation period, time to fledging, and details of parental care are not known.

=== Vocalization ===
The dark-bellied cinclodes is very vocal during the breeding season. Its song is "a piercing weep weep weep tirrrrRRRrr", sung during the male's display and sometimes in a duet by the pair. Its call is a "short, sharp, and stuttering disyllabic ch'tp lasting from 2 to several (>15) notes".

== Status ==
The IUCN has assessed the dark-bellied cinclodes as being of Least Concern. It has a large range, and though its population size is not known it is believed to be stable. No immediate threats have been identified. It is considered fairly common throughout its range and occurs in several protected areas. It "[f]requently occurs in human modified landscapes, and will even nest in human structures, but human activities that result in disturbing, modifying, or destroying wetlands and intertidal or river-side habitats could cause displacement of individuals and/or inhibit reproduction".
