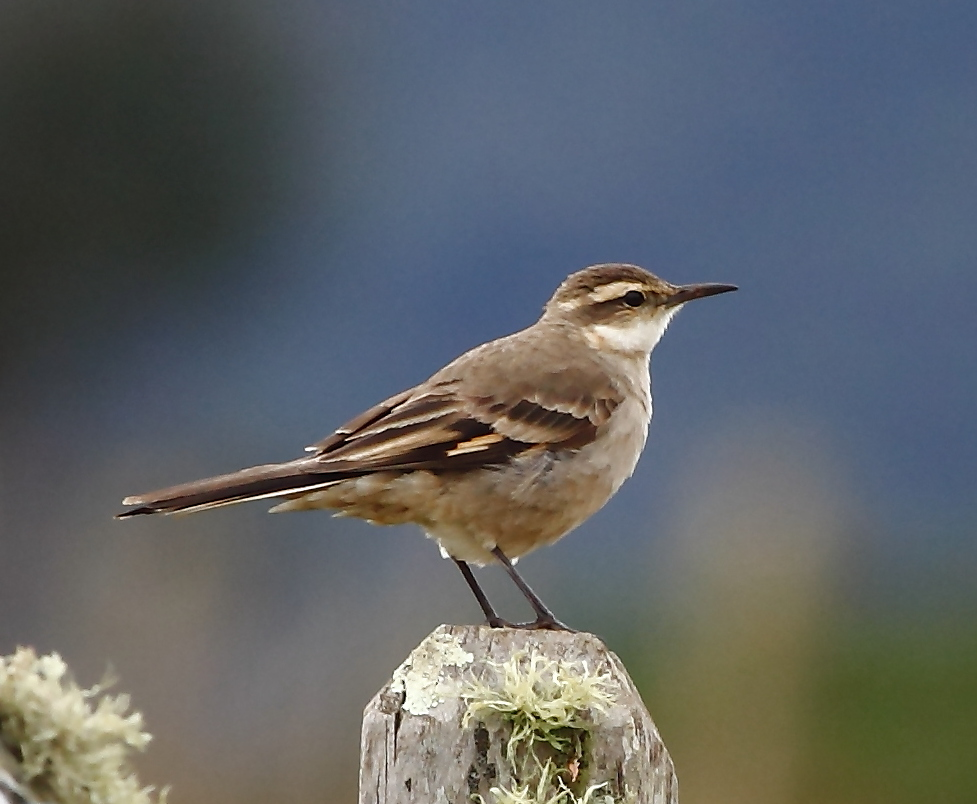
- at Urupema, Santa Catarina state, Brazil

Conservation status
- Near Threatened (IUCN 3.1)

Scientific classification
- Kingdom: Animalia
- Phylum: Chordata
- Class: Aves
- Order: Passeriformes
- Family: Furnariidae
- Genus: Cinclodes
- Species: C. pabsti

Binomial name
- Cinclodes pabsti Sick, 1969

= Long-tailed cinclodes =

Species of bird in Brazil

The long-tailed cinclodes (Cinclodes pabsti) is a Near Threatened species of bird in the Furnariinae subfamily of the ovenbird family Furnariidae. It is endemic to Brazil.

== Taxonomy and systematics ==
The long-tailed cinclodes is basal to the genus Cinclodes and is not very closely related to other species of the genus. It has two subspecies, the nominate C. p. pabsti (Sick, 1969) and C. p. espinhacensis (Freitas, Chaves, Costa, Santos, FR & Rodrigues, 2012). The second was described as a full species but differs little genetically and morphologically from the nominate.

The long-tailed cinclodes' specific epithet commemorates the Brazilian botanist Guido Frederico João Pabst.

== Description ==
The long-tailed cinclodes is 20 to 22 cm (7.9 to 8.7 in) long and weighs 43 to 55 g (1.5 to 1.9 oz). It is a large cinclodes with a fairly long and straight bill. The sexes have the same plumage. Adults of the nominate subspecies have a wide, distinct, white supercilium that narrows past the eye and a dark band through the eye that widens over the ear coverts. Their upperparts are grayish brown with their crown slightly darker than the back. Their wing has two wide but indistinct cinnamon-buff bars and a wider band. Their tail is dark brown with buff or ochraceous tips on the outer feathers. Their throat is white and contrasts with the rest of their underparts, which are pale yellowish buffy-brown. Their iris is brown, their bill black whose mandible sometimes has a pale base, and their legs and feet gray to black. Subspecies C. p. espinhacensis is slightly smaller and lighter than the nominate and has lighter underparts and much darker upperparts.

== Distribution and habitat ==
The nominate subspecies of the long-tailed cinclodes is found in extreme southeastern Brazil between southeastern Santa Catarina and northeastern Rio Grande do Sul. It inhabits open landscapes such as temperate grasslands, pastures, and agricultural land. It usually occurs near water The landscapes are often rocky or near houses. In elevation it occurs between 750 and 1,700 m (2,500 and 5,600 ft). Subspecies C. p. espinhacensis is found only in a small part of Serra do Espinhaço in Minas Gerais. It inhabits campos rupestres, a montane savanna landscape with a patchwork of rock outcrops and open fields. It is known to occur between about 1,100 and 1,500 m (3,600 and 4,900 ft) of elevation.

== Behavior ==
=== Movement ===
The long-tailed cinclodes is a year-round resident in both its ranges.

=== Feeding ===
The long-tailed cinclodes feeds on arthropods and is thought to eat other invertebrates as well. It typically forages alone or in pairs. It is terrestrial, gleaning it prey from the ground, grass, and the edge of watercourses. Subspecies C. p. espinhacensis forages on rock outcrops in addition to open fields.

=== Breeding ===
The long-tailed cinclodes breeds in the austral spring and summer. It is thought to be monogamous. It makes a nest of grass and feathers in a rock crevice or a tunnel it excavates in a rocky soil bank; it has been known to nest in a hole in a house. Nothing else is known about its breeding biology.

=== Vocalization ===
The song of the long-tailed cinclodes' nominate subspecies is a "very high, short, sharp, crescendoing rattle/trill" that is sung from a perch or in flight. Its call is "a descending 'tseeoo' ". The song of C. p. espinhacensis is a "series of notes of which duration, energy, frequency and frequency range first increase gradually and then decrease again, with overall pace increasing steadily towards end" and its call is "generally rather similar to that of nominate but longer".

== Status ==
The IUCN in 2004 originally assessed the long-tailed cinclodes as being of Least Concern but in 2007 uplisted it to Near Threatened. It "has a small range within which habitat is becoming increasingly degraded, in particular owing to the development of pine plantations." Its population size is not known and is believed to be decreasing. The nominate subspecies is considered uncommon to fairly common; it occurs in one protected area. C. p. espinhacensis is known only from a small number of sites in Serra do Espinhaço, with a maximum extent of about 490 km^{2} (190 sq mi) and probably less. The habitat is threatened by numerous human activities including tourism, mining, and conversion for pasture and agriculture. It does occur in and near Serra do Cipó National Park.
