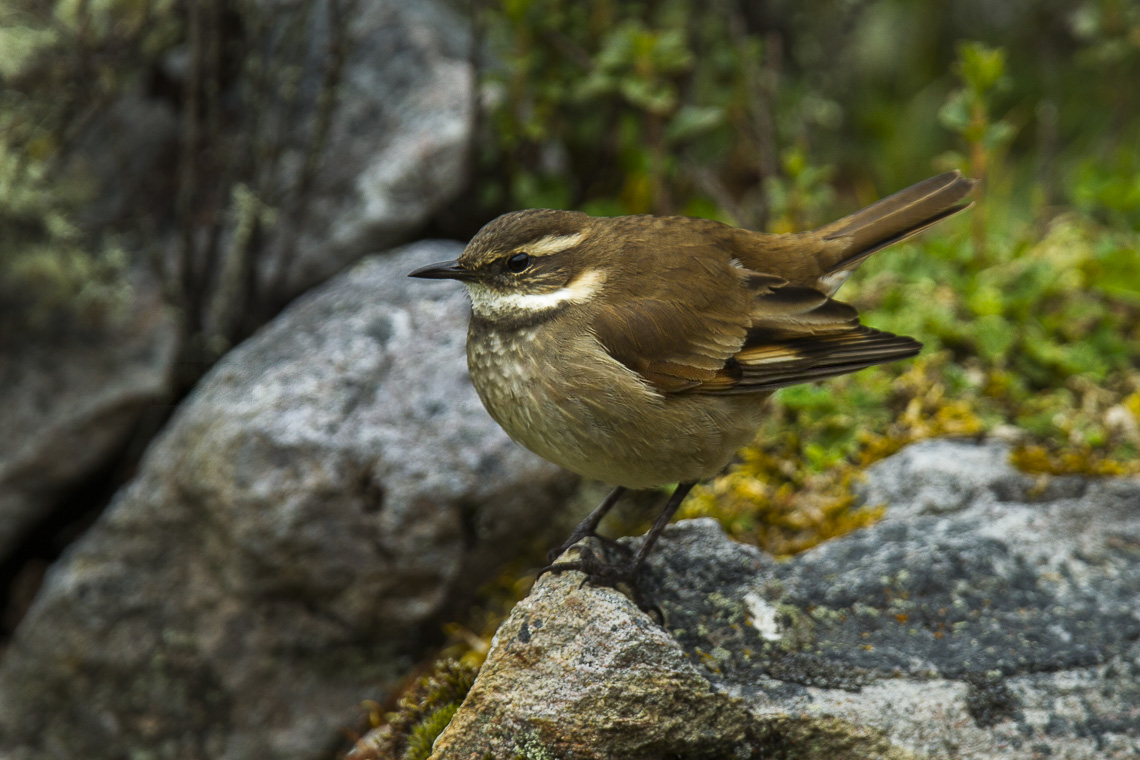

Conservation status
- Least Concern (IUCN 3.1)

Scientific classification
- Kingdom: Animalia
- Phylum: Chordata
- Class: Aves
- Order: Passeriformes
- Family: Furnariidae
- Genus: Cinclodes
- Species: C. albidiventris

Binomial name
- Cinclodes albidiventris Sclater, PL, 1860

Synonyms
- Cinclodes fuscus albidiventris

Audio
- Song of chestnut-winged cinclodes

= Chestnut-winged cinclodes =

Species of bird

The chestnut-winged cinclodes (Cinclodes albidiventris) is a species of bird in the family Furnariidae. It is found in Colombia, Venezuela, Ecuador, and Peru. It was formerly considered a subspecies of the bar-winged cinclodes. Its natural habitats are subtropical or tropical high-altitude shrubland and grassland.
