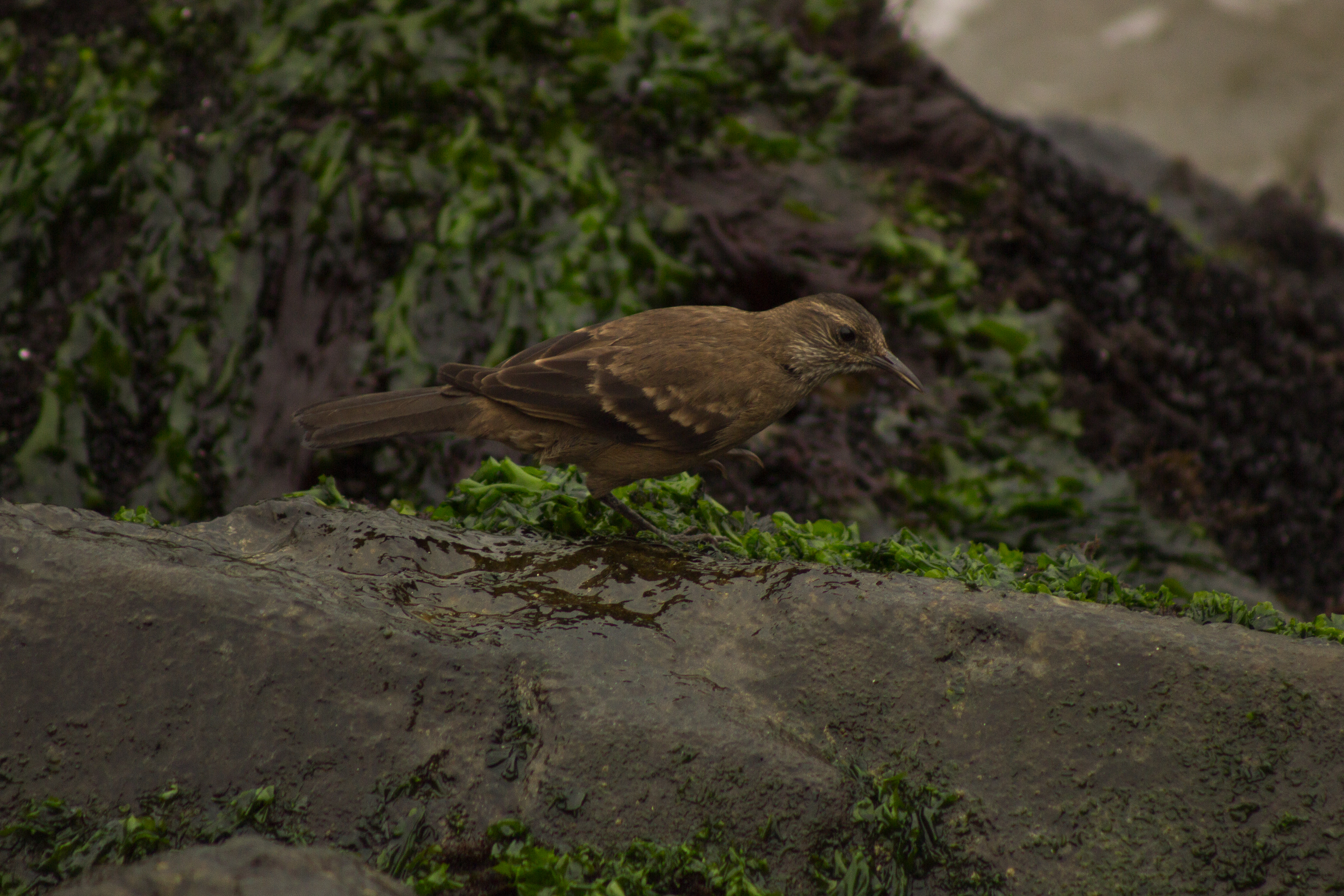

Conservation status
- Least Concern (IUCN 3.1)

Scientific classification
- Kingdom: Animalia
- Phylum: Chordata
- Class: Aves
- Order: Passeriformes
- Family: Furnariidae
- Genus: Cinclodes
- Species: C. taczanowskii

Binomial name
- Cinclodes taczanowskii Berlepsch & Stolzmann, 1892

= Peruvian seaside cinclodes =

Species of bird

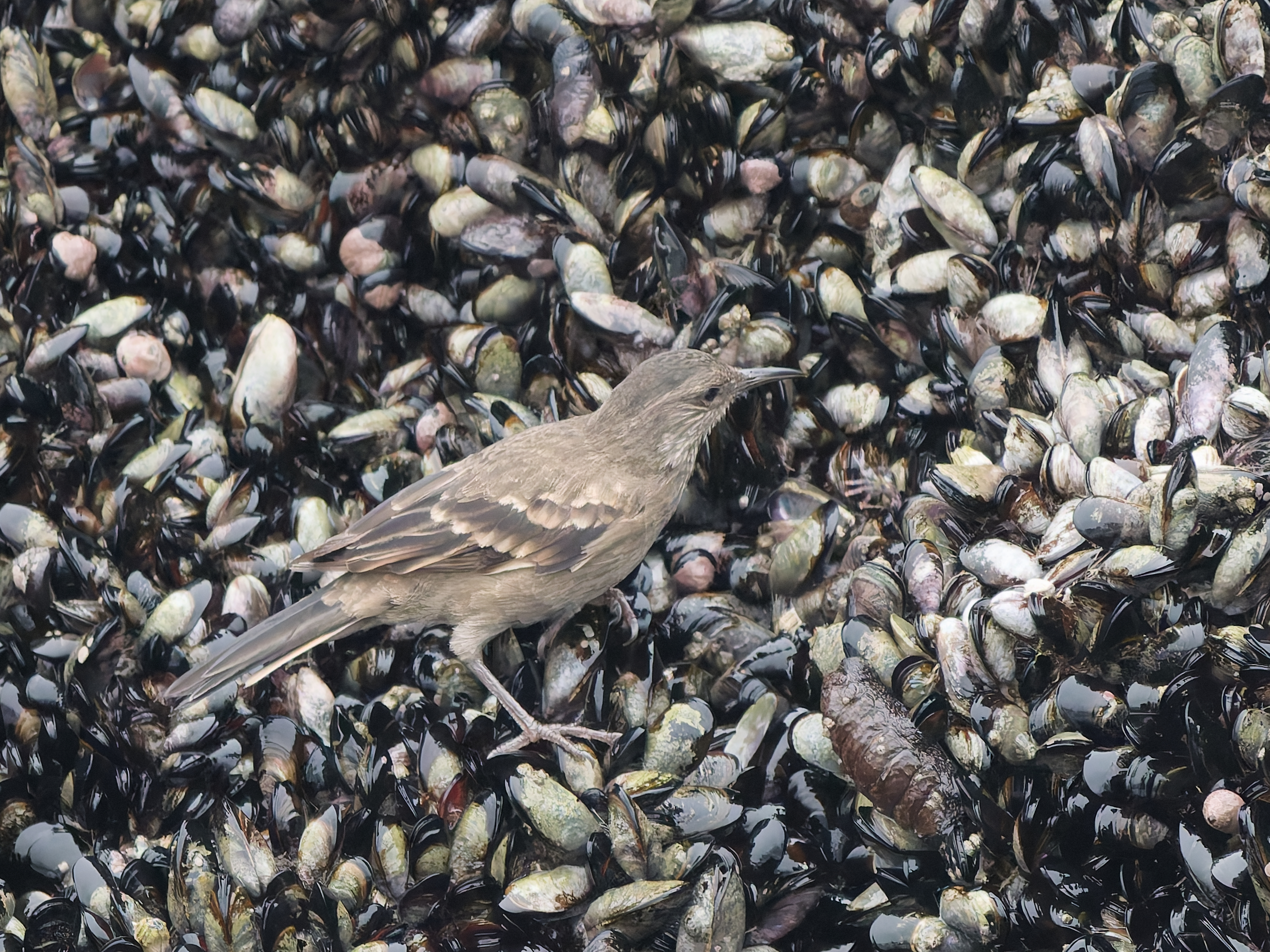
Surf Cinclodes endemic in Peru

The Peruvian seaside cinclodes or surf cinclodes (Cinclodes taczanowskii) is a species of bird in the Furnariinae subfamily of the ovenbird family Furnariidae. It is endemic to Peru.

== Taxonomy and systematics ==
The Peruvian seaside cinclodes and the Chilean seaside cinclodes (C. nigrofumosus) have on and off been considered separate species and conspecific. Studies in the twenty-first century show that they are very weakly differentiated genetically. As of 2023 they are treated as sister species, and the two are sister to the dark-bellied cinclodes (C. patagonicus). The South American Classification Committee of the American Ornithological Society is seeking a proposal to consider merging them.

The Peruvian seaside cinclodes is monotypic.

== Description ==
The Peruvian seaside cinclodes is about 21 cm (8.3 in) long and weighs about 63 g (2.2 oz). It is a large cinclodes with a straight bill. The sexes have the same plumages. Adults have an indistinct buffy brown supercilium on an otherwise brownish face. Their crown is dark sepia brown and their upperparts dark brown. Their wing coverts are dusky brown with paler edges. Their primaries are dusky brown and most have cinnamon buff or pale rufous bases. Their secondaries have blackish-bordered rufous bases and dusky brown tips. Their tertials are dusky brown with rufescent brown edges. Their tail is blackish brown; the outer three pairs of feathers have progressively more pale rufous on their tips. Their throat is dirty white with dusky spots, their breast brown with short pale streaks, and their belly plain brown.Their iris is brown, their bill black or brown, and their legs and feet dark gray-brown or black.

== Distribution and habitat ==
The Peruvian seaside cinclodes is found along the Peruvian coast from the Department of Ancash south to the Department of Tacna almost on the Chilean border, and on several nearshore islands. It inhabits the intertidal zone where it favors rocks though it will occasionally move onto adjacent sandy areas.

== Behavior ==
=== Movement ===
The Peruvian seaside cinclodes is a year-round resident throughout its range and essentially never leaves the water's edge.

=== Feeding ===
The sister Peruvian and Chilean seaside cinclodes are the only passerines that forage at the ocean's surf line. The Peruvian seaside cinclodes forages singly or in pairs, and feeds on aquatic invertebrates, though full details are lacking. Its diet is known to include small crabs and other crustaceans, small bivalves and snails, isopods, and beetles.

=== Breeding ===
Only one nest of the Peruvian seaside cinclodes has been described. It was a cup of algae with a few plant fibers and feathers placed in a rock crevice. It was active in February.

=== Vocalization ===
The song of the Peruvian seaside cinclodes has been described as "a trill" and its call as "an abrupt chec".

== Status ==
The IUCN has assessed the Peruvian seaside cinclodes as being of Least Concern. It has a limited range and an unknown population size that is believed to be stable. No immediate threats have been identified. It is considered fairly common and "probably is little affected by human activity".
