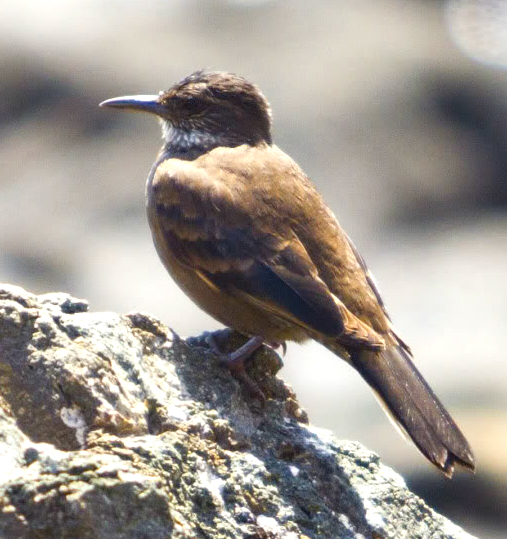

Conservation status
- Least Concern (IUCN 3.1)

Scientific classification
- Kingdom: Animalia
- Phylum: Chordata
- Class: Aves
- Order: Passeriformes
- Family: Furnariidae
- Genus: Cinclodes
- Species: C. nigrofumosus

Binomial name
- Cinclodes nigrofumosus (D'Orbigny & Lafresnaye, 1838)

Synonyms
- Uppucerthia nigro-fumosa (protonym)

= Chilean seaside cinclodes =

Species of bird

The Chilean seaside cinclodes or simply seaside cinclodes (Cinclodes nigrofumosus) is a species of bird in the Furnariinae subfamily of the ovenbird family Furnariidae. It is endemic to Chile.

== Taxonomy and systematics ==
The Chilean seaside cinclodes and the Peruvian seaside cinclodes (C. taczanowskii) have on and off been considered separate species and conspecific. Studies in the twenty-first century show that they are very weakly differentiated genetically. As of 2023 they are treated as sister species, and the two are sister to the dark-bellied cinclodes (C. patagonicus). The South American Classification Committee of the American Ornithological Society is seeking a proposal to consider merging them.

The Chilean seaside cinclodes is monotypic.

== Description ==
The Chilean seaside cinclodes is 21 to 27 cm (8.3 to 11 in) long and weighs 63 to 67 g (2.2 to 2.4 oz). It is a large cinclodes with a straight bill. The sexes have the same plumages. Adults have narrow pale buff or whitish supercilium on an otherwise blackish brown face. Their crown and upperparts are smoky black or blackish brown. Their wings are blackish with a pale rufous band at the base of the flight feathers. Their tail is black; the outer three pairs of feathers have pale rufous or ashy-brown tips. Their throat and the sides of the neck are white, their upper breast smoky gray with small white or pale cinnamon dots, their lower breast smoky gray with light cinnamon streaks, and their belly plain smoky gray.Their iris is brown or dark brown, their bill blackish, sometimes with a gray base on the mandible, and their legs and feet brownish gray to blackish. There is some hint that the species' plumage is clinal, with northern birds being somewhat paler than southern ones.

== Distribution and habitat ==
The Chilean seaside cinclodes is found along the Chilean coast from the Arica y Parinacota Region south to the Los Ríos Region, and on several nearshore islands. It inhabits the intertidal zone where it greatly favors rocks.

== Behavior ==
=== Movement ===
The Chilean seaside cinclodes is a year-round resident throughout its range and is seldom far from the water's edge.

=== Feeding ===
The sister Chilean and Peruvian seaside cinclodes are the only passerines that forage at the ocean's surf line. The Chilean seaside cinclodes forages singly or in pairs in the intertidal zone and adjacent sandy areas. It feeds on aquatic invertebrates such as small crabs and other crustaceans, marine worms, small bivalves and snails, limpets, and insects, and also on small fish.

=== Breeding ===
The Chilean seaside cinclodes' breeding season extends at least from August to January and possibly beyond. Males make a courtship and territorial display from a high rock by opening their wings and singing. The species makes a messy nest of herbs, algae, and lichen in a cavity in rocks, in a burrow it digs in an earthen bank, in roofs or other human structures, and even in abandoned pipes. The clutch size is two to four eggs. The incubation period and time to fledging are not known. Both parents provision nestlings.

=== Vocalization ===
The song of the Chilean seaside cinclodes is a "bright trilled series of piping whistles" that pairs sometimes sing in duet. Its calls include a "short, sharp, slightly metallic chik" that may be uttered in a series and a "repeated more subdued drier chuk" made by an adult feeding young.

== Status ==
The IUCN has assessed the Chilean seaside cinclodes as being of Least Concern. It has a fairly large range and an unknown population size that is believed to be stable. No immediate threats have been identified. It is considered locally fairly common but occurs in very few protected areas. Its habitat "could be altered by human activities at the coast line, such as constructions or other activities that alter the intertidal zone".
