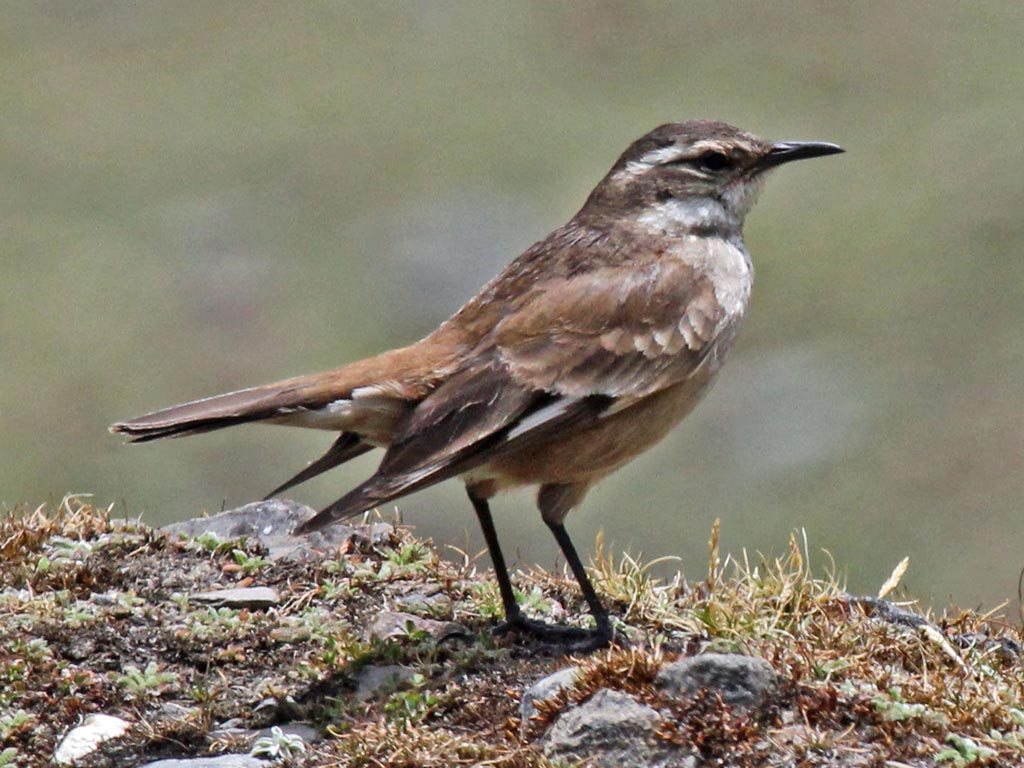

Conservation status
- Least Concern (IUCN 3.1)

Scientific classification
- Kingdom: Animalia
- Phylum: Chordata
- Class: Aves
- Order: Passeriformes
- Family: Furnariidae
- Genus: Cinclodes
- Species: C. albiventris

Binomial name
- Cinclodes albiventris (Philippi & Landbeck, 1861)

Synonyms
- Cinclodes fuscus albiventris

= Cream-winged cinclodes =

Species of bird

The cream-winged cinclodes (Cinclodes albiventris) is a species of bird in the Furnariinae subfamily of the ovenbird family Furnariidae. It is found in Argentina, Bolivia, Chile, and Peru.

== Taxonomy and systematics ==
The cream-winged cinclodes was previously considered conspecific with what was then called the bar-winged cinclodes (C. fuscus sensu lato). In a three-way split of the bar-winged that began in about 2009, the cream-winged cinclodes was recognized as a full species. C. fuscus was renamed to the present buff-winged cinclodes to avoid confusion with the previous much more complex species.

The cream-winged cinclodes has these five subspecies:

- C. a. albiventris (Philippi & Landbeck, 1861)
- C. a. tucumanus Chapman, 1919
- C. a. riojanus Nores, 1986
- C. a. rufus Nores, 1986
- C. a. yzurietae Nores, 1986

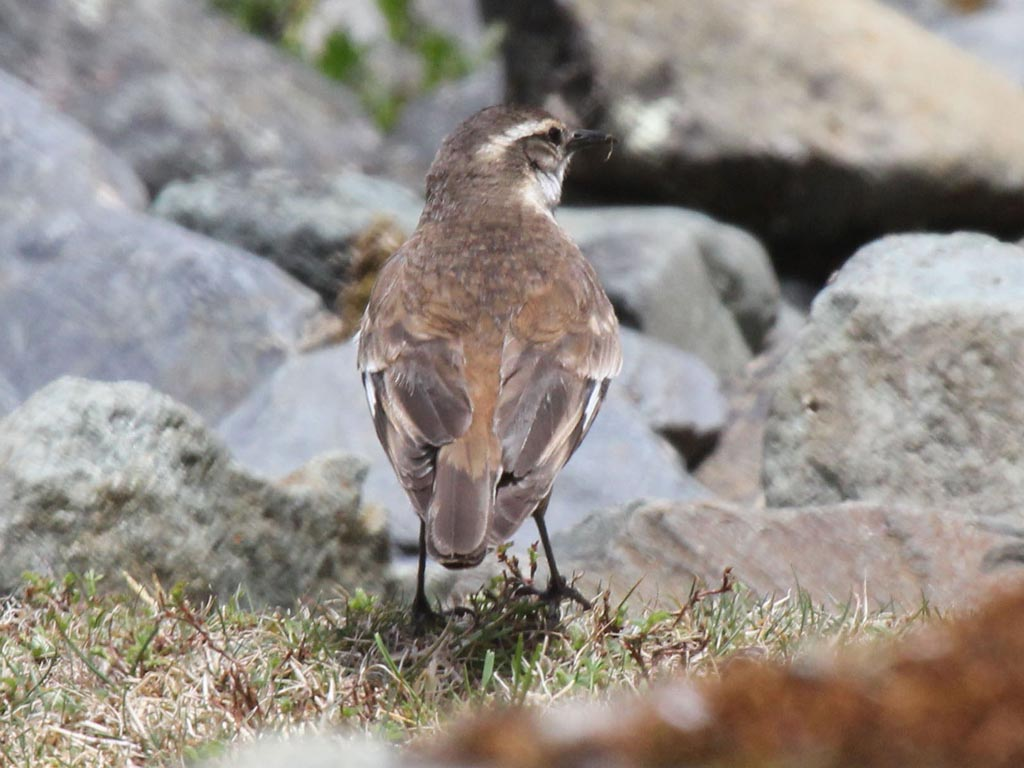

== Description ==
The cream-winged cinclodes is 15 to 19 cm (5.9 to 7.5 in) long and weighs about 20 to 34 g (0.71 to 1.2 oz). It is a small cinclodes with a shortish bill. The sexes have the same plumage. Adults of the nominate subspecies C. a. albiventris have a distinct light buffish white supercilium, dark gray-brown ear coverts with pale streaks, and a white malar area. Their crown and upperparts are rusty-gray. Their wing coverts are dark brown with wide buffish edges and their flight feathers dark fuscous with a cream band across them. Their tail's central feathers are dark brown and the rest blackish brown; the outer three pairs have progressively more milky-buff tips. Their entire underparts are whitish. Their iris is brown or dark brown, their bill dark brown to blackish whose mandible often has a paler base, and their legs and feet blackish to dark brownish.

Subspecies C. a. yzurietae has darker brown crown and upperparts and a much whiter breast than the nominate. C. a. rufus has more rufescent upperparts, richer brown wings and tail, a more ochraceous belly, and more rufescent flanks than the nominate. C. a. riojanus has darker chocolate-brown upperparts and a browner breast than all the other subspecies. C. a. tucumanus has a deep buff wingband and a more reddish back and paler underparts than riojanus.

== Distribution and habitat ==
The nominate subspecies of the cream-winged cinclodes is by far the most widespread. It is found in the Andes from northern Peru south through western Bolivia and northern Chile into northwestern Argentina as far as La Rioja Province. C. a. tucumanus is found in Argentina's Tucumán Province. C. a. riojanus is found in the Sierra de Famatina in La Rioja. C. a. rufus is found in northwestern Argentina, in the Campo de Arenal area of Catamarca Province. C. a. yzurietae is also found in Catamarca, in the Sierra del Manchao.

The cream-winged cinclodes inhabits a variety of open habitats, most of them grassy such as páramo and puna grassland, nearby agricultural fields, and also arid montane scrublands. It usually is found near water, especially bogs and streams, and is commonly seen around human habitations. In elevation it occurs between 2,500 and 5,000 m (8,200 and 16,400 ft) in Chile, mostly between 2,750 and 4,800 m (9,000 and 15,700 ft) in Peru, and usually above 2,100 m (6,900 ft) in Argentina.

== Behavior ==
=== Movement ===
The cream-winged cinclodes is mostly a year-round resident throughout its range, though some individuals move to lower elevations in winter, during periods of bad weather, or when favored feeding areas dry up.

=== Feeding ===
The cream-winged cinclodes feeds on a variety of invertebrates including many insects and also seeds. It forages singly and in pairs while hopping and running on the ground. It probes and gleans from wet and dry ground, rocks, grass, dung, and shallow water.

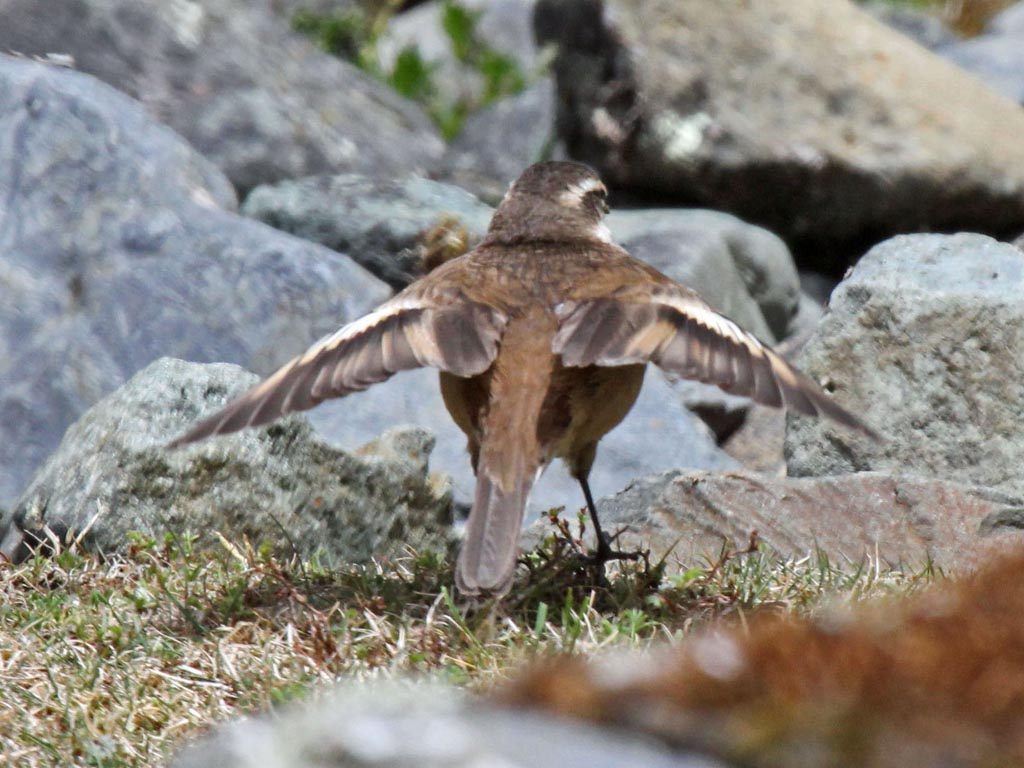

=== Breeding ===
The cream-winged cinclodes breeds in the austral spring and summer. It is monogamous. Males sing and make a wing-flapping display from a perch. The species nests in a burrow at the end of a tunnel it excavates in an earth bank; it probably also nests in holes in a human structure's wall. It floors the nest chamber with grass and hair. The clutch size is two eggs. The incubation period, time to fledging, and details of parental care are not known. It is suspected to occasionally fledge two broods in a season.

=== Vocalization ===
The cream-winged cinclodes' song has been rendered as "cheet, cheet, cheet, prre EEEEOOOO, OOOOEEEEEE'cheet' cheet'cheet...", though in Chile it has been described as "a rising twittery trill, 'trrrreee'i'i'i'i'i' ". Its calls are thought to be similar to those of the buff-winged cinclodes, which are "a sharp 'pfip'...[a] series of high-pitched tinkling notes [and in flight] a sharp whistled 'tsip' ".

== Status ==
The IUCN has assessed the cream-winged cinclodes as being of Least Concern. It has a large range. Its population size is not known but is believed to be stable. No immediate threats have been identified. It is considered widespread and common in most of its range, and in some areas is the most common cinclodes. In much of its range "its habitats are subject to, at most, only minimal anthropogenic disturbance; probably benefits from effects of grazing".
