= Roberto Dabbene =

Italian-Argentine ornithologist

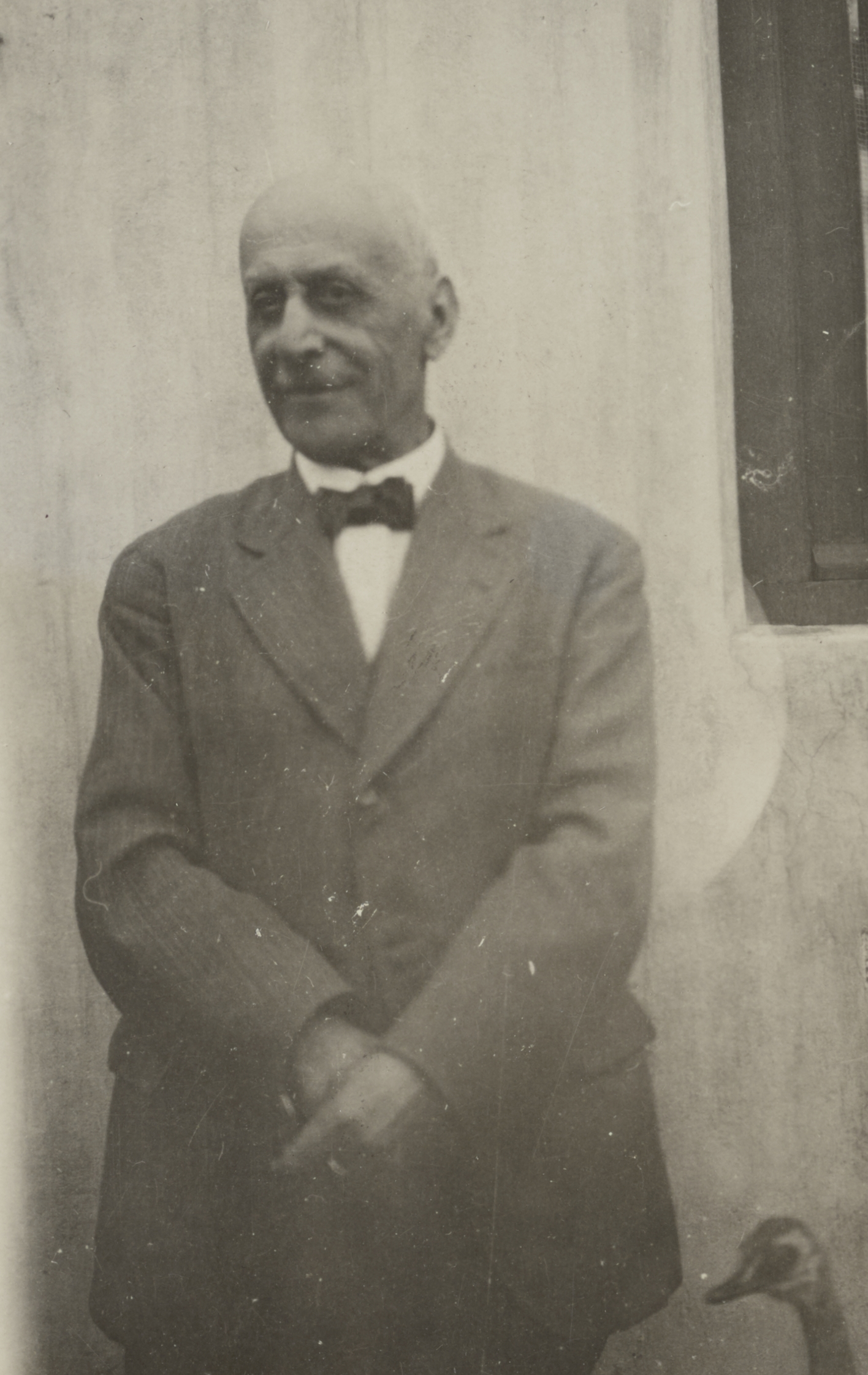
Portrait c. 1930

Roberto Raul Dabbene (17 January 1864– 20 October 1938) was an Italian-Argentine ornithologist.

Born in Turin, he studied at the University of Turin and received a doctorate in 1884 from the University of Genoa and moved to Argentina in 1887. After teaching chemistry at the Universidad Nacional de Córdoba, he moved to Buenos Aires in 1890 where he was inspired to study birds by Dr. E. L. Homberg who made him a member of the zoo staff. He studied the Argentine birds for over 40 years, and became curator of birds at the National Museum and writing many of the most important books on the subject. He was a founder of the journal El Hornero.

== Works ==
- "Contribución a la ornitología del Paraguay", Anales del Museo Nacional de Buenos Aires 23: 283-390 (1912)
- "Notas sobre una colección de Avesde la Isla Martín García", El Hornero 1 (1917). (1): 29-34; (2): 89-96; (3): 160-168; (4): 236–248.
- "Los pingüinos de las costas e islas de los mares argentinos", El Hornero 2 (1): 1-9 (1920)
- "Tres aves nuevas para la avifauna uruguaya", El Hornero 3 (4): 422 (1926)
- "The ornithological collection of the Museo Nacional, Buenos Aires its origin, development and present condition", The Auk Vol. 43 N. 1: 37-46 (1926)
- "Las palomas y tórtolas de la Argentina", Revista Diosa Cazadora, Suplemento (125) (1938)
- "Fauna Magallánica. Mamíferos y aves de la Tierra del Fuego e islas adyacentes"
