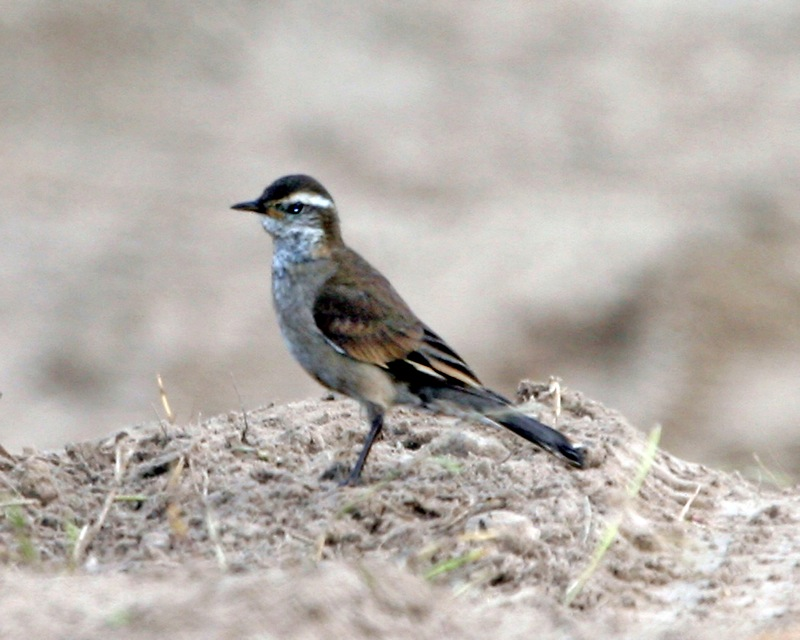

Conservation status
- Least Concern (IUCN 3.1)

Scientific classification
- Kingdom: Animalia
- Phylum: Chordata
- Class: Aves
- Order: Passeriformes
- Family: Furnariidae
- Genus: Cinclodes
- Species: C. fuscus

Binomial name
- Cinclodes fuscus (Vieillot, 1818)

Synonyms
- Cinclodes fuscus fuscus

= Buff-winged cinclodes =

Species of bird

The buff-winged cinclodes (Cinclodes fuscus) is a species of bird in the Furnariinae subfamily of the ovenbird family Furnariidae. It is found in Argentina, Brazil, Chile, Paraguay, Uruguay and as a vagrant on the Falkland Islands.

== Taxonomy and systematics ==
The buff-winged cinclodes was previously known as the bar-winged cinclodes and included the many subspecies of what are now the cream-winged cinclodes (C. albiventris) and chestnut-winged cinclodes (C. albidiventris). Following the recognition of the three-way split that began in about 2009, C. fuscus was renamed to the present buff-winged cinclodes to avoid confusion with the previous much more complex species.

The buff-winged cinclodes is monotypic.

== Description ==
The buff-winged cinclodes is 15 to 19.4 cm (5.9 to 7.6 in) long and weighs 29 to 33 g (1.0 to 1.2 oz). It is a small cinclodes with a shortish bill. The sexes have the same plumage. Adults have a distinct light buffish white supercilium, dark gray-brown ear coverts with pale streaks, and a bright white malar area that flares to the rear. Their forehead is speckled, their crown dark gray-brown, and their upperparts dark brown. Their wing coverts are dark brown with wide buffish edges and their flight feathers dark fuscous with a narrow tawny-rufous band across them. Their tail's central feathers are dark brown and the rest blackish brown; the outer three pairs have progressively more pale tawny tips with the outermost of all having a tawny outer web. Their chin is white, their throat white with thin dark scallops, their breast dull pale brown with faint buff streaks, their belly whitish buff, their flanks dull brown, and their undertail coverts mottled brown and buff. Their iris is brown or dark brown, their bill dark brown to blackish whose mandible often has a paler base, and their legs and feet blackish to dark brownish. Juveniles are more richly colored than adults and have dark edges on most of their underparts' feathers.

== Distribution and habitat ==
The buff-winged cinclodes is found year-round in central and southern Chile and most of central and southern Argentina including Tierra del Fuego, and as a migrant to northern Argentina, southern Brazil, southeastern Paraguay, and Uruguay. It has also been recorded as a vagrant on the Falkland Islands. It inhabits a variety of open habitats, most of them grassy such as páramo, puna, and temperate grasslands. It also occurs in arid montane scrublands, on Patagonian steppes and beaches, and in open Patagonian woodlands. It usually is found near water, especially bogs and streams, and is commonly seen around human habitations. In elevation it occurs from sea level to 3,000 m (9,800 ft).

== Behavior ==
=== Movement ===
The buff-winged cinclodes is partly migratory. Much of the populations in Tierra del Fuego and Patagonia move north after the breeding season, as apparently do some from the year-round range. In the austral winter they are found in northern Argentina, southeastern Paraguay, much of Uruguay, and as far north in Brazil as Rio Grande do Sul and Santa Catarina states. Some also remain approximately at their breeding latitude but move to lower elevations.

=== Feeding ===
The buff-winged cinclodes feeds on a wide variety of invertebrates including many insects and some molluscs; it also feeds on seeds. It forages singly and in pairs while hopping and running on the ground. It probes and gleans from wet and dry ground, rocks, beach debris, grass, dung, and shallow water.

=== Breeding ===
The buff-winged cinclodes breeds in the austral summer of September to January or beyond. The species is monogamous. Males sing and make a wing-flapping display from a perch. The species nests in a burrow at the end of tunnel it excavates in an earth bank, in a crevice among rocks, in a hole in a human structure's wall, and occasionally in an old woodpecker hole. Both members of a pair make a pad of grass and hair in the chamber. The clutch size is two to four eggs. The incubation period, time to fledging, and details of parental care are not known.

=== Vocalization ===
The buff-winged cinclodes' song is "a short, fast, dry trill, 't-r-r-r-r-r-r-r-r-r-t', lasting c. 2 seconds, often introduced by call notes", and can be sung from the ground, from a rock, and in flight. Its calls include "a sharp 'pfip'...[a] series of high-pitched tinkling notes [and in flight] a sharp whistled 'tsip' ".

== Status ==
The IUCN has assessed the buff-winged cinclodes as being of Least Concern. It has a very large range, and though its population size is not known it is believed to be stable. No immediate threats have been identified. It is considered widespread and common in most of its range, and in some areas is the most common cinclodes. In much of its range "its habitats are subject to, at most, only minimal anthropogenic disturbance; probably benefits from effects of grazing".
