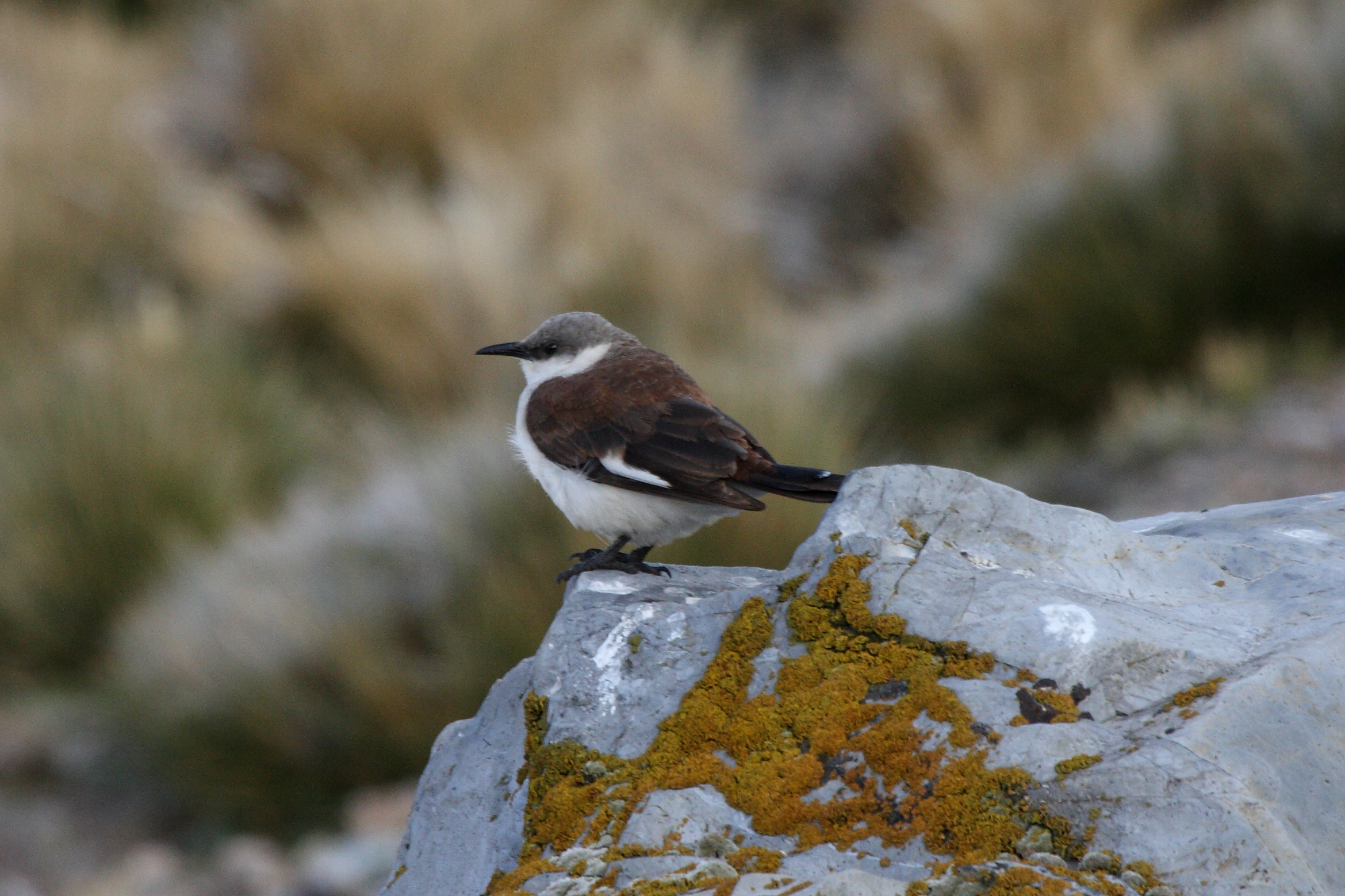

Conservation status
- Critically Endangered (IUCN 3.1)

Scientific classification
- Kingdom: Animalia
- Phylum: Chordata
- Class: Aves
- Order: Passeriformes
- Family: Furnariidae
- Genus: Cinclodes
- Species: C. palliatus

Binomial name
- Cinclodes palliatus (Tschudi, 1844)

= White-bellied cinclodes =

Species of bird

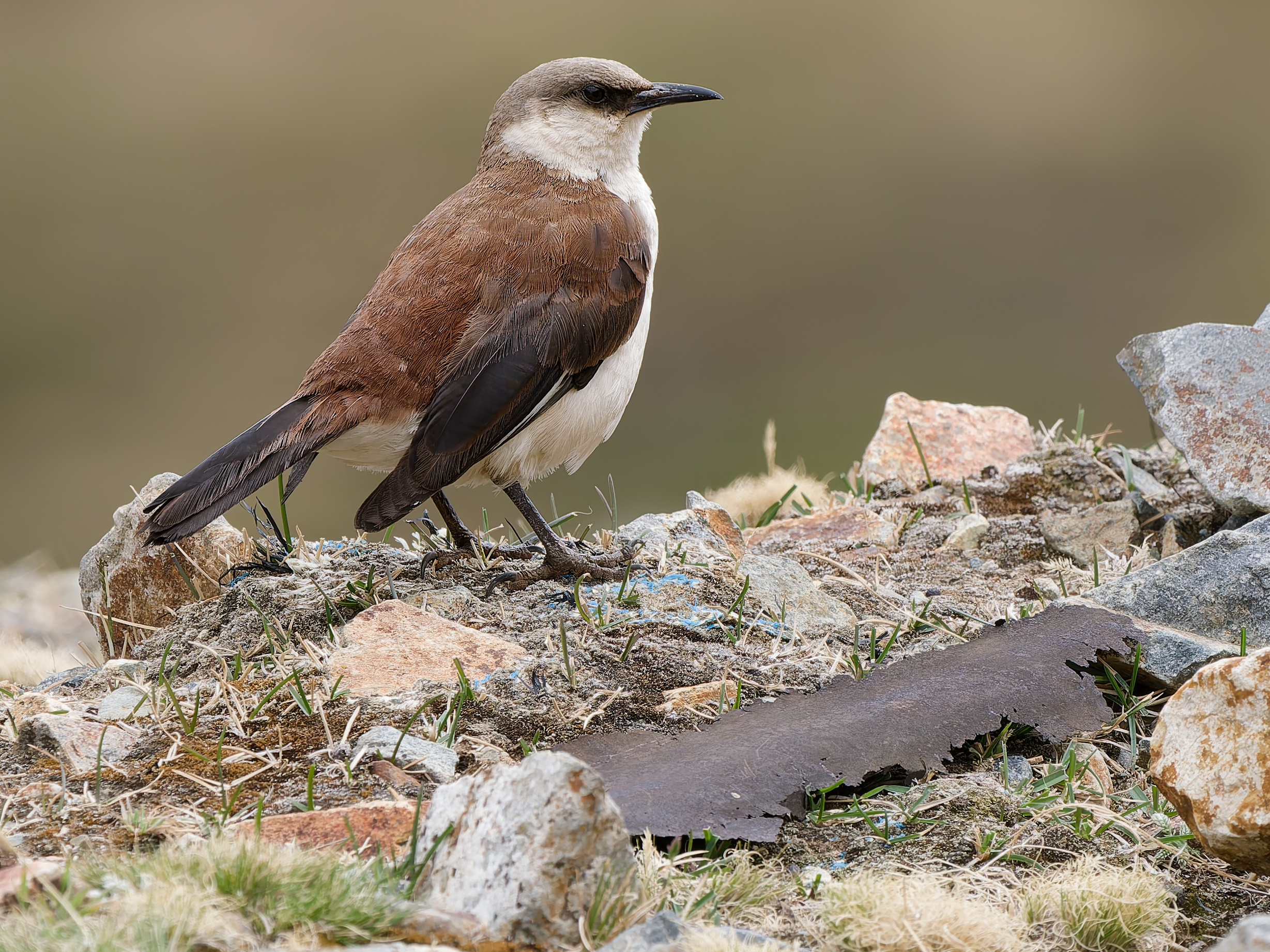
White-bellied Cinclodes endemic in Peru

The white-bellied cinclodes (Cinclodes palliatus) is a species of bird in the ovenbird family, Furnariidae. It is endemic to Peru where it inhabits high level, marshy grassland in the Junín Region and possibly also in the Huancavelica Region. This is a very large furnariid with dark upper parts and gleaming white underparts. It is a rare bird with very specific habitat requirements and is threatened by habitat destruction. The International Union for Conservation of Nature has assessed it as being "critically endangered".

== Description ==
The white-bellied cinclodes is larger and has a longer tail than other members of its genus and more resembles a mockingbird than a typical Cinclodes. It grows to a length of about 24 cm (9 in). The crown is brownish-grey, the upper parts and wings rufous-brown with a broad white wing bar, and the underparts pure white. This bird's song is a rapid chattering "pipipipipi pi pi" that sometimes speeds up into a piping, higher-pitched "wee wee wee wee wee".

== Distribution and habitat ==
This species is known only from a high altitude strip of land in Junín Region in Peru. It has previously also been recorded in the Huancavelica Region but recent surveys of that area have failed to find it. It has very specific habitat requirements; it needs mineral-rich, boggy terrain where such cushion plants as Distichia grow, with crags and rocky slopes nearby. Its altitudinal range is about 4,430 m (14,530 ft) to the snowline at around 5,000 m (16,400 ft). This habitat is often found near the foot of glaciers, but there is much apparently suitable habitat where the birds are not present.

== Ecology ==
The white-bellied cinclodes forages in pairs or small groups, pushing its beak into the wet ground to find worms and other invertebrates. Its breeding habits are not well known, but the nest is usually hidden in a rock crevice.

== Status ==
As a result of a survey in 2003, the number of birds was estimated to be in the range 200–1000. No previously unknown locations were found. Between 2008 and 2011, further survey work was undertaken; 104 bogs were visited and 113 birds were recorded inhabiting 18 of them, giving an estimated total population of birds of under 300. Their habitat is being disturbed by mining activities and the dumping of spoil from mines, the extraction of peat, and overgrazing by alpacas, llamas and sheep. If these activities continue there is a poor outlook for the birds, and as a result the International Union for Conservation of Nature have assessed them as being "critically endangered".

== Threats ==
Suitable habitat for the White-bellied cinclodes, previously experiencing minimal human disturbance due to its high-altitude location, now contends with escalating pressures. In recent years, the utilization of peat for mushroom cultivation, private gardening, and public parks in Lima has surged, resulting in the rapid destruction of bogs as the soil is transported to Lima. This altering land use pattern has significant consequences for the bird's habitat.

The species' habitat faces challenges from overgrazing by alpacas, llamas, and sheep, which impact the quality of suitable areas. Mining activities further contribute to habitat degradation by depositing waste materials in bogs and lakes, along with the deliberate draining of certain bogs. This deliberate draining affects more than 50% of suitable sites, causing a decline in suitable habitat availability for the White-bellied cinclodes.

Wetland areas within the species' range confront a different peril in the form of water extraction for agricultural purposes. This practice threatens the integrity of these crucial ecosystems, which the White-bellied cinclodes relies on for its survival.

With its montane distribution near the upper altitude limit of its range, the White-bellied cinclodes is potentially susceptible to the effects of climate change. These changing climatic conditions could further jeopardize the species, adding to the cumulative threats it already faces.
