= Treehunter =

Treehunter may refer to:

- Cryptic treehunter (Cichlocolaptes mazarbarnetti)
- Pale-browed treehunter (Cichlocolaptes leucophrus)
- Uniform treehunter (Thripadectes ignobilis)
- Striped treehunter (Thripadectes holostictus)
- Sharp-billed treehunter (Heliobletus contaminatus)
- Peruvian treehunter (Thripadectes scrutator)
- Streak-breasted treehunter (Thripadectes rufobrunneus)
- Flammulated treehunter (Thripadectes flammulatus)
- Streak-capped treehunter (Thripadectes virgaticeps)
- Black-billed treehunter (Thripadectes melanorhynchus)
