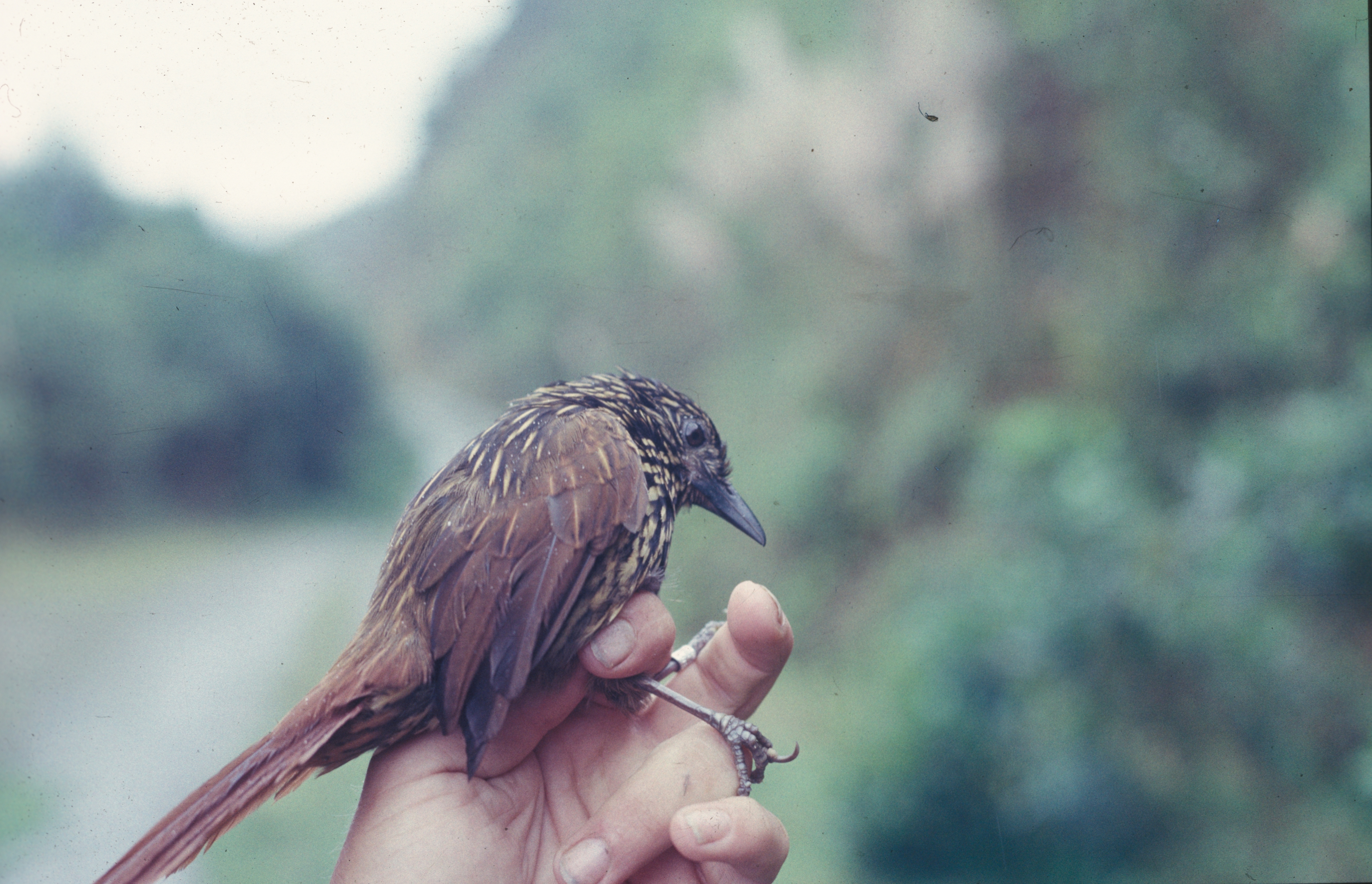
- Flammulated treehunter (Thripadectes flammulatus)

Scientific classification
- Kingdom: Animalia
- Phylum: Chordata
- Class: Aves
- Order: Passeriformes
- Family: Furnariidae
- Genus: Thripadectes; P.L. Sclater, 1862

Type species
- Anabates flammulatus Eyton, 1849

Species
- 7, see text

= Thripadectes =

Genus of birds

Thripadectes is a genus of Neotropical birds in the ovenbird family Furnariidae.

== Taxonomy ==
The genus was established by Philip Sclater in 1862 with the flammulated treehunter as the type species. The name Thripadectes is a combination of the Greek words thrips or thripos, meaning "woodworm" and dēktēs, meaning "biter" (from daknō, meaning "to bite").

The genus contains seven species:

Image	Scientific name	Common Name	Distribution
	Thripadectes ignobilis	Uniform treehunter	Colombian and Ecuadorian Andes
	Thripadectes flammulatus	Flammulated treehunter	Colombian and Ecuadorian Andes
	Thripadectes scrutator	Peruvian treehunter	eastern Peruvian and Bolivian Andes
	Thripadectes rufobrunneus	Streak-breasted treehunter	Talamancan montane forests
	Thripadectes melanorhynchus	Black-billed treehunter	northern Andes
	Thripadectes holosticus	Striped treehunter	northern Andes
	Thripadectes virgaticeps	Streak-capped treehunter	Andes of Venezuela to Ecuador
