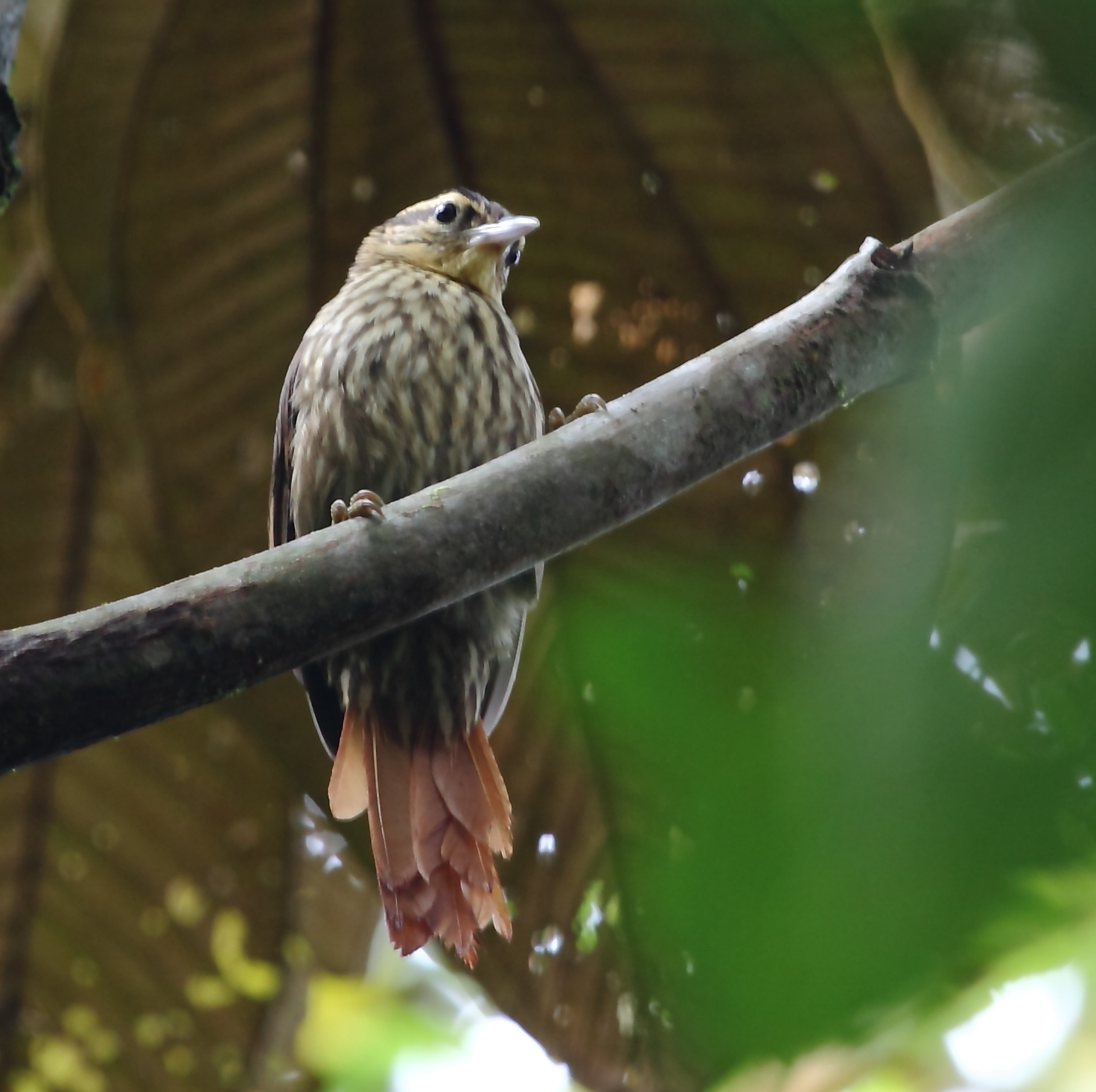
- Pale-browed treehunter at São Luiz do Paraitinga, São Paulo State, Brazil

Scientific classification
- Kingdom: Animalia
- Phylum: Chordata
- Class: Aves
- Order: Passeriformes
- Family: Furnariidae
- Genus: Cichlocolaptes; Reichenbach, 1853

Type species
- Anabates ferruginolentus = Anabates leucophrus zu Wied, 1831

Species
- See text

= Cichlocolaptes =

Genus of birds

Cichlocolaptes is a genus of passerine birds in the ovenbird family Furnariidae. They are found in Brazil.

== Taxonomy ==
The genus Cichlocolaptes was introduced in 1853 by the German naturalist Ludwig Reichenbach. The name combines the Ancient Greek kikhlē meaning "thrush" with kolaptēs meaning "chiseller". The type species was designated by George Robert Gray in 1855 as Anabates ferruginolentus Wied. This taxon is a junior synonym of Anabates leucophrus (pale-browed treehunter) described by William Jardine & Prideaux John Selby in 1830.

=== Species ===
The genus contains two species:

- Pale-browed treehunter (Cichlocolaptes leucophrus)
- Cryptic treehunter (Cichlocolaptes mazarbarnetti)
