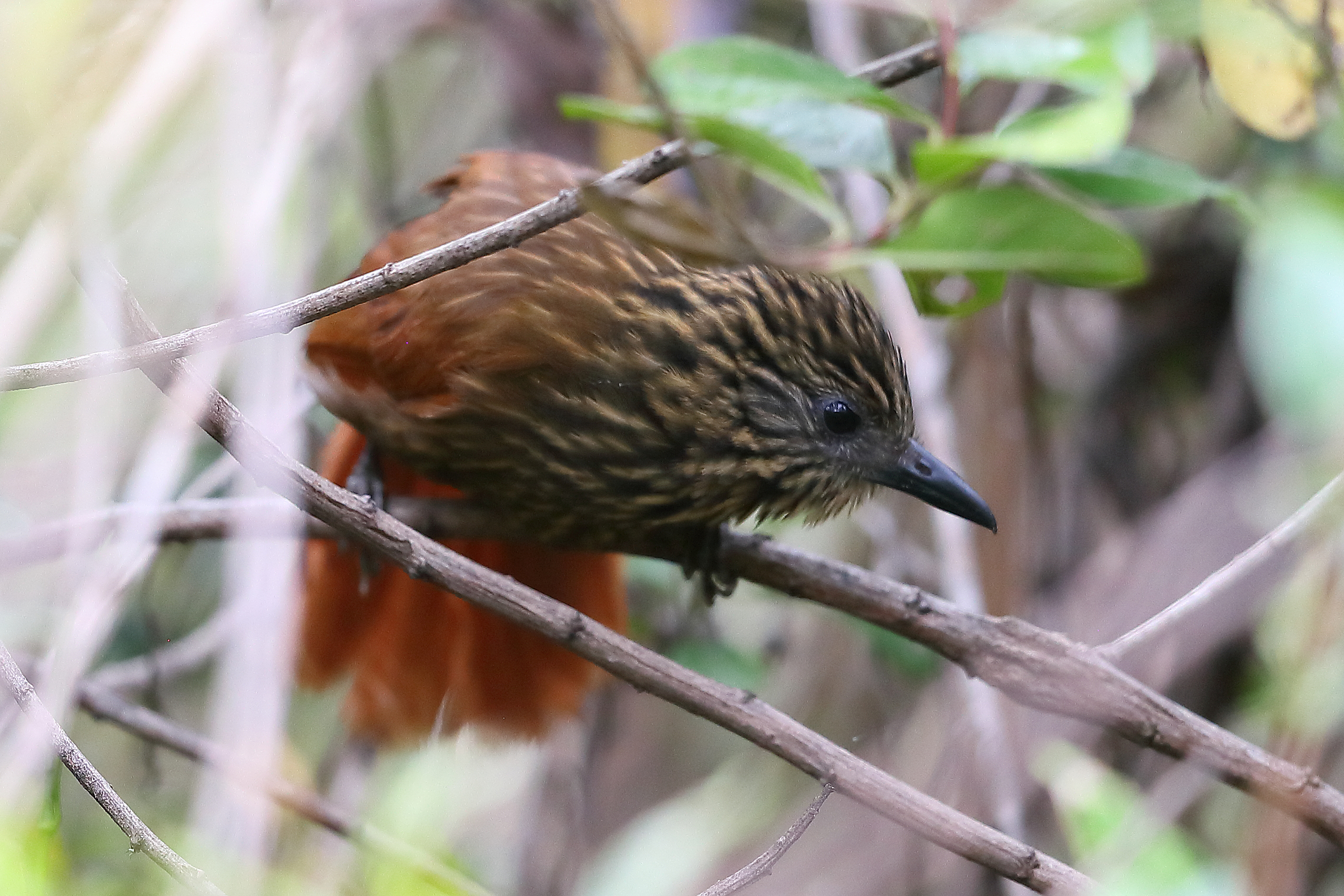

Conservation status
- Least Concern (IUCN 3.1)

Scientific classification
- Kingdom: Animalia
- Phylum: Chordata
- Class: Aves
- Order: Passeriformes
- Family: Furnariidae
- Genus: Thripadectes
- Species: T. scrutator

Binomial name
- Thripadectes scrutator Taczanowski, 1874

= Peruvian treehunter =

Species of bird

The Peruvian treehunter (Thripadectes scrutator) is a species of bird in the Furnariinae subfamily of the ovenbird family Furnariidae. It is found in Bolivia and Peru. It is also called the rufous-backed treehunter or buff-throated treehunter.

== Taxonomy and systematics ==
The Peruvian treehunter is a sister species of the uniform treehunter (T. ignobilis) and flammulated treehunter (T. flammulatus). It is monotypic. However, the individuals in the southern part of the species' range are more reddish than the northern ones and might warrant recognition as a subspecies.

== Description ==
The Peruvian treehunter is 23 to 24 cm (9.1 to 9.4 in) long and weighs 56 to 61 g (2.0 to 2.2 oz). It is a robust furnariid with a heavy bill. The sexes have the same plumage. Adults have a blackish face with sharp buff streaks. Their lores are blackish speckled buff. Their crown, the sides of their neck, and their upper back are blackish with wide but diffuse buff streaks that disappear by the lower back. Their lower back is rich brown with faint rufous streaks that disappear into the dark rufous rump. Their uppertail coverts are chestnut. Their wing coverts are chestnut, their flight feathers pale rufous-chestnut, and their tail chestnut. Their throat and breast are blackish with buff streaks that are heaviest on the upper breast. Their lower breast, belly, and flanks are brownish with faint buff streaks that fade towards the bottom. Their undertail coverts are rufous. Their iris is brown to dark brown, their bill black, and their legs and feet gray to brown.

== Distribution and habitat ==
The Peruvian treehunter is found along the east slope of the Andes from northern Peru's Department of Amazonas through Peru south and east of the Marañón River into Bolivia as far as Cochabamba Department. It inhabits the zone from upper elevation cloudforest into elfin forest, a humid landscape where it favors large dense stands of Chusquea bamboo. In elevation it ranges from 2,450 to 3,500 m (8,000 to 11,500 ft).

== Behavior ==
=== Movement ===
The Peruvian treehunter is a year-round resident throughout its range.

=== Feeding ===
The Peruvian treehunter is reported to feed on arthropods, molluscs, and small vertebrates. It forages in dense undergrowth, usually within about 2 m (7 ft) of the ground, and is usually by itself though occasionally in pairs. It very rarely joins mixed-species feeding flocks. Its feeding technique is not well known but it is believed to probe and glean in moss and foliage along bamboo, tree limbs, and trunks.

=== Breeding ===
The Peruvian treehunter is thought to be monogamous. Nothing else is known about its breeding biology.

=== Vocalization ===
The Peruvian treehunter's song is "a loud rattle, consisting of a rapid series of rising-falling/accelerating-decelerating notes tchu-tchu-tchu-tchu'TCHI'TCHI'TCHI'TCHI'TCHI'TCHI' tchu'tchu-tchu-tchu-tchu. Its call is "a sharp, loud TCHIK".

== Status ==
The IUCN has assessed the Peruvian treehunter as being of Least Concern. It has a large range and an unknown population size that is believed to be stable. No immediate threats have been identified. It is a poorly-known species that appears to be thinly distributed. Its habitat is being "cleared and/or fragmented at an alarming rate throughout the species range. The effects of these anthropogenic effects on Rufous-backed Treehunter populations remain unknown".
