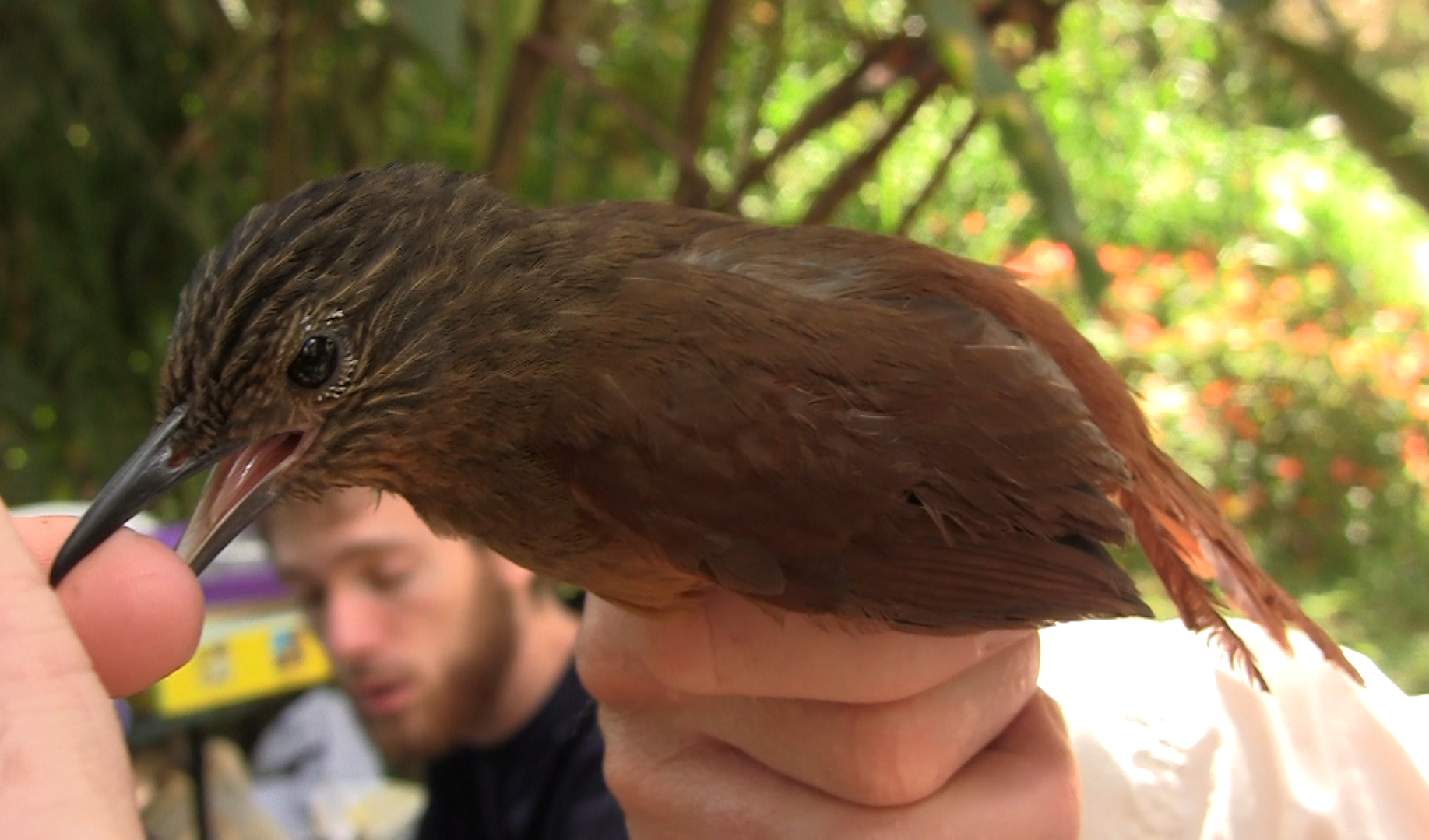
- Captured striped treehunter at Bellavista Reserve, Ecuador
- Striped treehunter song, Ecuador

Conservation status
- Least Concern (IUCN 3.1)

Scientific classification
- Kingdom: Animalia
- Phylum: Chordata
- Class: Aves
- Order: Passeriformes
- Family: Furnariidae
- Genus: Thripadectes
- Species: T. holostictus

Binomial name
- Thripadectes holostictus (Sclater, PL & Salvin, 1876)
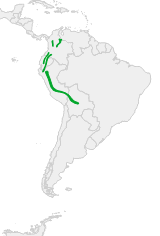
- Distribution of the striped treehunter

Synonyms
- Automolus holostrictus

= Striped treehunter =

Species of bird

The striped treehunter (Thripadectes holostictus) is a species of bird in the Furnariinae subfamily of the ovenbird family Furnariidae. It is found in Bolivia, Colombia, Ecuador, Peru, and Venezuela.

== Taxonomy and systematics ==
The striped treehunter shares genus Thripadectes with six other treehunters. It has these three subspecies:

- T. h. holostictus (Sclater, PL & Salvin, 1876)
- T. h. moderatus Zimmer, JT, 1935
- T. h. striatidorsus (Berlepsch & Taczanowski, 1884)

However, the subspecies' size and plumage differences may prove to be clinal as more data become available. If true, the division into subspecies might not be warranted.

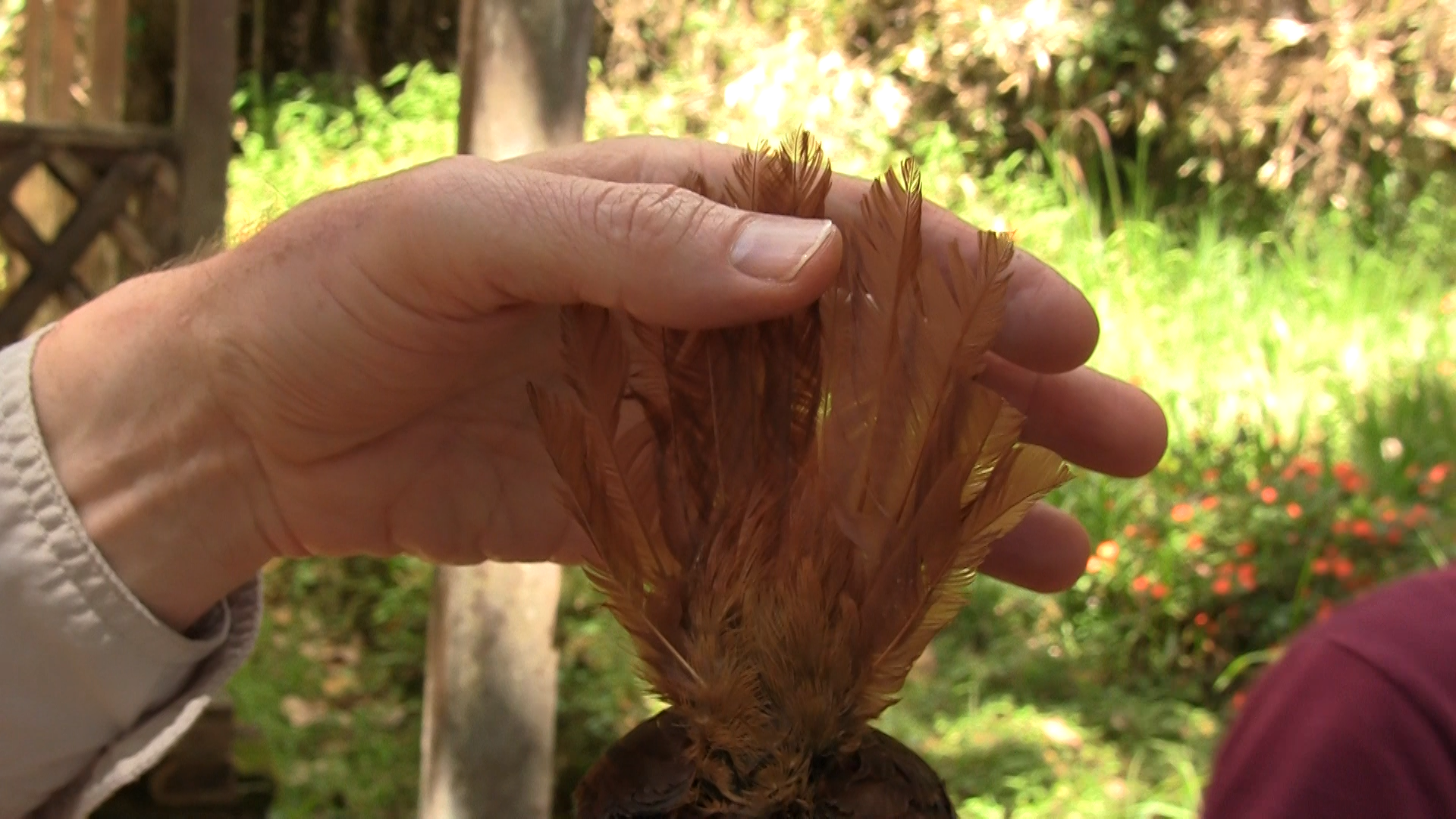
Captured striped treehunter at Bellavista

== Description ==
The striped treehunter is 20 to 21 cm (7.9 to 8.3 in) long and weighs 38 to 49 g (1.3 to 1.7 oz). It is a bulky, dark furnariid with a thrush-like shape. The sexes have the same plumage. Adults of the nominate subspecies T. h. holostictus have a mostly blackish-brown face with buff streaks, some of which merge to form a supercilium. Their lores are grizzled blackish brown and buff. Their crown is blackish brown with strong buff streaks. Their back is dark brown with buff streaks and their rump dull dark brown that blends to reddish brown uppertail coverts. Their wings are rich brown and their tail dark chestnut-brown. Their throat is tawny-buff with dark feather borders that give a streaked appearance that extends onto the upper breast. The rest of their breast is medium brown with pale buff streaks, their belly similar to the lower breast but becomes unstreaked by its bottom, their flanks darker and more rufescent, and their undertail coverts darker than the belly with a reddish brown tinge. Their iris is brown to dark brown, their bill black with sometimes a lighter base to the mandible, and their legs and feet olive-brown to greenish gray. Juveniles have narrower streaks on the upperparts than adults and a mottled, rather than streaked, belly. Subspecies T. h. striatidorsus has slightly more reddish wings, more rufescent flanks, and browner edges to the throat feathers than the nominate. T. h. moderatus has more rufescent underparts with narrower streaks than the nominate; the streaks have a rufescent tinge and do not extend as far. The edges of its throat feathers are more olive than sooty.

== Distribution and habitat ==
The striped treehunter has a somewhat disjunct distribution. The nominate subspecies is found from the Andes of western Venezuela through Colombia's Eastern and Central Andes and eastern Ecuador into Peru as far as the Department of La Libertad. Subspecies T. h. striatidorsus is found from Cauca Department in Colombia's Western Andes south into western Ecuador as far as Chimborazo Province. T. h. moderatus is found in the Andes from the Department of Huánuco in Peru south and east into central Bolivia.

The striped treehunter inhabits montane evergreen forest in the subtropical zone and highly favors thickets of Chusquea bamboo, though it also occurs locally in secondary forest. It tends to stay in the undergrowth. In elevation it mostly ranges from 1,500 to 2,500 m (4,900 to 8,200 ft). In Colombia it occurs as low as 700 m (2,300 ft) and as high as 3,150 m (10,300 ft). In Ecuador it occurs as high as 3,000 m (9,800 ft).

== Behavior ==
=== Movement ===
The striped treehunter is a year-round resident throughout its range.

=== Feeding ===
The striped treehunter's diet is mostly arthropods and may also include small vertebrates. It forages in dense undergrowth, usually by itself, and only occasionally joins mixed-species feeding flocks. It gleans and probes for its prey in dead leaves and debris in the forest understory, usually within about 1 m (3.5 ft) of the ground. It might specialize in hunting in dead leaves.

=== Breeding ===
The striped treehunter's breeding season has not been fully defined but spans from at least August to November. It excavates a tunnel up to about 1 m (3.5 ft) long in an earthen bank and builds a cup nest of rootlets in the chamber at its end. The clutch size is two or three eggs. The incubation period is 14 to 17 days and fledging occurs 20 to 23 days after hatch. No details of parental care are known.

=== Vocalization ===
The striped treehunter's song is "a fast series of nasal chattering notes, slightly descending and decelerating". Its call is a sharp "kwi-di-dik".

== Status ==
The IUCN has assessed the striped treehunter as being of Least Concern. It has a large range, and though its population size is not known it is believed to be stable. No immediate threats have been identified. It is considered uncommon to locally fairly common and occurs in several protected areas.
