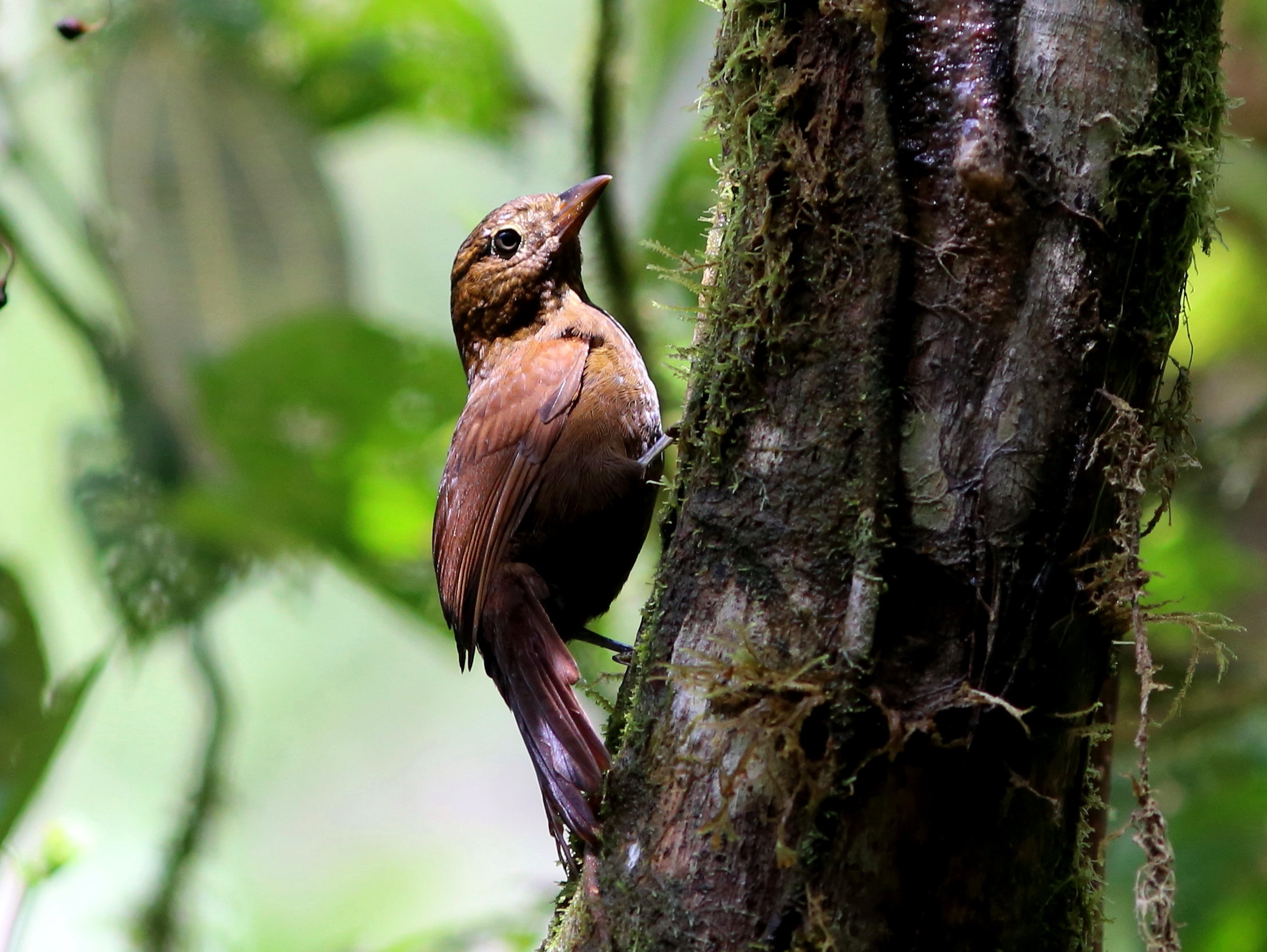

Conservation status
- Least Concern (IUCN 3.1)]

Scientific classification
- Kingdom: Animalia
- Phylum: Chordata
- Class: Aves
- Order: Passeriformes
- Family: Furnariidae
- Genus: Thripadectes
- Species: T. ignobilis

Binomial name
- Thripadectes ignobilis (Sclater, PL & Salvin, 1879)

= Uniform treehunter =

Species of bird

The uniform treehunter (Thripadectes ignobilis) is a species of bird in the Furnariinae subfamily of the ovenbird family Furnariidae. It is found in Colombia and Ecuador.

== Taxonomy and systematics ==
The uniform treehunter is a sister species of the flammulated treehunter (T. flammulatus) and Peruvian treehunter (T. scrutator). It is monotypic.

== Description ==
The uniform treehunter is 19 to 20 cm (7.5 to 7.9 in) long and weighs between 48 and 51 g (1.7 and 1.8 oz). It is the smallest, darkest, and shortest-billed member of its genus. The sexes have the same plumage. Adults have a vague narrow supercilium and wide eyering that are dull tawny-rufous, blackish brown lores grizzled with pale buff, blackish ear coverts with narrow ochraceous-buff streaks, and a dark brown malar area with lighter blurry streaks and spots. Their crown is dark brown with vague pale spots on the forehead. Their back and rump are slightly paler and redder than the crown. Their wings and tail are rich dark reddish brown. Their throat is dull dark buff with wide blurry darker streaks, their breast and belly rich dark brown with narrow buff streaks that disappear to the rear, their flanks dark reddish brown, and their undertail coverts a paler reddish brown. Their iris is dark brown, their maxilla dark brownish, their mandible blackish with a reddish horn base to dusky yellow with a dark tip, and their legs and feet greenish brown.

== Distribution and habitat ==
The uniform treehunter is found on the Pacific slope of the Andes from Colombia's Western Andes in Chocó Department south through Ecuador to El Oro Province. It inhabits montane evergreen forest and also secondary forest in the subtropical and foothill zones. In elevation it mostly ranges between 500 and 2,500 m (1,600 and 8,200 ft) in Colombia and between 1,000 and 1,700 m (3,300 and 5,600 ft) in Ecuador. In both countries it occurs locally down to 500 m (1,600 ft) and in Ecuador locally up to 2,500 m (8,200 ft).

== Behavior ==
=== Movement ===
The uniform treehunter is a year-round resident throughout its range.

=== Feeding ===
The uniform treehunter feeds on arthropods. It usually forages singly and often in mixed-species feeding flocks. It mostly forages in dense undergrowth but regularly will do so up to the forest's mid-story and above. It forages along branches to glean prey from them, debris, and dead leaves.

=== Breeding ===
The uniform treehunter's nesting season has not been fully described but spans at least June to September. It is thought to be monogamous. It nests in a tunnel in an earthen bank. Nothing else is known about its breeding biology.

=== Vocalization ===
The uniform treehunter's song is a rather high-pitched "series of 6-8 sharp 'kik' or 'kyip' notes".

== Status ==
The IUCN has assessed the uniform treehunter as being of Least Concern. It has a restricted range and an unknown population size that is believed to be stable. No immediate threats have been identified. It is considered uncommon to locally fairly common and occurs in two protected areas in Colombia.
