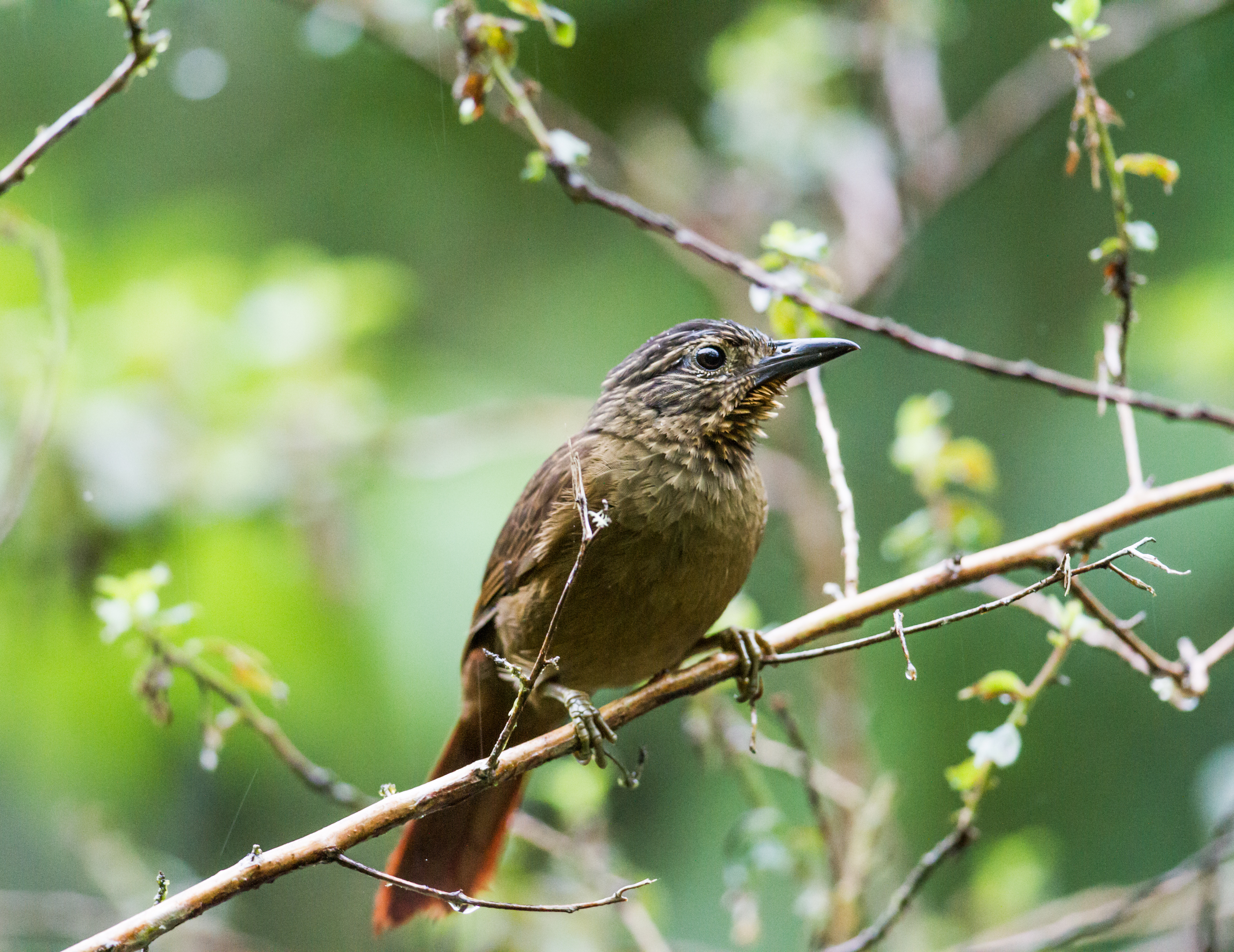
- Thripadectes melanorhynchus - Black-billed Treehunter (Song)

Conservation status
- Least Concern (IUCN 3.1)

Scientific classification
- Kingdom: Animalia
- Phylum: Chordata
- Class: Aves
- Order: Passeriformes
- Family: Furnariidae
- Genus: Thripadectes
- Species: T. melanorhynchus

Binomial name
- Thripadectes melanorhynchus (Tschudi, 1844)

= Black-billed treehunter =

Species of bird

The black-billed treehunter (Thripadectes melanorhynchus) is a species of bird in the Furnariinae subfamily of the ovenbird family Furnariidae. It is found in Colombia, Ecuador, and Peru.

== Taxonomy and systematics ==
The black-billed treehunter has two subspecies, the nominate T. m. melanorhynchus (Tschudi, 1844) and T. m. striaticeps (Sclater & Salvin, 1875). It and the streak-breasted treehunter (T. rufobrunneus) are sister species.

== Description ==
The black-billed treehunter is 20 to 20.5 cm (7.9 to 8.1 in) long and weighs 39 to 46 g (1.4 to 1.6 oz). It is a bulky, dark furnariid with a thrush-like shape. The sexes have the same plumage. Adults of the nominate subspecies have a mostly blackish-brown face with well-defined buff streaks and lores that are grizzled blackish brown and buff. Their crown is blackish brown with narrow buff streaks. Their back is dark brown with buff streaks and their rump dull dark brown that blends to reddish brown uppertail coverts. Their wings are rich dark brown and their tail dark chestnut-brown. Their throat is ochraceous with dark feather borders that give a scaly appearance. Their breast is rufescent-brown with faint pale streaks, their belly a mostly plain duller rufescent brown, and their flanks and undertail coverts darker rufescent-brown. Their iris is brown to dark brown, their bill black, and their legs and feet dark blackish gray to brown. Juveniles have less distinct streaking on the back and throat than adults. Subspecies T. m. striaticeps has a paler (less sooty) crown and back than the nominate, with wider streaks on the back and more rufescent wings.

== Distribution and habitat ==
The nominate subspecies of the black-billed treehunter has the larger range. It is found on the east slope of the Andes from Sucumbíos Province in northern Ecuador south all the way through Peru to the Department of Puno. Subspecies T. m. striaticeps is found on the eastern slope of Colombia's Eastern Andes south from Boyacá and Casanare departments to near or into northern Ecuador. The species primarily inhabits montane evergreen forest and also occurs in secondary forest and in stunted forest along ridgetops. In elevation it ranges between 1,000 and 1,800 m (3,300 and 5,900 ft) in Colombia and 1,000 and 1,700 m (3,300 and 5,600 ft) in Ecuador and Peru.

== Behavior ==
=== Movement ===
The black-billed treehunter is a year-round resident throughout its range.

=== Feeding ===
The black-billed treehunter's diet is mostly arthropods and may also include small vertebrates. It forages in dense undergrowth, usually by itself, and rarely joins mixed-species feeding flocks. It gleans its prey but the substrates from which it does so have not been fully defined.

=== Breeding ===
The black-billed treehunter's breeding season has not been defined but spans at least from October to April. It is thought to be monogamous. It excavates a tunnel up to 1 m (3.5 ft) long in an earthen bank with a chamber at the end that it floors with leaf stems and sometimes thin sticks. The one known clutch was of three eggs. The incubation period and time to fledging are not known. Both parents provision nestlings.

=== Vocalization ===
The black-billed treehunter's song is "an accelerating, then decelerating, slightly descending series of c. 10–13 sharp 'kyip' notes with [a] 'laughing' quality". The notes are sometimes paired.

== Status ==
The IUCN has assessed the black-billed treehunter as being of Least Concern. It has a large range, and though its population size is not known it is believed to be stable. No immediate threats have been identified. It is considered uncommon to locally fairly common and occurs in several protected areas.
