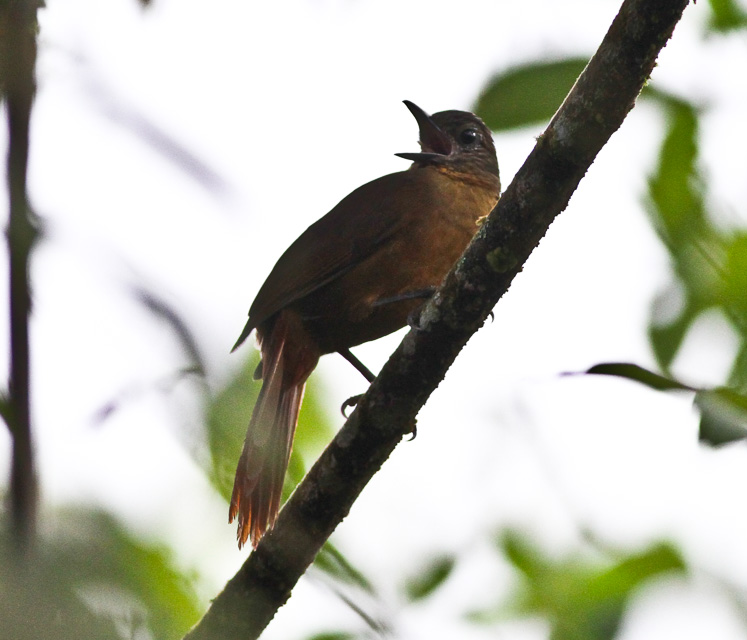

Conservation status
- Least Concern (IUCN 3.1)

Scientific classification
- Kingdom: Animalia
- Phylum: Chordata
- Class: Aves
- Order: Passeriformes
- Family: Furnariidae
- Genus: Thripadectes
- Species: T. virgaticeps

Binomial name
- Thripadectes virgaticeps Lawrence, 1874

= Streak-capped treehunter =

Species of bird

The streak-capped treehunter (Thripadectes virgaticeps) is a species of bird in the Furnariinae subfamily of the ovenbird family Furnariidae. It is found in Colombia, Ecuador, and Venezuela.

== Taxonomy and systematics ==
The streak-capped treehunter has these six subspecies:

- T. v. klagesi (Hellmayr & Seilern, 1912)
- T. v. tachirensis Phelps, WH & Phelps, WH Jr, 1958
- T. v. magdalenae Meyer de Schauensee, 1945
- T. v. sclateri Berlepsch, 1907
- T. v. virgaticeps Lawrence, 1874
- T. v. sumaco Chapman, 1925

These subspecies are open to some dispute. Some of them apparently intergrade, and the subspecies in Colombia and Ecuador are "in need of re-evaluation".

== Description ==
The streak-capped treehunter is 21 to 23 cm (8.3 to 9.1 in) long and weighs 61 to 65 g (2.2 to 2.3 oz). It is one of the larger members of its genus and has the least amount of streaking. The sexes have the same plumage. Adults of the nominate subspecies T. v. virgaticeps have a mostly blackish-brown face with buff streaks and a tawny-buff malar area. Their lores are grizzled blackish brown and grayish buff. Their crown is blackish brown with dull buff spots on the forehead that become streaks on the crown itself. They have an indistinct dark brown collar with faint buff streaks. Their back is rich dark brown with a few buff streaks on its upper part; the back color blends to a slightly redder rump and reddish brown uppertail coverts. Their wings are rich rufescent brown and their tail dark chestnut-brown. Their throat is tawny-buff with dark feather borders that give a streaked appearance that widens as it extends onto the upper breast and then narrows again. The rest of their breast and their belly are rich rufescent brown, their flanks darker, and their undertail coverts dark reddish brown. Their iris is dark brown, their bill black, and their legs and feet greenish gray to blackish. Juveniles have an almost unstreaked throat.

Subspecies T. v. sumaco's crown streaks continue onto its nape; its bill is much shorter than the nominate's and its wing coverts, flight feathers, and underparts are less rufous. T. v. sclateri has a more olive (less rufous) back and is paler and less rufous on the rump than the nominate. T. v. magdalenae has slightly less olive upperparts than sclateri, with a shorter bill, less obvious throat markings, and brighter more golden underparts. T. v. klagesi has a grayer crown with more conspicuous streaks than the nominate, with a much shorter bill, a slightly paler back, a lighter rufuous rump and tail, and a throat more heavily marked with blackish. T. v. tachirensis has a more brownish back than kalgesi, with a darker and less reddish rump and uppertail coverts, darker and more ochraceous underparts, and a dusky wash on the breast.

== Distribution and habitat ==
The streak-capped treehunter has a disjunct distribution. The subspecies are found thus:

- T. v. klagesi: the Venezuelan Coastal Range between Carabobo state and the Capital District
- T. v. tachirensis: Andes of western Venezuela in Lara and Táchira states
- T. v. magdalenae: Colombia's Western Andes in Chocó Department, the eastern slope of the Central Andes in Antioquia and Huila departments, and the Eastern Andes in Santander Department
- T. v. sclateri: Colombia's Western Andes between the departments of Valle del Cauca and Nariño
- T. v. virgaticeps: Andes in northwestern Ecuador between Carchi and Pichincha provinces
- T. v. sumaco: Eastern Andes of southern Colombia in Caquetá and Nariño departments and separately in Ecuador's Napo Province

The streak-capped treehunter mostly inhabits montane evergreen forest in the subtropical zone, though it also occurs locally in secondary forest. It tends to stay in the undergrowth. In elevation it mostly ranges from 1,300 to 2,100 m (4,300 to 6,900 ft). In Colombia it occurs as low as 1,200 m (3,900 ft) and as high as 2,500 m (8,200 ft).

== Behavior ==
=== Movement ===
The streak-capped treehunter is a year-round resident throughout its range.

=== Feeding ===
The streak-capped treehunter's diet is mostly arthropods and may also include small vertebrates. It forages in dense undergrowth, usually by itself or in pairs, and only occasionally joins mixed-species feeding flocks. It gleans and probes for its prey along mossy branches and in debris caught in the undergrowth.

=== Breeding ===
The streak-capped treehunter's breeding season has not been fully defined but spans from at least April to December overall. It is thought to be monogamous. It excavates a tunnel up to about 1 m (3.5 ft) long in an earthen bank and builds a cup nest of rootlets in the chamber at its end. The only known clutch was of two eggs. The incubation period and time to fledging are not known. Both parents provision the nestlings.

=== Vocalization ===
The streak-capped treehunter's song is "a short and evenly pitched series of emphatic and well-enunciated notes, 'chup, cheyp-cheyp-cheyp-cheyp-cheyp' ". Its call is "a fast, sharp 'ch-di-dit', 'chi-dik' or 'ju-dut', repeated at intervals of several seconds". It also makes "a nasal 'jwick' " alarm call.

== Status ==
The IUCN has assessed the streak-capped treehunter as being of Least Concern. It has a somewhat limited range, and though its population size is not known it is believed to be stable. No immediate threats have been identified. It is considered uncommon to fairly common and occurs in at least one protected area in each of Venezuela and Colombia.
