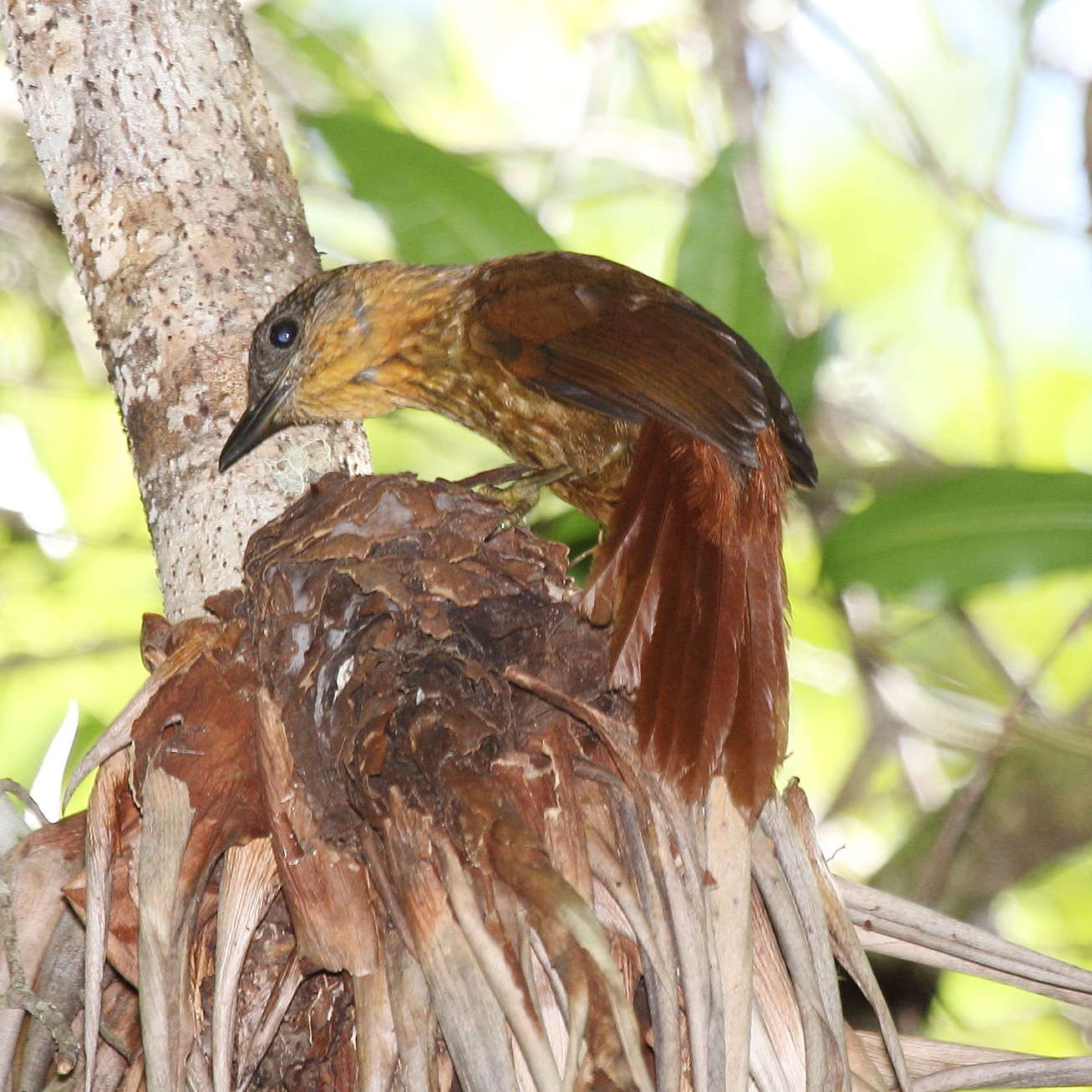

Conservation status
- Least Concern (IUCN 3.1)

Scientific classification
- Kingdom: Animalia
- Phylum: Chordata
- Class: Aves
- Order: Passeriformes
- Family: Furnariidae
- Genus: Thripadectes
- Species: T. rufobrunneus

Binomial name
- Thripadectes rufobrunneus (Lawrence, 1865)

Synonyms
- Philydor rufobrunneus (protonym)

= Streak-breasted treehunter =

Species of bird

The streak-breasted treehunter (Thripadectes rufobrunneus) is a passerine bird in the Furnariinae subfamily of the ovenbird family Furnariidae. It is found in Costa Rica and Panama.

== Taxonomy and systematics ==
The streak-breasted treehunter was formally described in 1865 by the American amateur ornithologist George Newbold Lawrence from a specimen collected by Alexander von Frantzius near San José in Costa Rica. Lawrence coined the binomial name Philydor rufobrunneus. The specific epithet rufobrunneus is Modern Latin meaning "brown". The streak-breasted treehunter is now placed in the genus Thripadectes that was introduced in 1862 by Philip Sclater.

The streak-breasted treehunter is monotypic: no subspecies are recognised. It and the black-billed treehunter (T. melanorhynchus) form a superspecies.

== Description ==
The streak-breasted treehunter is 20 to 22 cm (7.9 to 8.7 in) long and weighs 48 to 54 g (1.7 to 1.9 oz). It is a large, dark furnariid with a thrush-like shape. The sexes have the same plumage. Adults have a mostly dark brown face with dull rufescence on their ear coverts and a dark ochraceous malar area with dark flecks. Their crown is blackish with long olive streaks. They have an indistinct olive collar that becomes rufous on the sides of their neck. Their back and rump are rich dark brown that becomes dark reddish brown on their uppertail coverts. Their wings are rich dark brown with slightly darker primary coverts. Their tail is rich chestnut-brown. Their throat is dull ochraceous with a darker lower border; their breast and belly are brown with narrow ochraceous streaks that vanish into the lower belly. Their flanks are rich dark brown and their undertail coverts are dark reddish brown with vague chestnut streaks. Their iris is dark brown, their bill black with sometimes a grayish base to the mandible, and their legs and feet dark brownish gray to greenish gray. Juveniles have paler and less distinct streaking on the upper breast than adults.

== Distribution and habitat ==
The streak-breasted treehunter is found in the Talamancan montane forests through most of Costa Rica and into Panama as far as Veraguas Province. It also occurs in mature secondary forest. It particularly favors ravines with streams and large numbers of epiphytes. In elevation it ranges between 700 and 3,000 m (2,300 and 9,800 ft) but is most common in Costa Rica between 1,200 and 2,500 m (3,900 and 8,200 ft).

== Behavior ==
=== Movement ===
The streak-breasted treehunter is a year-round resident throughout its range.

=== Feeding ===
The streak-breasted treehunter's diet is arthropods, such as insects and spiders, and small vertebrates such as frogs and salamanders. It forages in dense undergrowth and is usually by itself though occasionally in pairs. It very rarely joins mixed-species feeding flocks. It gleans its prey from dead leaves, moss, debris, and epiphytes while hopping and clambering among branches; it also rips apart clusters of dead leaves to reach prey. It sometimes hangs upside down to feed.

=== Breeding ===
The streak-breasted treehunter's breeding season spans from February to August. It excavates a tunnel up to 70 cm (28 in) long in an earthen bank with a chamber at the end that it floors with leaf stems and rootlets. The clutch size is two eggs. The incubation period and time to fledging are not known. Males are known to incubate the eggs and both parents provision nestlings.

=== Vocalization ===
One version of the streak-breasted treehunter's song is "a scratchy che-brah, che-brah, che-brah... with a scolding quality". Another is "a series of rolling, burry 'chi-wówr' notes". Its calls include "a harsh, grating 'zeck' or 'tseck' or 'cheyt, cheyt' [and a] doubled 'rek-rek' ".

== Status ==
The IUCN has assessed the streak-breasted treehunter as being of Least Concern. It has a fairly limited range but its estimated population of between 20,000 and 50,000 mature individuals is believed to be stable. No immediate threats have been identified. It is considered uncommon to locally fairly common and tolerates some forest fragmentation.
