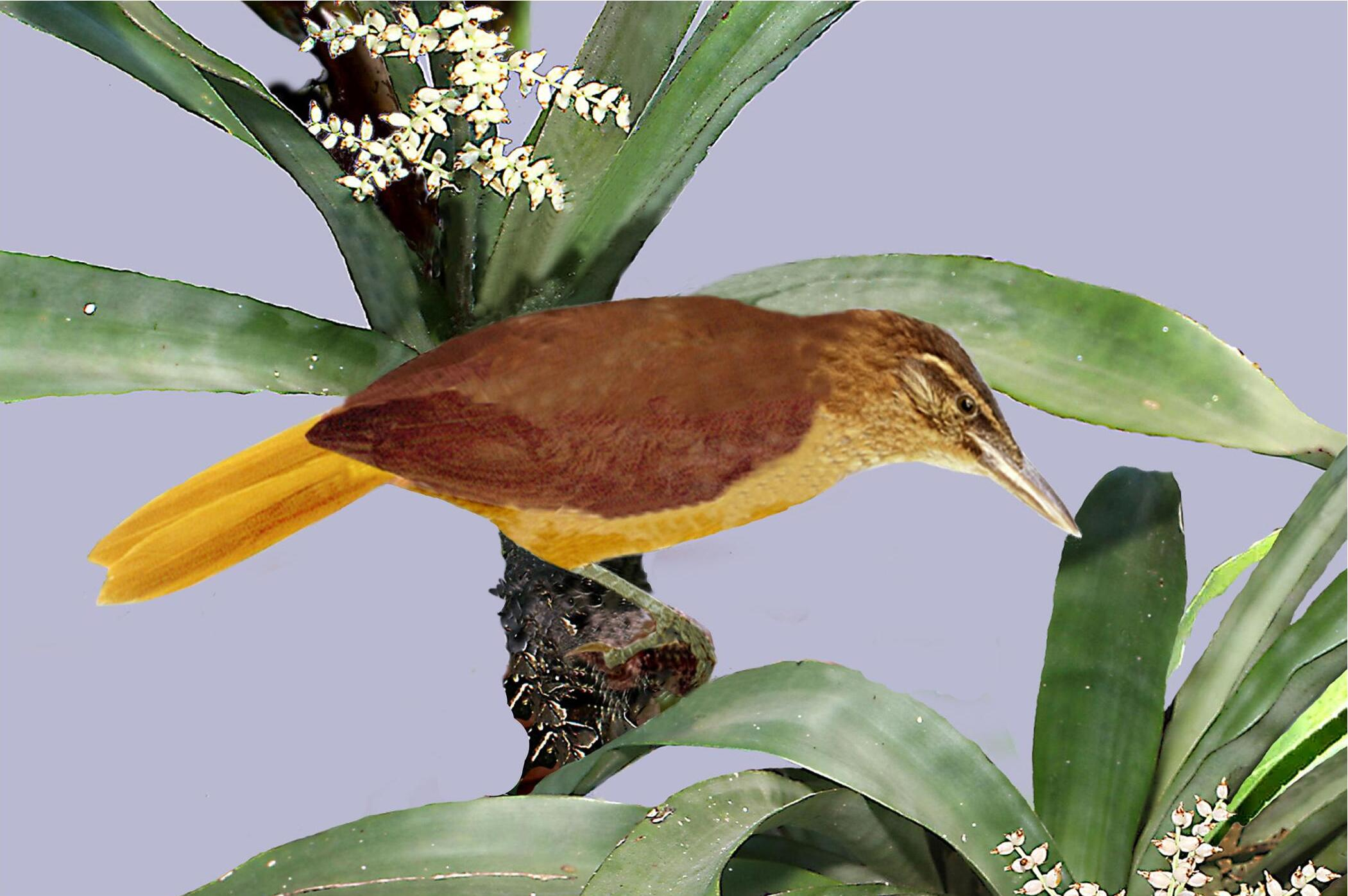

Conservation status
- Extinct (IUCN 3.1)

Scientific classification
- Kingdom: Animalia
- Phylum: Chordata
- Class: Aves
- Order: Passeriformes
- Family: Furnariidae
- Genus: Cichlocolaptes
- Species: †C. mazarbarnetti

Binomial name
- †Cichlocolaptes mazarbarnetti Buzzetti, 2014

= Cryptic treehunter =

Species of bird

The cryptic treehunter (Cichlocolaptes mazarbarnetti) is an extinct species of bird in the Furnariinae subfamily of the ovenbird family Furnariidae. Its status, and even its existence as a species, are disputed. It is or was endemic to Brazil.

== Taxonomy and systematics ==
The cryptic treehunter was described from a specimen collected in 1986 that originally had been identified as an Alagoas foliage-gleaner (Philydor novaesi). Though it appears visually very similar to the Alagoas foliage-gleaner, its morphology places it in genus Cichlocolaptes. It is known only from two specimens, the adult female from which it was described and a juvenile female.

The IUCN has declared the cryptic treehunter to be extinct. The International Ornithological Committee (IOC) and the Clements taxonomy had accepted it as a species but did not note it as being extinct. In January 2024 the IOC accepted it as extinct; as of that date the most recent Clements taxonomy had not. The South American Classification Committee of the American Ornithological Society declined to recognize it as a species but acknowledges the lack of consensus.

For convenience the rest of this article uses the present tense instead of "is or was" and "has or had".

== Description ==
The two specimens of the cryptic treehunter are 20.7 cm (8.1 in) and 22.1 cm (8.7 in) long. When collected the adult female weighed 48 g (1.7 oz) and the juvenile 36 g (1.3 oz). The species has a heavy dagger-like bill. The adult female has a mostly pinkish buff face with some dusky streaks. Its forehead and crown are black and its nape, back, rump, and uppertail coverts are cinnamon-brown. Its tail is pale orange-rufous that is darker on the central feathers. Its wings are mostly brown with cream edges on the flight feathers. Its throat is pinkish buff, the sides of its neck cinnamon-brown, its breast and belly cinnamon, and its flanks and undertail coverts a browner cinnamon. Its iris is brown, its maxilla black, its mandible paler, and its legs and feet grayish olive.

== Distribution and habitat ==
The cryptic treehunter has only been recorded at two sites in northeastern Brazil, the Murici Ecological Station in Alagoas and the private preserve RPPN Frei Caneca in Pernambuco. The habitat at the sites is humid forest on hilly terrain with many vine tangles, bromeliads, and mosses. The individuals were observed between the mid-storey and subcanopy. The sites are between 500 and 600 m (1,600 and 2,000 ft) above sea level.

== Behavior ==
Virtually nothing is known about the cryptic treehunter's behavior, though it is thought to be similar to that of its congener, the pale-browed treehunter (C. leucophrus).

=== Vocalization ===
The cryptic treehunter's songs were recorded by the Mazar Burnett/Buzzetti team that described it as a species. Others had also recorded it prior to 2007 and retroactively assigned the recordings to the species. One song is "a fast, dry rattle of 9–62 notes...followed closely by 4–8 loud, raspy notes at a regular pace...increasing slightly in frequency before decreasing suddenly at the end". In the second, the initial rattle lasts longer and is followed by one to three raspy notes. "Calls in response to playback are a fast, staccato series of three dry notes that ascend then descend."

== Status ==
The IUCN assessed the cryptic treehunter as Critically Endangered in 2016 and 2017 and then in 2019 declared it Extinct. A 2018 study citing bird extinction patterns, and the lack of any confirmed sightings since 2007 despite much searching, suggest that it went extinct earlier. "Extensive habitat loss has occurred in the region, and the remaining fragments are small and isolated." The Atlantic Forest has mostly been cleared by logging and conversion for grazing and sugar cane production. The specimens were collected in nominally protected areas, but Murici remains under pressure from illegal logging and hunting. The remaining patches of habitat are small and have lost much of their epiphytes, apparently because drying winds can penetrate the forest patches.
