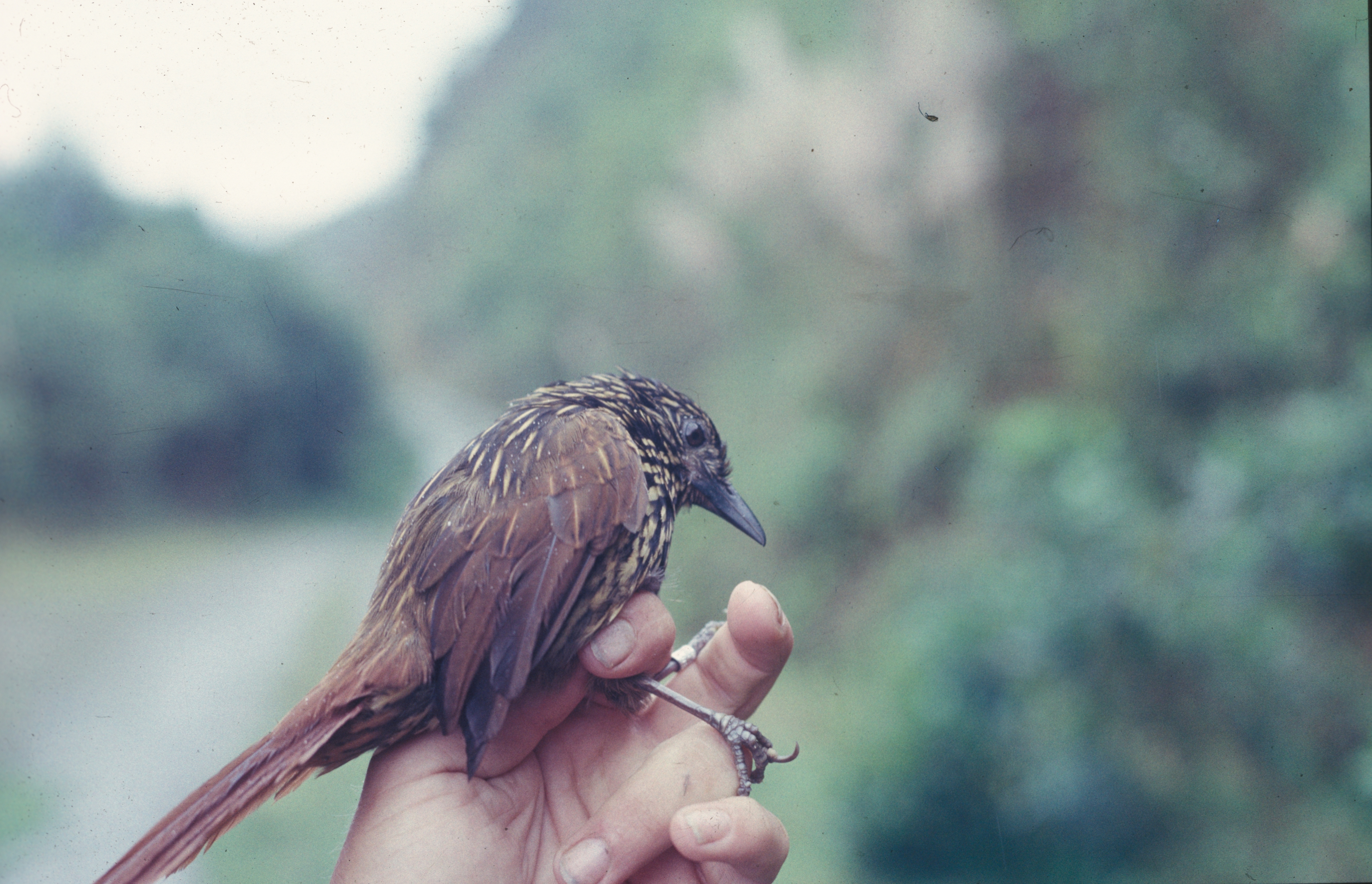

Conservation status
- Least Concern (IUCN 3.1)

Scientific classification
- Kingdom: Animalia
- Phylum: Chordata
- Class: Aves
- Order: Passeriformes
- Family: Furnariidae
- Genus: Thripadectes
- Species: T. flammulatus

Binomial name
- Thripadectes flammulatus (Eyton, 1849)

= Flammulated treehunter =

Species of bird

The flammulated treehunter (Thripadectes flammulatus) is a species of bird in the Furnariinae subfamily of the ovenbird family Furnariidae. It is found in Colombia, Ecuador, Peru, and Venezuela.

== Taxonomy and systematics ==
The flammulated treehunter is a sister species of the uniform treehunter (T. ignobilis) and Peruvian treehunter (T. scrutator). It has two subspecies, the nominate T. f. flammulatus (Eyton, 1849) and T. f. bricenoi (Berlepsch, 1907).

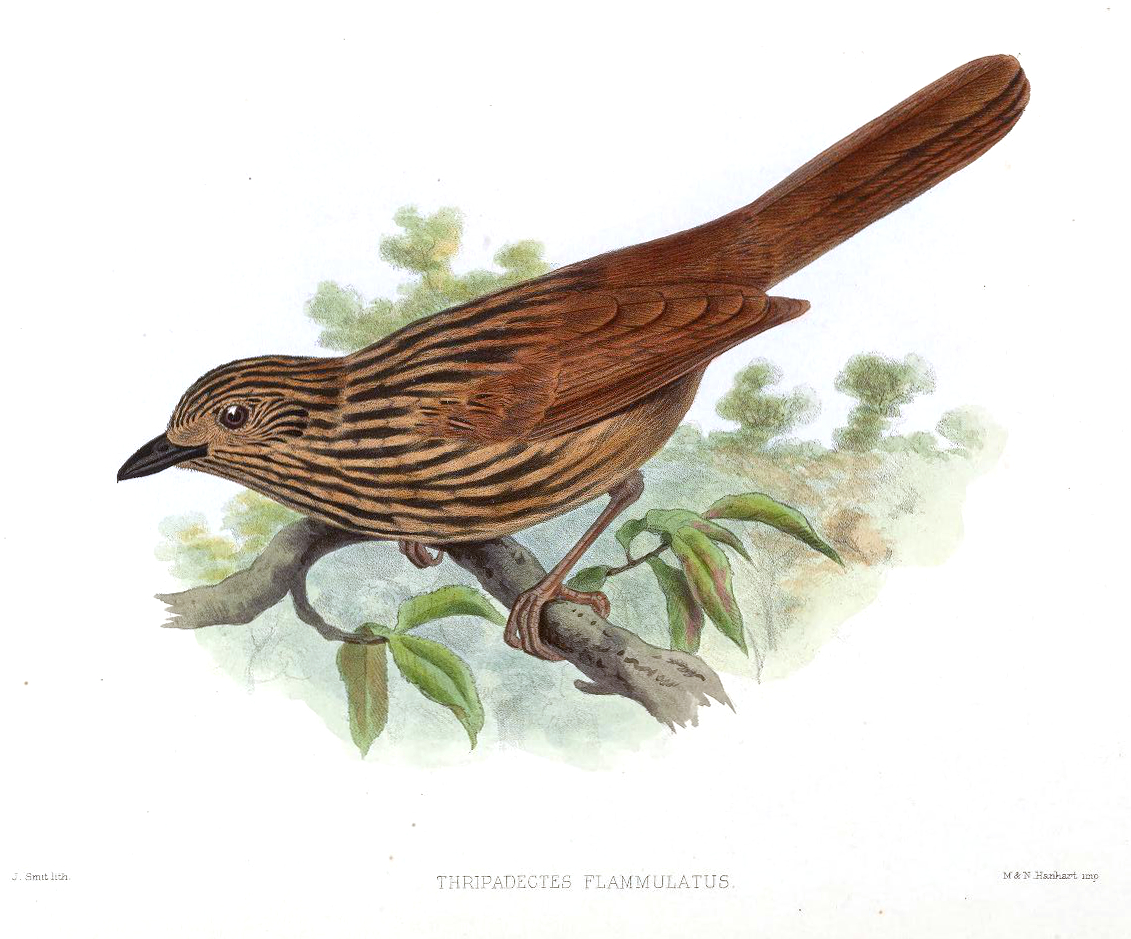
Illustration by Joseph Smit, 1869

== Description ==
The flammulated treehunter is 24 to 25 cm (9.4 to 9.8 in) long and weighs 50 to 62 g (1.8 to 2.2 oz). It is the largest and most strikingly patterned member of its genus. The sexes have the same plumage. Adults of the nominate subspecies have a blackish face and crown with sharp tawny-buff streaks that are rather golden on the crown. Their lores are speckled with blackish and golden buff. Their back is browner than the face and crown, with its blackish only along the feather shafts, and it blends to the rich medium brown rump. Their uppertail coverts are dark reddish brown. Their wing coverts are more rufescent than the back and with narrower streaks, their flight feathers dark rufescent brown, and their tail dull chestnut-brown. Their throat, breast, and upper belly are streaked with blackish and golden buff that fade to rich brown on the lower belly and flanks. Their undertail coverts are streaked with dark rufous-brown and blackish. Their iris is brown to dark brown, their bill black, and their legs and feet blackish to gray-brown. Juveniles are less distinctly streaked than adults. Subspecies T. f. bricenoi is overall paler than the nominate, with wider and blacker streaks on the upperwing coverts, an almost uniform buff throat, olive-brown instead of black streaks on the underparts, and ochraceous undertail coverts.

== Distribution and habitat ==
The flammulated treehunter has a disjunct distribution. The nominate subspecies is found in the Andes of southwestern Venezuela, Colombia's Sierra Nevada de Santa Marta, intermittently in all three Colombian Andes ranges, and more or less continuously south through Ecuador's Andes into extreme northern Peru. Subspecies T. f. bricenoi is found in the Andes of western Venezuela's Mérida state. The species inhabits montane evergreen forest and temperate forest and favors thickets of Chusquea bamboo. In elevation it mostly ranges between 2,200 and 3,500 m (7,200 and 11,500 ft) but locally occurs as low as 700 m (2,300 ft) in western Colombia.

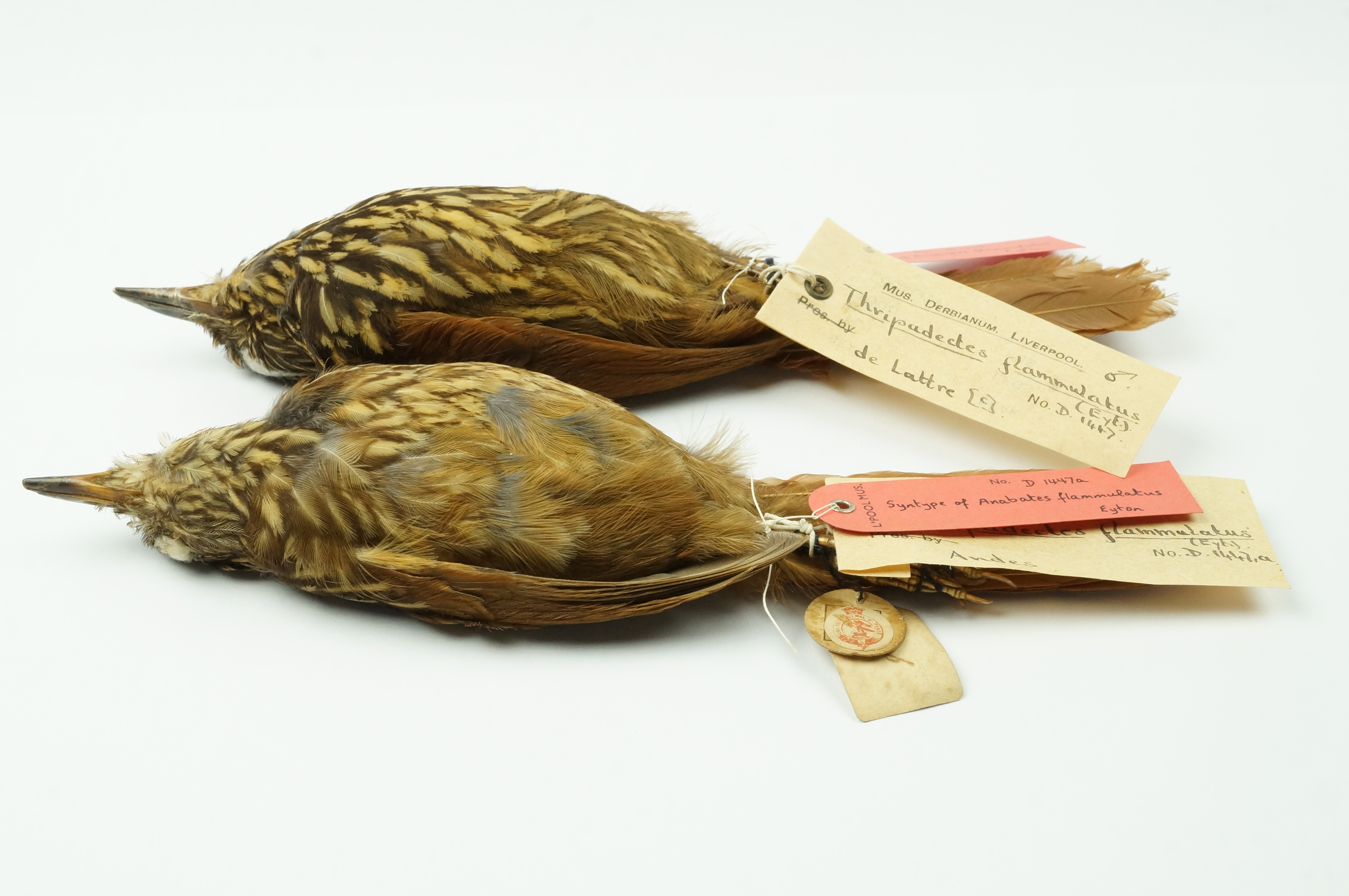
Syntypes of Anabates flammulatus Eyton (NML-VZ D1447, NML-VZ D1447a) held at World Museum, National Museums Liverpool.

== Behavior ==
=== Movement ===
The flammulated treehunter is a year-round resident throughout its range.

=== Feeding ===
The flammulated treehunter feeds on arthropods and is suspected to also eat small vertebrates. It usually forages singly and rarely to occasionally joins mixed-species feeding flocks. It mostly forages in dense undergrowth, where it gleans prey from branches, moss, and debris.

=== Breeding ===
The flammulated treehunter's breeding season has not been fully defined but includes at least June to October. It excavates a tunnel in an earthen bank and makes a nest of rootlets, bamboo fibers, and other plant material in a chamber at its end. The two known clutches were each of two eggs. The incubation period and time to fledging are not known. Both parents provision nestlings.

=== Vocalization ===
The flammulated treehunter's song is "a series of grating notes that start as a stutter, then accelerates and becomes louder". Its contact call is "an emphatic sharp 'check' ".

== Status ==
The IUCN has assessed the flammulated treehunter as being of Least Concern. It has a large range and an unknown population size that is believed to be stable. No immediate threats have been identified. It is considered generally uncommon; it occurs in two protected areas in Ecuador.
