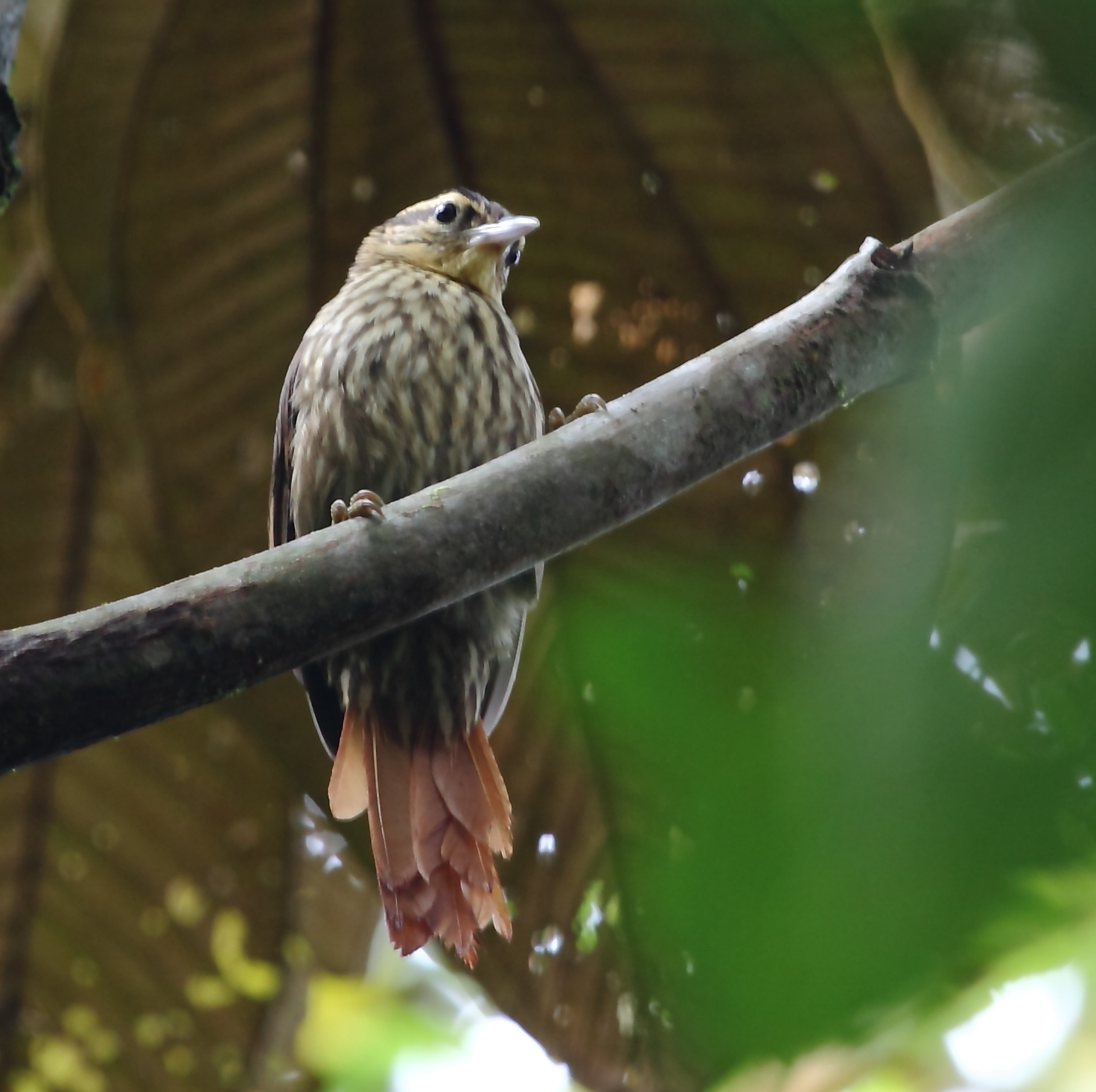
- At São Luiz do Paraitinga, São Paulo State, Brazil

Conservation status
- Least Concern (IUCN 3.1)

- Least Concern (IUCN 3.1)(See Taxonomy and Status sections)

Scientific classification
- Kingdom: Animalia
- Phylum: Chordata
- Class: Aves
- Order: Passeriformes
- Family: Furnariidae
- Genus: Cichlocolaptes
- Species: C. leucophrus

Binomial name
- Cichlocolaptes leucophrus (Jardine & Selby, 1830)

Synonyms
- Anabates leucophrus Jardine & Selby, 1830

= Pale-browed treehunter =

Species of bird

The pale-browed treehunter (Cichlocolaptes leucophrus) is a species of bird in the Furnariinae subfamily of the ovenbird family Furnariidae. It is endemic to Brazil.

== Taxonomy and systematics ==
The pale-browed treehunter's taxonomy is unsettled. The South American Classification Committee of the American Ornithological Society, the International Ornithological Committee, and the Clements taxonomy treat it as a species with two subspecies, the nominate C. l. leucophrus (Jardine & Selby, 1830) and C. l. holti (Pinto, 1941). BirdLife International's Handbook of the Birds of the World (HBW) treats the two taxa as separate species, the large and small pale-browed treehunters respectively.

The pale-browed treehunter shares genus Cichlocolaptes with the cryptic treehunter (C. mazarbarnetti), which is believed to be extinct.

This article follows the one-species two-subspecies model.

== Description ==
The nominate subspecies of the pale-browed treehunter is about 22 cm (8.7 in) long; subspecies C. l. holti is about 18 cm (7.1 in) long. Both subspecies have a long dagger-like bill, and male and female plumages are alike. Adults of the nominate subspecies have a buffish white supercilium, blackish and dull buff lores, and a dark brown band behind the eye on an otherwise duff buff face. Their crown is dark brown whose feathers have obvious buff to rusty-buff shafts. They have an indistinct blackish brown collar with buff streaks. Their back is rufescent brown with long blurry buff streaks and their rump and uppertail coverts are a slightly paler brown with indistinct buff streaks. Their tail is pale rufous or cinnamon. Their wing coverts are brown with indistinct buff streaks and their flight feathers rich brown. Their throat is pale yellowish buff, their breast has strong pale buff and brown streaks, and their belly, flanks, and undertail coverts are like the breast with the streaks progressively fading. Their iris is very dark, their maxilla dusky gray, their mandible a paler brown with gray towards the tip, and their legs and feet variable from greenish gray to pale brownish. Juveniles are much like adults but with less distinct streaking on their underparts. Compared to the nominate subspecies, C. l. holti is smaller, has a wider and paler supercilium, blacker feathers in the crown, slightly more olive upperparts, a darker rufous tail, and a plain buff throat.

== Distribution and habitat ==
The pale-browed treehunter is found in southeastern Brazil. The nominate subspecies occurs from southern Bahia south to Rio de Janeiro state. C. l. holti occurs from São Paulo state south to northeastern Rio Grande do Sul. The species inhabits humid lowland and montane evergreen forest. The nominate subspecies occurs from sea level to 1,500 m (4,900 ft) while C. l. holti reaches only about 1,000 m (3,300 ft).

== Behavior ==
=== Movement ===
The pale-browed treehunter is a year-round resident throughout its range.

=== Feeding ===
The pale-browed treehunter feeds on arthropods. It often, and perhaps usually, forages as a member of a mixed-species feeding flock. It feeds at any level of the forest between its understory and the subcanopy. It forages along larger limbs and branches, probing and gleaning for prey, with a strong preference for seeking it in bromeliads and other epiphytes. It sometimes goes completely into clumps of bromeliads and may hang upside-down to feed.

=== Breeding ===
Nothing is known about the pale-browed treehunter's breeding biology.

=== Vocalization ===
The songs of the two subspecies of pale-browed treehunter differ slightly in pitch. In general, they are "loud, ringing 'reep' notes, variable in number, sometimes interspersed with fast chattering notes". Their call is "a loud 'krip, shrip' ".

== Status ==
The IUCN follows HBW taxonomy and so has separately assessed the "large" and "small" pale-browed treehunters. The assessements are the same: Both taxa are of Least Concern. They have large ranges and unknown population sizes that are believed to be decreasing. No immediate threats to either have been identified. Both subspecies are considered rare to locally common and each is found in several protected areas. The Atlantic Forest has undergone extensive clearing, leaving little suitable habitat for them.
