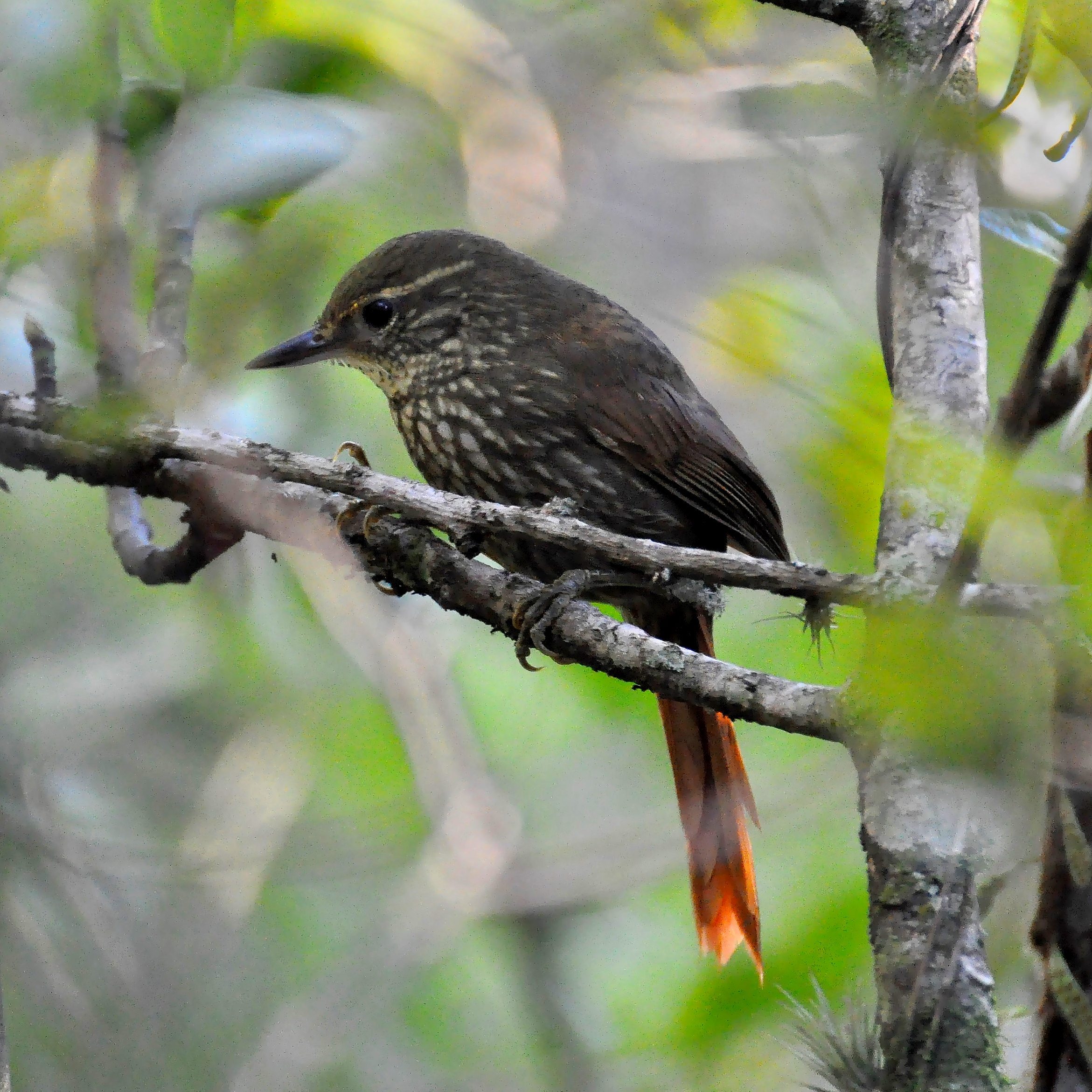

Conservation status
- Least Concern (IUCN 3.1)

Scientific classification
- Kingdom: Animalia
- Phylum: Chordata
- Class: Aves
- Order: Passeriformes
- Family: Furnariidae
- Genus: Syndactyla
- Species: S. rufosuperciliata

Binomial name
- Syndactyla rufosuperciliata (Lafresnaye, 1832)

= Buff-browed foliage-gleaner =

Species of bird

The buff-browed foliage-gleaner (Syndactyla rufosuperciliata) is a species of bird in the Furnariinae subfamily of the ovenbird family Furnariidae. It is found in Argentina, Bolivia, Brazil, Ecuador, Paraguay, Peru, and Uruguay.

== Taxonomy and systematics ==
The buff-browed foliage-gleaner's taxonomy is unsettled. The International Ornithological Committee and BirdLife International's Handbook of the Birds of the World recognize these four subspecies:

- S. r. cabanisi (Taczanowski, 1875)
- S. r. oleaginea (Sclater, PL, 1884)
- S. r. rufosuperciliata (Lafresnaye, 1832)
- S. r. acrita (Oberholser, 1901)

The Clements taxonomy adds a fifth, S. r. similis (Chapman, 1927) that the other two systems include within S. r. cabanisi. This article follows the four-subspecies model.

DNA sequencing data identified two major genetic groups: one in the Andes (subspecies S. r. cabanisi and S. r. oleaginea), and the other in the Atlantic Forest (subspecies S. r. rufosuperciliata and S. r. acrita), suggesting that they might be treated as two separate species. In the Atlantic Forest, subspecies S. r. rufosuperciliata and S. r. acrita were genetically differentiated, but in the Andes, genetic variation did not correspond with subspecies limits.

== Description ==
The buff-browed foliage-gleaner is 17 to 18 cm (6.7 to 7.1 in) long and weighs 22 to 33 g (0.78 to 1.2 oz). It is a medium-sized furnariid with a thick, slightly upcurved, bill. The sexes have the same plumage. Adults of the nominate subspecies S. r. rufosuperciliata have a tawny-buff eye ring and a lighter supercilium that extends to the nape; the rest of their face is brownish with small buff markings. Their crown is dull olive-brown with vague whitish streaks at the rear, and their back, rump, and uppertail coverts are plain olive-brown. Their tail is dull rufous and their wings are rich olivaceous brown. Their throat is whitish with some brownish feather tips, their breast buffy whitish with olive-brown feather edges that give a scalloped appearance, their belly olive-brownish with wide blurry buffy-whitish streaks that disappear towards the rear, their flanks a darker olive-brownish with fewer streaks, and their undertail coverts olive-brownish with ochraceous-tinged streaks. Their iris is brown to dark brown, their maxilla brown to black, their mandible whitish to blue-gray, and their legs and feet olive to brownish gray. Juveniles are similar to adults but have spotted rather than streaked underparts.

Subspecies S. r. acrita has a slightly paler supercilium than the nominate, browner and more olivaceous upperparts, a more chestnut tail, and more prominent streaking on the belly. S. r. oleaginea has more olivaceous brown underparts than the nominate, and the underparts' streaks are thinner and longer. S. r. cabanisi compared to the nominate has a richer ochraceous supercilium, a darker crown, a richer brown back, a chestnut wash on the uppertail coverts, a more buff-tinged throat, and richer more ochraceous underparts with tawny-buff streaking.

== Distribution and habitat ==
The buff-browed foliage-gleaner has a disjunct distribution, with two widely separated ranges. The subspecies are found thus:

- S. r. cabanisi: from extreme southern Ecuador's Cordillera del Cóndor south on the east slope of the Andes through Peru into Bolivia
- S. r. oleaginea: Andes from central Bolivia south into northwestern Argentina as far as La Rioja Province
- S. r. rufosuperciliata: southeastern Brazil from Minas Gerais and Espírito Santo south to Paraná
- S. r. acrita: north-central Paraguay, far southeastern Brazil's Santa Catarina and Rio Grande do Sul states, Uruguay, and northeastern Argentina south to Buenos Aires Province

The Andean populations of the buff-browed foliage-gleaner inhabit montane evergreen forest and mature secondary forest, often with Chusquea bamboo, at elevations ranging between 1,300 and 2,500 m (4,300 and 8,200 ft), but in Bolivia, it occurs locally down to 1,000 m (3,300 ft). The southeastern populations inhabit lowland tropical evergreen forest, gallery forest, and secondary forest at elevations up to 2,000 m (6,600 ft).

== Behavior ==
=== Movement ===
The buff-browed foliage-gleaner is a year-round resident throughout both of its ranges.

=== Feeding ===
The buff-browed foliage-gleaner feeds on arthropods. It forages singly and in pairs, sometimes as part of mixed-species feeding flocks, and usually in the forest's undergrowth but sometimes on the ground or up to the subcanopy. It gleans its prey from dead leaves, debris, epiphytes, and branches.

=== Breeding ===
The buff-browed foliage-gleaner's breeding season or seasons have not been defined. In Peru, it includes August and in the southeast, it includes November. Three nest sites have been documented; they were holes in a rotting branch, a wall of a building, and a vertical pipe. Old woodpecker holes have also been reported as sites. The one fully described nest was a cup made of small twigs. The clutch size is two to four eggs. The incubation period, time to fledging, and details of parental care are not known.

=== Vocalization ===
The buff-browed foliage-gleaner's song apparently varies little despite its disjunct distribution. It is "a loud, fast, accelerating series, 'kuh-kuh-kuh-kihkihkihkikkikkikku', starting faintly and ascending, then louder and quavering or descending". One call is "kssr" and its alarm call is "set" or "setet".

== Status ==
The IUCN has assessed the buff-browed foliage-gleaner as being of Least Concern. It has a very large range, and though its population size is not known it is believed to be stable. No immediate threats have been identified. It is considered fairly common to common in most of its range though rare in northern Peru and in Paraguay. It occurs in many protected areas.
