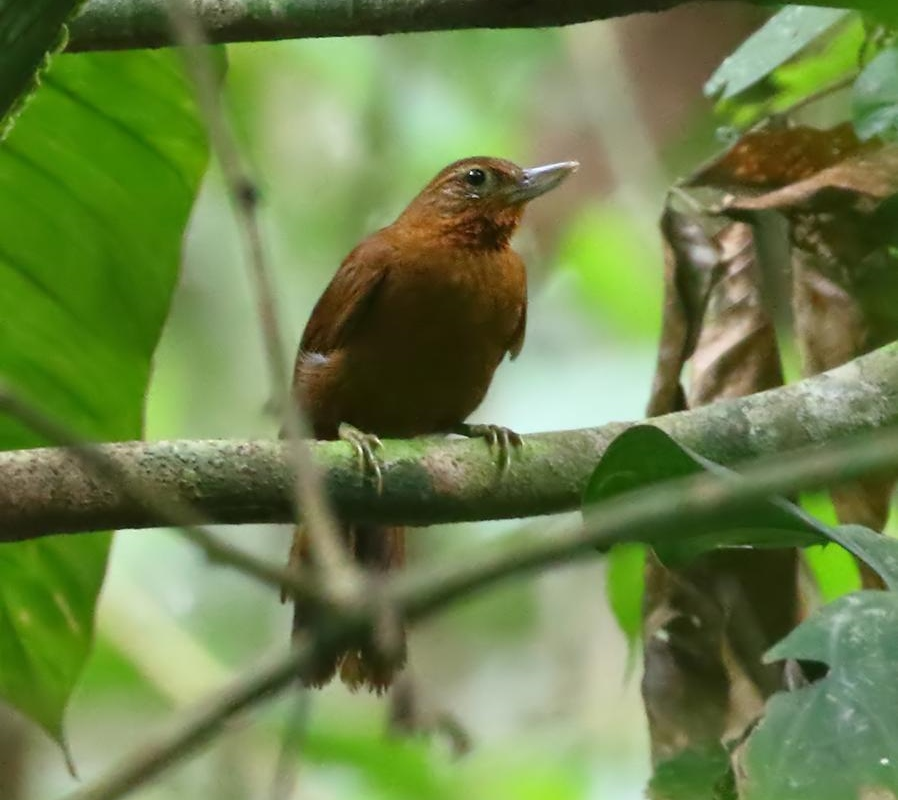

Conservation status
- Near Threatened (IUCN 3.1)

Scientific classification
- Kingdom: Animalia
- Phylum: Chordata
- Class: Aves
- Order: Passeriformes
- Family: Furnariidae
- Genus: Syndactyla
- Species: S. ucayalae

Binomial name
- Syndactyla ucayalae (Chapman, 1928)

Synonyms
- Simoxenops ucayalae

= Peruvian recurvebill =

Species of bird

The Peruvian recurvebill (Syndactyla ucayalae) is a Near Threatened species of bird in the Furnariinae subfamily of the ovenbird family Furnariidae. It is found in Bolivia, Brazil and Peru.

== Taxonomy and systematics ==
The Peruvian recurvebill and its sister species the Bolivian recurvebill (S. striata) were previously placed in genus Simoxenops. Their vocalizations and behavior strongly suggested the two species belonged in Syndactyla, and that placement was confirmed by genetic study.

The Peruvian recurvebill is monotypic.

== Description ==
The Peruvian recurvebill is 19 to 20 cm (7.5 to 7.9 in) long and weighs 39 to 55 g (1.4 to 1.9 oz). It is a largish furnariid with a heavy, wedge-shaped, slightly upturned, bill. The sexes have the same plumage. Adults have a faint narrow rufous supercilium, grizzled grayish, brownish, and dark buff lores and ear coverts, and a reddish rufous malar area. Their crown is dark reddish brown with faint streaks on the forehead. Their uppperparts are reddish brown with a slightly more reddish collar. Their wings are dark reddish brown with dark ochraceous at the bend. Their tail is dark reddish chestnut. Their throat is orange-rufous with faint paler streaks at its lower edge, their breast orange-rufous with faint paler streaks, their belly slightly duller than the breast and minimally streaked, and their flanks and undertail coverts darker orange-rufous than the breast. Their iris is brown to dark brown, their maxilla grayish horn to grayish brown, their mandible gray to silvery-bluish, and their legs and feet olive to olive-green. Juveniles have a brighter supercilium than adults, with whitish lores. Their crown is darker, with dark rufescent spots. Their back is darker and less rufescent and their underparts paler but with a strong black scalloped pattern.

== Distribution and habitat ==
The Peruvian recurvebill is found in the western Amazon Basin of southeastern Peru, northern Bolivia, and far western Brazil, and also locally in isolated areas further east in Amazonian Brazil. It is a bamboo specialist, inhabiting tropical lowland evergreen forest and riverside forest in and near thickets of Guadua bamboo. It also locally occurs in riverside thickets of Gynerium cane. In elevation it reaches 1,300 m (4,300 ft).

== Behavior ==
=== Movement ===
The Peruvian recurvebill is a year-round resident throughout its range.

=== Feeding ===
The Peruvian recurvebill feeds on a variety of arthropods including spiders, beetle larvae, and earwigs. It typically forages singly or in pairs and occasionally joins mixed-species feeding flocks. It mostly forages in dense undergrowth in the forest's understory, but will rarely also feed up to the mid-storey. It does most of its feeding on bamboo and lesser amounts on cane, vines, and other plants. It finds its prey by hammering, excavating, flaking, and gleaning.

=== Breeding ===
Nothing is known about the Peruvian recurvebill's breeding biology.

=== Vocalization ===
The Peruvian recurvebill's song is a "short, loud, harsh, ascending rattle (2-3 sec), last note(s) sometimes lowered". Its call is "a loud, hoarse, irritated, low-pitched 'chack' ".

== Status ==
The IUCN has assessed the Peruvian recurvebill as Near Threatened. It has a "moderately small" population "with highly fragmented populations occurring over a wide range". "Habitat within its core range is relatively intact, but the region, including those areas under legal protection, is being opened up for development...resulting in further degradation." It is considered rare to locally uncommon. It does occur in a few protected areas, and does appear to tolerate selective logging.
