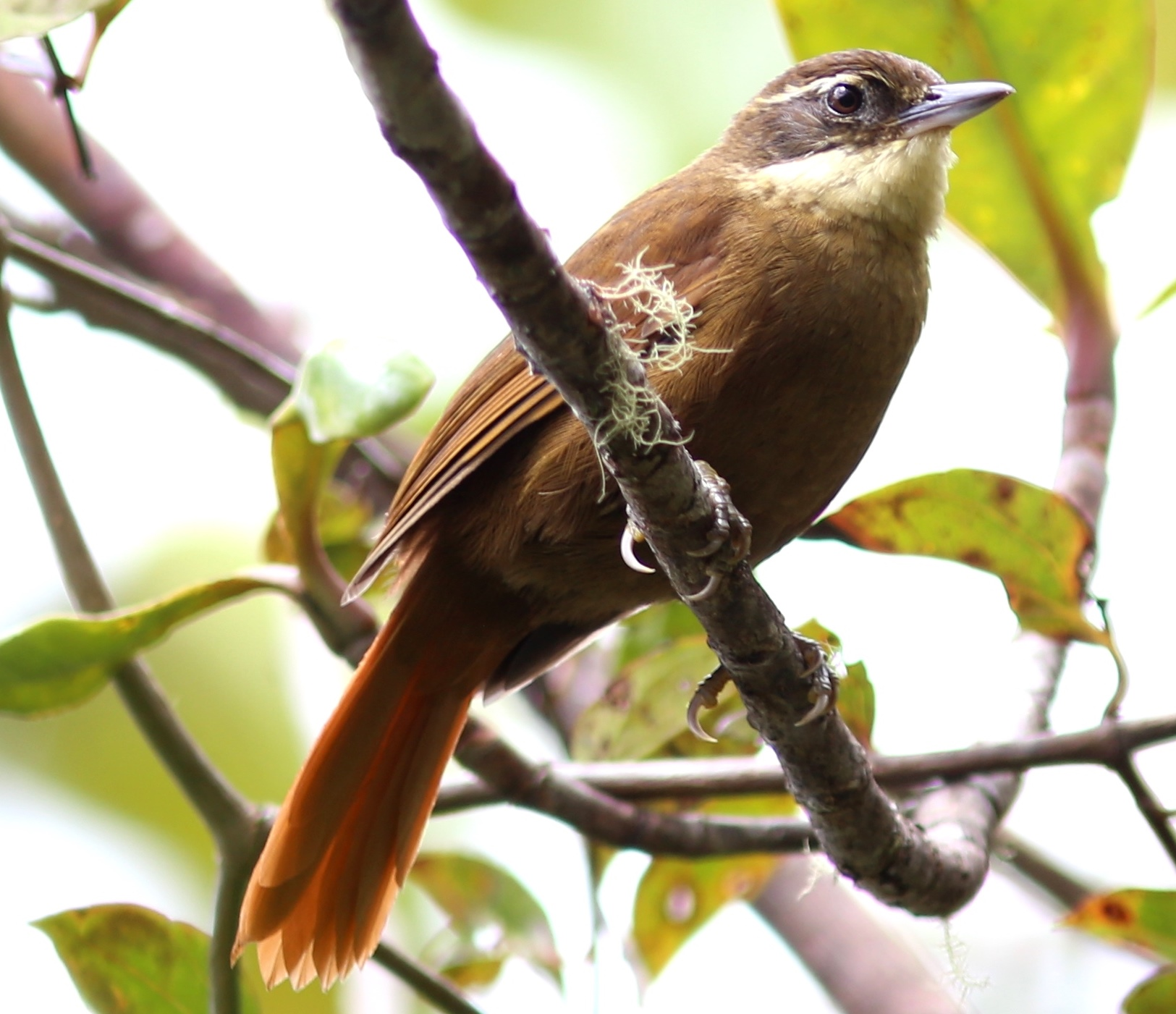

Conservation status
- Least Concern (IUCN 3.1)

Scientific classification
- Kingdom: Animalia
- Phylum: Chordata
- Class: Aves
- Order: Passeriformes
- Family: Furnariidae
- Genus: Syndactyla
- Species: S. roraimae

Binomial name
- Syndactyla roraimae (Hellmayr, 1917)

Synonyms
- Philydor raraimae; Automolus roraimus

= Tepui foliage-gleaner =

Species of bird

The tepui foliage-gleaner (Syndactyla roraimae), also known as the white-throated foliage-gleaner, is a species of bird in the Furnariinae subfamily of the ovenbird family Furnariidae. It is found in Brazil, Guyana and Venezuela.

== Taxonomy and systematics ==
The tepui foliage-gleaner was originally described in genus Philydor and then placed in genus Automolus. Publications in 2008 and 2011 showed that it belonged in Syndactyla.

The tepui foliage-gleaner has these four subspecies:

- S. r. paraquensis (Phelps, WH & Phelps, WH Jr, 1947)
- S. r. duidae (Chapman, 1939)
- S. r. roraimae (Hellmayr, 1917)
- S. r. urutani (Phelps, WH Jr & Dickerman, 1980)

== Description ==
The tepui foliage-gleaner is about 18 cm (7.1 in) long and weighs 22 to 32 g (0.78 to 1.1 oz). It is the smallest member of its genus and has the most striking facial pattern. The sexes have the same plumage. Adults of the nominate subspecies S. r. roraimae have a white supercilium that contrasts with their blackish-brown face. Their crown is dark grayish brown, their back rich dark rufescent brown, and their rump and uppertail coverts chestnut-rufous. Their tail is chestnut-rufous. Their wing coverts are mostly rich dark rufescent brown, their primary coverts darker brown, and their flight feathers a more rufescent brown. Their throat and malar area are white, their breast and belly medium brown, and their flanks and undertail coverts darker brown. Their iris is brown to dark brown, their maxilla black, their mandible highly variable from pinkish gray to black, and their legs and feet olive-yellow to greenish gray. Juveniles have an ochraeous supercilium, and more rufous underparts than adults, with dusky tips on the breast and belly feathers.

Subspecies S. r. paraquensis has a paler and more yellowish brown back and a paler and more grayish olive breast and belly than the nominate. S. r. duidae has a more rufescent crown and underparts with a much brighter belly than the nominate. S. r. urutani is paler overall than the other subspecies, and is less rufous above and less ochraceous below.

== Distribution and habitat ==
The tepui foliage-gleaner is found in the tepui region where eastern Venezuela, western Guyana, and northwestern Brazil meet. The subspecies' ranges are disjunct and they are found thus:

- S. r. paraquensis: Cerro Paraque in south-central Venezuela's Amazonas state
- S. r. duidae: several tepuis in Venezuela's Amazonas state, and Cerro de la Neblina straddling the Venezuela/Brazil border
- S. r. roraimae: Mount Roraima straddling the junction of Venezuela, Guyana, and Brazil, and other tepuis in southeastern Venezuela and western Guyana
- S. r. urutani: several tepuis in Venezuela's Bolívar state

The tepui foliage-gleaner inhabits montane evergreen forest, wind-stunted woodland, and the transition zone between them. In elevation it mostly ranges between 1,100 and 2,500 m (3,600 and 8,200 ft).

== Behavior ==
=== Movement ===
The tepui foliage-gleaner is a year-round resident throughout its range.

=== Feeding ===
The tepui foliage-gleaner feeds on a variety of arthropods such as Coleoptera and Orthoptera. It forages singly, in pairs, or in small family groups and often joins mixed-species feeding flocks. It mostly forages in the forest's understorey but will go up to the mid-storey. It typically stays low in the undergrowth but also seeks prey while clambering about in vine tangles and hitching along branches and up trunks. It gleans and probes for it prey among live and dead leaves, moss, and on branches. It occasionally hangs upside down while foraging.

=== Breeding ===
The tepui foliage-gleaner's breeding season in Guyana apparently ends in March or April, but nothing else is known about the species' breeding biology.

=== Vocalization ===
The tepui foliage-gleaner's song is "a long accelerating series of very harsh guttural 'jjza' notes, rising in pitch, usually preceded by a few single short notes". Its call is "a short, harsh 'chek' or 'tzik' ".

== Status ==
The IUCN has assessed the tepui foliage-gleaner as being of Least Concern. It has a restricted range and an unknown population size, but the latter is believed to be stable. No immediate threats have been identified. It is considered uncommon to locally common and occurs in one Venezuelan national park.
