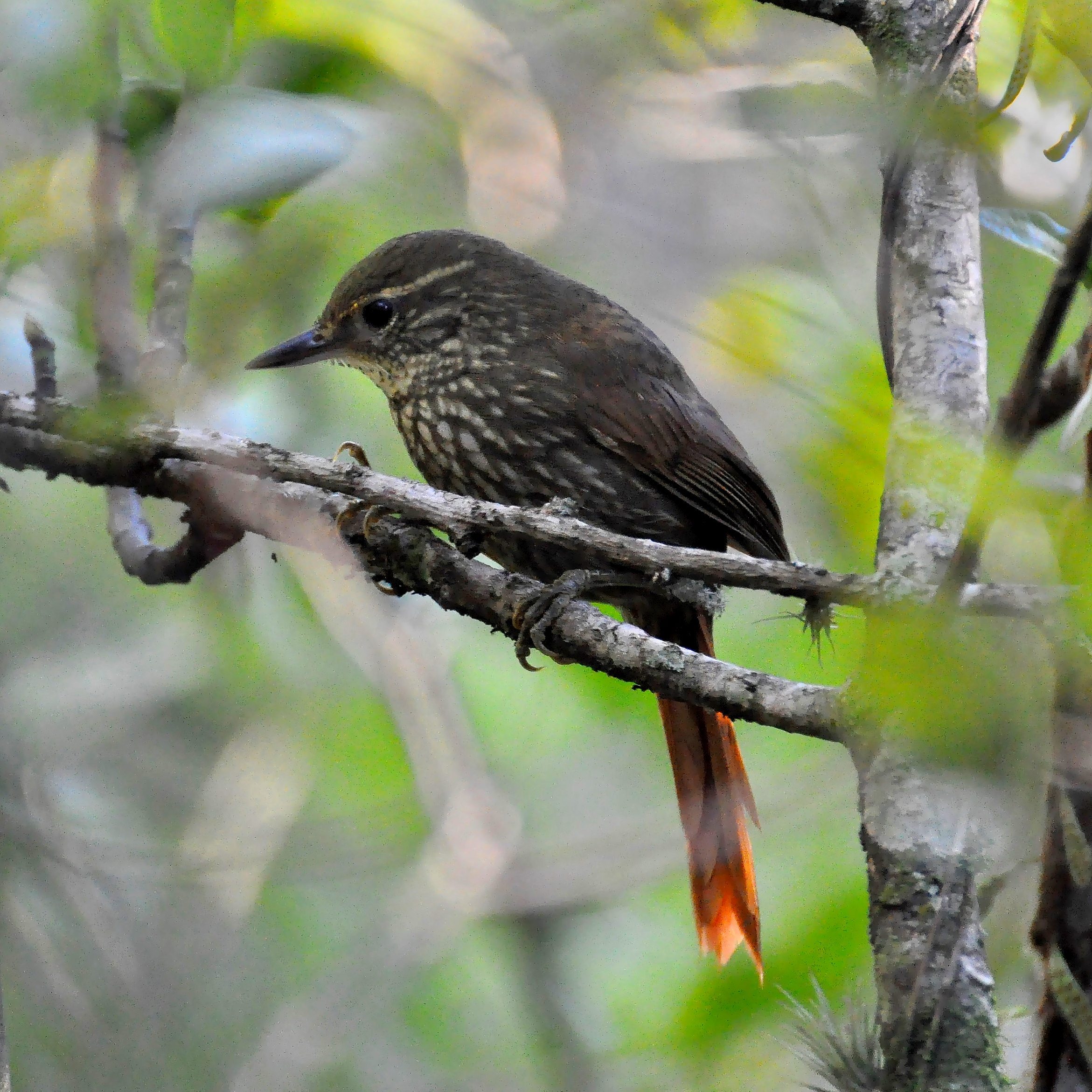
- Buff-browed foliage-gleaner (Syndactyla rufosuperciliata)

Scientific classification
- Kingdom: Animalia
- Phylum: Chordata
- Class: Aves
- Order: Passeriformes
- Family: Furnariidae
- Genus: Syndactyla; Reichenbach, 1853

Type species
- Xenops rufosuperciliatus Buff-browed foliage-gleaner Lafresnaye, 1832

Species
- See text

= Syndactyla =

Genus of birds

Syndactyla is a genus of foliage-gleaners, birds in the ovenbird family Furnariidae. It now includes the two recurvebills.

The recurvebills are restricted to humid forests in the South American countries of Bolivia, Peru and Brazil. Their common name refers to the peculiar bill-shape, which, at least in the case of the larger-billed Peruvian recurvebill, is an adaptation for manipulating bamboo stems. Both species are overall rufescent brown. The SACC reclassified the recurvebills from the genus Simoxenops to Syndactyla based on studies from Dewberry (2011).

== Taxonomy ==
The genus Syndactyla was introduced in 1853 by the German naturalist Ludwig Reichenbach to accommodate Xenops rufosuperciliatus Lafresnaye, the buff-browed foliage-gleaner. This is therefore the type species by monotypy. The name comes from Ancient Greek σύν (sún), meaning "together", and δάκτυλος (dáktulos), meaning "finger". Members of this genus are most closely related to the foliage-gleaners in the genus Anabacerthia. The recurvebills, S. ucayalae and S. striata, were formerly placed in their own genus Simoxenops, and S. roraimae was formerly placed in the genus Automolus.

=== Species ===
The genus contains eight species:

Image	Scientific name	Common Name	Distribution
	Syndactyla rufosuperciliata	Buff-browed foliage-gleaner	eastern foothills of Central Andes ; also southern Atlantic forest, northeastern Argentina and Uruguay
	Syndactyla dimidiata	Planalto foliage-gleaner	Brazil
	Syndactyla roraimae	Tepui foliage-gleaner	tepuis
	Syndactyla subalaris	Lineated foliage-gleaner	northern Andes
	Syndactyla ruficollis	Rufous-necked foliage-gleaner	southern Ecuador and northern Peru
	Syndactyla guttulata	Guttulate foliage-gleaner	Venezuelan Coastal Range
	Syndactyla ucayalae	Peruvian recurvebill	southeastern Peru and sparsely present across Amazonia
-	Syndactyla striata	Bolivian recurvebill	Yungas

== Bibliography ==
- Remsen, J. V. 2003. Simoxenops ucayalae & S. striatus (Peruvian & Bolivian Recurvebill). Pp. 331 in: del Hoyo, J., A. Alliott, & D. A. Christie. eds. 2003. Handbook of the Birds of the World. Vol. 8. Broadbills to Tapaculos. Lynx Edicions, Barcelona. ISBN 84-87334-50-4
- DERRYBERRY, E., S. CLARAMUNT, G. DERRYBERRY, R. T. CHESSER, J. CRACRAFT, A. ALEIXO, J. PÉREZ-ÉMAN, J. V. REMSEN, JR., & R. T. BRUMFIELD. 2011. Lineage diversification and morphological evolution in a large-scale continental radiation: the Neotropical ovenbirds and woodcreepers (Aves: Furnariidae). Evolution 65: 2973–2986.
