= Bolivian recurvebill =

Conservation status
- Least Concern (IUCN 3.1)

Scientific classification
- Kingdom: Animalia
- Phylum: Chordata
- Class: Aves
- Order: Passeriformes
- Family: Furnariidae
- Genus: Syndactyla
- Species: S. striata

Binomial name
- Syndactyla striata (Carriker, 1935)

Species of bird

The Bolivian recurvebill (Syndactyla striata) is a bird species in the Furnariinae subfamily of the ovenbird family Furnariidae. It is found in Bolivia and Peru.

== Taxonomy and systematics ==
The Bolivian recurvebill and its sister species the Peruvian recurvebill (S. ucayalae) were previously placed in genus Simoxenops. Their vocalizations and behavior strongly suggested the two species belonged in Syndactyla, and that placement was confirmed by genetic study.

The Bolivian recurvebill is monotypic.

== Description ==
The Bolivian recurvebill is 19 to 20 cm (7.5 to 7.9 in) long and weighs 37.5 to 48.5 g (1.3 to 1.7 oz). It is a largish furnariid with a heavy, wedge-shaped, somewhat upturned, bill. The sexes have the same plumage. Adults have a buff supercilium on a mostly grizzled brownish and rufous face. Their crown and back are dark rich reddish brown with dark buff streaks. Their rump is slightly paler than the back and minimally streaked, and their uppertail coverts are dark chestnut. Their wings are dark rich reddish brown with ochraceous at the bend. Their tail is dull chestnut. Their throat and malar area are orange-rufous with faint paler spots at the throat's lower edge, their breast and upper belly blurrily streaked with orange-rufous and brown, and their lower belly a minimally streaked rich brown. Their undertail coverts are chestnut-brown with ochraceous streaks. Their iris is dark, their bill gray, and their legs and feet grayish.

== Distribution and habitat ==
The Bolivian recurvebill is found in the Andean foothills of far southeastern Peru and western and central Bolivia. (Some taxonomic systems list it as endemic to Bolivia.) It inhabits humid forest in the foothills and lower montane zone at elevations between 650 and 1,700 m (2,100 and 5,600 ft). Though it is not a bamboo obligate, it is strongly associated with areas where Guadua bamboo is common to abundant.

== Behavior ==
=== Movement ===
The Bolivian recurvebill is a year-round resident throughout its range.

=== Feeding ===
The Bolivian recurvebill feeds on arthropods. It regularly joins mixed-species feeding flocks. It mostly forages in dense undergrowth in the forest's understory, but will rarely also feed up to the subcanopy. It finds its prey by gleaning, pecking, and probing dead branches, debris, and epiphytes.

=== Breeding ===
Nothing is known about the Bolivian recurvebill's breeding biology.

=== Vocalization ===
The Bolivian recurvebill's song is "a harsh, staccato, rattling, ascending series that levels in pitch and then ends abruptly". Its calls are "a raspy 'chet' and nasal, scolding 'naah' ".

== Status ==
The IUCN originally assessed the Bolivian recurvebill as Vulnerable, then in 2008 as Near Threatened, and since 2012 as being of Least Concern. Its "range and abundance have been recently [1992] studied, and it has been found to be more widely distributed and commoner than previously thought". Its population size is not known and is believed to be decreasing. The principal threat is deforestation for agriculture and human settlement, and through logging and mining operations. "Nonetheless, this species appears to adapt well to habitat modification and large extensions of pristine forest remain in inaccessible areas within the species' elevational range" It occurs in several protected areas.
