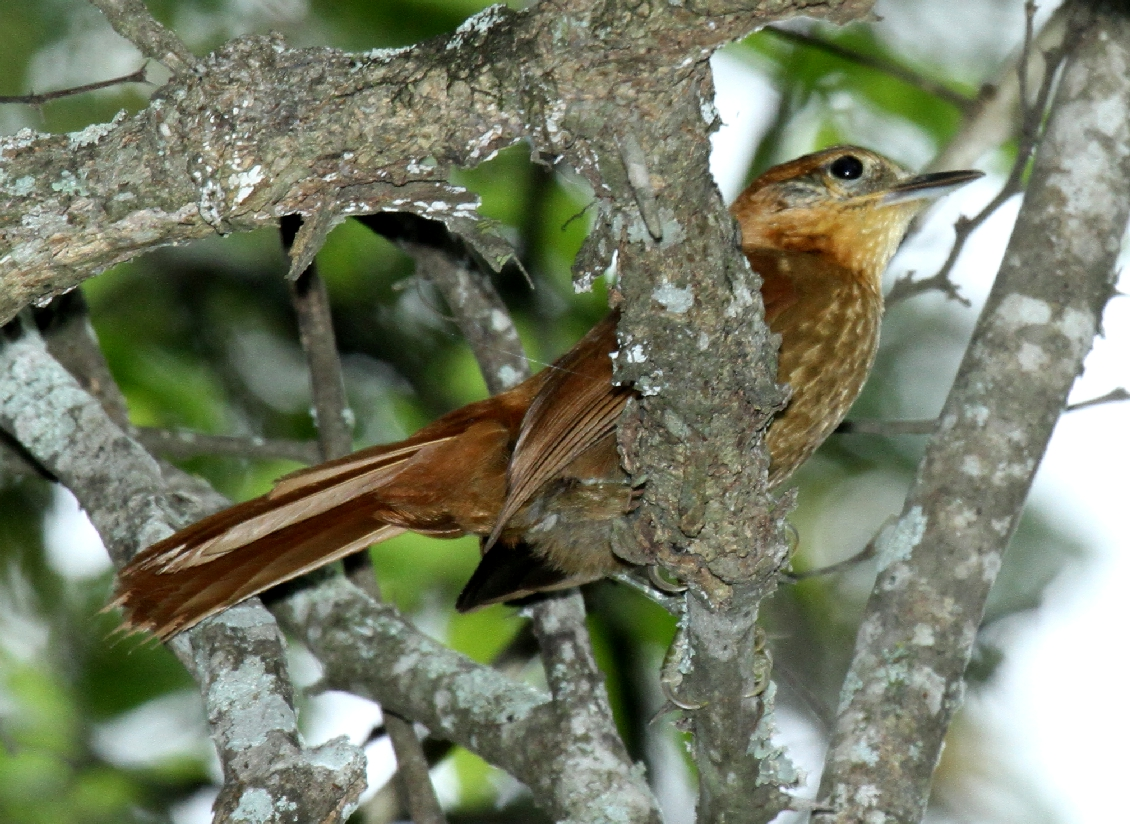

Conservation status
- Least Concern (IUCN 3.1)

Scientific classification
- Kingdom: Animalia
- Phylum: Chordata
- Class: Aves
- Order: Passeriformes
- Family: Furnariidae
- Genus: Syndactyla
- Species: S. ruficollis

Binomial name
- Syndactyla ruficollis (Taczanowski, 1884)

Synonyms
- Automolus ruficollis

= Rufous-necked foliage-gleaner =

Species of bird

The rufous-necked foliage-gleaner (Syndactyla ruficollis) is a Vulnerable species of bird in the Furnariinae subfamily of the ovenbird family Furnariidae. It is found in Ecuador and Peru.

== Taxonomy and systematics ==
The rufous-necked foliage-gleaner was previously placed in genus Automolus but a 2011 publication showed that it belongs in Syndactyla. It and the lineated foliage-gleaner (S. subalaris) are sister species.

The rufous-necked foliage-gleaner is monotypic.

== Description ==
The rufous-necked foliage-gleaner is 18 to 19 cm (7.1 to 7.5 in) long and weighs 29 to 39 g (1.0 to 1.4 oz). It is a largish furnariid with a less wedge-shaped bill than others of its genus. The sexes have the same plumage. Adults have an orange-rufous supercilium that extends to the nape; a dark brownish band behind the eye; grizzled grayish, dark brownish, and buff lores and ear coverts; and an orange-rufous to ochraceous buff area below the eye. Their crown is dark rufescent brown and they have an ill-defined collar of rufous streaks and spots. Their back is rich rusty brown with long thin buff streaks, their rump a redder brown, and their uppertail coverts bright chestnut. Their tail is dark chestnut and their wings are rich rusty brown with slightly darker primary coverts. Their chin is pale tawny-ochraceous, their throat more intensely ochracous, their breast olivaceous-brown with blurry rufescent buff streaks, their belly medium olivaceous brown, their flanks a slightly darker brown with a rufescent tinge, and their undertail coverts dark rufous. Their iris is brown, their maxilla dark brown to blackish, their mandible pale brownish or pale grayish, and their legs and feet grayish olive or olive-greenish. Juveniles are generally duller overall than adults, with a duskier (less brownish) crown and some dark brown edges on the throat feathers.

== Distribution and habitat ==
The rufous-necked foliage-gleaner is found in coastal hills and the western slope of the Andes in Ecuador's El Oro and Loja provinces and in northwestern Peru as far south as the Department of Lambayeque. It inhabits montane evergreen forest and tropical deciduous woodlands, where it favors bamboo, streamsides, and shady ravines. In elevation it mostly ranges from 1,000 to 2,600 m (3,300 to 8,500 ft) but occurs occasionally as low as 400 m (1,300 ft) and as high as 2,900 m (9,500 ft).

== Behavior ==
=== Movement ===
The rufous-necked foliage-gleaner is a year-round resident throughout its range.

=== Feeding ===
The rufous-necked foliage-gleaner feeds mostly on arthropods. It typically forages singly or in pairs and readily joins mixed-species feeding flocks. It mostly forages from the forest's understory to its mid levels. It gleans and probes for its prey among debris, moss, bamboo stems, ferns, and bromeliads while hitching along branches and trunks. It occasionally forages in leaf litter on the ground.

=== Breeding ===
The rufous-necked foliage-gleaner is thought to breed in the local wet season of January to May. Nothing else is known about its breeding biology.

=== Vocalization ===
The rufous-necked foliage-gleaner's song is "a harsh, nasal 'chick, chick, che-che, tirrrrrr', 2–3 seconds long, final note downward-inflected". Its contact call has been described as a "sharp, nasal 'ank' or 'chech' ".

== Status ==
The IUCN originally assessed the rufous-necked foliage-gleaner as Threatened but since 1994 has listed it as Vulnerable. It has a small, severely fragmented, range. Its estimated population of 1500 to 7000 mature individuals is believed to be declining. "Significant habitat loss is ongoing, at least in unprotected areas, and will soon remove almost all remaining lowland forest". Habitat loss is less, but still significant, at higher elevations. It was previously considered fairly common to common but is now uncommon and local. It does occur in several protected areas in both Ecuador and Peru.
