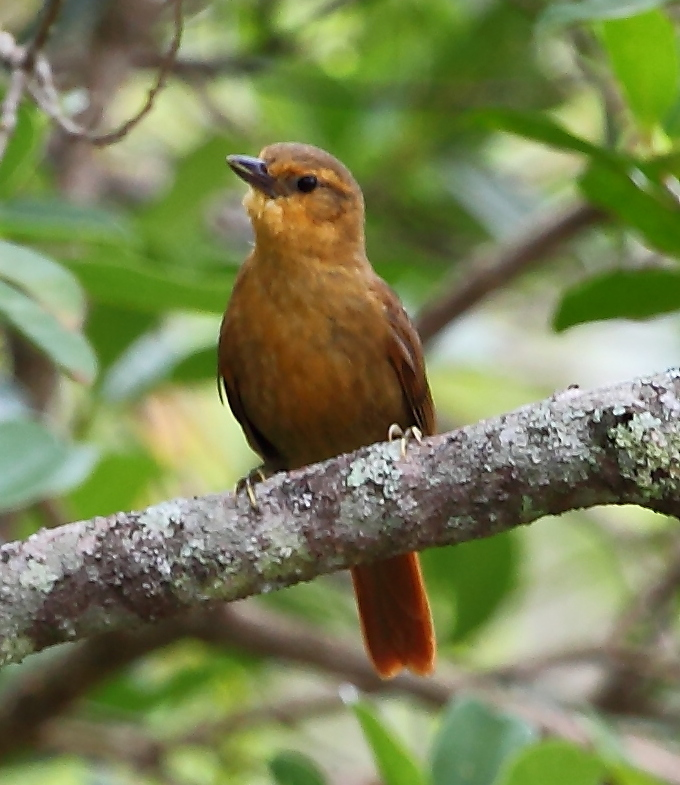
- at Serra da Canastra National Park, Minas Gerais state, Brazil

Conservation status
- Least Concern (IUCN 3.1)

Scientific classification
- Kingdom: Animalia
- Phylum: Chordata
- Class: Aves
- Order: Passeriformes
- Family: Furnariidae
- Genus: Syndactyla
- Species: S. dimidiata

Binomial name
- Syndactyla dimidiata (Pelzeln, 1859)

Synonyms
- Philydor dimidiatum; Philydor dimidiatus

= Planalto foliage-gleaner =

Species of bird

The planalto foliage-gleaner (Syndactyla dimidiata), also known as the russet-mantled foliage-gleaner, is a species of bird in the Furnariinae subfamily of the ovenbird family Furnariidae. It is found in Brazil and Paraguay.

== Taxonomy and systematics ==
The planalto foliage-gleaner was long placed in genus Philydor but morphological and vocal data suggested affinities within Syndactyla. Molecular data confirmed this change and revealed that. S. dimidiata the sister species of S. rufosuperciliata.

While the International Ornithological Committee and BirdLife International's Handbook of the Birds of the World treat the species as monotypic, the Clements taxonomy splits it into two subspecies: nominate S. d. dimidiata (Pelzeln, 1859) and S. d. baeri (Hellmayr, 1911). The later subspecies has been treated as a separate species in the early to mid-1900s but a recent study casts doubt on baeri's validity as either a species or subspecies.

This article treats the planalto foliage-gleaner as monotypic, though the putative taxon baeri is mentioned.

== Description ==
The planalto foliage-gleaner is about 17 cm (6.7 in) long and weighs 27 to 32 g (0.95 to 1.1 oz). It is a medium-sized furnariid with a long pointed bill. The sexes have the same plumage. Adults have a mostly rufescent orange face; the color is deeper on the supercilium and the ear coverts are darker. Their crown and upperparts are bright rufescent brown with a cinnamon tinge. Their tail is rufous-chestnut and their wings are dark rufescent brown with brighter edges on the primaries. Their throat and underparts are mostly unmarked ochraceous rufous, with faint pale streaks on the breast and an olive cast on the flanks. Their iris is brown, their maxilla dark brown, their mandible horn with a pinkish base, and their legs and feet olive. Juveniles have a shorter bill than adults, a whitish throat, and brown bars on their breast. (Compared to the above, baeri has a bright olive-brown back, less rufescent wings, and duller underparts.)

== Distribution and habitat ==
The planalto foliage-gleaner is found in the southern planalto from Brazil's Mato Grosso state east to Bahia and south to Paraná and eastern Paraguay's Concepción and Amambay departments. (The baeri taxon is in the southeasterly part of the species' range.) The species inhabits lowland tropical evergreen forest, gallery forest, and tropical woodlands within the cerrado. In elevation it ranges from 100 to 1,200 m (300 to 3,900 ft).

== Behavior ==
=== Movement ===
The planalto foliage-gleaner is a year-round resident throughout its range.

=== Feeding ===
The planalto foliage-gleaner's diet has not been studied but is assumed to be arthropods. It is most often seen foraging in pairs and occasionally as part of mixed-species feeding flocks. It forages from the forest's understory to its mid-storey, taking prey from branches and epiphytes.

=== Breeding ===
Nothing is known about the planalto foliage-gleaner's breeding biology.

=== Vocalization ===
The planalto foliage-gleaner's song has been likened to "a small, slowly starting motorbike". It is a "rather short or very long series of 'tsjek' notes, ascending, starting and ending with some stuttering". Its contact call is "a loud, nasal 'cheh', single or doubled".

== Status ==
The IUCN originally assessed the planalto foliage-gleaner as Near Threatened but since 2004 has rated it as being of Least Concern. It has a large range but its population size is not known and is believed to be decreasing. "The species is presumably threatened by agricultural conversion of forested areas within the Brazilian planalto, and more information is required regarding population size and trends." It appears to be rare across its range and to not tolerate very disturbed forest. It does occur in a few protected areas.
