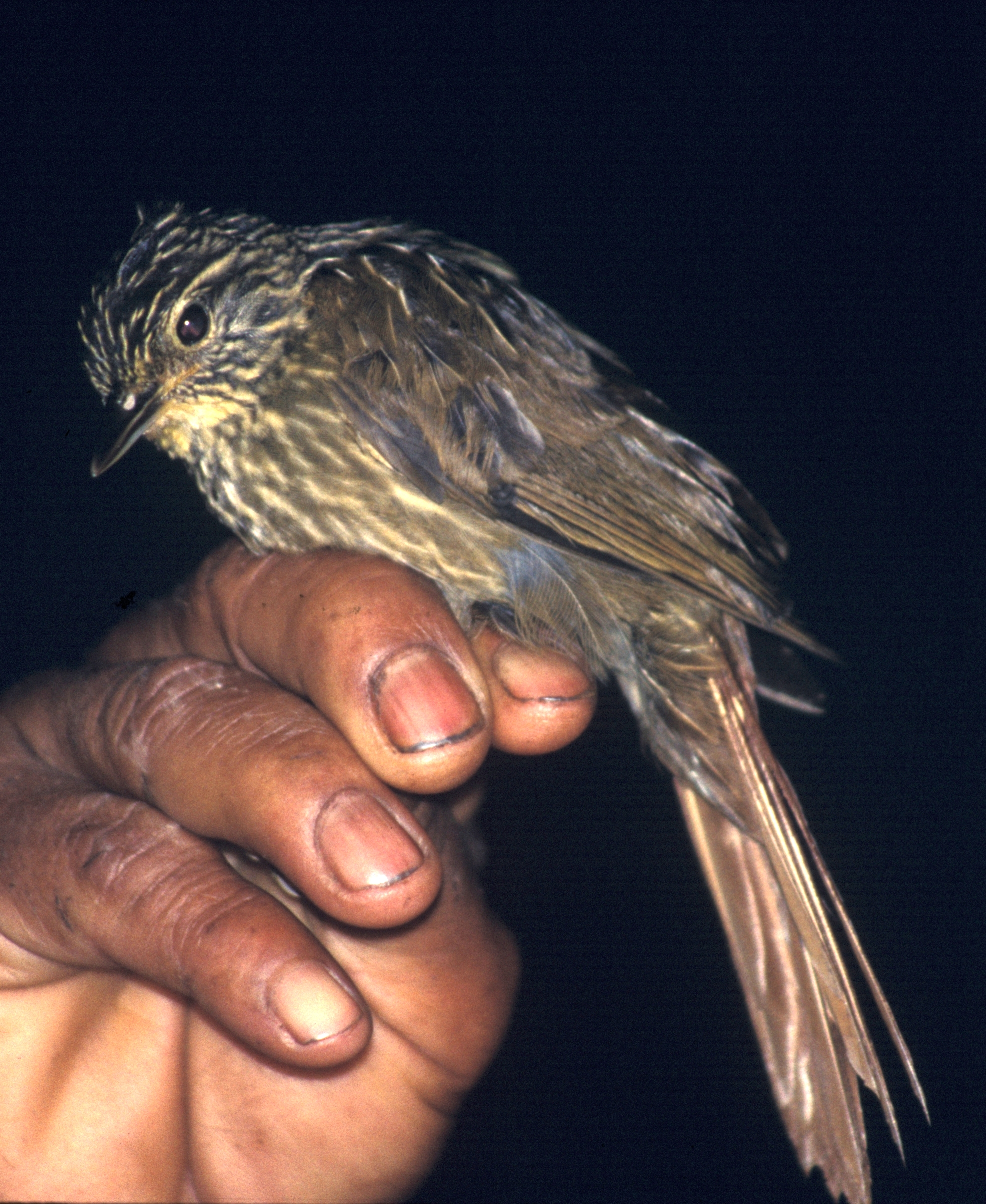

Conservation status
- Least Concern (IUCN 3.1)

Scientific classification
- Kingdom: Animalia
- Phylum: Chordata
- Class: Aves
- Order: Passeriformes
- Family: Furnariidae
- Genus: Syndactyla
- Species: S. subalaris

Binomial name
- Syndactyla subalaris (Sclater, PL, 1859)

= Lineated foliage-gleaner =

Species of bird

The lineated foliage-gleaner (Syndactyla subalaris) is a species of bird in the Furnariinae subfamily of the ovenbird family Furnariidae. It is found in Colombia, Costa Rica, Ecuador, Panama, Peru, and Venezuela.

== Taxonomy and systematics ==
The lineated foliage-gleaner's taxonomy is unsettled. The International Ornithological Committee and BirdLife International's Handbook of the Birds of the World recognize these six subspecies:

- S. s. lineata (Lawrence, 1865)
- S. s. tacarcunae (Chapman, 1923)
- S. s. subalaris (Sclater, PL, 1859)
- S. s. striolata (Todd, 1913)
- S. s. olivacea Phelps, WH & Phelps, WH Jr, 1956
- S. s. mentalis (Taczanowski & Berlepsch, 1885)

The Clements taxonomy does not recognize S. s. olivacea as separate from S. s. striolata. It adds two subspecies that the other systems include within S. s. mentalis: S. s. colligata (Zimmer, 1935) and S. s. ruficrissa (Carriker, 1930). Their apparent differences from mentalis are within its range of variability.

The lineated and rufous-necked foliage-gleaner (S. ruficollis) are sister species.

This article follows the six-subspecies model.

== Description ==
The lineated foliage-gleaner is 17 to 19 cm (6.7 to 7.5 in) long and weighs 26 to 40 g (0.92 to 1.4 oz). The sexes have the same plumage. Adults of the nominate subspecies S. s. subalaris have a discontinuous light buff supercilium that extends to the nape; the rest of their face is blackish brown with small buff markings. Their crown is dark brown with thin buff streaks. They have a narrow ill-defined darker brown collar with wide buff streaks. Their back is rich dark brown with long thin buff streaks, their rump a plain rich dark brown, and their uppertail coverts dark brown with chestnut tips. Their tail is dark chestnut and their wings are rich dark brown with light rufescent brown at the bend. Their throat is buff with blurry brownish streaks, their breast dark brown with buff streaks, their belly and flanks a slightly paler brown with thinner streaks that disappear towards the rear, and their undertail coverts the paler brown with wider ochraceous streaks. Their iris is brown to dark brown, their maxilla dark brown to black, their mandible variable from grayish horn to ivory, and their legs and feet olive-green to greenish gray. Juveniles are generally brighter overall than adults, with a blacker cinnamon-streaked crown, a more reddish brown back, black speckles on the chin, a more ochraceous cinnamon supercilium, neck, and breast, richer brown flanks, and cinnamon-brown undertail coverts.

Subspecies S. s. lineata has a paler but more rufescent back than the nominate, a heavily marked buffy yellow throat, and slightly more olivaceous underparts with thinner streaks. S. s. tacarcunae is similar to lineata but with a darker more olive-brown back, a paler more yellowish throat, and grayer underparts. Compared to the nominate, S. s. striolata has a slightly darker and less rufescent crown with heavier buff streaks, wider streaks on the back, less rufescent wings, a paler and less buffy throat, and wider and more extensive streaks on the underparts. S. s. olivacea has a more blackish brown crown than the nominate and the most olivaceous underparts of all the subspecies. S. s. mentalis has a blacker crown than the nominate, more conspicuous streaks on the crown and nape, a darker and more buffy yellow throat, and slightly more rufescent underparts with stronger streaks.

== Distribution and habitat ==
The lineated foliage-gleaner has a disjunct distribution. Its subspecies are found thus:

- S. s. lineata: mountains of Costa Rica and into western Panama as far as Veraguas Province
- S. s. tacarcunae Serranía del Darién, a range from extreme eastern Panama into northwestern Colombia
- S. s. subalaris: Colombia's Western Andes, the western slope of its Central Andes, and its isolated Serranía de San Lucas south through western Ecuador to El Oro Province
- S. s. striolata: Colombia's Eastern Andes and the Andes of western Venezuela.
- S. s. olivacea: southwestern Táchira state in western Venezuela
- S. s. mentalis: eastern Ecuador south into Peru as far as the Department of Junín

The lineated foliage-gleaner inhabits evergreen forest in the subtropical and foothill zones of its mountain ranges. It especially favors areas along streams with dense undergrowth. In elevation it mostly ranges between 1,000 and 2,300 m (3,300 and 7,500 ft) but locally occurs as low as 600 m (2,000 ft) and in Colombia as high as 2,800 m (9,200 ft).

== Behavior ==
=== Movement ===
The lineated foliage-gleaner is a year-round resident throughout its range.

=== Feeding ===
The lineated foliage-gleaner feeds mostly on arthropods including insects and spiders, and occasionally on small vertebrates like frogs and lizards. It typically forages singly or in pairs and readily joins mixed-species feeding flocks. It mostly forages from the forest's understory to its mid levels. It gleans and probes for its prey among live and dead leaves, debris, moss, and epiphytes while climbing along large branches and vines. It often hangs almost upside down to reach the bottom of branches.

=== Breeding ===
The lineated foliage-gleaner's nesting season or seasons have not been described. It is assumed to be monogamous. The only fully described nest was a cup of soft fibers on a twig platform, built in a hole in a tree and containing two eggs. Nothing else is known about the species' breeding biology.

=== Vocalization ===
The lineated foliage-gleaner's song is "a fast, accelerating series of 6–10 dry, harsh, scratchy, nasal notes...sometimes ascending and then descending, sometimes accelerating and then decelerating, ending abruptly". It has been put into words as "bzert, bzert, jzut, jzut-jj-jj-jj" and "anh, anh, anh-anh-anh-anhanhanhanh". Its call is dry and harsh, variously described as " 'tzuk', 'tcheck', 'skanh', 'jert' or 'kr-rk' ".

== Status ==
The IUCN has assessed the lineated foliage-gleaner as being of Least Concern. It has a very large range and an estimated population of at least 500,000 mature individuals; the latter is believed to be decreasing. No immediate threats have been identified. It is considered uncommon to fairly common throughout its range and occurs in several protected areas.
