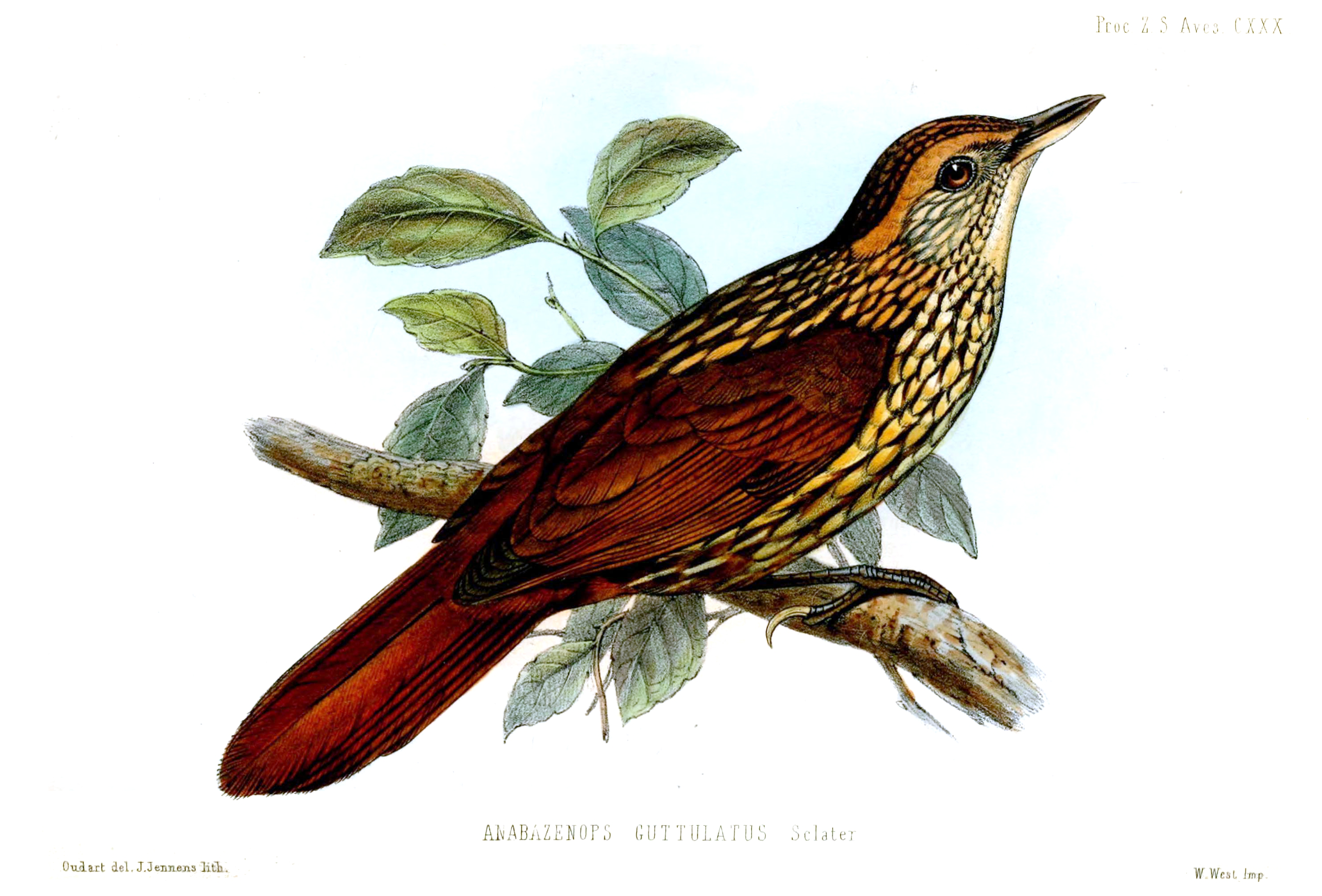

Conservation status
- Least Concern (IUCN 3.1)

Scientific classification
- Kingdom: Animalia
- Phylum: Chordata
- Class: Aves
- Order: Passeriformes
- Family: Furnariidae
- Genus: Syndactyla
- Species: S. guttulata

Binomial name
- Syndactyla guttulata (Sclater, PL, 1858)

Synonyms
- Anabazenops guttulatus

= Guttulate foliage-gleaner =

Species of bird

The guttulate foliage-gleaner (Syndactyla guttulata) is a species of bird in the Furnariinae subfamily of the ovenbird family Furnariidae. It is endemic to Venezuela.

== Taxonomy and systematics ==
The guttulate foliage-gleaner was originally described as Anabazenops guttulatus. It early acquired the English name "guttulated foliage-gleaner", a name which persisted until it was pointed out that the word guttulated does not exist in English. "Webster's International indeed states that the English noun guttula is an obscure word for a drop-shaped spot, and the adjectival form is guttulate, not "guttulated".

The guttulate foliage-gleaner has two subspecies, the nominate S. g. guttulata (Sclater, PL, 1858) and S. g. pallida (Zimmer, JT & Phelps, WH, 1944).

== Description ==
The guttulate foliage-gleaner is 17 to 19 cm (6.7 to 7.5 in) long and weighs 34 to 38 g (1.2 to 1.3 oz). It is a largish furnariid with a more wedge-shaped bill than many others of its genus. The sexes have the same plumage. Adults of the nominate subspecies have a faint dull ochraceous supercilium that fades on its way to the nape, and dark brown ear coverts with narrow buff streaks on an otherwise pale-spotted dark brown face. Their crown is dark rufescent brown with thin rusty streaks, and paler rusty spots on the forehead. Their back is dark rufescent brown wide black-edged rusty to whitish buff streaks. Their rump, uppertail coverts, and tail are reddish chestnut. Their wings are dark rufescent brown with reddish chestnut tips on the flight feathers. Their throat is yellowish with dark brown at its lower edge, their breast and belly dark brown with buffy streaks that fade by the lower belly, and their undertail coverts more rufescent brown. Their iris is dark brown, their maxilla dark gray to blackish, their mandible pale horn-gray with some dark at the base, and their legs and feet olive-gray. Subspecies S. g. pallida is similar to the nominate with paler edges on the upperparts' feathers and a paler rufous rump and tail.

== Distribution and habitat ==
The guttulate foliage-gleaner is found near the north coast of Venezuela. The nominate subspecies occurs in Sierra de San Luis in Falcón state and in the western part of the Venezuelan Coastal Range as far east as Aragua state. S. g. pallida is found disjunctly in the eastern part of the Coastal Range between Anzoátegui and Monagas states. The species inhabits primary montane evergreen forest and secondary forest at elevations between 900 and 2,100 m (3,000 and 6,900 ft).

== Behavior ==
=== Movement ===
The guttulate foliage-gleaner is a year-round resident throughout its range.

=== Feeding ===
The guttulate foliage-gleaner feeds mostly on arthropods. It typically forages singly or in pairs and readily joins mixed-species feeding flocks. It also occasionally follows army ant swarms. It mostly forages in dense undergrowth in the forest's understory, but will rarely also feed up to the mid-storey. It gleans for its prey among dead leaves and bromeliads and also flakes bark and chisels into twigs. It often clings sideways and upside down on branches while foraging.

=== Breeding ===
The guttulate foliage-gleaner is assumed to be monogamous. What could have been its nest was in a twig-filled cavity in a wall. Nothing else is known about its breeding biology.

=== Vocalization ===
The guttulate foliage-gleaner's song is "a harsh, accelerating 'cjak, cjak, czak czak-zak-zak-zak-za-za-za', sometimes followed by a few more notes at end". Its call is "a harsh, rough 'chak' ".

== Status ==
The IUCN has assessed the guttulate foliage-gleaner as being of Least Concern. Though it has a small range and an unknown population size, the latter is believed to be stable. No immediate threats have been identified. It is considered uncommon to locally fairly common and occurs in Henri Pittier National Park.
