= Gleaning (birds) =

Feeding behavior of plucking invertebrates from solid surfaces

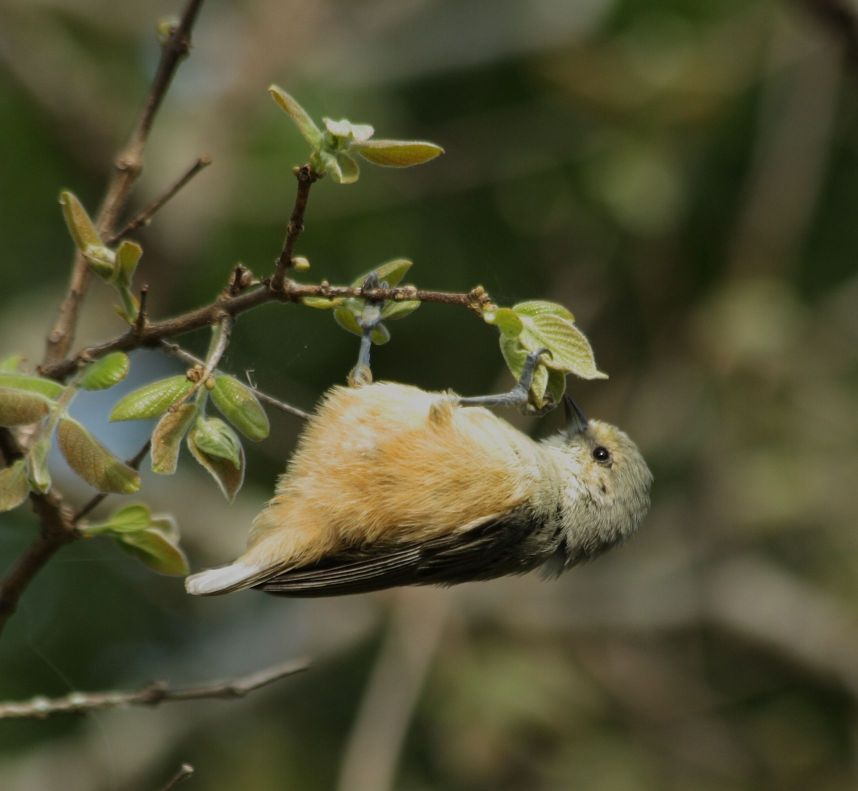
African penduline-tit (Anthoscopus caroli) hanging from the end of a branch and gleaning

Gleaning is a feeding strategy by birds and bats in which they catch invertebrate prey, mainly arthropods, by plucking them from foliage or the ground, from crevices such as rock faces and under the eaves of houses, or even, as in the case of ticks and lice, from living animals. This behavior is contrasted with hawking insects from the air or chasing after moving insects such as ants. Gleaning, in birds, does not refer to foraging for seeds or fruit.

Gleaning is a common feeding strategy for some groups of birds, including nuthatches, tits (including chickadees), wrens, woodcreepers, treecreepers, Old World flycatchers, Tyrant flycatchers, babblers, Old World warblers, New World warblers, vireos and some hummingbirds and cuckoos. Many birds make use of multiple feeding strategies, depending on the availability of different sources of food and opportunities of the moment.

== Techniques and adaptations ==
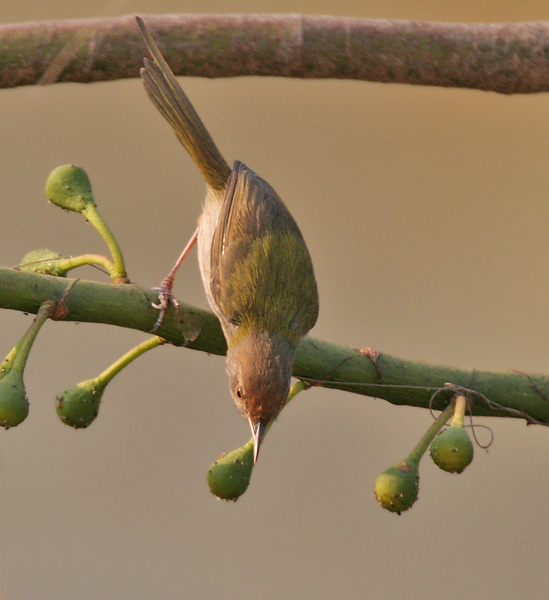
Common tailorbird (Orthotomus sutorius) gleaning among flower buds

Foliage gleaning, the strategy of gleaning over the leaves and branches of trees and shrubs, can involve a variety of styles and maneuvers. Some birds, such as the common chiffchaff of Eurasia and the Wilson's warbler of North America, feed actively and appear energetic. Some will even hover in the air near a leaf or twig while gleaning from it; this behavior is called "hover-gleaning". Other birds are more methodical in their approach to gleaning, even seeming lethargic as they perch upon and deliberately pick over foliage. This behavior is characteristic of the bay-breasted warbler and many vireos. Another tactic is to hang upside-down from the tips of branches to glean the undersides of leaves. Tits such as the familiar black-capped chickadee are often observed feeding in this manner. Some birds, like the ruby-crowned kinglet and red-eyed vireo of North America use a combination of these tactics.

Gleaning birds are typically small with compact bodies and have small, sharply pointed bills. These features are even seen in gleaning birds that are not closely related. For example, in flycatchers of the family Tyrannidae, in which some member species are more adapted for hawking insects on the wing and others for gleaning, the gleaners have bills that resemble those of tits and warblers, unlike their larger-billed relatives. Also, some members of the woodpecker family, particularly piculets such as the rufous piculet of Southeast Asia, are similarly adapted for gleaning, with small, compact bodies and sharp bills, rather than the long, supportive tails and wedge-shaped bills more typical of woodpeckers. Birds such as the aforementioned piculet are specialized for gleaning the bark of trees, as are nuthatches, woodcreepers, and treecreepers. Most bark-gleaners work their way up tree trunks or along branches, though nuthatches are well known as birds that can go the opposite direction, facing down and working their way down the trunk, as well. This requires strong legs and feet on the part of the nuthatch and piculet, while birds that face upwards tend to have stiff tail feathers to prop them up.

Birds often specialize in a particular niche, such as a particular stratum of forest or type of vegetation. In South and Southeast Asia, for example, the mountain tailorbird is often found gleaning in thickets and stands of bamboo, Abbott's babbler gleans lower-storey foliage in lowland forest, the rufous-chested flycatcher and brown fulvetta are birds of the mid-storey forest, the yellow-breasted warbler gleans in the mid- to upper-storey, and the greater green leafbird specializes in the upper-storey forest. The Javan white-eye is a bird of coastal scrub and mangroves, while the related black-capped white-eye is restricted to montane forest.

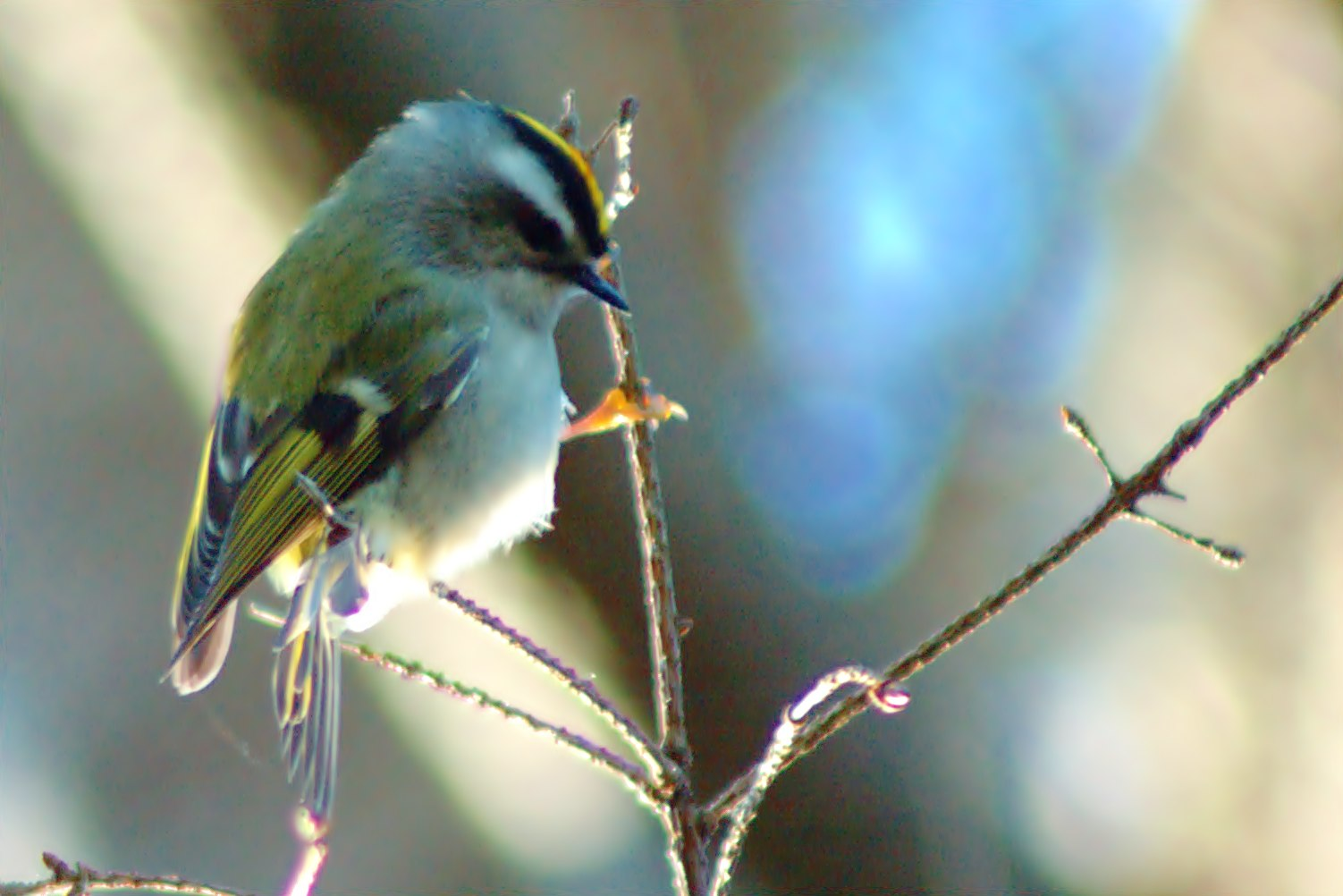
Golden-crowned kinglet (Regulus satrapa) gleaning from twigs

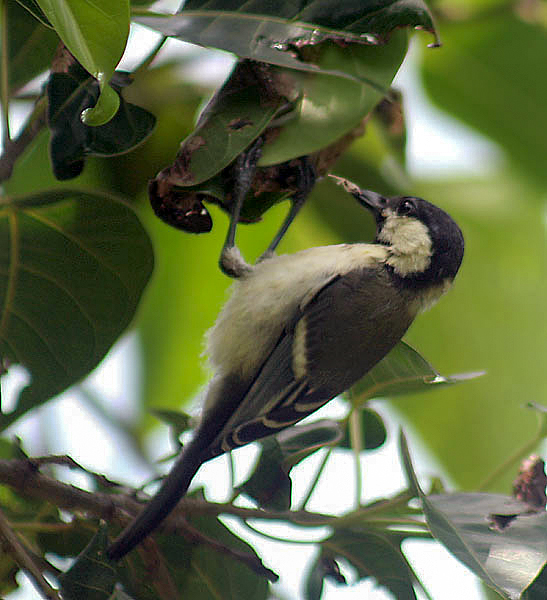
Cinereous tit (Parus cinereus) hanging from a leaf and gleaning

Further specialization within a habitat is associated with behaviors and morphological adaptations (physical traits of size and shape). Tiny birds are lightweight enough to hang onto the ends of twigs and pluck small prey; the goldcrest of Europe and its counterpart the golden-crowned kinglet of North America exhibit this feeding style. The related common firecrest is very similar in size and shape, but slightly bulkier, and has less of a tendency to glean along twigs and more of a habit of flying from perch to perch. Having a very small bill seems to be good for taking tiny prey from the surfaces of leaves, and small-billed birds such as the blue tit forage in broad-leafed woodlands. The long-billed gnatwren and speckled spinetail of Central and South America, and the ashy tailorbird and striped tit-babbler of South Asia, show a preference for gleaning in tangles of vines. The ash-browed spinetail of South America specializes in gleaning among epiphytes on moss-covered tree branches. Many hummingbirds take small insects from flowers while probing for nectar, and some species glean actively among bark and leaves. The Puerto Rican emerald is one such hummingbird. Found only on the island of Puerto Rico, the female subsists on insects and spiders, while the male has a typical hummingbird diet of nectar. Hummingbirds and other gleaners are also sometimes attracted to the sap wells created by sapsuckers. Sapsuckers, which are in the woodpecker family, drill small holes in living tree branches to get the sap flowing. The sap and the insects it attracts are then consumed, and rufous hummingbirds have been observed to follow the movements of sapsuckers and take advantage of this food source. Clusters of dead leaves also often harbor invertebrate prey, and the Bewick's wren and worm-eating warbler of North America have long bills well-suited for probing them, as do certain Asian babblers, such as the rusty-cheeked scimitar babbler. In Central and South America, foliage-gleaners such as the red-faced spinetail and buff-throated foliage-gleaner are also examples of birds that glean clusters of dead leaves.

Crevice-gleaning is a niche particular to dry and rocky habitats. Adaptations for crevice-gleaning are similar to those of bark-gleaning. Just as the Bewick's wren, as mentioned in the preceding paragraph, has a long bill suited for poking around in the small places of woods and gardens, another North American wren, the canyon wren, has an even longer bill, which allows it to probe crevices in rocky cliffs. It also has skeletal adaptations to aid it in reaching deep into small spaces. These same traits are useful for gleaning the sides of buildings, as well. Another kind of rocky habitat is found along mountain streams, where birds such as the Louisiana waterthrush of North America and the forktails of Asia pick over stream-side rocks and exposed roots for aquatic insects and other moisture-loving prey.

== Other foraging techniques ==
Foraging for invertebrate prey on the ground often involves gleaning the leaf litter of the forest floor, sometimes flicking, flipping, or scratching through dead leaves. Birds can use their bills to flick or toss dead leaves from the ground to reveal prey residing beneath. The leaftossers of Central and South America and the pittas and laughingthrushes of Asia do this. An example of a bird that employs flipping is the ovenbird, a species of North American wood-warbler. It deliberately turns over leaves on the ground to search for spiders, worms, and such underneath. In other parts of the world, similar leaf-flipping behavior has been observed in unrelated birds, such as the jungle babbler of India. Some birds, such as hummingbirds, will use their wings to create a blast of air to roll leaves over. Other birds rake a foot through the leaf litter, like a chicken, for the same purpose. This has been observed in buttonquails. Some American sparrows, such as the green-tailed towhee, perform a double-scratch by raking both legs simultaneously through the leaf-litter. They then catch prey items dislodged by the disturbance. Ground-foraging birds can be very hard for humans to observe, as they often occupy densely vegetated habitat, as in the case of the Bornean wren-babbler, which specializes in gleaning leaf litter in gullies in the forest of Southeast Asia.

A feeding technique that is somewhere between gleaning and hawking is where a bird flies from a perch and takes prey off foliage; this is called "sally-gleaning". The pygmy tyrants of South America are tiny flycatchers that feed this way. The todies of the Caribbean employ a distinct version of sally-gleaning. These small birds choose a perch within their lush forest and plantation habitats in the Greater Antilles, from which they scan the undersides of leaves above them. Upon spotting an insect or spider, they fly up in an arcing sally, pluck their prey item without stopping, and complete the arcing movement to land on a new perch.

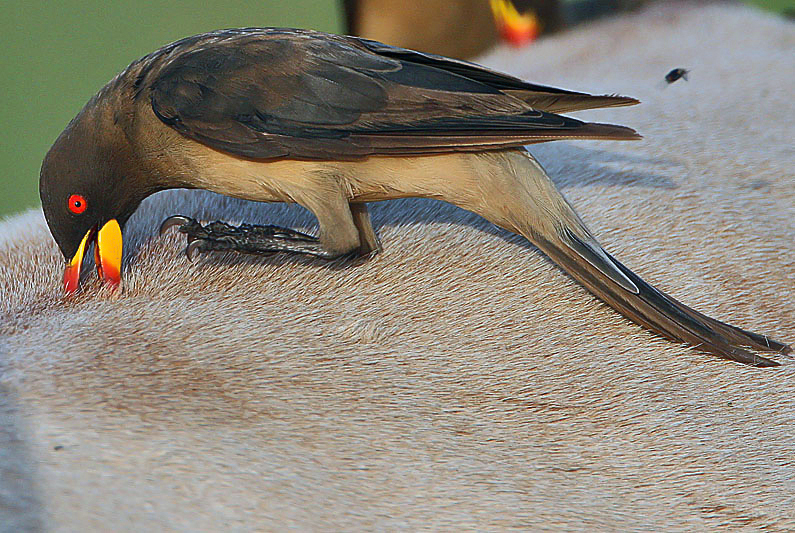
Yellow-billed oxpecker (Buphagus africanus) foraging on a living animal

An unusual feeding strategy is that of the oxpeckers of Africa. They perch on living animals and glean parasites from the animals' hides. On furry animals, such as buffalo, giraffe, and donkey, these birds run their bills through the fur of the animal, using a scissors-like motion to extract ticks and lice from near the skin. When they pull the insect out to the end of the fur, they catch it and eat it. (On animals with bare hides, such as rhinoceros and hippopotamus, oxpeckers pick at any open wounds the animals happen to have, consuming blood and pus, and possibly keeping the wounds free of maggots.) Historically, rhinoceros and other large wild mammals have been among the favored hosts, but as the populations of large mammals in the African savanna have declined in modern times, the population and range of both red-billed and yellow-billed oxpecker have also changed, and now the birds will use donkeys and domestic cattle as hosts.

There are other tactics. Dippers forage underwater in fast-moving streams. Common grackles have been observed to follow farmers’ plows to glean the grubs exposed in the fresh soil. Similarly, on the island of Borneo, the Bornean ground-cuckoo will follow wild pigs and sun bears as they turn up soil while foraging in the forest. Brewer's blackbirds are often seen in parking lots, where they pick off dead insects from car grilles. Some hummingbirds are known to take prey items from spiderwebs.

== Behavioral implications ==
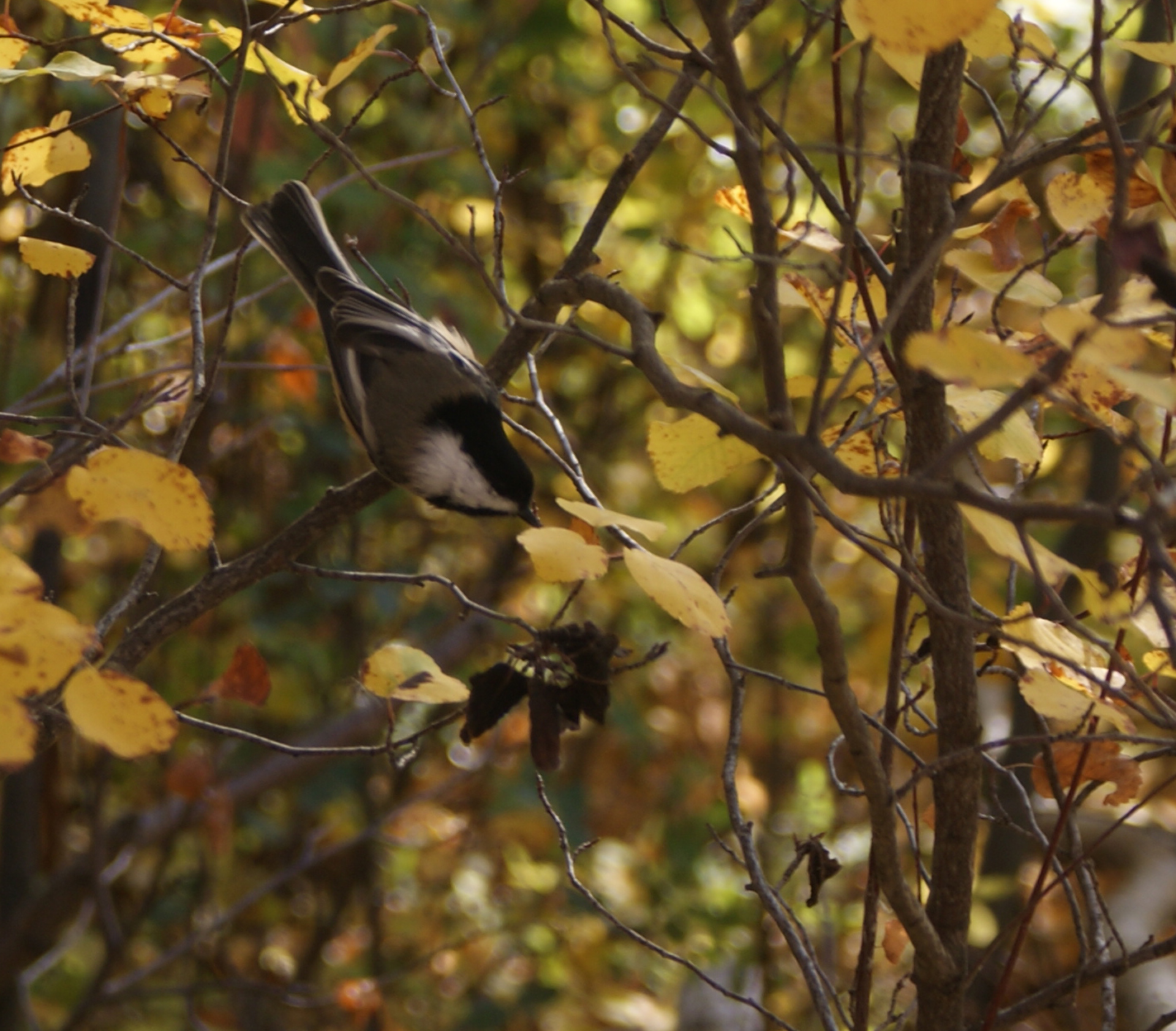
Black-capped chickadee (Poecile atricapillus) inspecting foliage

Gleaning, like other methods of foraging, is a highly visual activity, and as such has some implications for birds. First, to see requires light, and thus time allotted to gleaning is limited to daytime. Second, while a bird focuses on examining an area for prey items, it must necessarily divert its attention from scanning its surroundings for predators. Birds that glean in tree branches will often join together in a flock, and often with other gleaners in a mixed-species foraging flock. It has been shown that individual birds feeding in flocks are able to spend more time looking for food and less time looking for predators.

On the other hand, it is not a universal trait of gleaning birds to join with other species or even to be gregarious with their own kind. The leafbirds of Asia are foliage-gleaners, but are often found singly or in pairs. Also, where multiple species of gleaning birds forage in the same area, they may show niche segregation; for example, one species may stick to conifers while another species inhabits broadleaf trees, or they may even divide up a habitat, with smaller species feeding among higher, smaller tree branches and larger species staying on lower, larger branches.
