= Pygmy tyrant =

Pygmy tyrants are found in the following genera:

- Euscarthmus
- Myiornis
- Lophotriccus
- Atalotriccus
