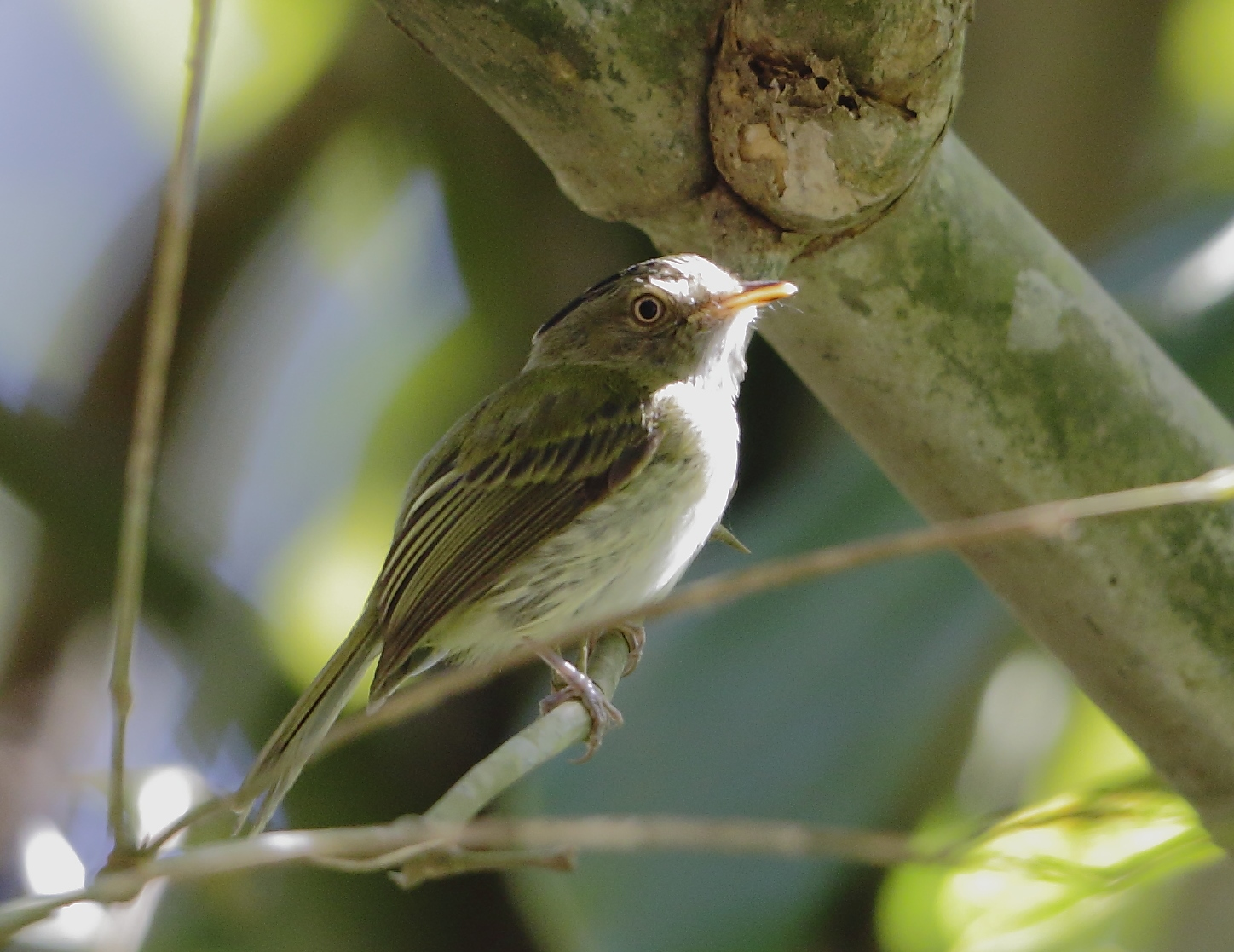
- Long-crested pygmy tyrant at Rio Branco, Acre, Brazil

Conservation status
- Least Concern (IUCN 3.1)

Scientific classification
- Kingdom: Animalia
- Phylum: Chordata
- Class: Aves
- Order: Passeriformes
- Family: Tyrannidae
- Genus: Lophotriccus
- Species: L. eulophotes

Binomial name
- Lophotriccus eulophotes Todd, 1925

= Long-crested pygmy tyrant =

Species of bird

The long-crested pygmy tyrant (Lophotriccus eulophotes) is a species of bird in the family Tyrannidae, the tyrant flycatchers. It is found in the western Amazon Basin of Bolivia, Brazil and Peru.

== Taxonomy and systematics ==
The long-crested pygmy tyrant has had the binomial Lophotriccus eulophotes since it was originally described in 1925. It is monotypic. However, several early twentieth century authors treated it and what is now the double-banded pygmy tyrant (L. vitiosus) as conspecific. In addition, several authors have suggested that genus Lophotriccus should be merged into genus Hemitriccus.

== Description ==
The long-crested pygmy tyrant is 10 to 10.5 cm (3.9 to 4.1 in) long and weighs 6.5 to 8 g (0.23 to 0.28 oz). The sexes have the same plumage. Adults have long black crown feathers with gray edges. They form the eponymous crest that it sometimes erects and fans; they extend beyond the rear of the head when folded. Adults have whitish lores on an otherwise olive face. Their back, rump, and uppertail coverts are olive. Their wings are dusky with olive tips on the coverts; the latter show very weakly as two wing bars. Their tail is dusky. Their throat and underparts are whitish with gray streaks. They have a whitish yellow iris, a gray bill, and dull pinkish legs and feet.

== Distribution and habitat ==
The long-crested pygmy tyrant is a bird of the southwestern Amazon Basin. It is found in the upper Purus River basin of far western Brazil, the Ucayali and Madre de Dios river basins in southeastern Peru, and Pando Department in far northern Bolivia. It primarily inhabits forest along the rivers where it favors its edge, openings such as those caused by fallen trees, and stands of Guadua bamboo. It also occurs in mature secondary forest, especially along roads. In elevation it reaches only 400 m (1,300 ft) above sea level.

== Behavior ==
=== Movement ===
The long-crested pygmy tyrant is a year-round resident.

=== Feeding ===
The long-crested pygmy tyrant feeds on insects. It mostly forages between about 4 and 10 m (15 and 35 ft) above the forest floor and occasionally joins mixed-species feeding flocks. It takes prey mostly by using short upward sallies from a perch to grab it from leaves.

=== Breeding ===
Nothing is known about the long-crested pygmy tyrant's breeding biology.

=== Vocalization ===
The long-crested pygmy tyrant's song is "an accelerating and falling series of ringing notes: pit-pit-pit-pit-piteeeeerrr". Its primary call is "single pip notes, often in [a] loose series". It also makes "several pip notes in a rising-falling series".

== Status ==
The IUCN has assessed the long-crested pygmy tyrant as being of Least Concern. It has a large range; its population size is not known and is believed to be decreasing. No immediate threats have been identified. It is considered "uncommon to fairly common, but local". It occurs in at least two nominally protected areas in Peru. However, "mining, oil extraction and other development schemes, coupled with associated road-building and human intrusion, pose serious future threats; even the integrity of large protected areas such as Manu National Park and Biosphere Reserve and Tambopata-Candamo Reserved Zone is not assured".
