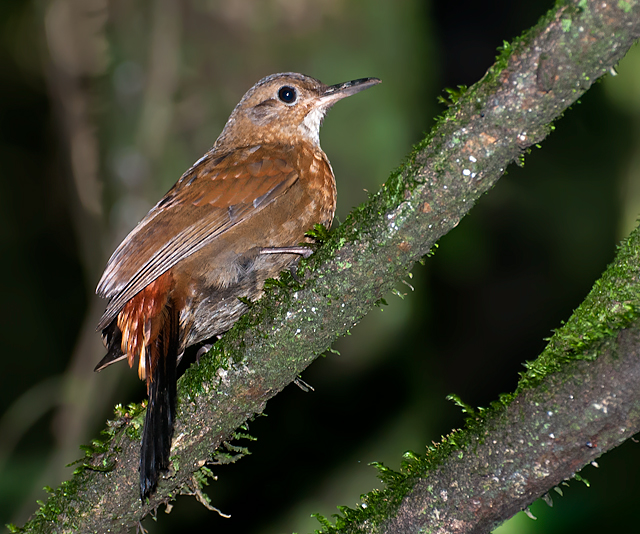
- at Serra da Cantareira State Park, São Paulo State, Brazil

Conservation status
- Least Concern (IUCN 3.1)

- Vulnerable (IUCN 3.1)

Scientific classification
- Kingdom: Animalia
- Phylum: Chordata
- Class: Aves
- Order: Passeriformes
- Family: Furnariidae
- Genus: Sclerurus
- Species: S. scansor

Binomial name
- Sclerurus scansor (Ménétries, 1835)

= Rufous-breasted leaftosser =

Species of bird

The rufous-breasted leaftosser (Sclerurus scansor) is a species of bird in the subfamily Sclerurinae, the leaftossers and miners, of the ovenbird family Furnariidae. It is found in Argentina, Brazil, and Paraguay.

== Taxonomy and systematics ==
The rufous-breasted leaftosser's taxonomy is unsettled. The International Ornithological Committee (IOC) and the Clements taxonomy assign it two subspecies, the nominate S. s. scansor (Ménétries, 1835) and S. s. cearensis (Snethlage, E, 1924). BirdLife International's Handbook of the Birds of the World (HBW) treats the taxa as two separate species, the rufous-breasted leaftosser sensu stricto and the Ceara leaftosser S. cearensis. The South American Classification Committee of the American Ornithological Society also does not recognize the "Ceara leaftosser" but does not address subspecies within the rufous-breasted.

The rufous-breasted and grey-throated leaftosser (S. albigularis) are sister species.

This article follows the one species, two-subspecies model.

== Description ==
The rufous-breasted leaftosser is one of the larger members of genus Sclerurus. It is 17.5 to 20.1 cm (6.9 to 7.9 in) long and weighs 30 to 41 g (1.1 to 1.4 oz). The sexes are alike. The nominate subspecies has a dark brownish face with a somewhat grizzled appearance. Its crown is very dark brown with blackish scalloping. Its back is rich dark brown, its rump bright chestnut, and its uppertail coverts chestnut with reddish brown tips. Its wings are dark reddish brown and its tail is sooty blackish with some faint red-brown. Its throat is pale grayish white with dusky scaling and its upper breast dull rufescent brown with a scaly appearance. It has a wide ochraceous chestnut band across the middle of its breast. Its belly and flanks are dark olivaceous brown with chestnut tones and its undertail coverts are similar with richer chestnut. Its iris is dark brown, its maxilla black, its mandible black with a whitish base, and its legs and feed blackish brown. Juveniles resemble adults but are overall darker.

Subspecies S. s. cearensis is slightly smaller than the nominate. It has a clear white unscaled throat and slightly brighter upper- and underparts.

== Distribution and habitat ==
The nominate subspecies of the rufous-breasted leaftosser is found from central Brazil's Mato Grosso, Goiás, and Minas Gerais states south into Rio Grande do Sul and through eastern Paraguay into northeastern Argentina's Misiones Province. It mostly inhabits lowland tropical rainforest and montane evergreen forest, and also occurs in mature secondary forest. In elevation it ranges from near sea level to 1,600 m (5,200 ft).

The "Ceara" subspecies of the rufous-breasted leaftosser is found separately in northeastern Brazil between Ceará and Bahia. It inhabits the interior understorey in enclaves of brejos de altitude (humid relict forest) within the drier Caatinga. In elevation it ranges between 550 and 1,050 m (1,800 and 3,400 ft).

== Behavior ==
=== Movement ===
The nominate subspecies of the rufous-breasted leaftosser is a year-round resident throughout its range and the "Ceara" subspecies is assumed to be also.

=== Feeding ===
The nominate subspecies of rufous-breasted leaftosser forages mostly on the ground, flipping aside leaves, probing the ground and gleaning from it and leaf litter while hopping rather than walking. It usually forages singly, occasionally in pairs, and sometimes joins mixed-species foraging flocks. Its diet has not been detailed but has been documented to include beetles, spiders, and true bugs. The "Ceara" subspecies' diet has not been documented but is assumed to be mostly arthropods. It is assumed to forage in the same manner as the nominate.

=== Breeding ===
The breeding season of the rufous-breasted leaftosser's nominate subspecies is thought to be in the austral spring and summer. It nests in a burrow with a cup of leaves in a chamber at its end; the burrow may be in an earthen bank or in the root ball of a fallen tree. The clutch size is two or three eggs. Nothing is known about the breeding biology of the "Ceara" leaftosser.

== Vocalization ==
The voices of the two rufous-breasted leaftosser subspecies differ. The song of the nominate is a "[s]harp, metallic, descending trill" that sometimes ends with a chatter and also sometimes starts or ends with "tsik, tsik" notes. Its call is "a loud 'spix, spix-spix-spix'." The "Ceara"'s song is "a fast rattle followed by a series of piping overslurred whistles".

== Status ==
The IUCN follows HBW taxonomy and so has separately assessed the rufous-breasted leaftosser sensu stricto and the "Ceara" leaftosser.

The nominate is assessed as being of Least Concern. It has a large range but its population size is not known and is believed to be decreasing. No immediate threats have been identified. It is considered rare to locally fairly common and occurs in many protected areas. However, its range has been extensively deforested and "even selective logging leads to a marked reduction in its abundance."

The "Ceara" leaftosser is assessed as Vulnerable. It has a somewhat restricted range and an unknown population size that is believed to be decreasing. Its forest habitat has been much reduced and fragmented, and clearance continues. The species is thought to be "intolerant of any habitat alteration". It is thought to occupy less than 2,000 km^{2} (770 sq mi) within its nominal 658,000 km^{2} (254,000 sq mi) range. It does occur in a few protected areas.
