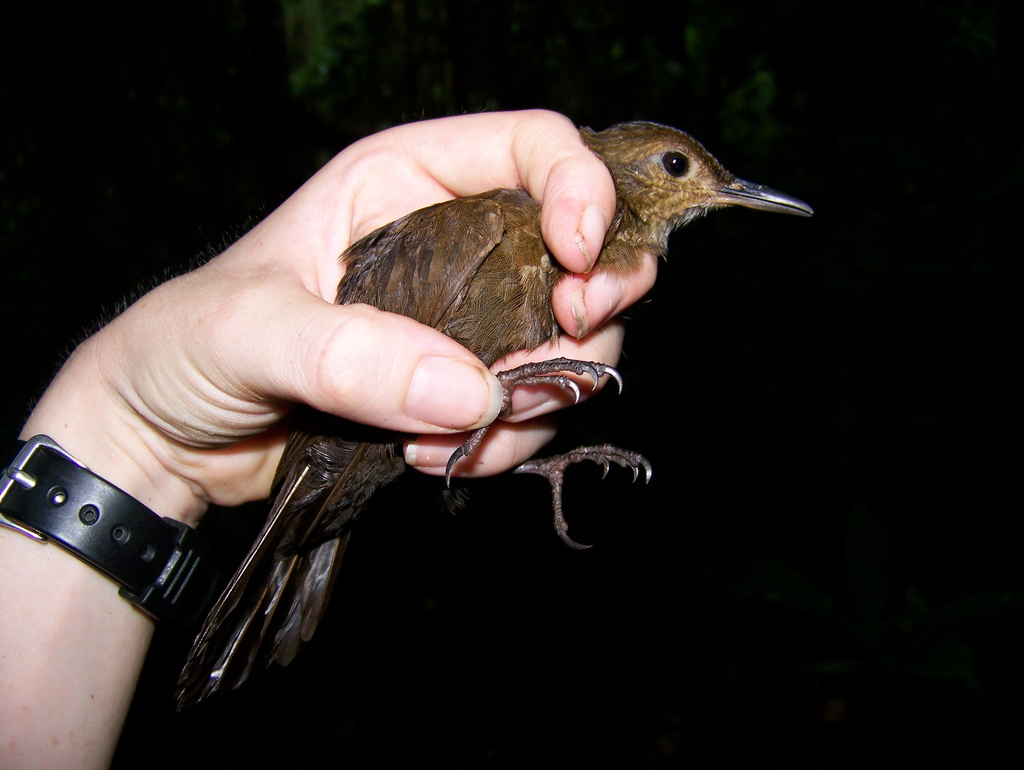

Conservation status
- Least Concern (IUCN 3.1)

Scientific classification
- Kingdom: Animalia
- Phylum: Chordata
- Class: Aves
- Order: Passeriformes
- Family: Furnariidae
- Genus: Sclerurus
- Species: S. caudacutus

Binomial name
- Sclerurus caudacutus (Vieillot, 1816)

= Black-tailed leaftosser =

Species of bird

The black-tailed leaftosser (Sclerurus caudacutus) is a species of bird in the subfamily Sclerurinae, the leaftossers and miners, of the ovenbird family Furnariidae. It is found in Bolivia, Brazil, Colombia, Ecuador, French Guiana, Guyana, Peru, Suriname, and Venezuela.

== Taxonomy and systematics ==
The black-tailed leaftosser's taxonomy is unsettled. The International Ornithological Committee (IOC) and BirdLife International's Handbook of the Birds of the World (HBW) assign it these six subspecies:

- S. c. caudacutus (Vieillot, 1816)
- S. c. insignis Zimmer, J.T., 1934
- S. c. brunneus Sclater, P.L., 1857
- S. c. pallidus Zimmer, J.T., 1934
- S. c. umbretta (Lichtenstein, M.H.C., 1823)
- S. c. caligineus Pinto, 1954

The Clements taxonomy does not recognize S. c. caligineus but includes S. c. olivascens, which the Cornell Lab of Ornithology's online Birds of the World states "probably represents clinal variation within brunneus".

The black-tailed and scaly-throated leaftossers (S. guatemalensis) are sister species.

== Description ==
The black-tailed leaftosser is the darkest and dullest member of genus Sclerurus. It is 16 to 18 cm (6.3 to 7.1 in) long and weighs 34 to 42 g (1.2 to 1.5 oz). The sexes are alike. The nominate subspecies S. c. caudacutus has a dark rufescent face with a faint scallop effect on its malar. Its crown is dark brown with a slight scalloped appearance. Its back, rump, and uppertail coverts are very dark reddish brown. Its tail is sooty blackish, though not significantly blacker than those of other leaftossers, and has some faint dark reddish brown. It wings are dark reddish brown. Its throat is whitish, its breast dark rufescent, and the rest of its underparts blackish brown. Its iris is brown to dark brown, its bill is long and straight with a black to blackish brown maxilla and a bicolored mandible, and its legs and feet are black to dark brown. Juveniles are slightly darker than adults and have a smaller whitish area on the throat.

Subspecies S. c. insignis is similar to the nominate but has duller upperparts that are less rufous. S. c. brunneus is somewhat variable but generally slightly paler than the nominate, somewhat olivaceous, has a duller throat, and sometimes has a reddish tinge to its legs. S. c. pallidus is paler than the nominate; its white throat feathers have dusky tips, and its face and breast are ochraceous brown rather than dark brown. S. c. umbretta is similar to the nominate but has pure white throat feathers with dusky tips, a duller and less rufescent chest, and a browner lower breast and belly. S. c. caligineus is overall darker than the nominate.

== Distribution and habitat ==
The descriptions of the various subspecies' distribution are complicated by the different taxonomic approaches of the IOC and Clements, and further complicated by the account in Cornell's Birds of the World.

According to the IOC, the subspecies of the black-tailed leaftosser are found thus:

- S. c. caudacutus, the Guianas
- S. c. insignis, southern Venezuela and northern Brazil
- S. c. brunneus, from southeastern Colombia south through eastern Ecuador to eastern Peru and east into western Amazonian Brazil and northern Bolivia
- S. c. pallidus, north central Brazil south of the Amazon
- S. c. umbretta, southern Amazonian Brazil
- S. c. caligineus, eastern Brazil

According to Clements, the subspecies in its list are distributed thus:

- S. c. caudacutus, the Guianas
- S. c. insignis, "S Venezuela (Amazonas and Bolívar) and adjacent n Brazil"
- S. c. brunneus, from southeastern Colombia south through eastern Ecuador to Peru and east into western Amazonian Brazil (excluding IOC's Bolivia)
- S. c. olivascens, "E Peru (Ayacucho) to extreme n Bolivia (Pando)"
- S. c. pallidus, northern Brazil south of the Amazon between the Madeira and Capim rivers
- S. c. umbretta, coastal eastern Brazil between Alagoas and Espírito Santo

Cornell's Birds of the World uses the Clements taxonomy, but has somewhat different range descriptions:

- S. c. caudacutus, the Guianas and the north-central Brazilian state of Amapá
- S. c. insignis, northern Brazil north of the Amazon River in northwestern Pará and "perhaps more widespread"
- S. c. brunneus, (as Clements) from southeastern Colombia south through eastern Ecuador to Peru and east into western Amazonian Brazil
- S. c. olivascens, (as Clements) "E Peru (Ayacucho) to extreme n Bolivia (Pando)"
- S. c. pallidus, central Brazil south of the Amazon between the Madeira River and western Maranhão
- S. c. umbretta, (as Clements) coastal eastern Brazil between Alagoas and Espírito Santo

The black-tailed leaftosser inhabits lowland tropical terra firme evergreen forest. In elevation it ranges from near sea level up to 1,100 m (3,600 ft) in Brazil and Venezuela, is mostly below 500 m (1,600 ft) but locally to 950 m (3,100 ft) in Ecuador, and is found up to 500 m (1,600 ft) in Colombia.

== Behavior ==
=== Movement ===
The black-tailed leaftosser is a year-round resident throughout its range.

=== Feeding ===
The black-tailed leaftosser forages mostly on the ground, flipping aside leaves, probing the ground and gleaning from it and leaf litter while hopping rather than walking. It usually forages singly or in pairs. Its diet of invertebrates includes cockroach eggs, beetles, ants, and annelid worms. There is also one record of a bird feeding on fallen fruit.

=== Breeding ===
The black-tailed leaftosser's breeding season includes June in Peru but is otherwise unknown. It nests in a burrow with a cup of leaves in a chamber at its end. The burrow is typically excavated in an earthen bank. The clutch size is two eggs; both parents provision nestlings.

=== Vocalization ===
The black-tailed leaftosser's song is "a series of 10–12 loud, ringing, descending 'kweet' or 'whee' notes" that is usually started with a "low sputtering trill". Its call is "a sharp 'skweeup' ".

== Status ==
The IUCN has assessed the black-tailed leaftosser as being of Least Concern. It has a very large range but its population size is not known and is believed to be decreasing. No immediate threats have been identified. It is considered uncommon to locally common across its range and occurs in several protected areas. It shuns fragmented and selectively logged forest.
