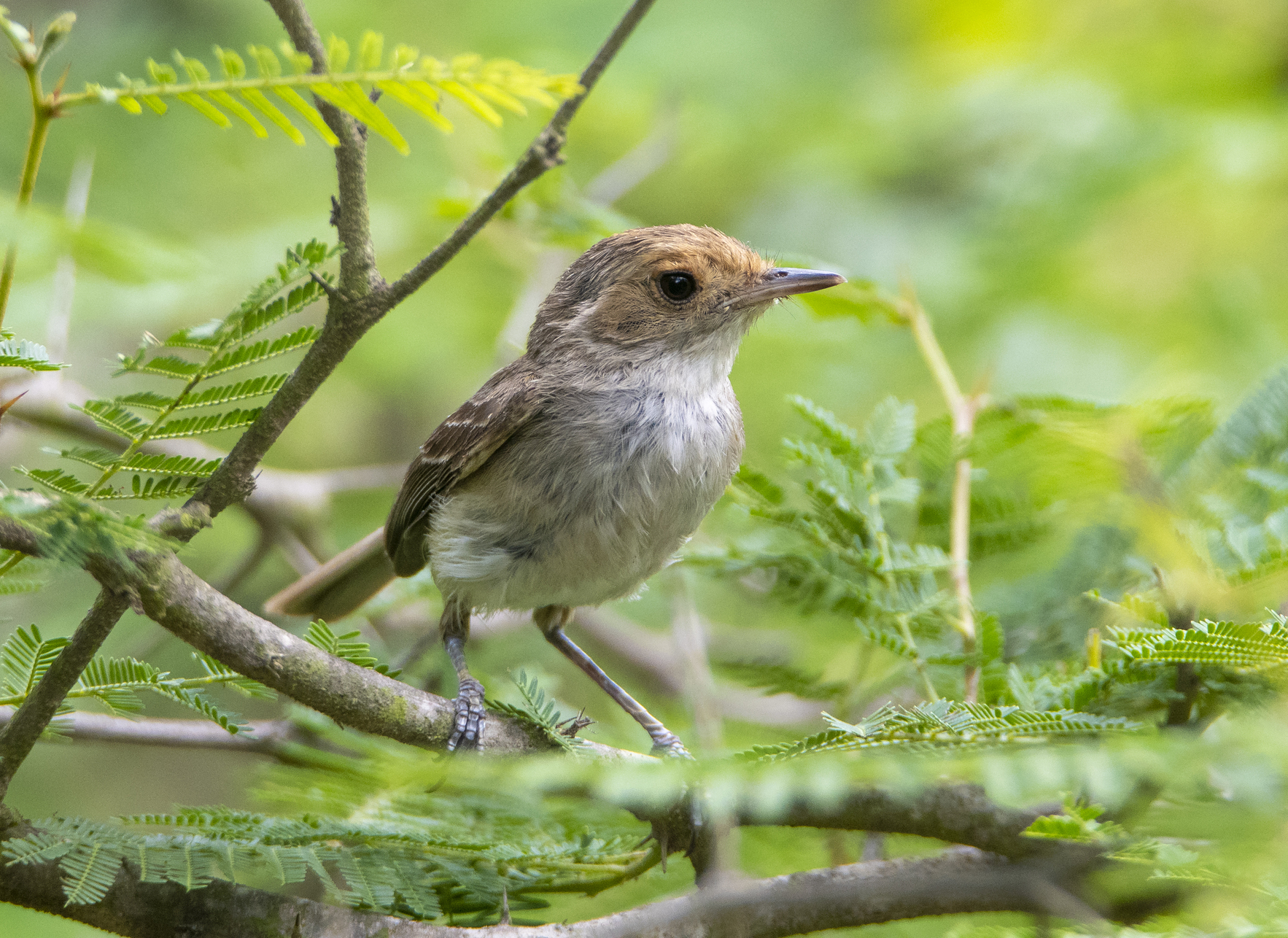

Conservation status
- Least Concern (IUCN 3.1)

Scientific classification
- Kingdom: Animalia
- Phylum: Chordata
- Class: Aves
- Order: Passeriformes
- Family: Tyrannidae
- Genus: Euscarthmus
- Species: E. fulviceps

Binomial name
- Euscarthmus fulviceps Sclater, PL, 1871

Synonyms
- Euscarthmus meloryphus fulviceps

= Fulvous-faced scrub tyrant =

Species of bird

The fulvous-faced scrub tyrant, or tawny-fronted pygmy-tyrant (Euscarthmus fulviceps) is a species of bird in the family Tyrannidae, the tyrant flycatchers. It is found in Ecuador, Peru, and possibly Colombia.

== Taxonomy and systematics ==
What is now the fulvous-faced scrub tyrant was previously a subspecies of what was then the tawny-crowned pygmy tyrant (E. meloryphus). After the split most taxonomic systems renamed its former parent the fulvous-crowned scrub tyrant and gave this species its current common name to avoid confusion with the pre-split species and other, unrelated, species called "pygmy tyrants". However, as of late 2024 BirdLife International's Handbook of the Birds of the World retains the original common name for E. meloryphus and calls this species the tawny-fronted pygmy-tyrant.

The fulvous-faced scrub tyrant is monotypic.

== Description ==
The fulvous-faced scrub tyrant is 10 to 12 cm (3.9 to 4.7 in) long and weighs 5.3 to 7.6 g (0.19 to 0.27 oz). The sexes have the same plumage. Adults have a cinnamon brown crown with a weak crest and a small rufous central crown patch that is somewhat hidden. Their face is mostly fulvous. Their upperparts are cinnamon brown. Their wings are a slightly dusky cinnamon brown with buffy white tips on the coverts that show as two prominent wing bars. Their tail is also a slightly dusky cinnamon brown. Their throat is whitish and their breast pale cream that sometimes has a grayish olive wash. The rest of their underparts are a yellower cream. Both sexes have a brown iris, a dark brown maxilla, a pale pinkish mandible, and pale bluish gray legs and feet with whitish soles on the latter.

== Distribution and habitat ==
The fulvous-faced scrub tyrant is found from west-central Esmeraldas Province in northern Ecuador south into Peru. There its range extends on the western slope of the Andes south to Lima Department and further east, south up the valley of the Marañón River at least to Huánuco Department. At least one unconfirmed sight record in Colombia leads the South American Classification Committee of the American Ornithological Society to call it hypothetical in that country. It inhabits somewhat dry deciduous woodlands and forest, arid scrublands, and shrubby clearings in the tropical lowlands. In Ecuador it mostly occurs below 1,500 m (4,900 ft) but reaches 2,000 m (6,600 ft) in the south. In Peru it ranges up to 2,500 m (8,200 ft).

== Behavior ==
=== Movement ===
The fulvous-faced scrub tyrant is believed to be a year-round resident though some local movements during the dry season in Ecuador are suspected.

=== Feeding ===
The fulvous-faced scrub tyrant's diet has not been detailed but is assumed to be mostly small arthropods. It forages on and near the ground in dense vegetation, typically singly or in pairs, and usually not with mixed-species feeding flocks. It takes most food by gleaning while perched and also briefly hovers after a short upward flight to pick food from vegetation.

=== Breeding ===
Almost all of the information on the fulvous-faced scrub tyrant's breeding biology comes from Ecuador. There it breeds mostly between March and June. Its nest is an open cup very loosely made from small sticks and plant stems and slung between twigs in a dense shrub, though often at the shrub's outer edges. Twenty nests ranged between 0.5 and 1.7 m (2 and 6 ft) above the ground. The typical clutch is two eggs that are buffy white with darker spots. The incubation period appears to be about 15 days, and the female alone is thought to incubate. The time to fledging and details of parental care are not known.

=== Vocalization ===
The fulvous-faced scrub tyrant's song has been described as "a repeated, fast 're-tr-tr-tr-tr-tr-trreétrrrt' " and its call as "an oft-repeated, fast, and explosive 'plee-titik' or 'plee-ti-re-tik' ". Another description of the song is "a series of grinding, musical phrases, the final note rising: pit-pit-pit gri-gree-GREE" and of the call "a thin series of piping or bubbling notes: ptee-pee-pew or pitter-pittew".

== Status ==
The IUCN has assessed the fulvous-faced scrub tyrant as being of Least Concern. It has a large range; its population size is not known and is believed to be increasing. No immediate threats have been identified. It is considered common in Ecuador and fairly common in Peru. It is found in several protected areas in both countries and "thrives in secondary and modified habitats, actually benefiting from forest clearance and occupying the resultant scrubby areas".
