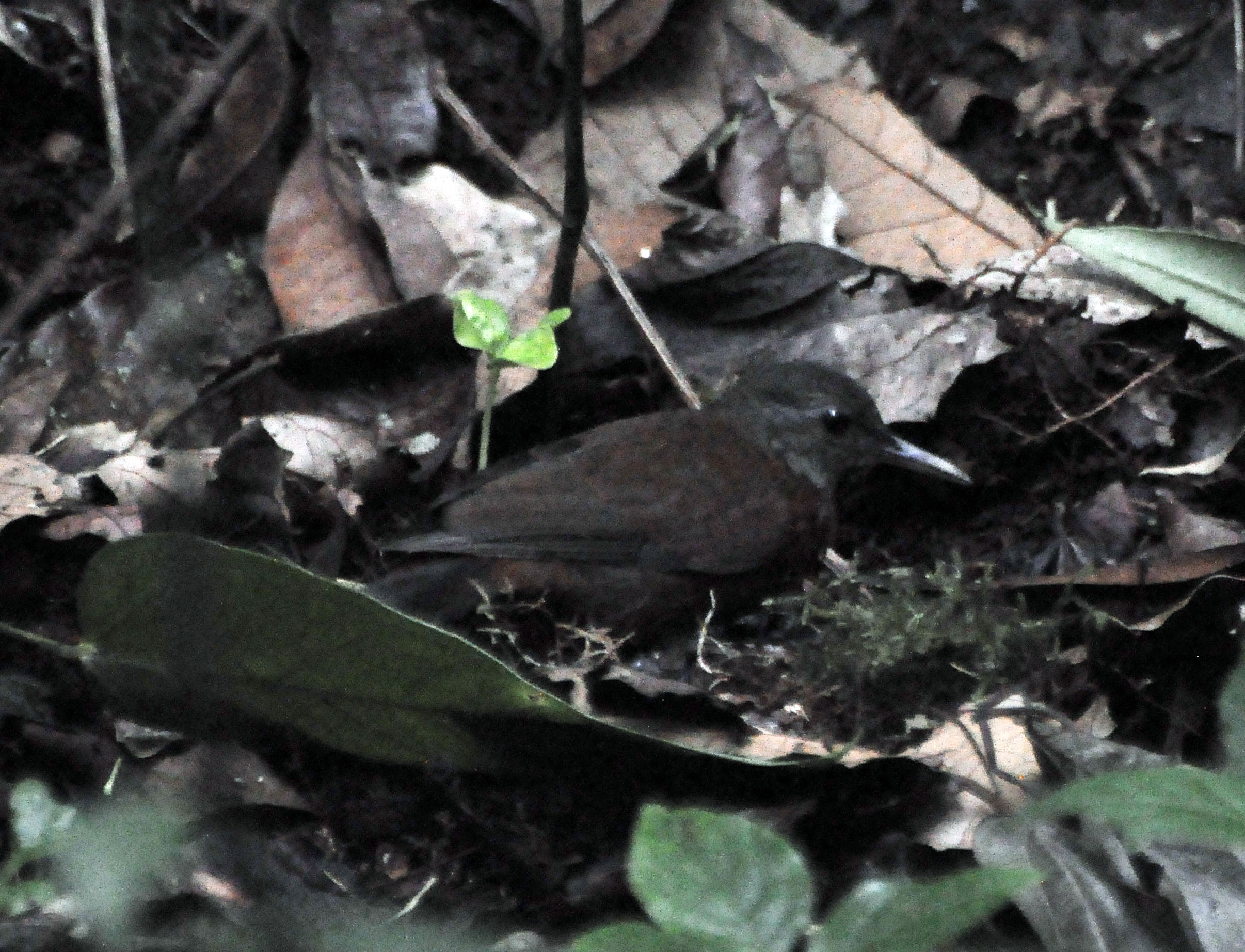

Conservation status
- Least Concern (IUCN 3.1)

Scientific classification
- Kingdom: Animalia
- Phylum: Chordata
- Class: Aves
- Order: Passeriformes
- Family: Furnariidae
- Genus: Sclerurus
- Species: S. albigularis

Binomial name
- Sclerurus albigularis Sclater, PL & Salvin, 1869

Audio
- Song of grey-throated leaftosser

= Grey-throated leaftosser =

Species of bird

The grey-throated leaftosser (Sclerurus albigularis) is a Near Threatened species of bird in the subfamily Sclerurinae, the leaftossers and miners, of the ovenbird family Furnariidae. It is found in Bolivia, Brazil, Colombia, Costa Rica, Ecuador, Panama, Peru, Trinidad and Tobago, and Venezuela.

== Taxonomy and systematics ==
The grey-throated leaftosser's taxonomy is unsettled. The International Ornithological Committee (IOC) and the Clements taxonomy assign it these seven subspecies:

- Sclerurus albigularis canigularis Ridgway, 1889
- Sclerurus albigularis propinquus Bangs, 1899
- Sclerurus albigularis albigularis Sclater, PL & Salvin, 1869
- Sclerurus albigularis kunanensis Aveledo & Ginés, 1950
- Sclerurus albigularis zamorae Chapman, 1923
- Sclerurus albigularis albicollis Carriker, 1935
- Sclerurus albigularis kempffi Kratter, 1997

BirdLife International's Handbook of the Birds of the World (HBW) does not recognize S. a. kunanensis. That subspecies might not be distinguishable from the nominate S. a. albigularis.

The grey-throated and rufous-breasted leaftosser (S. scansor) are sister species.

This article follows the seven-subspecies model.

== Description ==
The grey-throated leaftosser is one of the larger members of genus Sclerurus. It is 16 to 18 cm (6.3 to 7.1 in) long and weighs 34 to 46 g (1.2 to 1.6 oz). The sexes are alike. The nominate subspecies has a grayish brown face with a somewhat scaly appearance. Its crown and back are rich chestnut-brown and its rump and uppertail coverts are a brighter reddish chestnut. Its flight feathers are rich brown and its tail is dark gray-brown. Its throat is grayish white with a darker lower edge, its breast dark rufous with some pale streaks, its belly dark brown, and its flanks and undertail coverts a richer brown. Its iris is dark brown to brown, its maxilla black to dark gray, its mandible pale grayish white to yellowish (sometimes with a dark tip), and its legs and feed black to brown. Juveniles resemble adults but are overall duller and have some dusky scaling on the throat.

Subspecies S. a. propinquus has darker upperparts, breast, and belly than the nominate, and its throat is grayer. S. a. canigularis is generally darker than propinquus but its rufous cast is brighter than on both propinquus and the nominate. S. a. zamorae is generally darker than the nominate, with duller chestnut rump and uppertail coverts, a less whitish chin, and a brighter upper breast. S. a. albicollis has brighter and more rufescent upperparts than the other subspecies; its uppertail coverts are especially rich rufous. It has paler underparts than most others and a white throat. S. a. kempffi is the palest subspecies, with a grayer breast and belly and less reddish upper breast and back than the others. Its rump is the same color as its back. Some authors state that S. a. kunanensis has a somewhat greenish olive belly, some olive on its flight feathers, and a blackish tail but others find no difference between it and the nominate.

== Distribution and habitat ==
The grey-throated leaftosser has a disjunct distribution. The subspecies are found thus:

- Sclerurus albigularis canigularis, Costa Rica and western Panama
- Sclerurus albigularis propinquus, the Sierra Nevada de Santa Marta of northern Colombia
- Sclerurus albigularis albigularis, eastern Colombia, northern Venezuela, Trinidad, and Tobago
- Sclerurus albigularis kunanensis, northern Venezuela's Paria Peninsula
- Sclerurus albigularis zamorae, from Napo Province in eastern Ecuador south to Peru's Department of Pasco
- Sclerurus albigularis albicollis, disjunctly in southeastern Peru, the eastern Andean foothills in Bolivia, and several areas in southwestern Brazil
- Sclerurus albigularis kempffi, the Serranía de Huanchaca in Bolivia's Santa Cruz Department

The grey-throated leaftosser inhabits evergreen forest, usually in foothills and lower montane areas, though in places it ranges both higher and lower. In the northeastern part of its range it approaches sea level and in Brazil it is strictly in the lowlands. In Costa Rica it occurs between 600 and 1,500 m (2,000 and 4,900 ft) of elevation, in Colombia between 500 and 2,200 m (1,600 and 7,200 ft), and in Ecuador mostly between 1,000 and 1,700 m (3,300 and 5,600 ft).

== Behavior ==
=== Movement ===
The grey-throated leaftosser is a year-round resident throughout its range.

=== Feeding ===
The grey-throated leaftosser forages mostly on the ground, flipping aside leaves, probing the ground and gleaning from it and leaf litter while hopping rather than walking. It usually forages singly or in pairs; it does not join mixed-species foraging flocks. Its diet has not been detailed but has been documented to include beetles, spiders, cockroaches, and tiny frogs.

=== Breeding ===
The grey-throated leaftosser breeds between October and May in Trinidad and its season in Colombia includes at least May and June; its breeding seasons elsewhere have not been documented. The species is assumed to be monogamous. It nests in a burrow with a cup of leaves in a chamber at its end. The clutch size is two eggs.

=== Vocalization ===
The grey-throated leaftosser's song is "a series of 4–6 tripled rising notes, 'kwu-kwu-kwe-kwe-kwi-kwi' " that sometimes has "musical trills" within it and at the end. Another description of it is "squeaky, plaintive, ascending, whistled notes, 'tuéé, tuéé, tuéé, tweééptu'." Its alarm call is "a squeaky, sharp 'cheek' or 'chik-chik'."

== Status ==
The IUCN originally assessed the grey-throated leaftosser as being of Least Concern but since 2012 has rated it Near Threatened. It has a fairly large but disjunct range and an unknown population size; the latter is believed to be stable. It is "particularly susceptible" to forest fragmentation and disturbance so deforestation is the principal threat. It is overall considered rare to locally uncommon, though locally fairly common in Venezuela. It does occur in several protected areas.
