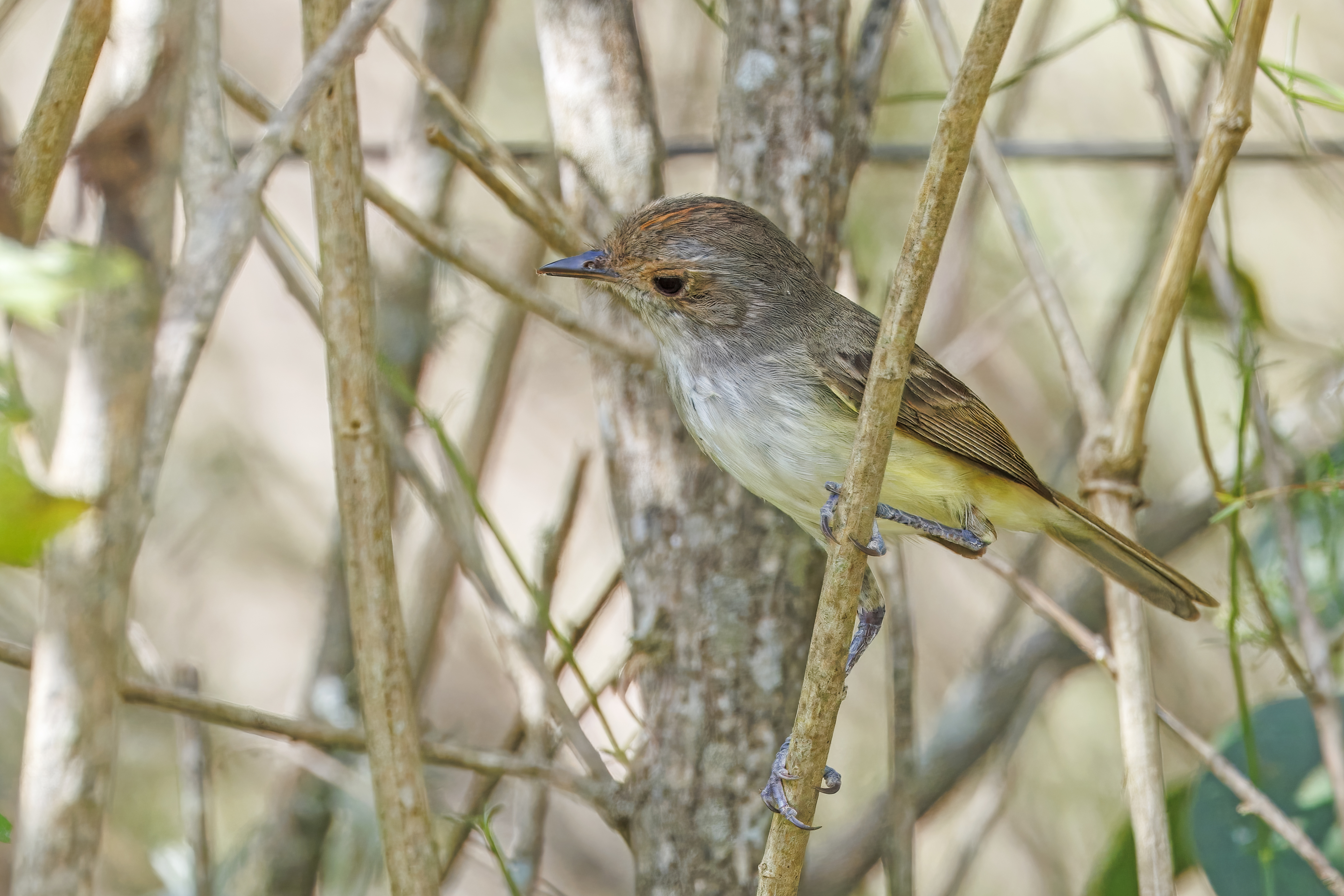
- C. m. meloryphus in Colonia del Sacramento, Uruguay

Conservation status
- Least Concern (IUCN 3.1)

Scientific classification
- Kingdom: Animalia
- Phylum: Chordata
- Class: Aves
- Order: Passeriformes
- Family: Tyrannidae
- Genus: Euscarthmus
- Species: E. meloryphus

Binomial name
- Euscarthmus meloryphus Wied, 1831

= Fulvous-crowned scrub tyrant =

Species of bird

The fulvous-crowned scrub tyrant, or tawny-crowned pygmy-tyrant, (Euscarthmus meloryphus) is a species of bird in the family Tyrannidae, the tyrant flycatchers. It is found in Argentina, Bolivia, Brazil, Colombia, Paraguay, Peru, Uruguay, and Venezuela.

== Taxonomy and systematics ==
The fulvous-crowned scrub tyrant has two subspecies, the nominate E. m. meloryphus (Wied, 1831) and E. m. paulus (Bangs, 1899).

What is now the fulvous-faced scrub tyrant (E. fulviceps) was previously a third subspecies; the full species at that time was called the tawny-crowned pygmy tyrant. Following the split most taxonomic systems gave E. meloryphus sensu stricto its present common name to avoid confusion with the pre-split species and other, unrelated, species called "pygmy tyrants". However, as of late 2024 BirdLife International's Handbook of the Birds of the World retains the original common name.

== Description ==
The fulvous-crowned scrub tyrant is 9 to 12 cm (3.5 to 4.7 in) long and weighs 5 to 10 g (0.18 to 0.35 oz). The sexes have the same plumage. Adults of the nominate subspecies have a drab brownish crown with a weak crest and rufous central crown feathers that are somewhat hidden. They have dull buffy to whitish lores and an indistinct dull buffy to whitish eye-ring on an otherwise buffy brown face. Their upperparts are drab brownish. Their wings are dusky brown with rufous tips on the coverts and less distinct rufous edges on the flight feathers. Their tail is dusky. Their throat and breast are grayish white with a brownish tinge on the sides of the breast and flanks. The rest of their underparts are creamy yellow. Subspecies E. m. paulus is very similar to the nominate but with a fulvous to buffy face. Both sexes of both subspecies have a medium brown to chestnut or cinnamon iris, a black maxilla, a mandible that can be grayish to white, pale brownish pink, or all plumbeous gray, and legs and feet that can be any of several shades of gray.

== Distribution and habitat ==
The fulvous-crowned scrub tyrant has a disjunct distribution; the two subspecies are widely separated. The nominate subspecies is the more southern and has the larger range. It is found in Brazil from Maranhão and Ceará south to Mato Grosso and Rio Grande do Sul and from there west into northern and eastern Bolivia and extreme southeastern Peru and south through eastern Paraguay and Uruguay into Argentina. In northwestern Argentina it is found as far south as Tucumán Province and in the east to Córdoba and northern Buenos Aires provinces. Subspecies E. m. paulus is found from Colombia's Magdalena River valley north and east across northern Venezuela to Sucre state and south to northeastern Bolívar state. The species inhabits a variety of dry to arid and generally open landscapes including lowland and montane scrublands, shrublands, the edges of dry forest, and fields and pastures with scattered dense bushes and thickets. In Peru it inhabits riparian thickets. In elevation it ranges between sea level and 1,000 m (3,300 ft) in Colombia and Venezuela, between sea level and 1,500 m (4,900 ft) in Brazil, and up to 1,200 m (3,900 ft) in Bolivia.

== Behavior ==
=== Movement ===
The fulvous-crowned scrub tyrant's migratory behavior has not been fully described. Subspecies E. m. paulus is a year-round resident. The nominate subspecies is partially migratory but details are lacking. It appears to move north from much of its Argentinian range after the breeding season. The sightings in Peru and most of Bolivia are all in the austral winter (mid-April to early November).

=== Feeding ===
The fulvous-crowned scrub tyrant's diet has not been detailed but is known to be mostly small arthropods and also include small fruits. It forages on and near the ground in dense vegetation, typically singly or in pairs, rarely with mixed-species feeding flocks and only in the south. It takes most food by gleaning while perched and also briefly hovers after a short upward flight to pick food from vegetation.

=== Breeding ===
The fulvous-crowned scrub tyrant's breeding season has not been fully defined. It nests between October and January in Argentina and is thought to do so during a similar period in southern Brazil. It appears to nest in October and November in Colombia and at least in November in Bolivia. Its nest is an open cup made from a variety of plant fibers, bark, lichens, and seed down. It is suspended between thin twigs in a dense shrub and typically between about 0.4 and 4 m (1 and 13 ft) above the ground. The clutch is two or three eggs that are creamy white with darker markings. The incubation period is thought to be 14 to 16 days. Both parents participate in at least some of nest-building, incubation, and provisioning but details are lacking.

=== Vocalization ===
The fulvous-crowned scrub tyrant is a "distinctively noisy species...more likely to be heard than seen". Its "advertising song" is "a dry, scratchy, unmusical, ca. 1-second, plee-plit-irick endlessly repeated, sometimes with several introductory plee or chee oo notes before the staccato portion, and the first syllable grating". It also gives "a frequently repeated, fast, and sneeze-like plee-tirik or plee-ti-re-tik". The species vocalizes from deep in cover and pairs often sing in duet.

== Status ==
The IUCN has assessed the fulvous-crowned scrub tyrant as being of Least Concern. It has a very large range; its population size is not known and is believed to be increasing. No immediate threats have been identified. It is considered common in Colombia, common but local in Venezuela, and rare in Peru. It occurs in "at least a dozen national parks and similar reserves".
