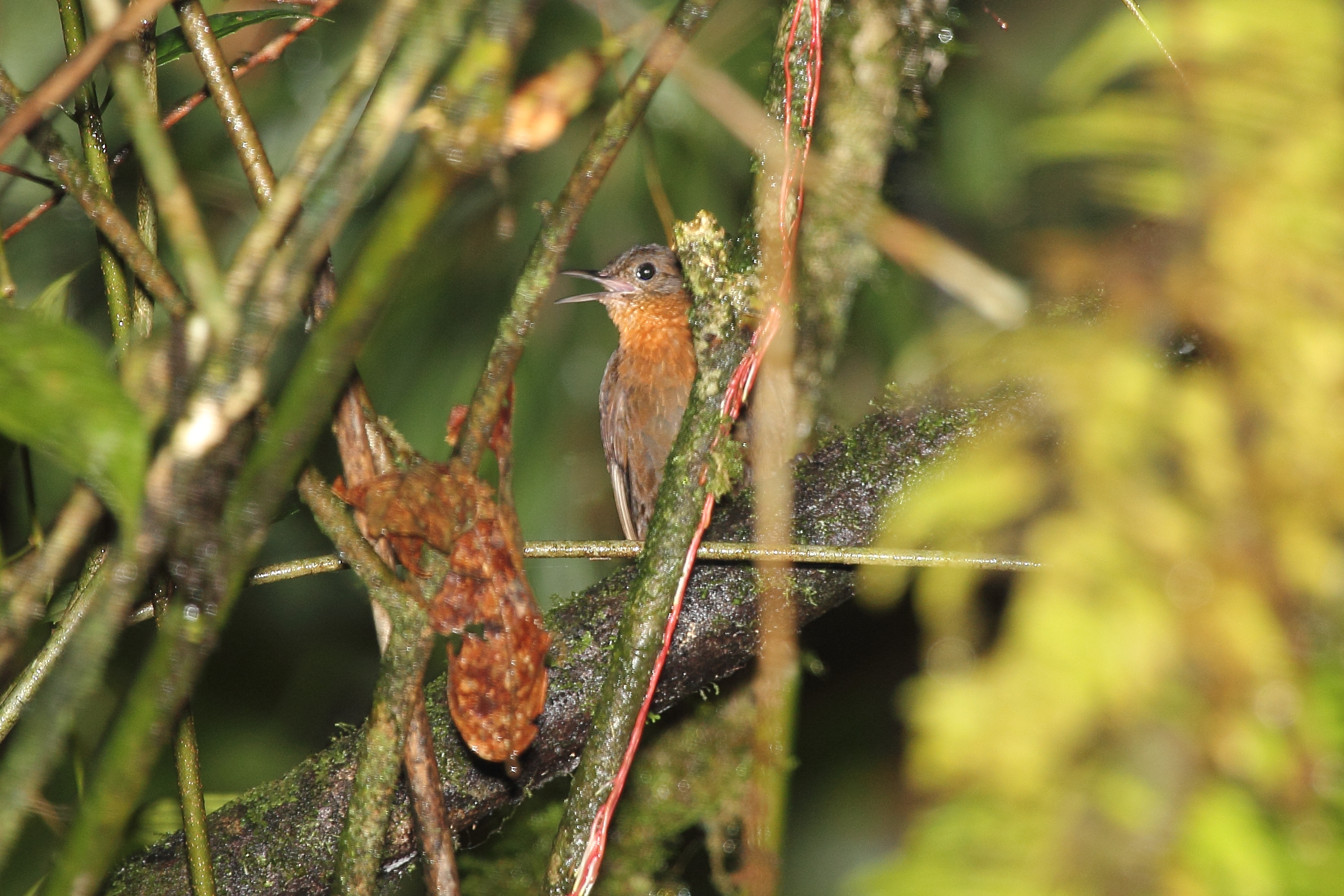

Conservation status
- Least Concern (IUCN 3.1)

Scientific classification
- Kingdom: Animalia
- Phylum: Chordata
- Class: Aves
- Order: Passeriformes
- Family: Furnariidae
- Genus: Sclerurus
- Species: S. mexicanus

Binomial name
- Sclerurus mexicanus Sclater, PL, 1857

= Tawny-throated leaftosser =

Species of bird

The tawny-throated leaftosser (Sclerurus mexicanus) is a tropical American bird species in subfamily Sclerurinae, the leaftossers and miners, of the ovenbird family Furnariidae. It is also known as the Middle American leaftosser and less frequently as tawny-throated leafscraper, Mexican leaftosser or Mexican leafscraper. It is found from Mexico to Panama.

== Taxonomy and systematics ==
The tawny-throated leaftosser's taxonomy is unsettled. The International Ornithological Committee (IOC) and the Clements taxonomy assign it two subspecies, the nominate S. m. mexicanus (Sclater, PL, 1857) and S. m. pullus (Bangs, 1902).

The North American Classification Committee of the AOS and BirdLife International's Handbook of the Birds of the World (HBW) retain an older treatment. They include these five subspecies with the other two:

- S. m. andinus Chapman, 1914
- S. m. obscurior Hartert, 1901
- S. m. peruvianus Chubb, C, 1919
- S. m. macconnelli Chubb, C, 1919
- S. m. bahiae Chubb, C, 1919

The South American Classification Committee of the American Ornithological Society (AOS), the IOC, and Clements treat these five as belonging to a separate species, Sclerurus obscurior, that they variously call the dusky leaftosser or South American leaftosser.

This article follows the two-subspecies model.

== Description ==
The tawny-throated leaftosser is 15 to 17 cm (5.9 to 6.7 in) long and weighs 24 to 30 g (0.85 to 1.1 oz). The sexes are alike. Adults of the nominate subspecies have a dark reddish to chestnut brown head, upperparts, and tail, and chestnut rump and uppertail coverts. Their wings are darker brown than their back. Their throat and chest are tawny-rufous and the rest of their underparts similar to their back. Their fairly long and slightly decurved bill has a dark maxilla and a bicolored mandible. Their iris is brown and their legs and feet are dark brownish gray. Juveniles are similar to adults but are overall duller and have light streaks on their throat and breast. Subspecies S. m. pullus is generally browner than the nominate but with a redder rump and a paler throat.

== Distribution and habitat ==
According to most sources, the nominate subspecies of the tawny-throated leaftosser is found discontinuously from Veracruz and Chiapas in southeastern Mexico through Guatemala and El Salvador into Honduras. The American Ornithological Society also places it slightly more northerly in Mexico and BirdLife International extends its range south into Nicaragua. Subspecies S. m. pullus is found from Costa Rica into western Panama, and separately on Cerro Tacarcuna in eastern Panama. The species is patchily distributed within the broadly defined areas.

The tawny-throated leaftosser generally inhabits moist subtropical and tropical lowland and submontane evergreen and semi-deciduous forest. In Guatemala and Honduras it ranges in elevation between 700 and 2,200 m (2,300 and 7,200 ft); in Panama it is found down to sea level.

== Behavior ==
=== Movement ===
The tawny-throated leaftosser is a year-round resident throughout its range.

=== Feeding ===
The tawny-throated leaftosser forages mostly on the ground, flipping aside leaves and pecking at leaf litter and rotting logs while hopping rather than walking. It typically forages alone or in pairs and does not join mixed-species foraging flocks. Its diet is mostly invertebrates; though it has not been described in detail it is known to include spiders, beetles, ants, roaches, and their larvae.

=== Breeding ===
The tawny-throated leaftosser's breeding season in Costa Rica spans from December to April; it is not well known elsewhere but in Mexico it includes April. It nests in a burrow in the ground with a loose cup of dry twigs in a chamber at its end. The clutch is two eggs.

=== Vocalization ===
The song of the tawny-throated leaftosser varies somewhat in pitch and number of notes between the subspecies, but is generally "a descending series of 3-9 fairly long high-pitched overslurred whistles Pseeer!-pseeer-pseer-pseer-pseer". It may start with "sharp spik! notes" and end with a "few stuttering short notes". Its principal call is a "short sharp explosive single note Tseek! or Skweek!". The call is typically made at irregular intervals except when exited, when it forms a long series.

== Status ==
The IUCN follows HBW taxonomy and so includes the five subspecies of dusky leaftosser in its assessment. The tawny-throated leaftosser sensu lato is assessed as being of Least Concern. Forest fragmentation and degradation have led to some local declines and extirpation.
