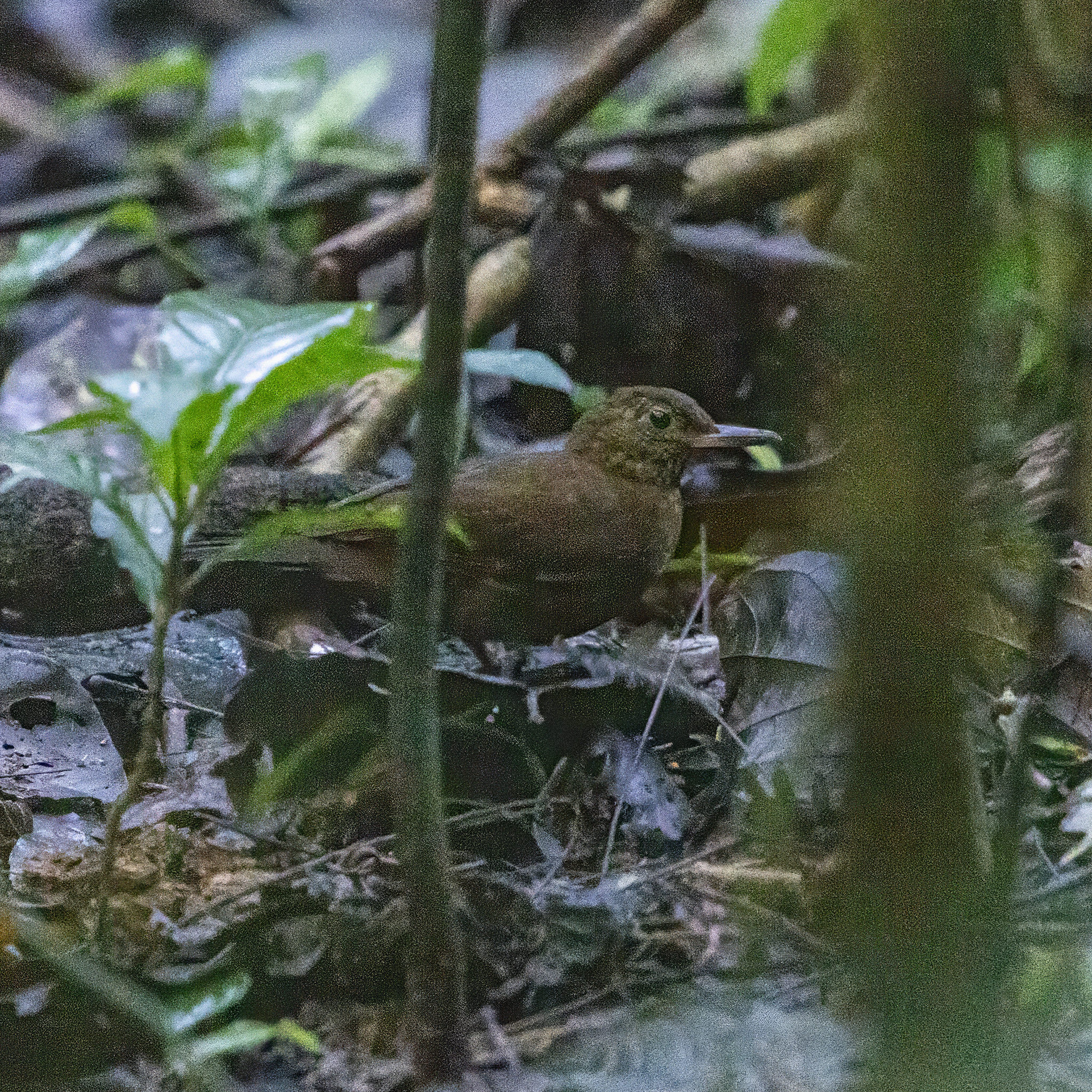

Conservation status
- Least Concern (IUCN 3.1)

Scientific classification
- Kingdom: Animalia
- Phylum: Chordata
- Class: Aves
- Order: Passeriformes
- Family: Furnariidae
- Genus: Sclerurus
- Species: S. guatemalensis

Binomial name
- Sclerurus guatemalensis (Hartlaub, 1844)

= Scaly-throated leaftosser =

Species of bird

The scaly-throated leaftosser (Sclerurus guatemalensis) is a species of bird in subfamily Sclerurinae, the leaftossers and miners, of the ovenbird family Furnariidae. It is found in Mexico, every Central American country except El Salvador, and in Colombia and Ecuador.

== Taxonomy and systematics ==
The scaly-throated leaftosser has three subspecies, the nominate S. g. guatemalensis (Hartlaub, 1844), S. g. salvini (Salvadori & Festa, 1899), and S. g. ennosiphyllus (Wetmore, 1951). The scaly throated and black-tailed leaftossers (S. caudacutus) are sister species.

== Description ==
The scaly-throated leaftosser is 16.5 to 18 cm (6.5 to 7.1 in) long and weighs about 35 g (1.2 oz). The sexes are alike. Adults of the nominate subspecies have a dark brown crown and nape with a scalloped appearance. Their back is dark brown, their rump and uppertail coverts reddish brown, and their tail is a darker brown than their back. Their flight feathers are dusky. Their face is shades of brown. Their chin and throat feathers are whitish with darker margins that give a scaly appearance. The sides of their neck and their upper breast are tawny brown and the rest of their breast is dull reddish brown with narrow rufous streaks. Their long thin bill has a dark maxilla and a bicolored mandible. Their iris is dark brown to brown and their legs and feet are blackish brown. Juveniles are similar to adults but are overall darker, and sometimes have an ochraceous tinge on their breast.

Subspecies S. g. salvini is a darker and more sooty brown and less reddish than the nominate. The streaks on its breast are narrower and less apparent than those of the nominate. S. g. ennosiphyllus is somewhat paler and grayer than the nominate and also less reddish. Its flight feathers have somewhat olive edges.

== Distribution and habitat ==
The nominate subspecies of the scaly-throated leaftosser is found from Veracruz in southern Mexico south along the Caribbean slope through Belize, Honduras, and Guatemala into Nicaragua, on the Pacific and Caribbean slopes of Costa Rica, and on the Caribbean slope of western and central Panama. Subspecies S. g. salvini is found from eastern Panama into northwestern Colombia and also in western Ecuador between the provinces of Esmeraldas and Guayas. S. g. ennosiphyllus is found in northern Colombia between Antioquia and Bolívar departments.

The scaly-throated leaftosser inhabits humid lowland evergreen forest, favoring primary forest with little undergrowth under a closed canopy. It also occurs locally in mature secondary forest and montane evergreen forest. In addition, in Ecuador it occurs in lowland cloudforest. In northern Central America it ranges up to 1,200 m (3,900 ft), in Colombia to 1,000 m (3,300 ft), and in Ecuador to 800 m (2,600 ft).

== Behavior ==
=== Movement ===
The scaly-throated leaftosser is a year-round resident throughout its range.

=== Feeding ===
The scaly-throated leaftosser forages mostly on the ground, flipping aside leaves and pecking at leaf litter and rotting logs while hopping rather than walking. It typically forages alone or in pairs but occasionally joins mixed-species foraging flocks. Though its diet has not been described in detail it is known to mostly be insects and other small invertebrates.

=== Breeding ===
The scaly-throated leaftosser nests generally between February and May in Central America but its season has not been documented elsewhere. It nests in a tunnel with an enlarged chamber at its end. Both sexes excavate the tunnel, typically in a steam bank and sometimes in the earth of a fallen tree's root ball. They make a shallow cup of plant material in the nest chamber. The clutch size is two eggs. The incubation period is at least 21 days and fledging occurs 14 to 15 days after hatch. Both parents incubate the eggs and provision the nestlings.

=== Vocalization ===
The scaly-throated leaftosser's song has been described as "a beautiful, clear trill", as "a descending series of accented whistles", and as "a slightly laughing, rippling series of 7-12 or more sharp, slightly liquid week or swee notes". Its call has been described as "a piercing wheek", "a sharp, sometimes metallic pick or zick", and "a sharp, explosive squeak! or sweeik".

== Status ==
The IUCN has assessed the scaly-throated leaftosser as being of Least Concern. It has a large range and an estimated population between 20,000 and 50,000 mature individuals that however is thought to be decreasing. No immediate threats have been identified. Mexican authorities consider it Threatened in that country. "The primary threats to this species are logging of mature forests, and habitat conversion for agriculture and livestock production."
