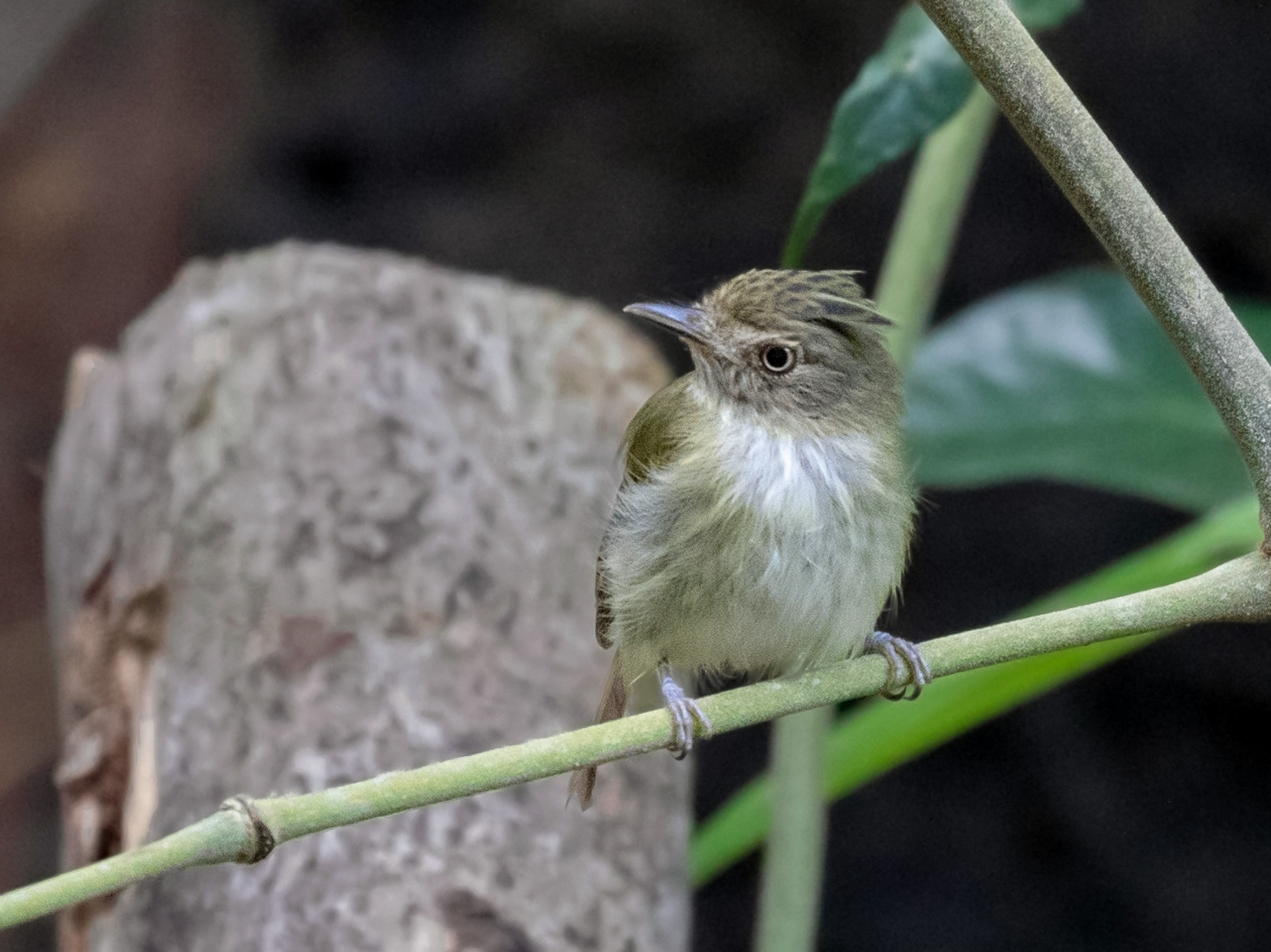

Conservation status
- Least Concern (IUCN 3.1)

Scientific classification
- Kingdom: Animalia
- Phylum: Chordata
- Class: Aves
- Order: Passeriformes
- Family: Tyrannidae
- Genus: Lophotriccus
- Species: L. galeatus

Binomial name
- Lophotriccus galeatus (Boddaert, 1783)

= Helmeted pygmy tyrant =

Species of bird

The helmeted pygmy tyrant (Lophotriccus galeatus) is a species of bird in the family Tyrannidae, the tyrant flycatchers. It is found in Brazil, Colombia, French Guiana, Guyana, Peru, Suriname, and Venezuela.

== Taxonomy and systematics ==
The helmeted pygmy tyrant was described by the French polymath Georges-Louis Leclerc, Comte de Buffon in 1780 in his Histoire Naturelle des Oiseaux from a sample collected in Cayenne, French Guiana. The bird was also illustrated in a hand-colored plate engraved by François-Nicolas Martinet in the Planches Enluminées D'Histoire Naturelle which was produced under the supervision of Edme-Louis Daubenton to accompany Buffon's text. Neither the plate caption nor Buffon's description included a scientific name but in 1783 the Dutch naturalist Pieter Boddaert coined the binomial name Montacilla galeata in his catalogue of the Planches Enluminées.

In the mid-twentieth century some authors placed the helmeted pygmy tyrant by itself in genus Colopteryx; that genus was soon merged into Lophotriccus. Several authors have suggested that genus Lophotriccus should be merged into genus Hemitriccus. Genus Lophotriccus had been introduced by the German ornithologist Hans von Berlepsch in 1883. The genus name combines the Ancient Greek lophos meaning "crest" with trikkos which is an unidentified small bird. In ornithology triccus is used to denote a tyrant flycatcher. The specific epithet galeatus is Latin for "helmeted".

The helmeted pygmy tyrant is monotypic.

== Description ==
The helmeted pygmy tyrant is about 10 cm (3.9 in) long and weighs 6 to 7 g (0.21 to 0.25 oz). The sexes have the same plumage. Adults have long black crown feathers with grayish olive edges. They form a crest that it sometimes erects and fans; they extend beyond the rear of the head when folded. Adults have whitish lores on an otherwise olive face. Their back, rump, and uppertail coverts are olive. Their wings are dusky with olive edges on the flight feathers and tips on the coverts; the latter show as two faint wing bars. Their tail is dusky with olive edges on the feathers. Their throat and underparts are mostly whitish with faint gray streaks. They have a yellowish to orangish white iris, a gray bill with a pink base to the mandible, and grayish pink legs and feet.

== Distribution and habitat ==
The helmeted pygmy tyrant is a bird of the northern Amazon Basin. It is found from southeastern Colombia and far northern Peru east across southern and eastern Venezuela, the Guianas, and northern Brazil to the Atlantic in Amapá . South of the Amazon River in Brazil its range extends between the Tapajós River and Maranhão. The species primarily inhabits the interior and edges of terra firme and várzea forest. It also is found in secondary forest, savanna woodlands, and especially in Peru and Venezuela, forests on white-sand soil. In elevation it reaches 300 m (1,000 ft) in Colombia and 1,100 m (3,600 ft) in Venezuela and Brazil.

== Behavior ==
=== Movement ===
The helmeted pygmy tyrant is a year-round resident.

=== Feeding ===
The helmeted pygmy tyrant feeds on insects. It mostly forages by itself in the forest's middle level, and occasionally joins mixed-species feeding flocks. It perches inconspicuously and takes prey mostly by using short upward sallies from the perch to grab it from leaves.

=== Breeding ===
The helmeted pygmy tyrant's breeding season has not been defined but includes March in Suriname and spans at least February to April in Venezuela. Its nest is a domed bag with an entrance near the bottom under a small "awning". It is typically hung from a tree branch about 2 to 10 m (5 to 35 ft) above the ground. The clutch is two or three eggs. Both parents provision nestlings. The incubation period, time to fledging, and other details of parental care are not known.

=== Vocalization ===
The helmeted pygmy tyrant's song is a "[s]eries of 4–10 dry staccato 'pik' or 'trik' notes, sometimes ending in warbled or trilled phrase".

== Status ==
The IUCN has assessed the helmeted pygmy tyrant as being of Least Concern. It has a large range; its population size is not known and is believed to be decreasing. No immediate threats have been identified. It is considered very common in Colombia, local in Peru, and common in Venezuela. It occurs in several protected areas. "Given that much of this species' habitat remains in relatively pristine condition within its range, it is not believed to be at any immediate risk."
