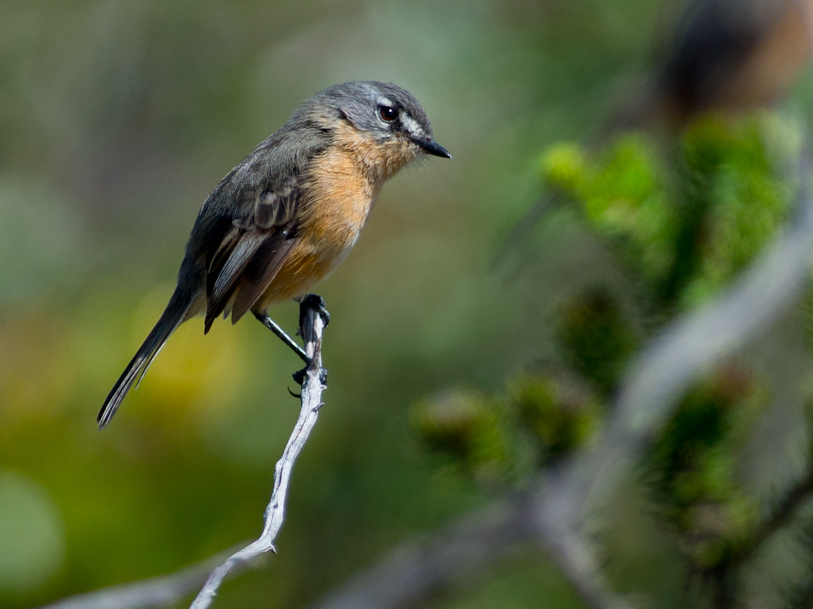

Conservation status
- Least Concern (IUCN 3.1)

Scientific classification
- Kingdom: Animalia
- Phylum: Chordata
- Class: Aves
- Order: Passeriformes
- Family: Tyrannidae
- Genus: Euscarthmus
- Species: E. rufomarginatus

Binomial name
- Euscarthmus rufomarginatus (Pelzeln, 1868)

= Rufous-sided scrub tyrant =

Species of bird

The rufous-sided scrub tyrant, or rufous-sided pygmy-tyrant, (Euscarthmus rufomarginatus) is a species of bird in the family Tyrannidae. It is found in Bolivia, Brazil, Paraguay, and Suriname.

== Taxonomy and systematics ==
Taxonomists previously called the rufous-sided scrub tyrant the "rufous-sided pygmy tyrant or pygmy-tyrant". Beginning in 2021 most systems changed the common names of all three Euscarthmus species to scrub tyrant (or scrub-tyrant) to avoid confusion with other, unrelated, species called "pygmy tyrants". However, as of late 2024 BirdLife International's Handbook of the Birds of the World retains the "pygmy-tyrant" common name for it.

The rufous-sided scrub tyrant is monotypic.

== Description ==
The rufous-sided scrub tyrant is 9.0 to 11.5 cm (3.5 to 4.5 in) long and weighs about 6 g (0.21 oz). The sexes have the same plumage. Adults have a brown crown with a small cinnamon-rufous central patch that is somewhat hidden. They have a whitish supercilium and eye-ring on an otherwise light brown face. Their upperparts are brown. Their wings are a darker brown than the upperparts with ocraceous tips on the coverts that show as two wing bars; the inner flight feathers have thin ochraceous edges. Their tail is dusky with ochraceous edges on the feathers. Their throat is white and the rest of their underparts mostly pale yellow; the sides of their breast, flanks, and undertail coverts are deep warm ochraceous buff. Both sexes have a chestnut-brown iris, a brownish black maxilla, a pinkish mandible, pinkish gray legs, and gray feet.

== Distribution and habitat ==
The rufous-sided scrub tyrant has one main range and is also known from several smaller separate locations. Its main range is in Brazil in an area roughly bounded by Amapá, central Bahia, northern São Paulo, and Mato Grosso do Sul and extending into extreme northeastern Paraguay and northern and eastern Bolivia. It also occurs locally in a few areas in the Amazon Basin of Brazil and one in southern Suriname. It inhabits unaltered campos rupestres, cerrado, and savanna with shrubs and bushes. In elevation it ranges from near sea level to 1,000 m (3,300 ft) in Brazil; in Bolivia it has been recorded between 150 and 750 m (500 and 2,500 ft).

== Behavior ==
=== Movement ===
The rufous-sided scrub tyrant is a year-round resident.

=== Feeding ===
The rufous-sided scrub tyrant's diet has not been detailed but is known to be mostly arthropods and also includes significant amounts of small fruits. It forages very low to the ground in grass and low shrubs and also occasionally on the ground.

=== Breeding ===
The rufous-sided scrub tyrant's breeding season appears to conclude in January but nothing else is known about the species' breeding biology.

=== Vocalization ===
The rufous-sided scrub tyrant's principle vocalization is a "sustained, toneless, fast, dry rattling 'pe-tit-rrut- -' or 'tit-tit-=tit-rrrut' ('tit-tit' staccato)". It also makes buzzy trilled alarm calls and a "higher, more squeaky rattling chatter; or a screeching, strained clee-clee, also in [a] longer series".

== Status ==
The IUCN originally in 1994 assessed the rufous-sided scrub tyrant as Vulnerable, then in 2004 as Near Threatened, and since July 2024 as being of Least Concern. It has a large range; its population size is not known and is believed to be decreasing. "The species likely used to be more widespread, but is restricted to specific habitat within the Cerrado biome, open humid grassy habitats, which are easily converted to agriculture. It is thought to be undergoing slow declines as a consequence of the ongoing conversion and degradation of its grassland habitat...Habitat loss in the cerrado is probably the major factor explaining its current rarity." It is considered rare and local overall but is more common in a few locations in southern Suriname and northern Bolivia.
