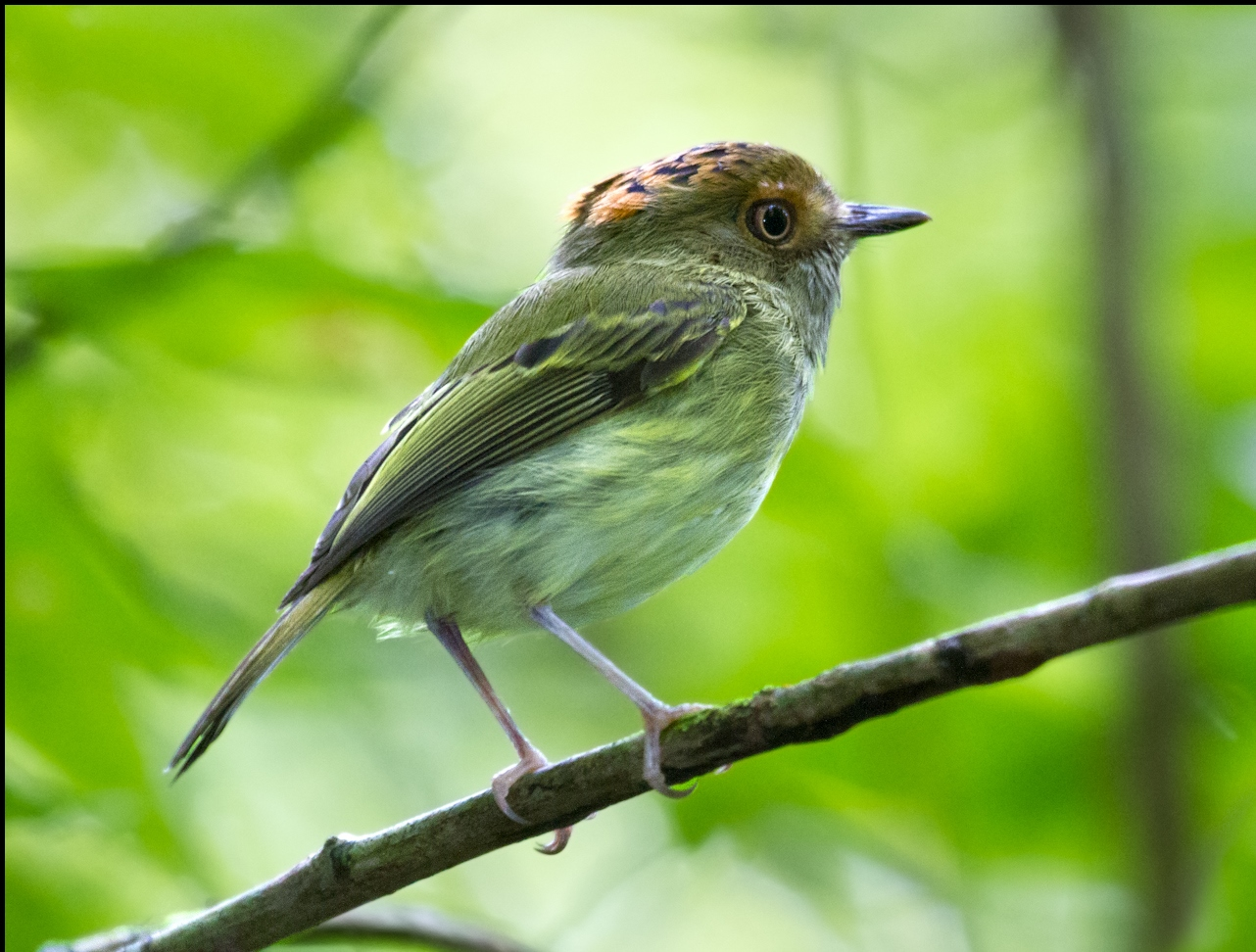

Conservation status
- Least Concern (IUCN 3.1)

Scientific classification
- Kingdom: Animalia
- Phylum: Chordata
- Class: Aves
- Order: Passeriformes
- Family: Tyrannidae
- Genus: Lophotriccus
- Species: L. pileatus

Binomial name
- Lophotriccus pileatus (Tschudi, 1844)

= Scale-crested pygmy tyrant =

Species of bird

The scale-crested pygmy tyrant (Lophotriccus pileatus) is a species of bird in the family Tyrannidae, native to the American Cordillera.

== Taxonomy and systematics ==
The scale-crested pygmy tyrant was originally described in 1844 as Euscarthmus pileatus. It was later moved into Lophotriccus. Several authors have suggested that genus Lophotriccus should be merged into genus Hemitriccus.

The scale-crested pygmy tyrant has these five subspecies:

- L. p. luteiventris Taczanowski, 1884
- L. p. santaeluciae Todd, 1952
- L. p. squamaecrista (Lafresnaye, 1846)
- L. p. pileatus (Tschudi, 1844)
- L. p. hypochlorus Berlepsch & Stolzmann, 1906

== Description ==
The scale-crested pygmy tyrant is 8 to 10 cm (3.1 to 3.9 in) long and weighs about 7 to 8 g (0.25 to 0.28 oz). It has long crown feathers that form the eponymous crest and that it sometimes erects and fans. Females have a smaller crest than males but the sexes otherwise have the same plumage. Adults of the nominate subspecies L. p. pileatus have a black crest with rufous edges on the feathers. They have whitish lores on an otherwise brownish face. Their back, rump, and uppertail coverts are olive. Their wings are dusky with yellow edges on the flight feathers and buffy tips on the coverts; the latter show as two wing bars. Their tail is dusky. Their throat and upper breast are white with blurry dusky to olive streaks. The rest of their underparts have a light yellow wash with a pale olive wash on the flanks. They have a yellow iris, a gray bill, and pinkish legs and feet.

The other subspecies of the scale-crested pygmy tyrant differ from the nominate and each other thus:

- L. p. luteiventris: brown crown with rufous edges, olive-green edges on primaries, yellowish white edges on secondaries and tertials, grayish white to olive green tips on wing coverts; orange-yellow to yellow iris with reddish rim
- L. p. santaeluciae: olive edges on flight and tail feathers, yellowish tips on wing coverts, yellowish white to pale yellow breast and throat with blurry olive gray streaks
- L. p. squamaecrista: greenish edges on wing coverts forming faint wing bars, wider and darker streaks on throat and breast and paler yellowish flanks than nominate
- L. p. hypochlorus: deeper yellow underparts than nominate with greenish tinge on breast and flanks and bright yellow belly

== Distribution and habitat ==
The scale-crested pygmy tyrant has a disjunct distribution. The subspecies are found thus:

- L. p. luteiventris: from Costa Rica on the Caribbean slope the length of the country and on the Pacific slope from San José Province south through Panama to eastern Darién Province; (also a few records in northern Nicaragua and sight records in eastern Honduras)
- L. p. santaeluciae Serranía del Perijá straddling the Colombia/Venezuela border; northwestern and northern Venezuela from Táchira to Anzoátegui
- L. p. squamaecrista: Andes of Colombia continuing south on western slope through Ecuador
- L. p. pileatus eastern slope of the Andes through Ecuador into Peru as far as Junín Department
- L. p. hypochlorus: Peru from Cuzco Department south to Puno Department; (also Bolivia)

The scale-crested pygmy tyrant inhabits humid to wet forest and mature secondary forest; it also occurs at the forest edges and in gaps such as those caused by fallen trees. In elevation it ranges in Costa Rica between 300 and 1,700 m (1,000 and 5,600 ft) on the Caribbean slope and 750 and 1,700 m (2,500 and 5,600 ft) on the Pacific slope, from near sea level to 2,900 m (9,500 ft) in Colombia, from sea level to 1,700 m (5,600 ft) in western Ecuador, between 700 and 1,700 m (2,300 and 5,600 ft) in Eastern Ecuador, mostly between 700 and 2,100 m (2,300 and 6,900 ft) in Peru but down to 400 m (1,300 ft) in the northwest, and mostly between 450 and 2,000 m (1,500 and 6,600 ft) and rarely to near sea level in Venezuela.

== Behavior ==
=== Movement ===
The scale-crested pygmy tyrant is a year-round resident.

=== Feeding ===
The scale-crested pygmy tyrant feeds on arthropods. It typically forages singly and sometimes in pairs, and very rarely joins mixed-species feeding flocks. It mostly forages from the forest's mid-level to its subcanopy. It takes prey mostly by using short upward sallies from a perch to grab it from leaves and occasionally gleans while briefly hovering.

=== Breeding ===
The scale-crested pygmy tyrant's breeding season has not been defined but includes March to June in Colombia. Its nest is a domed bag with a side entrance under an "awning". It is made from plant fibers, some of which often dangle from the bottom, and it typically suspended from a twig between about 3 and 5 m (10 and 15 ft) above the ground. The clutch is two eggs and the female alone is thought to incubate. The incubation period, time to fledging, and other details of parental care are not known.

=== Vocalization ===
The scale-crested pygmy tyrant's main vocalization is a very loud trill that differs somewhat geographically. It has been written as "tr-tr-tr-tr-tr-tr-tr-tr" and "trrrrrreét", "dzzeeer-dzeer-dzeer", and "cre'e'e'e'e, k'e'e'e'e". It also makes "a series of sharp "preek" notes, sometimes widely spaced".

== Status ==
The IUCN has assessed the scale-crested pygmy tyrant as being of Least Concern. It has a very large range; its estimated population of at least 500,000 mature individuals is believed to be decreasing. No immediate threats have been identified. It is considered common in Costa Rica and Ecuador, very common in Colombia, and fairly common in Peru and Venezuela. It occurs in many protected areas both public and private. "Given its tolerance of degraded and isolated habitats and its relatively large range, it is thought not likely to become threatened."

== Gallery ==
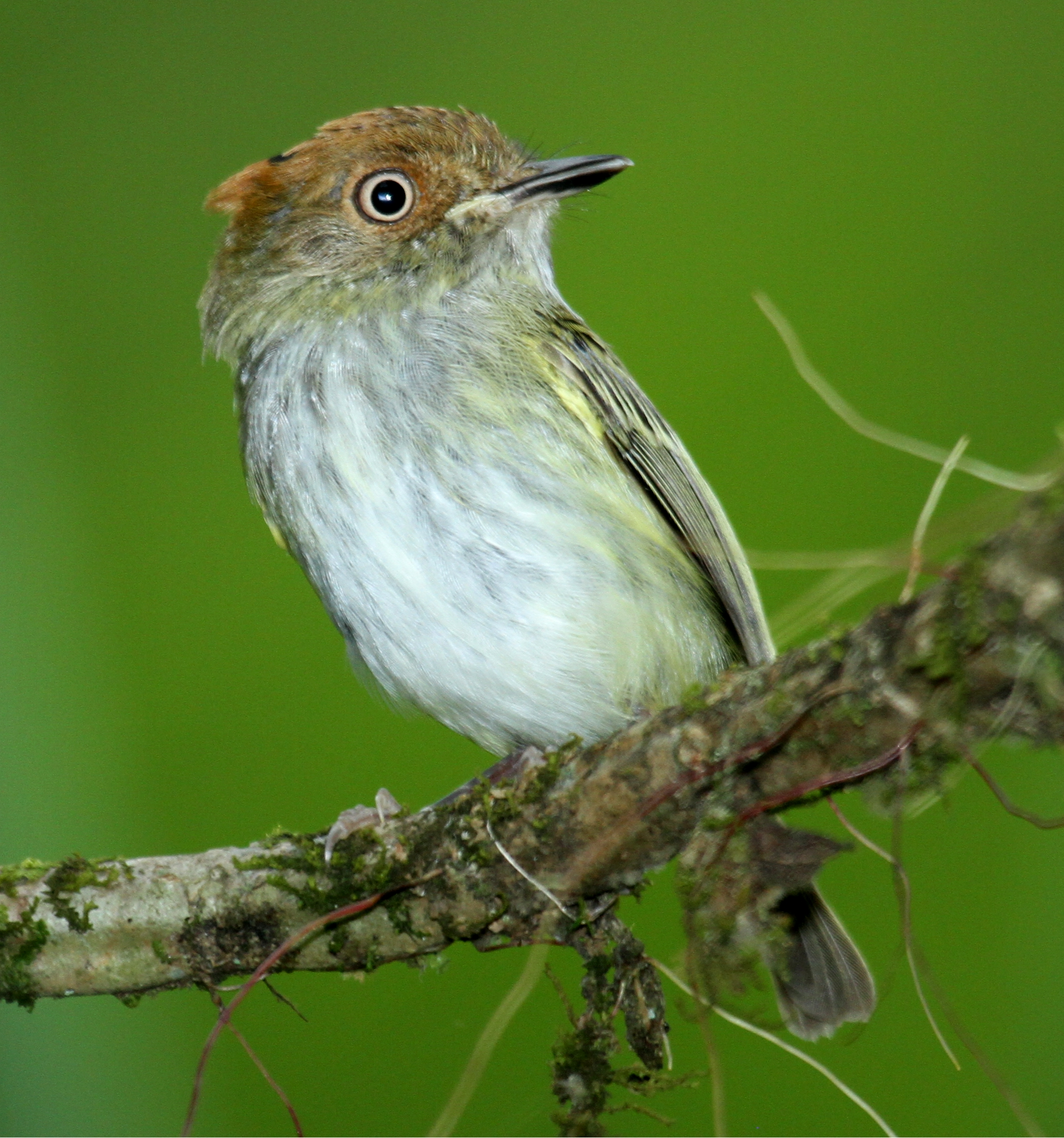
Buonaventura Reserve, Umbrella Bird Lodge - Ecuador

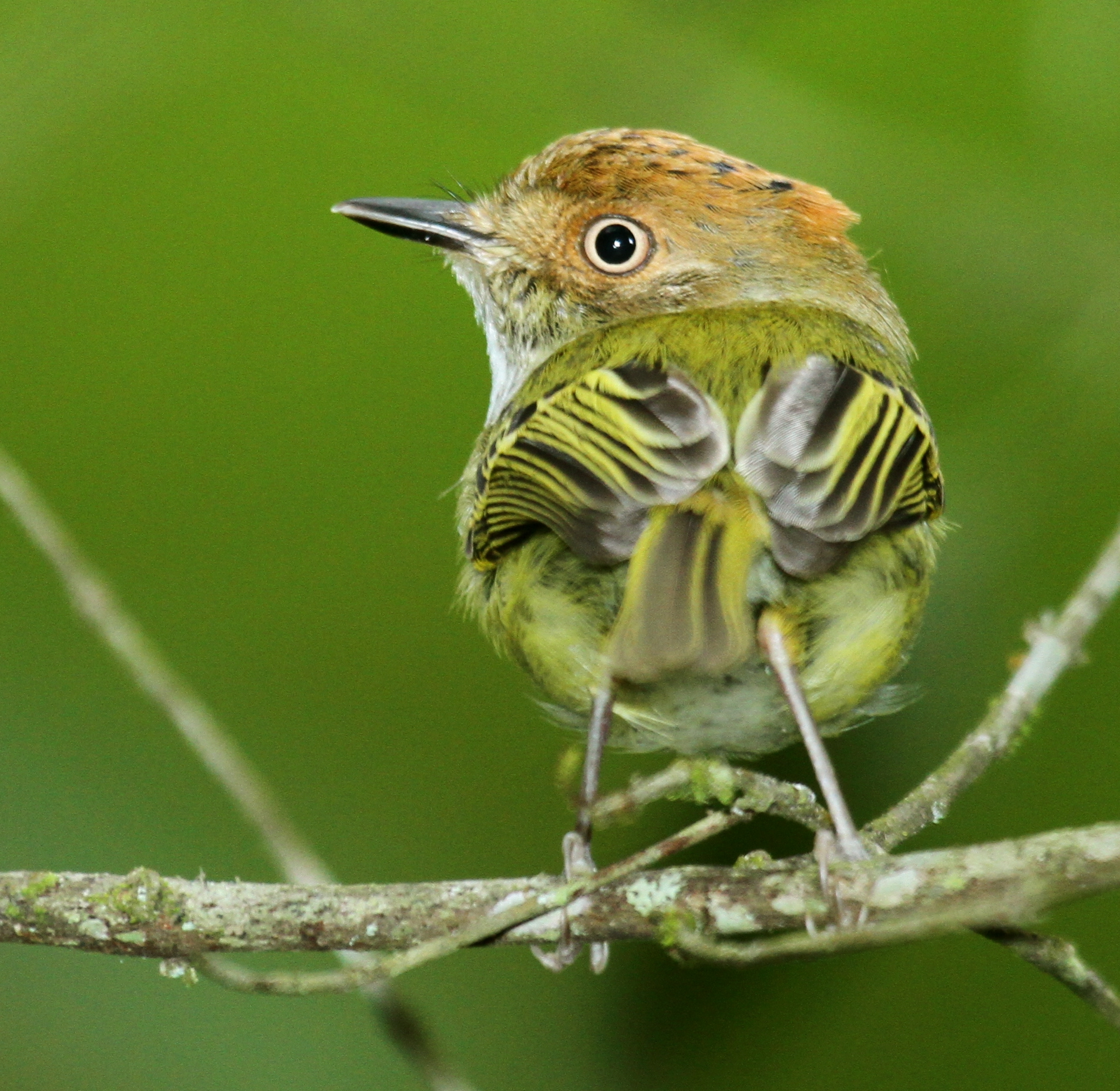
Buonaventura Reserve, Umbrella Bird Lodge - Ecuador
