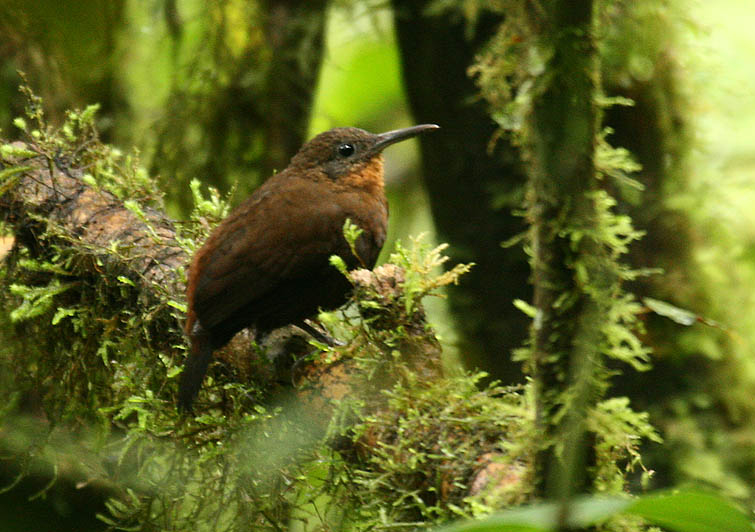

Scientific classification
- Kingdom: Animalia
- Phylum: Chordata
- Class: Aves
- Order: Passeriformes
- Family: Furnariidae
- Genus: Sclerurus
- Species: S. obscurior

Binomial name
- Sclerurus obscurior Hartert, 1901

= Dusky leaftosser =

Species of bird

The dusky leaftosser or South American leaftosser (Sclerurus obscurior) is a bird in subfamily Sclerurinae, the leaftossers and miners, of the ovenbird family Furnariidae. It is found in Bolivia, Brazil, Colombia, Ecuador, French Giana, Guyana, Panama, Peru, Suriname, and Venezuela.

== Taxonomy and systematics ==
The dusky leaftosser's taxonomy is unsettled. The South American Classification Committee of the American Ornithological Society (AOS), the International Ornithological Committee (IOC), and the Clements taxonomy assign it these five subspecies:

- S. o. andinus Chapman, 1914
- S. o. obscurior Hartert, 1901
- S. o. peruvianus Chubb, C, 1919
- S. o. macconnelli Chubb, C, 1919
- S. o. bahiae Chubb, C, 1919

The North American Classification Committee of the AOS and BirdLife International's Handbook of the Birds of the World (HBW) retain an older treatment. They place these subspecies within S. mexicanus, which they respectively call the Middle American leaftosser and the tawny-throated leaftosser.

This article treats the dusky leaftosser as a species with five subspecies.

== Description ==
The dusky leaftosser is 15 to 17 cm (5.9 to 6.7 in) long and weighs 20 to 30 g (0.71 to 1.1 oz). The sexes are alike. Adults of the nominate subspecies S. o. obscurior have dark reddish to chestnut brown upperparts, with their rump and uppertail coverts being more chestnut than the reddish back. Their wings are darker brown than their back and their tail is dark brown to black brown. Their face is brownish, their throat is tawny chestnut, and their chest and breast are a darker chestnut. Their bill is fairly long and straight with a dark maxilla and a bicolored mandible. Their iris is brown and their legs and feet are dusky to black. Juveniles are similar to adults but are overall duller and have light streaks on their breast and a light scaly appearance on their throat and chest.

Subspecies S. o. andinus is generally paler than the nominate but has a brighter rufous cast to its rump. S. o. peruvianus has entirely dark reddish brown upperparts without the chestnut rump of the nominate and andinus. S. o. macconnelli is similar to peruvianus but is somewhat olivaceous overall with a more tawny throat. S. o. bahiae has a browner back, a much brighter chestnut rump, and a darker throat than the other subspecies.

== Distribution and habitat ==
The distribution of the subspecies of the dusky leaftosser are in dispute. According to the IOC and Clements, they are found thus:

- S. o. andinus, from eastern Panama east through northern Colombia and Venezuela into western Guyana
- S. o. obscurior, the Andes of western Colombia and western Ecuador
- S. o. peruvianus, the western Amazon Basin
- S. o. macconnelli, the Guianas and northern Brazil
- S. o. bahiae, eastern Brazil

According to other sources detailed in Cooper et al, they are distributed thus:

- S. o. andinus, from the Serranía del Perijá of Venezuela south in the Andes through Colombia to central Ecuador
- S. o. obscurior, the Chocó lowlands of Colombia and Ecuador and possibly Panama
- S. o. peruvianus, the lower elevations from the Colombian Andes south through eastern Ecuador and northeastern Peru and east through Bolivia into Brazil north of the Amazon River and west of the Rio Negro
- S. o. macconnelli, eastern Venezuela, the Guianas, north-central Brazil, and the Madre de Dios River basin of Peru
- S. o. bahiae, eastern Brazil between Pernambuco and São Paulo states

With the exception of disjunct S. o. bahiae, the exact spatial and elevational boundaries between the subspecies are not known.

The dusky leaftosser generally inhabits moist tropical evergreen forest throughout its range, from lowland rainforest to humid sub-montane forest. In elevation the various subspecies range from near sea level to about 1,100 m (3,600 ft) in Brazil, 1,500 m (4,900 ft) in Ecuador, 2,100 m (6,900 ft) in Colombia, and 2,000 m (6,600 ft) in much the rest of the Andes.

== Behavior ==
=== Movement ===
The dusky leaftosser is a year-round resident throughout its range.

=== Feeding ===
The dusky leaftosser forages mostly on the ground, flipping aside leaves and pecking at leaf litter and rotting logs while hopping rather than walking. It typically forages alone or in pairs. Its diet is mostly invertebrates; though it has not been described in detail it is known to include spiders, beetles, ants, roaches, and their larvae.

=== Breeding ===
The dusky leaftosser is believed to be monogamous. Its breeding season has not been defined range-wide but is known to include April and May in Colombia and April in French Guiana. It nests in a burrow in the ground with a loose cup of dry twigs in a chamber at its end. The clutch is two eggs.

=== Vocalization ===
The song of the dusky leaftosser varies somewhat in pitch and number of notes among the subspecies, but is generally "a melodious descending series of 4‒15 upslurred whistles". It may start with "a sharp spik! note" and end with a "few stuttering short notes". Its principal call is a "short sharp explosive single note Tseek!". The call is typically made at irregular intervals except when exited, when it forms a long series.

== Status ==
The IUCN follows HBW taxonomy and so has not assessed the dusky leaftosser separately from the tawny-throated leaftosser sensu lato. Forest fragmentation and degradation have led to some local declines and extirpation.
