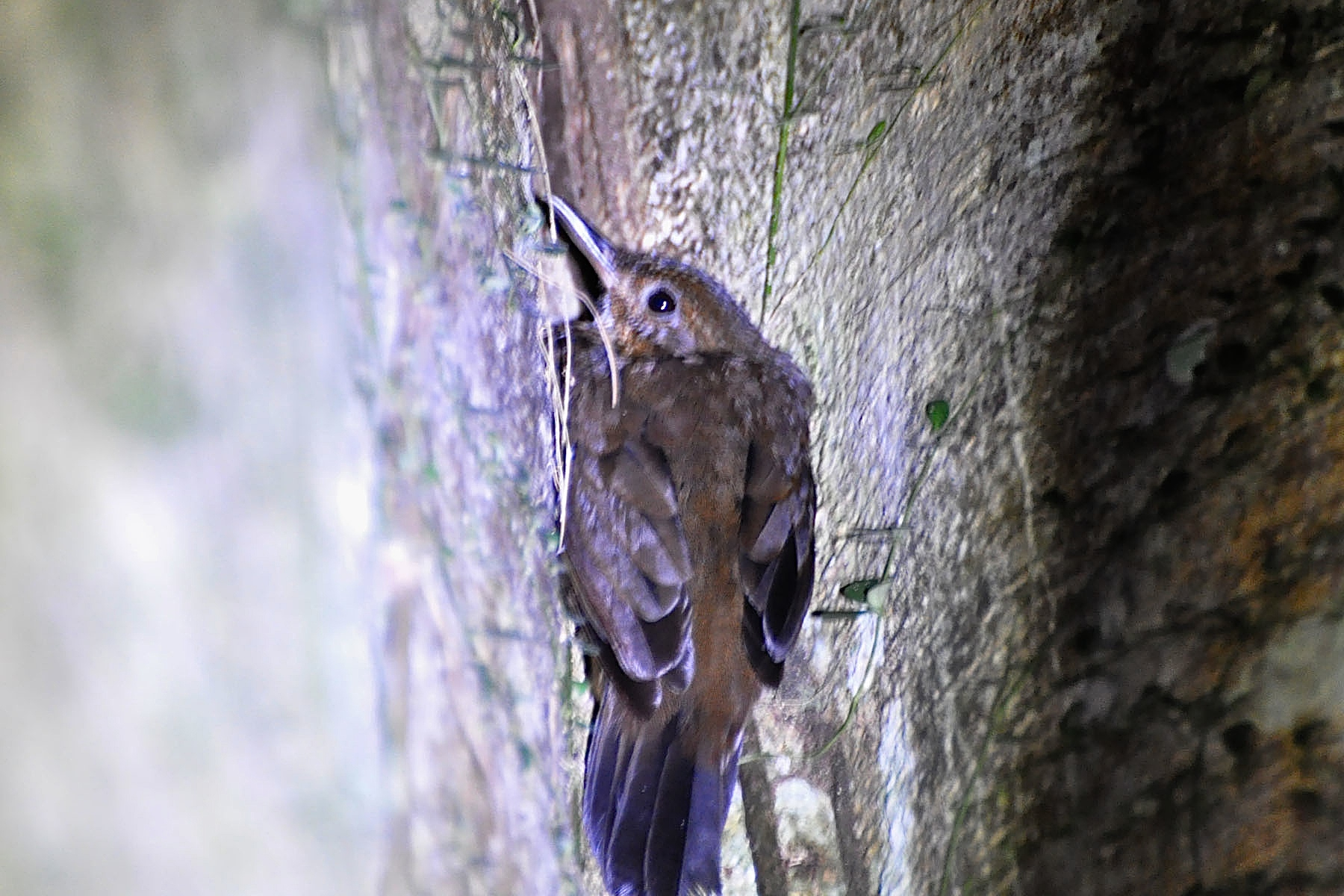

Conservation status
- Least Concern (IUCN 3.1)

Scientific classification
- Kingdom: Animalia
- Phylum: Chordata
- Class: Aves
- Order: Passeriformes
- Family: Furnariidae
- Genus: Sclerurus
- Species: S. rufigularis

Binomial name
- Sclerurus rufigularis Pelzeln, 1868

= Short-billed leaftosser =

Species of bird

The short-billed leaftosser (Sclerurus rufigularis) is a species of bird in the subfamily Sclerurinae, the leaftossers and miners, of the ovenbird family Furnariidae. It is found in Bolivia, Brazil, Colombia, Ecuador, French Guiana, Guyana, Peru, Suriname, and Venezuela.

== Taxonomy and systematics ==
The short-billed leaftosser's taxonomy is unsettled. The International Ornithological Committee (IOC) and BirdLife International's Handbook of the Birds of the World (HBW) assign it these four subspecies:

- S. r. fulvigularis Todd, 1920
- S. r. furfurosus Todd, 1948
- S. r. brunnescens Todd, 1948
- S. r. rufigularis Pelzeln, 1868

The Clements taxonomy includes S. r. furfurosus within S. r. brunnescens.

This article follows the four-subspecies model.

== Description ==
The short-billed leaftosser is a stocky bird with a short tail, and has the shortest bill of the Sclerurus leaftossers. It is 15 to 16 cm (5.9 to 6.3 in) long and weighs 19 to 25 g (0.67 to 0.88 oz). The sexes are alike. The nominate subspecies S. r. rufigularis has a dark brown face, sometimes with paler lores and supercilium. Its crown is dark brown with a reddish cast. Its back is dark reddish brown, its rump chestnut-brown, and its uppertail coverts darker chestnut-brown. Its wings are dark reddish brown and its tail is sooty blackish with some faint reddish brown. Its throat and malar are dull orange-rufous that darkens and becomes richer on its upper breast, which has narrow pale streaks. The rest of its breast is darker still and becomes less chestnut to the rich reddish brown belly and flanks. Its iris is dark gray-brown to brown, its maxilla black to gray, its mandible bicolored, and its legs and feet black, brownish, or gray. Juveniles have a duller and browner rump but are otherwise like adults.

Subspecies S. r. fulvigularis is more olive-brown than reddish brown. It has a paler throat than the nominate and a darker upper breast with wider rufous streaks. S. r. brunnescens is similar to fulvigularis but darker and even less reddish. S. r. furfurosus is overall paler than the nominate.

== Distribution and habitat ==
The subspecies of the short-billed leaftosser are found thus:

- S. r. fulvigularis, from southern Venezuela east through the Guianas into northern Brazil
- S. r. furfurosus, northern Brazil north of the Amazon River
- S. r. brunnescens, southeastern Colombia, eastern Ecuador, northeastern Peru, and northwestern Brazil all north of the Amazon
- S. r. rufigularis, northeastern Peru, eastern Bolivia, and southwestern and south-central Brazil, all south of the Amazon

The short-billed leaftosser inhabits lowland tropical terra firme evergreen forest. In elevation it ranges from near sea level up to 500 m (1,600 ft) in Brazil, is rare and local up to 300 m (1,000 ft) in Ecuador, and is found as high as 1,800 m (5,900 ft) in Colombia though usually lower.

== Behavior ==
=== Movement ===
The short-billed leaftosser is a year-round resident throughout its range.

=== Feeding ===
The short-billed leaftosser forages mostly on the ground, flipping aside leaves and gleaning from the ground and leaf litter while hopping rather than walking. Its diet of invertebrates includes spiders, insect egg cases, ants, beetle larvae, adult beetles, and winged termites.

=== Breeding ===
The short-billed leaftosser's breeding biology is almost unknown. It is assumed to nest in a burrow like others of its genus.

=== Vocalization ===
The short-billed leaftosser's song is "a high-pitched fast series of notes" that successively descend, ascend and accelerate, and become level and slower. Its call has been described as "suip" and as an extremely high "siew siew".

== Status ==
The IUCN has assessed the short-billed leaftosser as being of Least Concern. It has a very large range but its population size is not known and is believed to be decreasing. No immediate threats have been identified. It is generally locally uncommon to rare though fairly common in Venezuela, and occurs in many protected areas. It shuns fragmented and selectively logged forest.
