= Striped tit-babbler =

The striped tit-babbler has been split into 2 species:

- Pin-striped tit-babbler (Macronus gularis), also known as yellow-breasted babbler
- Bold-striped tit-babbler (Macronus bornensis)
