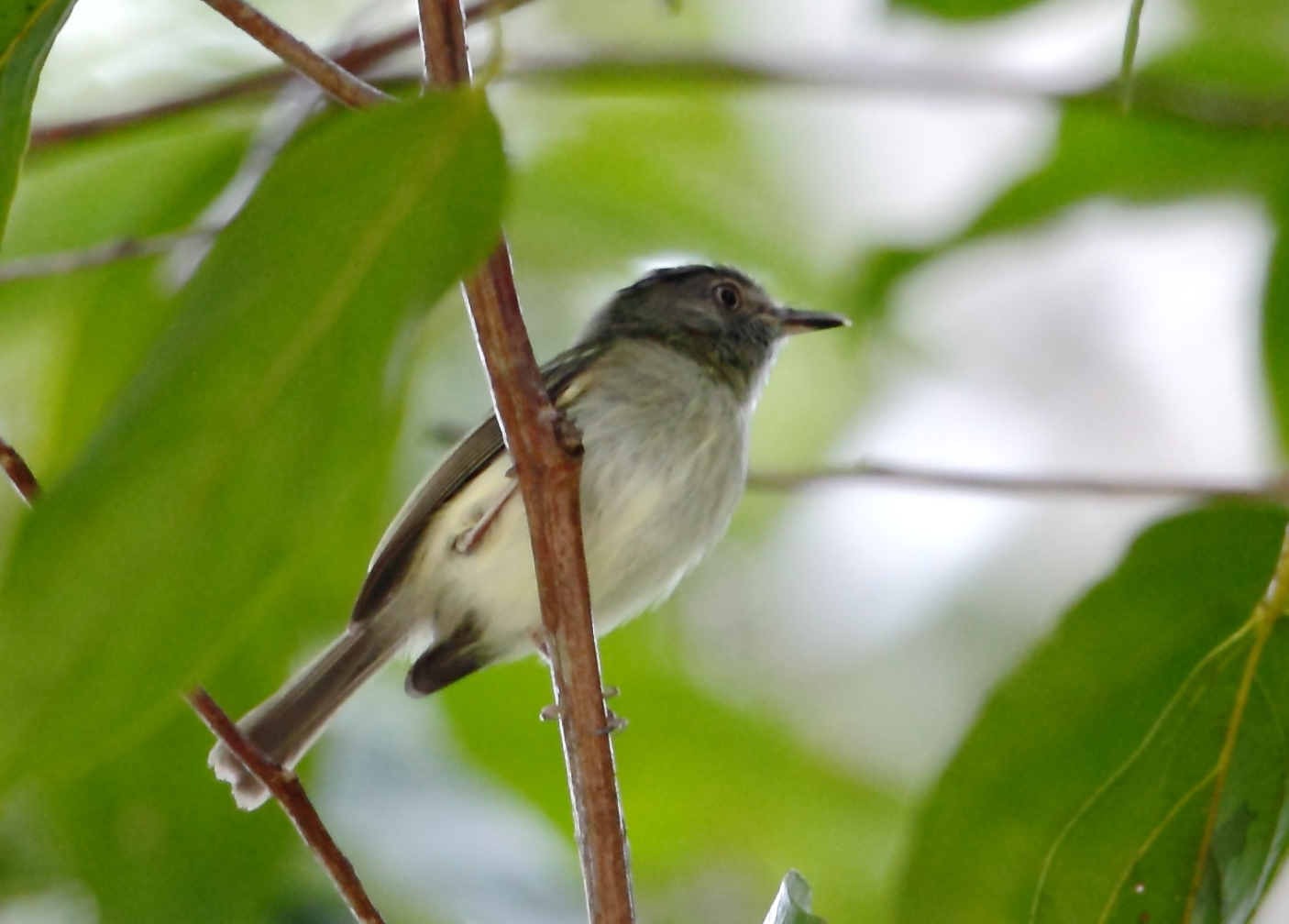
- Double-banded pygmy tyrant at Presidente Figueiredo, Amazonas state, Brazil

Conservation status
- Least Concern (IUCN 3.1)

Scientific classification
- Kingdom: Animalia
- Phylum: Chordata
- Class: Aves
- Order: Passeriformes
- Family: Tyrannidae
- Genus: Lophotriccus
- Species: L. vitiosus

Binomial name
- Lophotriccus vitiosus (Bangs & Penard, TE, 1921)

= Double-banded pygmy tyrant =

Species of bird

The double-banded pygmy tyrant (Lophotriccus vitiosus) is a species of bird in the family Tyrannidae, the tyrant flycatchers. It is found in Brazil, Colombia, Ecuador, French Guiana, Guyana, Peru, and Suriname.

== Taxonomy and systematics ==
The double-banded pygmy tyrant was originally described in 1921 as Cometornis vitiosus. The authors erected genus Cometornis for it and some other newly described species and subspecies. They soon recognized that by the principle of priority Cometornis had to be replaced by Lophotriccus.

The double-banded pygmy tyrant has these four subspecies:

- L. v. affinis Zimmer, JT, 1940
- L. v. guianensis Zimmer, JT, 1940
- L. v. vitiosus (Bangs & Penard, TE, 1921)
- L. v. congener Todd, 1925

Subspecies L. v. congener was originally described as a full species and was treated that way by some authors until the mid-twentieth century. In addition, several authors have suggested that genus Lophotriccus should be merged into genus Hemitriccus.

== Description ==
The double-banded pygmy tyrant is about 10 cm (3.9 in) long and weighs 6 to 8.5 g (0.21 to 0.30 oz). It has long crown feathers that form a crest and that it occasionally erects and fans; the feathers extend past the back of the head when folded. Females have a smaller crest than males but the sexes otherwise have the same plumage. Adults of the nominate subspecies L. v. vitiosus have a black crest with gray edges on the feathers. They have whitish lores on an otherwise olive face. Their back, rump, and uppertail coverts are olive. Their wings are dusky with greenish yellow to yellowish white edges on the flight feathers and tips on the coverts; the latter show as two wing bars. Their tail is dusky. Their throat and upper breast are white with dusky olive streaks. The rest of their underparts are mostly white with a light yellow wash on the flanks and crissum. Subspecies L. v. affinis has an olive tinge on the breast and sides and a yellower belly than the nominate. L. v. guianensis has darker gray edges on the crown feathers and stronger yellow underparts than the nominate. L. v. congener has buffy yellow edges on the crown feathers. All subspecies have a straw-yellow iris, a gray bill, and dusky pinkish legs and feet.

== Distribution and habitat ==
The double-banded pygmy tyrant has a disjunct distribution. The subspecies are found thus:

- L. v. affinis: approximately the southeastern third of Colombia, south through eastern Ecuador into northeastern Peru to the Amazon River, and east into northwestern Brazil north of the Amazon to the upper Negro River (also possibly southern Venezuela, though the South American Classification Committee of the American Ornithological Society has no records in that country.)
- L. v. guianensis: the Guianas and northeastern Brazil north of the Amazon from the lower Negro to the Atlantic in Amapá
- L. v. vitiosus: eastern Peru south of the Marañón River east to the Ucayali River and south to the Department of Huánuco
- L. v. congener: southwestern Amazonas state in Brazil and adjoining eastern Peru south of the Amazon and east of the Ucayali

The double-banded pygmy tyrant inhabits the tropical zone, primarily in humid terra firme and secondary forest and less often várzea forest. It occurs both in the forest interior and on its edges. In elevation it reaches 500 m (1,600 ft) in Colombia, 600 m (2,000 ft) in Ecuador, 750 m (2,500 ft) in Peru, and 800 m (2,600 ft) in Brazil.

== Behavior ==
=== Movement ===
The double-banded pygmy tyrant is a year-round resident.

=== Feeding ===
The double-banded pygmy tyrant's diet has not been detailed but is assumed to be mostly insects. It mostly forages singly, sometimes in pairs, from the forest's middle level to its canopy, and only rarely joins mixed-species feeding flocks. It perches inconspicuously and takes prey mostly by using short upward sallies from the perch to grab it from leaves.

=== Breeding ===
The double-banded pygmy tyrant's breeding season has not been detailed but appears to include at least August and September in western Amazonia. Its nest is a domed bag with a side entrance near its bottom under a small "awning". It is made from green moss and dried grass, some of which often dangles below the nest. It is typically hung from a tree branch about 4 m (15 ft) above the ground and sometimes over a stream. The clutch is two eggs. The incubation period, time to fledging, and details of parental care are not known.

=== Vocalization ===
The double-banded pygmy tyrant's song has some regional variation. In Ecuador it is described as "a distinctive short harsh trill that descends in pitch, 'turrrrrrew' ". In Peru, subspecies L. v. vitiosus sings a similarly described "descending, harsh, ringing djzeeer" while L. v. congener sings a "similar, but considerably lower-pitched beerrrrrrp". The species' calls include "a quiet, tinkling pik".

== Status ==
The IUCN has assessed the double-banded pygmy tyrant as being of Least Concern. It has a large range; its population size is not known and is believed to be decreasing. No immediate threats have been identified. It is considered overall uncommon to locally fairly common though poorly known.
