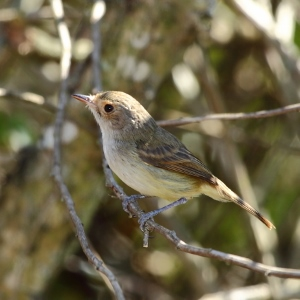
- Fulvous-crowned scrub tyrant (Euscarthmus meloryphus)

Scientific classification
- Kingdom: Animalia
- Phylum: Chordata
- Class: Aves
- Order: Passeriformes
- Family: Tyrannidae
- Genus: Euscarthmus; Wied-Neuwied, 1831

Type species
- Euscarthmus meloryphus zu Wied, 1831

= Euscarthmus =

Genus of birds

Euscarthmus is a genus of South American birds in the tyrant flycatcher family Tyrannidae.

== Species ==
The genus contains 3 species:

Image	Scientific name	Common name	Distribution
	Euscarthmus meloryphus	Fulvous-crowned scrub tyrant	Argentina, Bolivia, Brazil, Colombia, Paraguay, Peru, Uruguay, and Venezuela.
	Euscarthmus fulviceps	Fulvous-faced scrub tyrant	Ecuador and Peru.
	Euscarthmus rufomarginatus	Rufous-sided scrub tyrant	Bolivia, Brazil, Paraguay, and Suriname.
