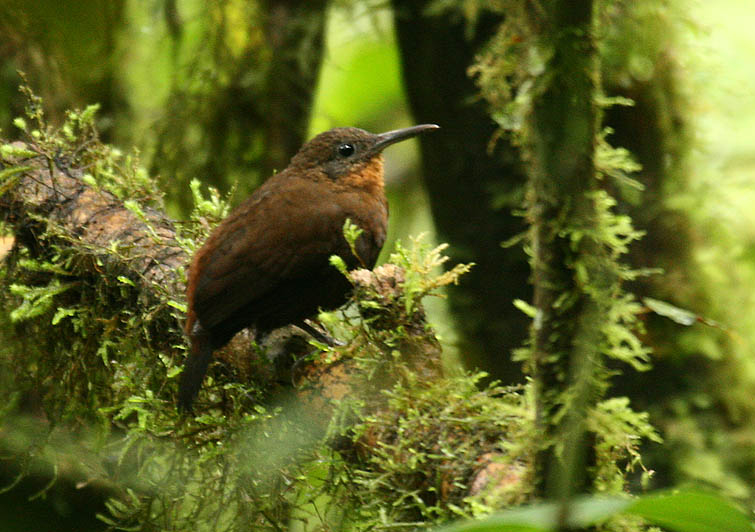
- Dusky leaftosser in Ecuador; Sclerurus obscurior

Scientific classification
- Kingdom: Animalia
- Phylum: Chordata
- Class: Aves
- Order: Passeriformes
- Family: Furnariidae
- Genus: Sclerurus; Swainson, 1827

Type species
- Thamnophilus caudacutus Vieillot, 1816

= Sclerurus =

Genus of birds

Sclerurus is a bird genus in the ovenbird family, Furnariidae. Members of this genus are commonly known as leaftossers or leafscrapers, and are found in Mexico, Central America and South America. They are close relatives of the miners (Geositta), which are essentially an open-country version of the leaftossers, being lighter in color and longer-legged. Other relatives might include the sharp-tailed streamcreeper of the monotypic genus Lochmias and some other Furnariidae of obscure relationships.

== Taxonomy ==
The genus Sclerurus was introduced in 1827 by the English zoologist William Swainson. The genus name combines the Ancient Greek σκληρος/sklēros meaning "stiff" with ουρα/oura meaning "tail". Swainson did not specify a type species but in 1855 the English zoologist George Gray designated the type as Thamnophilus caudacutus Vieillot, 1816, the black-tailed leaftosser.

== Species ==
The genus contains seven species:

Image	Scientific name	Common name	Distribution
	Sclerurus mexicanus	Tawny-throated leaftosser, also known as the Mexican or Middle American leaftosser	Southern Mexico to western Panama
	Sclerurus obscurior	Dusky leaftosser	eastern Panama to eastern Brazil
	Sclerurus rufigularis	Short-billed leaftosser	Bolivia, Brazil, Colombia, Ecuador, French Guiana, Guyana, Peru, Suriname, and Venezuela.
	Sclerurus guatemalensis	Scaly-throated leaftosser	Belize, Colombia, Costa Rica, Ecuador, Guatemala, Honduras, Mexico, Nicaragua, and Panama.
	Sclerurus caudacutus	Black-tailed leaftosser	Bolivia, Brazil, Colombia, Ecuador, French Guiana, Guyana, Peru, Suriname, and Venezuela.
	Sclerurus albigularis	Grey-throated leaftosser	Bolivia, Brazil, Colombia, Costa Rica, Ecuador, Panama, Peru, Trinidad and Tobago, and Venezuela.
	Sclerurus scansor	Rufous-breasted leaftosser	Brazil and eastern Paraguay.
