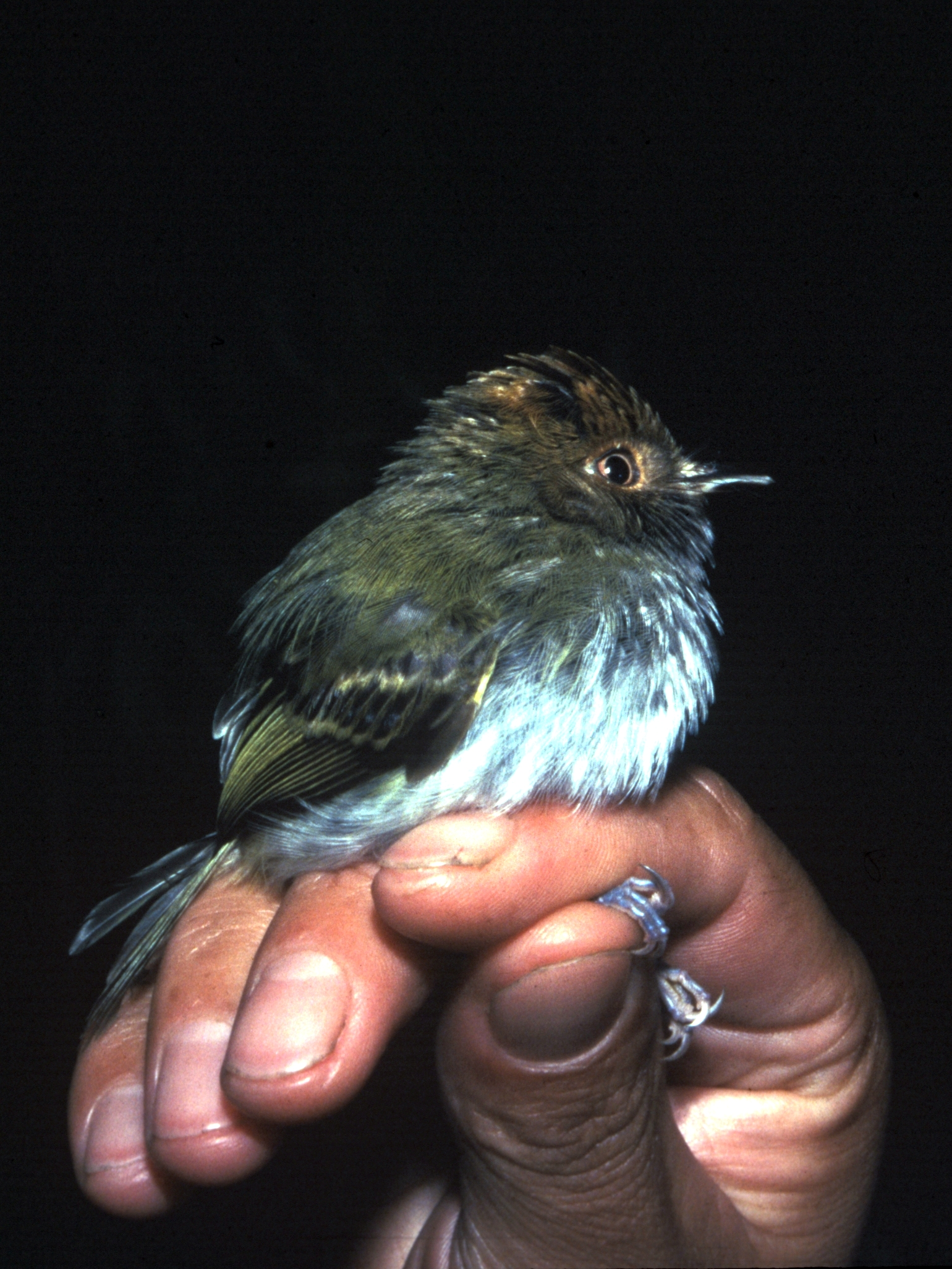
- Scale-crested pygmy tyrant (Lophotriccus pileatus)

Scientific classification
- Kingdom: Animalia
- Phylum: Chordata
- Class: Aves
- Order: Passeriformes
- Family: Tyrannidae
- Genus: Lophotriccus; Berlepsch, 1884

= Lophotriccus =

Genus of birds

Lophotriccus is a genus of South American birds in the tyrant flycatcher family Tyrannidae.

The genus was introduced by the German ornithologist Hans von Berlepsch in 1884. The type species was subsequently designated as a subspecies of the scale-crested pygmy tyrant (Lophotriccus pileatus squamaecrista) by the English zoologist Richard Bowdler Sharpe in 1884. The genus name combines the Ancient Greek lophos meaning "crest" with trikkos which is an unidentified small bird. In ornithology triccus is used to denote a tyrant flycatcher.

== Species ==
The genus contains the following four species:

Image	Common name	Scientific name	Distribution
	Scale-crested pygmy tyrant	Lophotriccus pileatus	Colombia, Costa Rica, Ecuador, Panama, Peru, Venezuela
	Double-banded pygmy tyrant	Lophotriccus vitiosus	Brazil, Colombia, Ecuador, French Guiana, Guyana, Peru, and Suriname.
	Long-crested pygmy tyrant	Lophotriccus eulophotes	western Amazon Basin of Bolivia, Brazil and Peru.
	Helmeted pygmy tyrant	Lophotriccus galeatus	Brazil, Colombia, French Guiana, Guyana, Peru, Suriname, and Venezuela.
