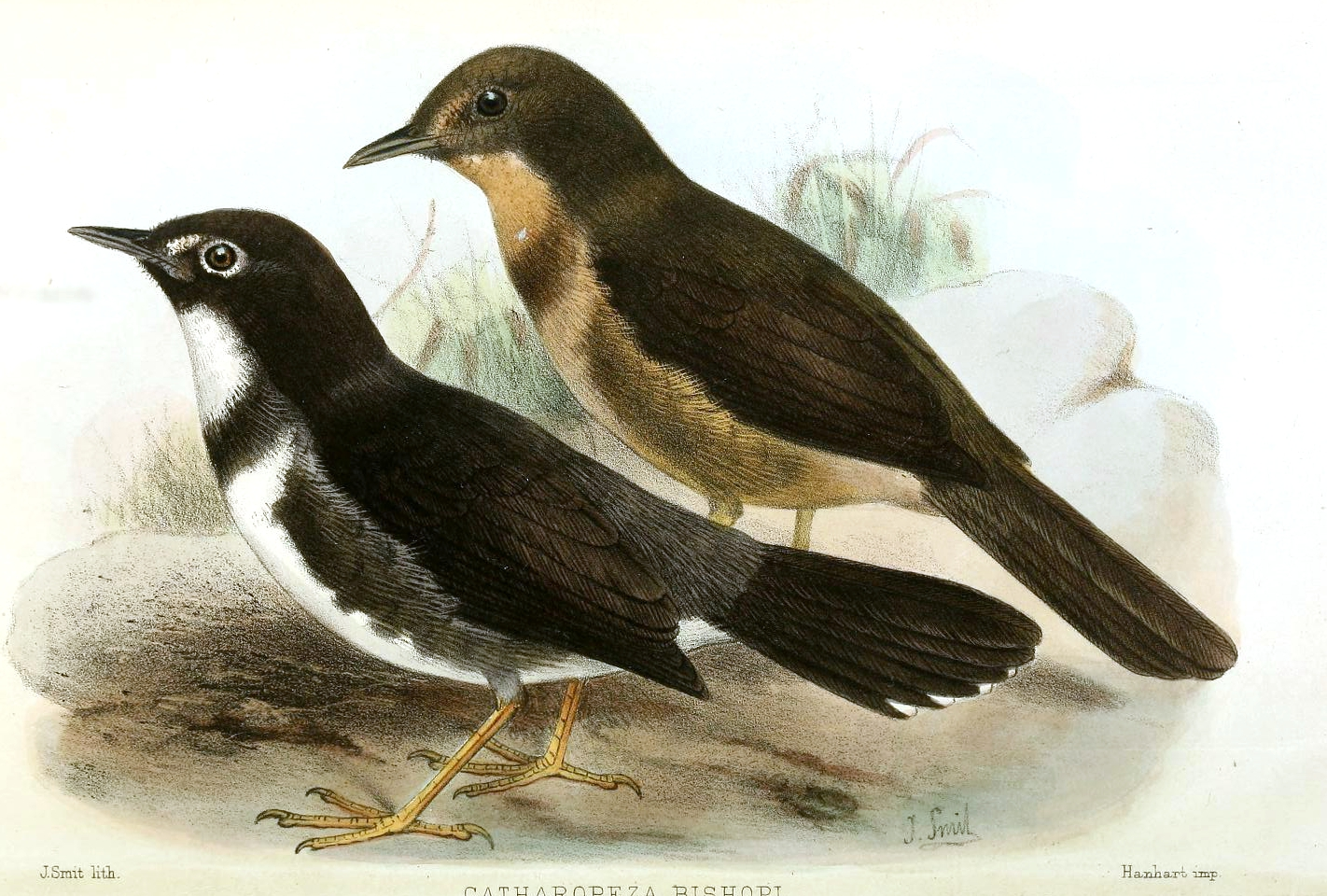

Conservation status
- Endangered (IUCN 3.1)

Scientific classification
- Kingdom: Animalia
- Phylum: Chordata
- Class: Aves
- Order: Passeriformes
- Family: Parulidae
- Genus: Catharopeza; P.L. Sclater, 1880
- Species: C. bishopi

Binomial name
- Catharopeza bishopi (Lawrence, 1878)

Synonyms
- Leucopeza bishopi Andrle and Andrle, 1976

= Whistling warbler =

Species of bird

The whistling warbler (Catharopeza bishopi) is a species of bird in the New World warbler family. It is monotypic within the genus Catharopeza. It has a dark back that fades into a lighter gradient going towards the chest. It also has a dark head, a dark strip on the breast, and a light orbital. Both male and female have the same plumage. It is endemic to the island of Saint Vincent in the Lesser Antilles. Its natural habitats are subtropical or tropical moist lowland forest and subtropical or tropical moist montane forest. It is threatened by habitat loss. This habitat loss is due to volcanic activity and deforestation. Whistling warblers have cup-shaped nests, and spotted eggs. Their diet primarily consists of insects.

== Taxonomy ==
The whistling warbler was originally given the genus, Leucopeza bishopi, but it was later changed to Catharopeza bishopi because of its stoutness in many areas of its body.

There are competing views as to whether Phaeothlypis or Dendroica is the closest relative to the whistling warbler (Catharopeza). A 1976 study argued that Phaeothlypis was Catharopeza's closest relative. Catharopeza's foraging, morphology, and song are more similar to Phaeothlypis than Dendroica. Other studies have shown Dendroica to be Catharopeza's closest relative. The closeness in relationship between Dendroica and Catharopeza has been widely recognized. When sorted taxonomically, they are often adjacent due to their similarities in morphology and song. A phylogenetic study of Dendroica and Catharopeza found that Catharopeza's closest relative in the Dendroica genus was the Dendroica plumbea species.

== Description ==
The whistling warbler is often compared to a wren in appearance. It has a dusty-black plumage, with a dark head and bill. Some interpretations of the whistling warbler have stated that they have a medium-brown plumage. A bright white ring surrounds the eye, with a hazel iris. There is also an off-white color on a minor portion of the chin and on the ends of feathers on the upper throat. The breast has a black and white striped-like pattern, with the black between two white bands. The underside of the tail goes from a blackish ash gray to an off-white. The tail's two distal feathers have a white triangle at the end of them. The tarsus and toes are a light orange color, and they also have a small manubrium-sternum bridge. Females have the same plumage.

The whistling warbler's length ranges from 5 ½ inches to 5 ¾ inches. Their wings are around 2 ¾" long, the tail is about 2 ½ in", the tarsus is ~7/8 inches, and their wingspan is approximately 8 ½ inches in length.

The immature whistling warbler has black feathers emerging on the crown and has the same appearance of the tail's feather tips as the adult, with the overall tail feather color being black. There is a dark greenish brown color on the top, and lighter color on the bottom. In place of the white marks in an adult, a light reddish-brown is present. The quills are brown.

The whistling warbler's song has a rapid rhythm, with an increasing intensity that is comparable to the Troglodytes rufescen, with less variation. The call is compared to a weaker olive-backed thrush song. In Andrle and Andrle's study in 1986, they found that the average of the most common songs were about 4 to 6 second. They also found that the Whistling Warbler's songs could be heard from morning to late afternoon, unless it was heavily raining.

== Distribution and habitat ==
Whistling warblers inhabit the hills and mountains of St. Vincent island, including Richmond Peak, and Grand Bonhomme. St. Vincent is 18 miles in length and is located 13 degrees 10' north latitude, and 60 degrees 57' west longitude. There are also active and inactive volcanoes present on the island. There is no dry season on the hilltops and they are considered rainforests due to their 3800 mm of rain annually. These rainforests range from 300 m to 500 m in elevation.

Whistling warbler distribution has changed over time. Before a volcanic eruption in 1902, whistling warblers were usually found around 300 m above sea level, but they are now found in areas 300 m to 600 m above sea level, with more of them found at lower elevations. This higher density of whistling warblers at lower altitudes is due to there being more ravines, gorges, and valleys in those areas and more wet slopes at higher altitudes.

== Behavior and ecology ==
=== Breeding ===
The whistling warbler's cup-shaped nests are found at low heights and spotted eggs have been seen in them. Nesting has been found to occur in July in one observation, and April in another. Chicks with developed wings from only a few days to a week old were seen out of the nest.

=== Diet and foraging ===
Whistling warblers forage at low heights usually from the ground to 4 m, and at most 15 m. They can be found foraging on large rocks along streams, boulders, and decayed logs. They feed on insects, herbaceous plants, and occasionally lizards. While foraging they hop from branch to branch with a "cocked tail". The whistling warbler often flicks this "cocked tail" swiftly when observed foraging.

== Status ==
The whistling warbler is listed as endangered by the IUCN Red List due to its highly restricted and decreasing habitat and its negative population trend. There are currently estimated to be 3,000–5,000 individuals in the wild. Some portions of the warblers remaining habitat are inaccessible to humans. They are vulnerable to volcanic eruptions; Mount Soufriére has erupted twice since 1900. Both volcanic activity and deforestation for sugarcane have decreased the whistling warbler's population by around 50%. They have begun to re-inhabit Le Soufriére and currently occupy an area of about 90 km^{2}.
