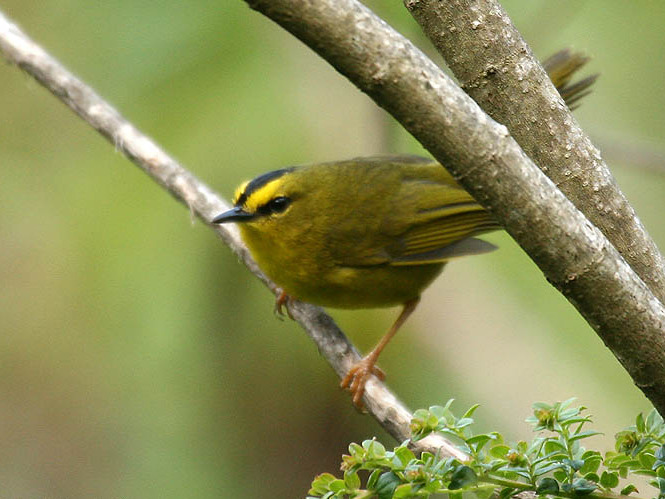

Conservation status
- Least Concern (IUCN 3.1)

Scientific classification
- Kingdom: Animalia
- Phylum: Chordata
- Class: Aves
- Order: Passeriformes
- Family: Parulidae
- Genus: Myiothlypis
- Species: M. nigrocristata

Binomial name
- Myiothlypis nigrocristata (Lafresnaye, 1840)

Synonyms
- See text

= Black-crested warbler =

Species of bird

The black-crested warbler (Myiothlypis nigrocristata) is a species of bird in the family Parulidae, the New World warblers. It is found in Colombia, Ecuador, Peru, and Venezuela.

== Taxonomy and systematics ==
The black-crested warbler was formally described in 1840 with the binomial Trichas nigro-cristatus. For a time it was placed in genus Basileuterus. By 2012 the IOC had assigned it to Myiothlypis. BirdLife International's Handbook of the Birds of the World (HBW) did so in 2016.

The black-crested warbler is monotypic. However, for a time what is now subspecies euophrys of the citrine warbler (Myiothlypis luteoviridis) was treated as a subspecies of it.

== Description ==
The black-crested warbler is about 13.5 cm (5.3 in) long and weighs about 11 to 20 g (0.39 to 0.71 oz). The sexes have the same plumage. Adults have a narrow black crown stripe, a wide yellow supercilium, a black stripe through the eye, a yellow crescent under the eye, and olive-green cheeks and ear coverts. Their nape, upperparts, wings, and tail are olive-green. Their throat and underparts are yellow. They have a dark iris, a blackish bill, and orange-yellow legs and feet. Juveniles have a dusky olive-gray head and upperparts and pale buffy-olive underparts. Their bill is paler than adults'.

== Distribution and habitat ==
The black-crested warbler has a highly disjunct distribution. It is found in the Venezuelan Coastal Range from Aragua to Miranda, in the Serranía del Perijá on the Venezuela-Colombia border, in the Venezuelan Andes from northern Trujillo and south into the northern part of Colombia's Eastern Andes, and in Colombia's Central and Western Andes south through the Andes of Ecuador into Peru. In Peru it is on the western Andean slope south to southern Cajamarca Department and on both slopes in the Marañón River valley.

The black-crested warbler inhabits the edges and clearings of montane forest, cloudforest, and mature secondary forest, all with dense understory, and shuns shuns their interiors. In some areas if favors stands of Chusquea bamboo and areas with bracken (Pteridium). In somewhat more open landscapes it frequents hedgerows. In Venezuela it ranges in elevation between 1,800 and 2,200 m (5,910 and 7,220 ft) in the Coastal Range and between 2,000 and 3,100 m (6,560 and 10,170 ft) in the Andes. It ranges between 2,300 and 3,400 m (7,550 and 11,150 ft) in Colombia, mostly between 2,000 and 3,500 m (6,560 and 11,480 ft) in Ecuador, and between 1,800 and 3,300 m (5,910 and 10,830 ft) in Peru.

== Behavior ==
=== Movement ===
The black-crested warbler is a sedentary year-round resident.

=== Feeding ===
The black-crested warbler's diet has not been studied but is assumed to be mostly or entirely invertebrates. It forages mostly in pairs, on the ground or not far above it in vegetation. It takes prey by gleaning from dense low undergrowth but will do so in the higher levels of the understory. In the non-breeding season it sometimes joins mixed-species feeding flocks.

=== Breeding ===
The black-crested warbler's breeding season has not been fully defined but includes November to December and May in Ecuador. In Colombia there is breeding evidence through much of the year. Its nest is a domed cup with a side entrance, and typically made from grasses and bamboo leaves. It is placed on level ground, a mossy hummock, or an earthen bank. The clutch is two eggs. The incubation period, time to fledging, and details of parental care are not known.

=== Vocalization ===
One description of the black-crested warbler's song is "a few sharp, sputtering notes accelerating gradually into fast, rattling [series] that rises, tsuk, . tsuk, tsweettweet-tueet-ueet'eet'et 'et'et't't't" and is sometimes repeated many times with short pauses between. Its call is "a loud chit". Another author similarly describes the song as "a loud, accelerating, falling then rising series of musical notes ending in a louder note, for example: tik tik ter ter-ter-ti-ti-ti-TEW" and the call as "a dry tik or thk".

== Status ==
The IUCN has assessed the black-crested warbler as being of Least Concern. It has a large range; its population size is not known and is believed to be decreasing. No immediate threats have been identified. It is considered "fairly common to common" in Venezuela, "common" in Colombia and Ecuador, and "fairly common" in Peru.
