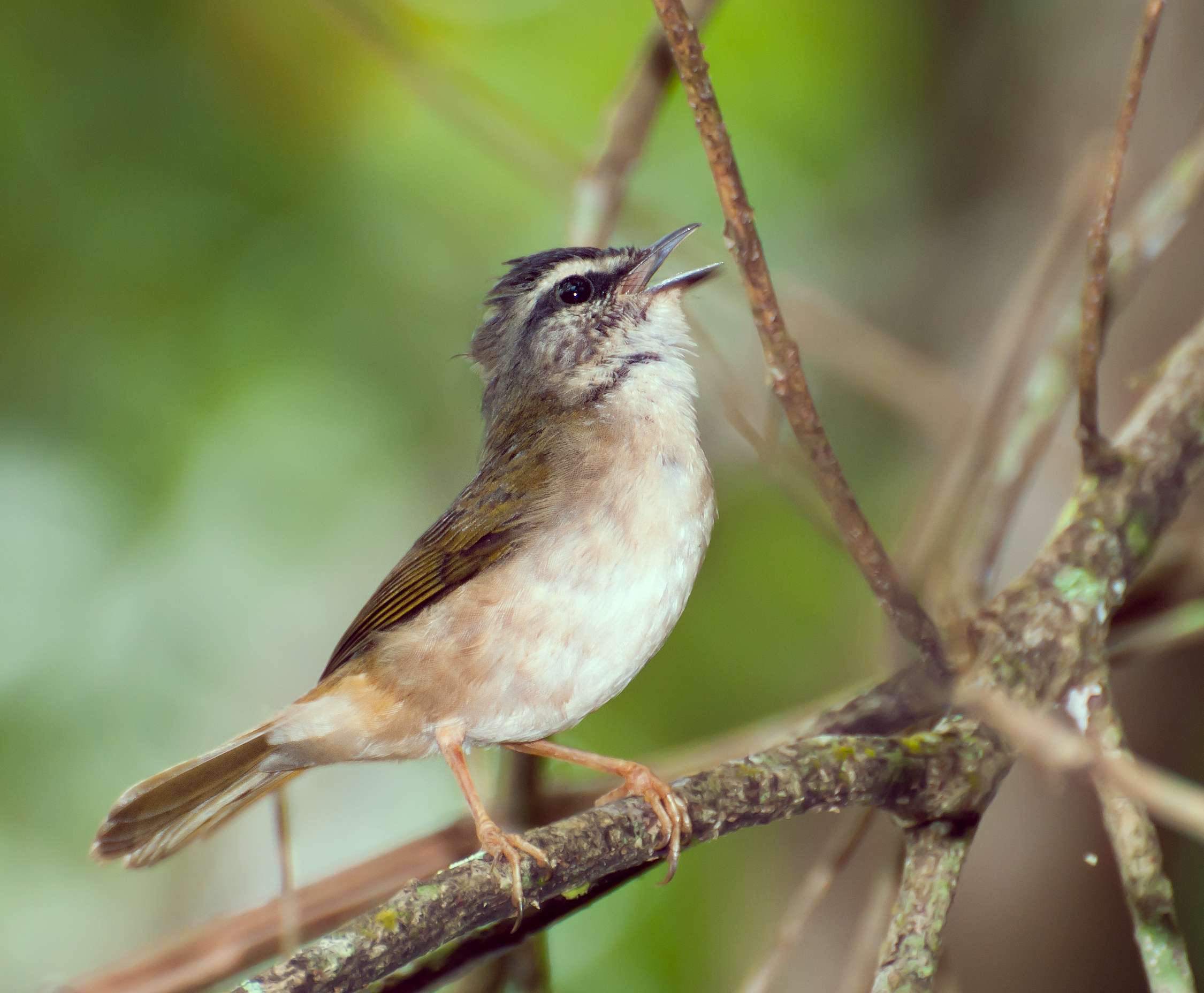
- At Vale do Ribeira, Registro, São Paulo, Brazil

Conservation status
- Least Concern (IUCN 3.1)

- Least Concern (IUCN 3.1)

Scientific classification
- Kingdom: Animalia
- Phylum: Chordata
- Class: Aves
- Order: Passeriformes
- Family: Parulidae
- Genus: Myiothlypis
- Species: M. rivularis

Binomial name
- Myiothlypis rivularis (Wied-Neuwied, M, 1821)

Synonyms
- See text

= Riverbank warbler =

Species of bird

The riverbank warbler (Myiothlypis rivularis) is a species of bird in the family Parulidae, the New World warblers. It is found in Argentina, Bolivia, Brazil, French Guiana, Guyana, Paraguay, and Uruguay.

== Taxonomy and systematics ==
The riverbank warbler was formally described in 1821 with the binomial Muscicapa rivularis.

The riverbank warbler has a complicated taxonomic history since its original description. At some time in the nineteenth century it was reassigned to genus Basileuterus that had been erected in 1848. In 1929 W. E. Clyde Todd erected a new genus, Phaeothlypis, and in 1968 other authors assigned rivularis to it. In the early twenty-first century several studies confirmed that many species in Phaeothlypis were nested within Basileuterus but that the latter was polyphyletic. By 2007 taxonomic systems had begun to resurrect genus Myiothlypis, which had been erected in 1850, for the riverbank warbler and many other species. Some late twentieth century authors treated the riverbank warbler and the buff-rumped warbler (M. fulvicauda) as conspecific, and there is some evidence that they form a superspecies.

The riverbank warbler has also borne the English names "Neotropical river warbler", "riverside warbler" or just "river warbler", with the last leading to confusion with the Old World river warbler (Locustella fluviatilis).

The riverbank warbler's taxonomy remains unresolved. The IOC, AviList, and the Clements taxonomy assign it these three subspecies:

- M. r. mesoleuca (Sclater, PL, 1865)
- M. r. rivularis (Wied-Neuwied, M, 1821)
- M. r. boliviana (Sharpe, 1885)

However, in 2016 BirdLife International's Handbook of the Birds of the World (HBW) split the species, calling rivularis the "southern riverbank warbler" and mesoleuca (with boliviana) the "northern riverbank warbler". It retains the split as of late 2025.

This article follows the majority one species, three subspecies model.

== Description ==
The riverbank warbler is 11 to 14 cm (4.3 to 5.5 in) long. The sexes have the same plumage. Adults of the nominate subspecies M. r. rivularis have a slate gray crown and a whitish supercilium with a thin black line between them, a blackish stripe through the eye, a buff crescent below the eye, and olive-brown ear coverts with buff streaks. Their nape and the sides of their neck are slate gray. Their upperparts, wings, and tail are dark olive. Their throat and underparts are mostly whitish with a buff wash on the breast, flanks, belly, and undertail coverts. Juveniles have a dark brown head, upperparts, wings, tail, and breast with olive mottling on the last. Their belly and undertail coverts are pale buff and they have a mostly pale pinkish bill. Subspecies M. r. mesoleuca has a buffish to ochre supercilium with at most a very weak dark streak between it and the crown. Their underparts have at most a pale buff wash. M. r. boliviana has a shorter and buffier supercilium than mesoleuca with no black streak. Its underparts are even whiter than mesoleuca's. Adults of all subspecies have a dark iris, a blackish bill, and pale pinkish to yellowish pink legs and feet.

== Distribution and habitat ==
The riverbank warbler has a disjunct distribution: Each subspecies' range is widely separated from the others. The subspecies are found thus:

- M. r. mesoleuca: from eastern Venezuela's Amazonas, Bolívar, and Delta Amacuro states east through the Guianas and northern Brazil; in Brazil south to a rough line from northern Amazonas and Roraima southeast to western Pará, then southwest to western Mato Grosso, and then northeast to the Atlantic in Maranhão
- M. r. rivularis: southeastern Brazil from southern Bahia south to Santa Catarina and west into eastern Paraguay and extreme northeastern Argentina's Misiones Province
- M. r. boliviana: Bolivia from La Paz Department south to Tarija Department

The riverbank warbler inhabits rainforest along large and small watercourses and in swamps. In elevation it ranges from sea level to 1,100 m (3,600 ft) in Venezuela. It reaches 800 m (2,600 ft) in Brazil and is found locally as high as 1,400 m (4,600 ft) in Bolivia.

== Behavior ==
=== Movement ===
The riverbank warbler is a sedentary year-round resident.

=== Feeding ===
The riverbank warbler feeds primarily on insects and other arthropods. Pairs hop along the forest floor and along fallen logs. The species mostly gleans its prey but takes some in mid-air with a sally from the ground. It forages along watercourses, at wet areas of forest floor, and along forest paths. It occasionally attends swarms of army ants.

=== Breeding ===
The riverbank warbler's breeding season has not been defined but includes February in Venezuela. In southeastern Brazil it apparently breeds almost year-round. Pairs are thought to maintain a territory year-round. The species' nest is a domed cup with a side entrance, made from leaves and grass. The clutch is two eggs that are white with sparse gray and chestnut markings. Nothing else is known about the species' breeding biology.

=== Vocalization ===
The riverbank warbler's song is a "starting very high and descending series of feew notes; after the 1st 5-7 notes transformed into forceful, very loud, level, rattled tjehtjeh--" with about seven tjeh notes. Its calls include tek!, trrek!, and tseeu.

== Status ==
The IUCN follows HBW taxonomy and so has separately assessed the "southern" (rivularis) and "northern" (mesoleuca + boliviana) riverbank warblers. Both are of Least Concern. Neither population's size is known and both are believed to be decreasing. No immediate threats to either have been identified. The species is considered fairly common in Venezuela, "frequent to uncommon" in northern Brazil, and "common to frequent" in southeastern Brazil. It "apparently relies largely on intact forest".
