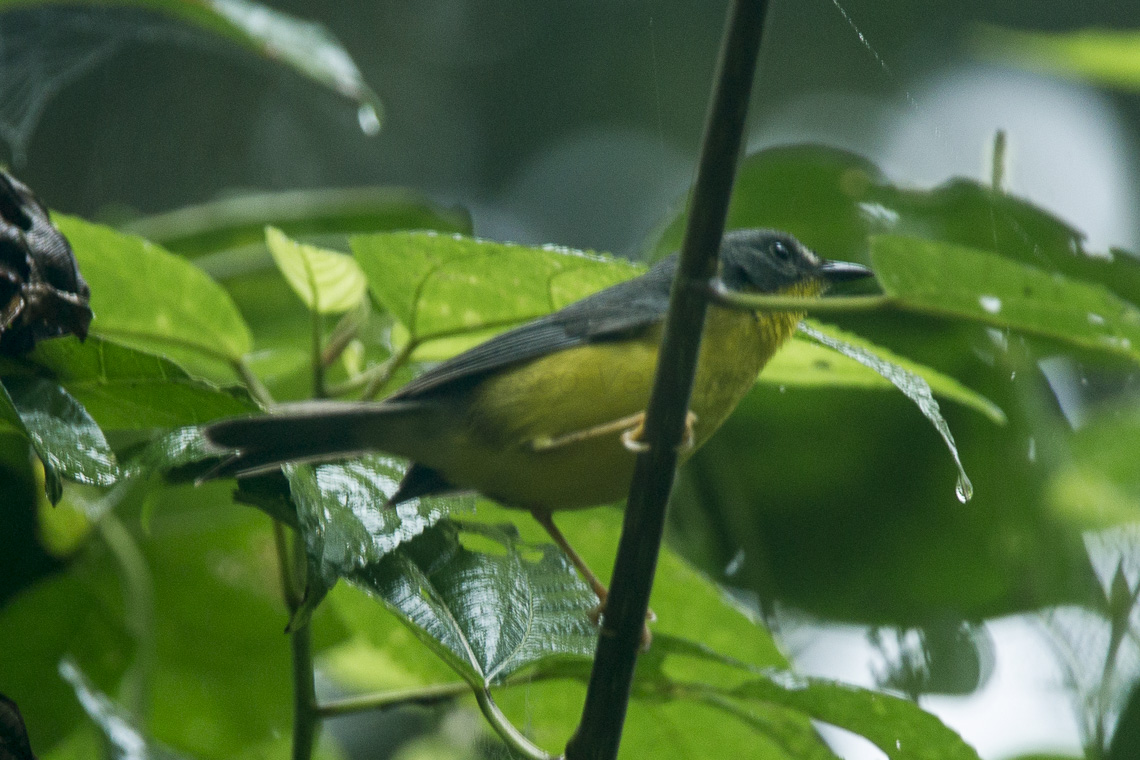

Conservation status
- Least Concern (IUCN 3.1)

Scientific classification
- Kingdom: Animalia
- Phylum: Chordata
- Class: Aves
- Order: Passeriformes
- Family: Parulidae
- Genus: Myiothlypis
- Species: M. fraseri

Binomial name
- Myiothlypis fraseri (Sclater, PL, 1884)

Synonyms
- Basileuterus fraseri

= Grey-and-gold warbler =

Species of bird

The grey-and-gold warbler (Myiothlypis fraseri) is a species of bird in the family Parulidae, the New World warblers. It is found in Ecuador and Peru.

== Taxonomy and systematics ==
The grey-and-gold warbler was formally described in 1884 with the binomial Basileuterus fraseri. The specific epithet fraseri honors Louis Fraser, who collected the first specimen. By 2007 taxonomic systems had begun to resurrect genus Myiothlypis, which had been erected in 1850, for the grey-and-gold warbler and many other species.

The grey-and-gold warbler has two subspecies, the nominate M. f. fraseri (Sclater, PL, 1884) and M. f. ochraceicrista (Chapman, 1921).

== Description ==
The grey-and-gold warbler is about 14 cm (5.5 in) long. Males weigh an average of 12 g (0.42 oz) and females average 12 g (0.42 oz). The sexes have the same plumage. Adults of the nominate subspecies have a lemon-yellow crown stripe with black borders, black lores, and a white streak above the lores on an otherwise blue-gray face. The center of their back is dull olive and the rest of their upperparts are blue-gray. Their wings and tail are blackish gray with blue-gray feather edges. Their chin is white and the rest of their underparts are yellow that is lightest on the undertail coverts. Subspecies M. f. ochraceicrista has an ochraceous-orange crown stripe and is otherwise like the nominate. Both subspecies have a brown iris, a black bill, and yellow-brown legs and feet.

== Distribution and habitat ==
Subspecies M. f. ochraceicrista of the grey-and-gold warbler is the more northerly of the two. It is found in western Ecuador from southern Esmeraldas Province south at least to southern Guayas Province and on Puna Island in the Gulf of Guayaquil. The nominate is found west of the Andes from Chimborazo Province in central Ecuador south into far northwestern Peru's Lambayeque Department. The species inhabits the understory of a variety of landscapes including drier to humid deciduous forest and scrublands. The two subspecies possibly overlap or meet in El Oro Province. In elevation in Ecuador it is mostly found below 400 m (1,300 ft) but reaches 1,700 m (5,600 ft) in the southwest. In Peru it ranges between 400 and 1,800 m (1,300 and 5,900 ft).

== Behavior ==
=== Movement ===
The grey-and-yellow warbler is a sedentary year-round resident.

=== Feeding ===
The grey-and-gold warbler's diet has not been studied though it is known to feed primarily on invertebrates. It forages mostly in the forest's understory and only occasionally joins mixed-species feeding flocks.

=== Breeding ===
Almost all knowledge of the grey-and-gold warbler's breeding biology come from observations of two nests published in 2007.

Both nests were domed cups. One author found the first nest in December 1997 in the Tumbes Reserved Zone in northwestern Peru. It held four creamy white eggs with pinkish-orange and red-brown speckles concentrated at the larger end. It was built into a steep slope in a natural depression at the base of a Chrysophyllum tree. The cup and dome were woven from twigs, herbaceous stems, several kinds of dry leaves, moss, and fungal rhizomorphs. The cup was lined with dry grass and thin rootlets. No further observations were made.

The authors found the second nest in April 2006 in the Jorupe Reserve (owned and operated by the Fundación Jocotoco) in southwestern Ecuador; it held two well-feathered nestlings when discovered. It was built into the side of a steep ravine and under a liana; the nest rim was even with the top of the bank. Both adults provisioned the nestlings and removed fecal sacs. When the young fledged they flew from the rim of the cup into surrounding vegetation. This nest's cup and dome were made from grasses, leaf skeletons, and other plant fibers; the cup was tightly woven and the dome more loosely so. It had two layers of lining. The top layer was mostly dry grass and the bottom layer was about half and half dry grass and unidentified dark flexible fibers. No further observations were made.

=== Vocalization ===
The grey-and-gold warbler's song "hesitates at first, then becomes a short rising series of musical notes, e.g. titu, titu, tituyuteeteechee?". Another description is "a melancholy series of ringing whistles...for example: tu ti tu ti tur-JAEE-JZEEOO". The species' calls include "a short tp, a more musical cheet, and a deep djrt".

== Status ==
The IUCN has assessed the grey-and-gold warbler as being of Least Concern. It has a large range; its population size is not known and is believed to be decreasing. No immediate threats have been identified. It is considered "often common" in Ecuador and common in Peru. "As is the case with all species of birds that occupy forest, Gray-and-gold Warbler is vulnerable to habitat loss or degradation; these factors are believed to be contributing to population declines in Gray-and-gold Warbler."
