= Grey-headed warbler =

Conservation status
- Near Threatened (IUCN 3.1)

Scientific classification
- Kingdom: Animalia
- Phylum: Chordata
- Class: Aves
- Order: Passeriformes
- Family: Parulidae
- Genus: Myiothlypis
- Species: M. griseiceps

Binomial name
- Myiothlypis griseiceps (Sclater, PL & Salvin, 1868)

Synonyms
- See text

Species of bird

The grey-headed warbler (Myiothlypis griseiceps or Basileuterus griseiceps) is a Near Threatened species of bird in the family Parulidae, the New World warblers. It is endemic to Venezuela.

== Taxonomy and systematics ==
The grey-headed warbler was formally described in 1868 with the binomial Basileuterus griseiceps. However, the species' taxonomy is not settled. As of late 2025 BirdLife International's Handbook of the Birds of the World (HBW) retains it in Basileuterus as does the South American Classification Committee as of early 2026. As of July 2026 the most recent versions of the IOC, Clements, and AviList taxonomies place it in Myiothlypis.

All of the above taxonomies agree that the grey-headed warbler is monotypic.

== Description ==
The grey-headed warbler is about 14 cm (5.5 in) long. The sexes have the same plumage. Adults have a dark grey head with a short white streak above the lores, white flecks on the ear coverts, a white chin, and a yellow throat. Their upperparts, wings, and tail are olive-green. Their underparts are yellow. They have a dark iris, a blackish bill, and dusky pinkish legs and feet. Juveniles have an entirely gray hood than extends to the chest, brownish upperparts, paler brownish underparts, and paler legs than adults.

== Distribution and habitat ==
As of 2003 the grey-headed warbler was positively known from only two locations in northeastern Venezuela, Cerro Negro and Cerro Turumiquire, and had not been seen in the latter since the 1960s. By 2008 three more sites had been added. Intensive surveys in the Macizo Montañoso del Turimiquire (MMT), "a small and isolated mountain range" that includes Cerro Turumiquire found the species widespread but thinly distributed. "It was observed using several types of forest habitat, including undisturbed mature cloud-forests, second growth forests, and disturbed regenerating forests." In elevation the known sites are between 1,200 and 2,580 m (3,900 and 8,500 ft).

== Behavior ==
=== Movement ===
The grey-headed warbler is probably a sedentary year-round resident, though some historical records hint at elevational movements between the seasons.

=== Feeding ===
The grey-headed warbler's diet has not been studied but is probably primarily insects and other invertebrates. It has been observed foraging from the forest understory to its sub-canopy and often joining mixed-species feeding flocks.

=== Breeding ===
The gray-headed warbler apparently breeds between May and July. The one known nest was a domed cup with a side entrance; it was made mostly from bamboo leaves, several types of palm fiber, dry leaves, and twigs lined with kapok fluff. It was on the ground hidden in grass and held one egg. Nothing else is known about the species' breeding biology.

=== Vocalization ===
The grey-headed warbler's song is "a lively, slurred, melodic (hu)wee-che-tseew, repeated several times". Its calls include "a thin tsip [a] harsher tseck or chack when excited and tseng in response to song".

== Status ==
The IUCN originally in 1988 assessed the grey-headed warbler as Threatened, then in 1994 as Critically Endangered, in 2000 as Endangered, and since 2025 as Near Threatened. It has a very restricted range; its population size is not known and is believed to be decreasing. "The entire Turumiquire Massif is under severe human pressure, which, through widespread clearance for agriculture and pasture, has resulted in extensive degradation of its montane forests. Even in El Guácharo National Park (incorporating Cerro Negro), there is forest clearance, burning and removal of the understorey for coffee." Though it has been observed in somewhat degraded forest, it "is always recorded in close proximity to undisturbed forest however and is unlikely to persist successfully in its absence".
