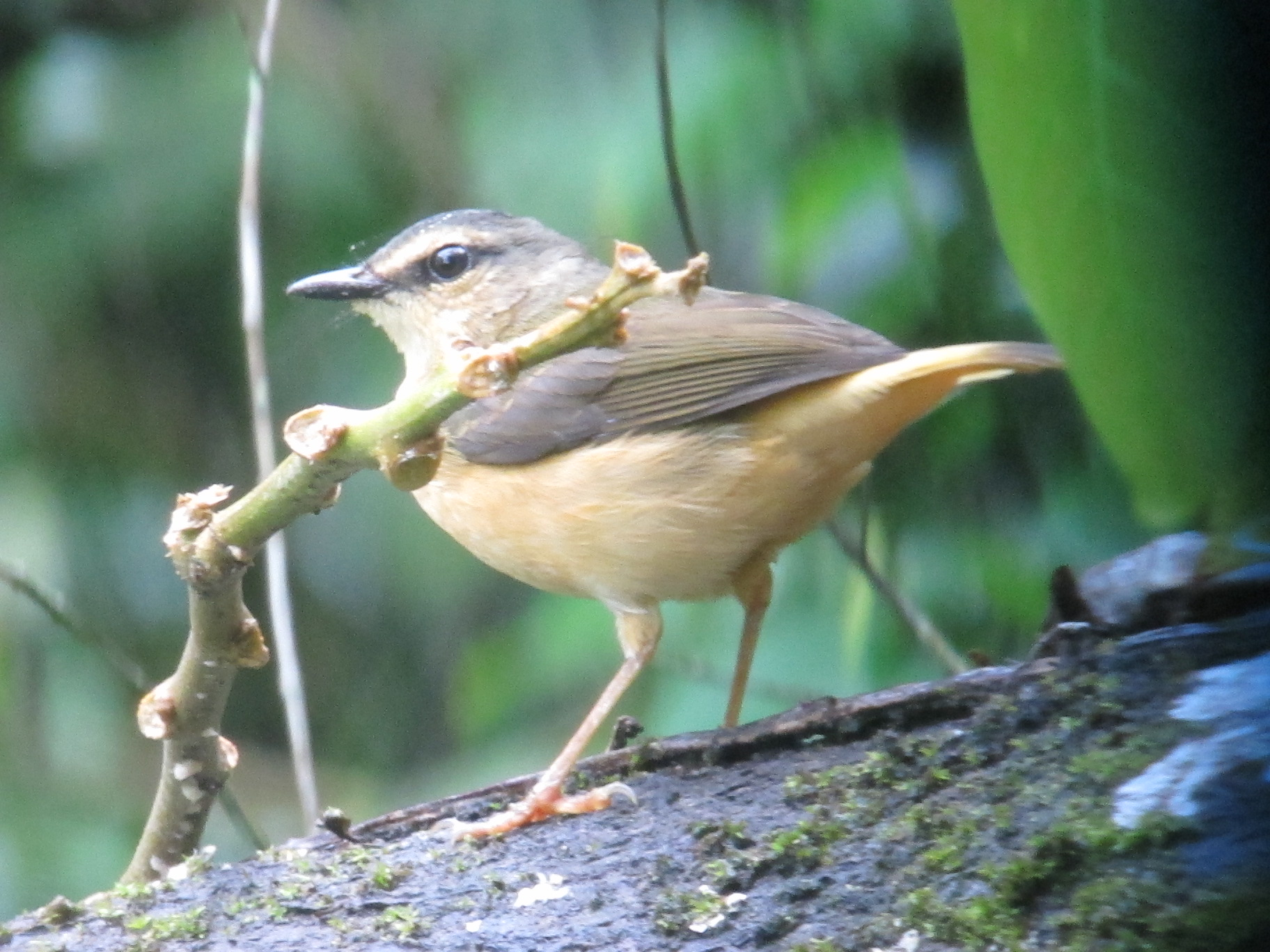

Conservation status
- Least Concern (IUCN 3.1)

Scientific classification
- Kingdom: Animalia
- Phylum: Chordata
- Class: Aves
- Order: Passeriformes
- Family: Parulidae
- Genus: Myiothlypis
- Species: M. fulvicauda

Binomial name
- Myiothlypis fulvicauda (Spix, 1825)
- Range of M. fulvicauda

Synonyms
- See text

= Buff-rumped warbler =

Species of bird

The buff-rumped warbler (Myiothlypis fulvicauda) is a species of bird in the family Parulidae, the New World warblers. It is found from Honduras south to Bolivia.

== Taxonomy and systematics ==
The buff-rumped warbler was formally described in 1825 with the binomial Muscicapa fulvicauda.

The buff-rumped warbler has a complicated taxonomic history since its original description. At some time in the nineteenth century it was reassigned to genus Basileuterus that had been erected in 1848. In 1929 W. E. Clyde Todd erected a new genus, Phaeothlypis, with it as the type species. However, many authors retained it in Basileuterus. In the early twenty-first century several studies confirmed that many species in Phaeothlypis were nested within Basileuterus but that the latter was polyphyletic. By 2007 taxonomic systems had begun to resurrect genus Myiothlypis, which had been erected in 1850, for the buff-rumped warbler and many other species.

The buff-rumped warbler has these six subspecies:

- M. f. leucopygia (Sclater, PL & Salvin, 1873)
- M. f. veraguensis (Sharpe, 1885)
- M. f. semicervina (Sclater, PL, 1860)
- M. f. motacilla (Miller, AH, 1952)
- M. f. fulvicauda (Spix, 1825)
- M. f. significans (Zimmer, JT, 1949)

Some late twentieth century authors treated the buff-rumped warbler and the riverbank warbler (M. rivularis) as conspecific, and there is some evidence that they form a superspecies.

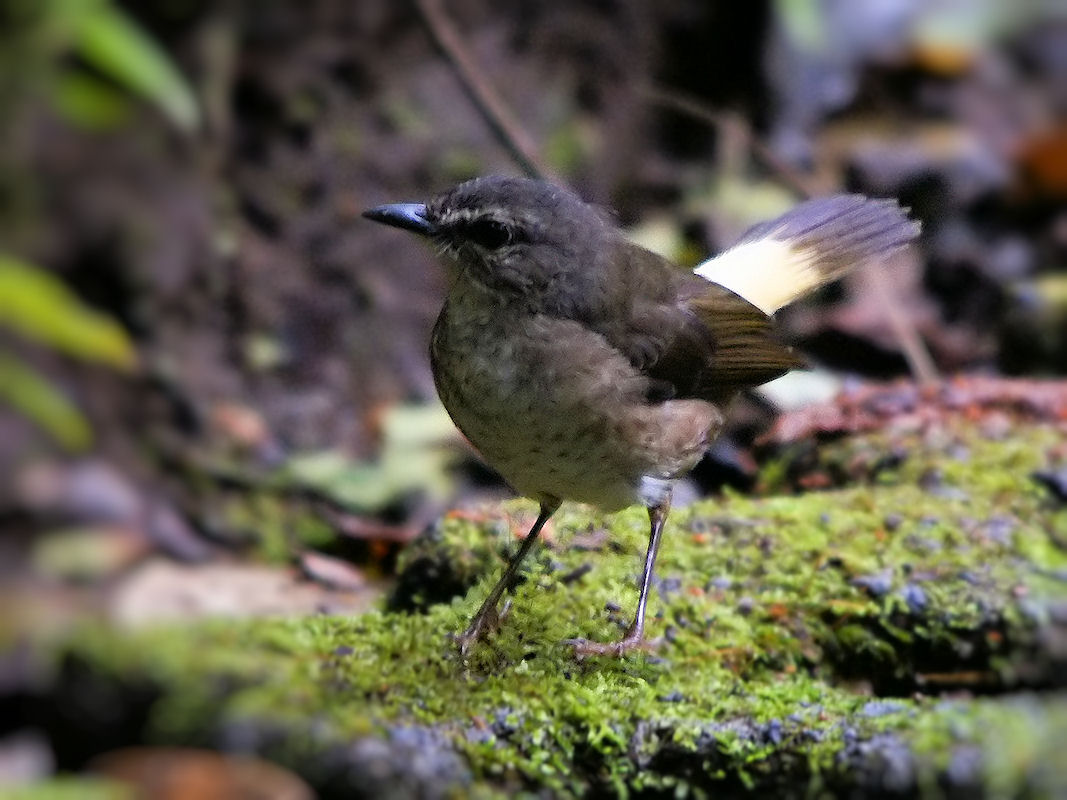
Subspecies M. f. leucopygia

== Description ==
The buff-rumped warbler is 13.5 cm (5.3 in) long and weighs about 15 g (0.53 oz). The sexes have the same plumage. Adults of the nominate subspecies M. f. fulvicauda have a slate-gray crown, a buff supercilium, a blackish stripe through the eye, olive-gray ear coverts, and buffy cheeks. Their nape is olive-gray, their back and wings grayish olive, and their lower rump, uppertail coverts, and basal half of the tail feathers are tawny-buff. The other half of their tail is dark olive-brown. Their throat and underparts are whitish with a buff wash on the breast and flanks and richer buff undertail coverts. Adults of all subspecies have a dark iris, a blackish bill, and pale yellowish pink legs and feet. Juveniles have a dark brown head, back, rump, and breast. Their tail is like the adult's. Their belly and undertail coverts are pale buff and they have a mostly pale dusky pink bill.

The other subspecies of the buff-rumped warbler differ from the nominate and each other thus:

- M. f. leucopygia: darker cheeks, browner crown and upperparts, and paler straw-buff rump and upper tail than nominate; olive spots on the breast
- M. f. veraguensis: similar to leucopygia with darker rump and upper 2/3 of tail and less distinct breast spots
- M. f. semicervina: richer buff rump and basal 3/4 of tail and buffier underparts than nominate
- M. f. motacilla: rump and tail pattern like semicervina but paler straw/yellow; paler greener upperparts and whiter underparts than nominate
- M. f. significans: rump and only basal 1/4 of tail are pale buff; more greenish upperparts than nominate

== Distribution and habitat ==
The buff-rumped warbler has a disjunct distribution. The ranges of M. f. fulvicauda and M. f. significans are contiguous but are separate from the contiguous ranges of the other four subspecies. The subspecies are found thus:

- M. f. leucopygia: slightly in northern Honduras, then from eastern Honduras south on the Caribbean slope through Nicaragua and Costa Rica into western Panama
- M. f. veraguensis: Pacific slope from central Puntarenas Province in Costa Rica to central Panama
- M. f. semicervina: from eastern Panama into northern Colombia and south between the Pacific and the Andes through western Colombia and the northern half of Ecuador; from there in the Andean foothills south into far northwestern Peru
- M. f. motacilla: upper Magdalena River Valley in central Colombia
- M. f. fulvicauda: the western Amazon Basin from southeastern Colombia south through eastern Ecuador to central Peru and from those countries east into Brazil to the Madeira and Teles Pires rivers and into northern Bolivia
- M. f. significans: southeastern Peru

The buff-rumped warbler inhabits forest landscapes along large and small watercourses in the foothills and in swamps in the lowlands. In elevation it ranges from sea level to 1,000 m (3,300 ft) in Honduras, to 1,000 m (3,300 ft) on the Caribbean slope and 1,500 m (4,900 ft) on the Pacific slope of Costa Rica, to 1,700 m (5,600 ft) in Colombia, and to about 1,000 m (3,300 ft) in Ecuador. It is found up to 1,200 m (3,900 ft) in Peru and to 1,000 m (3,300 ft) in Brazil.

== Behavior ==
=== Movement ===
The buff-rumped warbler is a sedentary year-round resident.

=== Feeding ===
The buff-rumped warbler feeds primarily on insects and other invertebrates. Single birds and pairs hop along the forest floor and along fallen logs while continuously pumping and wagging their tails. The species mostly gleans its prey but takes some in mid-air with a sally from the ground. It forages along watercourses, around wet areas of forest floor, and by temporary puddles along forest paths. At least in Costa Rica it often attends swarms of army ants.

=== Breeding ===
The buff-rumped warbler's breeding season has not been defined but spans at least April to August in Costa Rica and includes February in Colombia. Pairs defend a linear territory along a watercourse year-round. The species' nest is a bulky domed cup with a side entrance. Both sexes build it from plant fibers lined with softer material, and typically place it on a sloping earthen bank by a stream or path. The clutch is two eggs. Incubation usually takes 16 to 17 days but up to 19 days is known. Fledging occurs 13 to 14 days after hatch.

=== Vocalization ===
The male buff-rumped warbler's song is "a short warble which runs into a series of 8–9 loud ringing 'chew' notes". Females sometimes reply with a short warble. It has been transcribed as sawee-sawee-tee-tee-see-see-TEW-TEW-TEW-TEW-TEW-TEW-TEW-TEW-TEW-TEW-TEW". Its call is "an emphatic tschick" or a "hollow peak!".

== Status ==
The IUCN has assessed the buff-rumped warbler as being of Least Concern. It has a very large range; its estimated population of at least five million mature individuals is believed to be decreasing. No immediate threats have been identified. It is considered uncommon in Honduras, common in Costa Rica, common in most of Colombia but rare in the east, fairly common in Peru, and "frequent to uncommon" in Brazil.
