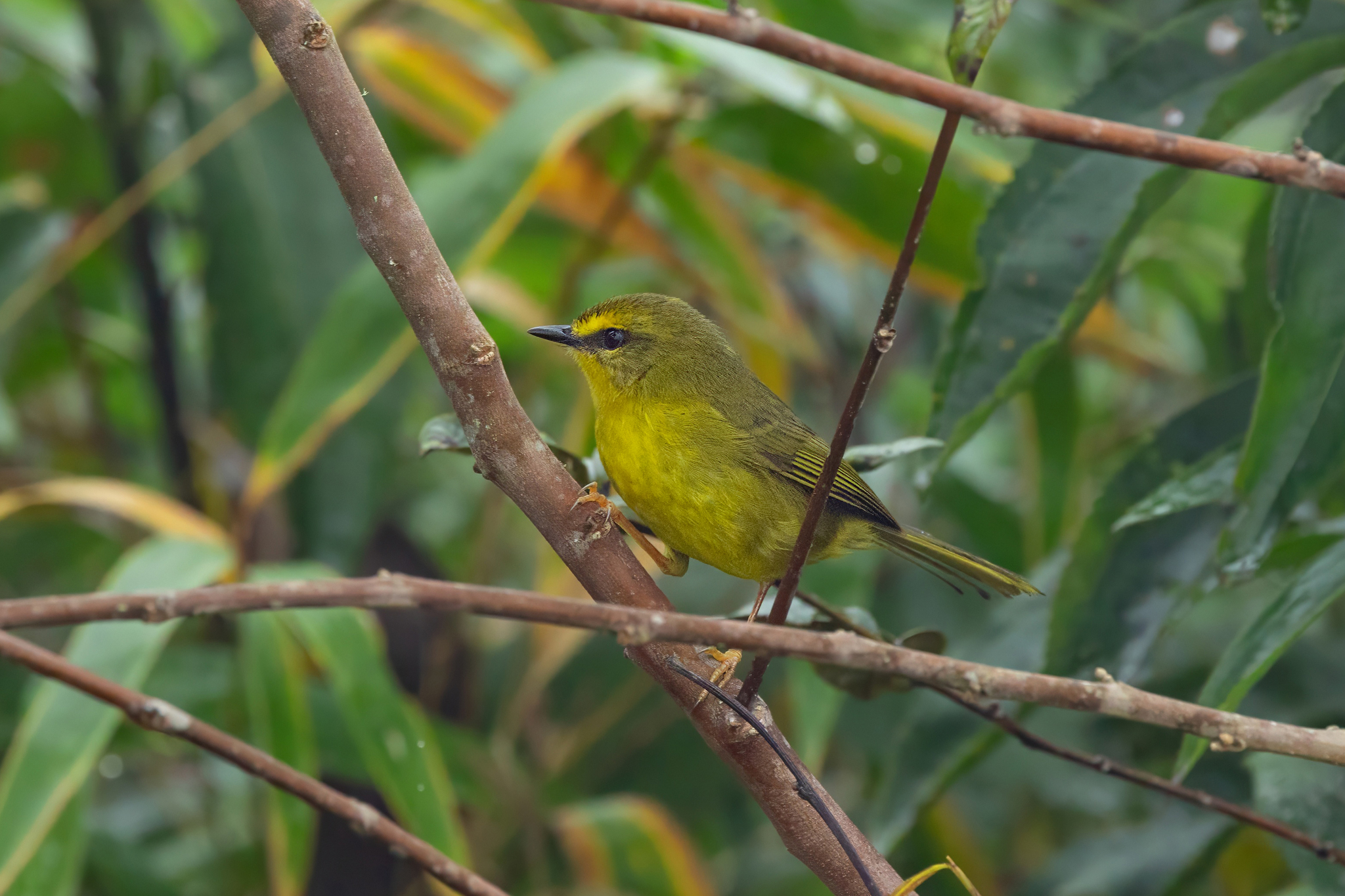

Conservation status
- Least Concern (IUCN 3.1)

Scientific classification
- Kingdom: Animalia
- Phylum: Chordata
- Class: Aves
- Order: Passeriformes
- Family: Parulidae
- Genus: Myiothlypis
- Species: M. signata

Binomial name
- Myiothlypis signata (Berlepsch & Stolzmann, 1906)

Synonyms
- Basileuterus signatus

= Pale-legged warbler =

Species of bird

The pale-legged warbler (Myiothlypis signata) is a species of bird in the family Parulidae, the New World warblers. It is found in Argentina, Bolivia, and Peru.

== Taxonomy and systematics ==
The pale-legged warbler was formally described in 1906 with the binomial Basileuterus signatus. By 2012 the IOC had assigned it to Myiothlypis. BirdLife International's Handbook of the Birds of the World (HBW) did so in 2016.

The pale-legged warbler has two subspecies, the nominate M. s. signata (Berlepsch & Stolzmann, 1906) and M. s. flavovirens (Todd, 1929).

== Description ==
The pale-legged warbler is 13.5 cm (5.3 in) long and weighs 12.1 to 13.4 g (0.43 to 0.47 oz). The sexes have the same plumage. Adults of the nominate subspecies have a mostly olive-green head with dusky lores, a short yellow supercilium, a blackish stripe through the eye, a yellow crescent under the eye, and a yellow throat. Their nape, upperparts, wings, and tail are olive-green. Their underparts are yellow with a faint olive wash on the sides of the breast and flanks. Subspecies M. s. flavovirens is overall slightly brighter than the nominate and has a thin blackish edge along the top of the supercilium. Both subspecies have a dark iris, a blackish bill, and yellowish pink legs and feet. Juveniles have mostly dark brown upperparts with some olive tone on the wings and tail. Their underparts are a lighter, buffier brown. Their bill and legs are paler than adults'.

== Distribution and habitat ==
The pale-legged warbler's nominate subspecies is the more northerly of the two. One source places it in central Peru's Pasco and Junín departments. Another continues that range further south into the departments of Ayacucho and Cuzco but the cited survey does not state which subspecies was found there. Subspecies M. s. flavovirens is found from Cuzco south through Puno department and Bolivia into far northern Argentina's Jujuy and Salta provinces. Much doubt has been cast on a specimen from Colombia that was identified as this species; the species is not included in the list of Colombian bird species.

The pale-legged warbler inhabits the interior and edges of humid montane forest, where it favors dense undergrowth along small watercourses and also stands of Chusquea bamboo. Sources differ slightly on its elevational range. One states it is mostly 1,800 to 3,050 m (5,900 to 10,000 ft) but is found as low as 1,500 m (4,900 ft) in Argentina. Another says it ranges between 1,700 and 2,900 m (5,600 and 9,500 ft) in Peru.

== Behavior ==
=== Movement ===
The pale-legged warbler is a sedentary year-round resident.

=== Feeding ===
The pale-legged warbler's diet has not been studied but is assumed to be mostly or entirely invertebrates. It forages mostly in pairs or family groups, usually within about 2 m (7 ft) of the ground. It takes prey by gleaning from dense low undergrowth but also takes some prey on the wing. In the non-breeding season it sometimes joins mixed-species feeding flocks.

=== Breeding ===
The pale-legged warbler's breeding season appears to span at least December to February in Peru but is otherwise unknown. Nothing else is known about the species' breeding biology.

=== Vocalization ===
The pale-legged warbler's song is "an accelerating series of ringing notes that rises and falls before ending with a more rapid flourish". It call is "a low djitit" that is sometimes extended as a chatter.

== Status ==
The IUCN has assessed the pale-legged warbler as being of Least Concern. It has a large range; its population size is not known and is believed to be decreasing. No immediate threats have been identified. It is considered fairly common in most of its Peruvian range.
