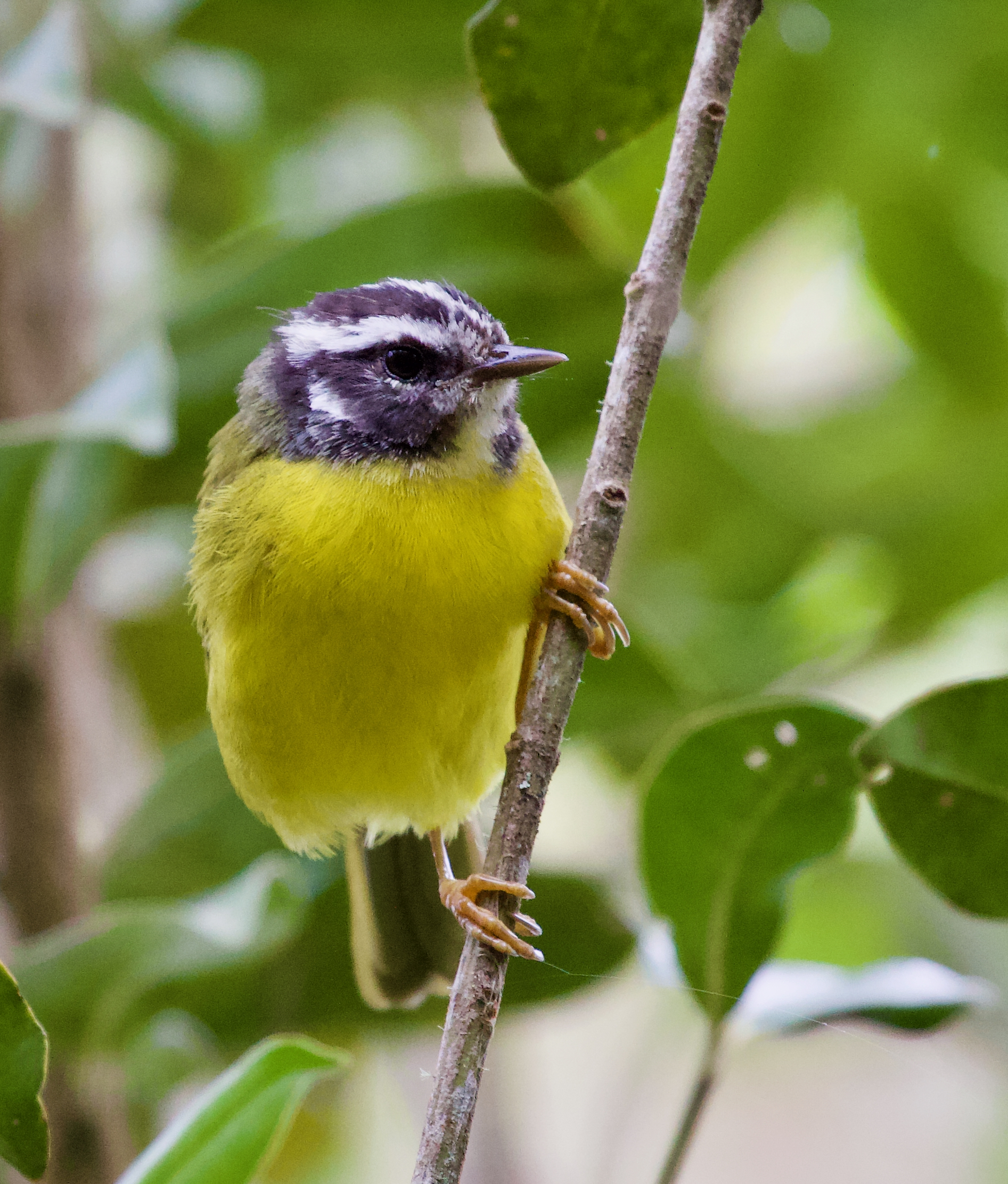

Conservation status
- Near Threatened (IUCN 3.1)

Scientific classification
- Kingdom: Animalia
- Phylum: Chordata
- Class: Aves
- Order: Passeriformes
- Family: Parulidae
- Genus: Myiothlypis
- Species: M. basilica

Binomial name
- Myiothlypis basilica (Todd, 1913)

Synonyms
- See text

= Santa Marta warbler =

Species of bird

The Santa Marta warbler (Myiothlypis basilica) is a Near Threatened species of bird in the family Parulidae, the New World warblers. It is endemic to the Sierra Nevada de Santa Marta in northern Colombia.

== Taxonomy and systematics ==
The Santa Marta warbler was formally described in 1913 as Hemispingus basilicus, mistakenly classifying it as a Thraupidae tanager. At some point it was reassigned to genus Basileuterus. A molecular phylogenetic study published in 2012 suggested that it be moved to its present genus Myiothlypis. The IOC made that change in 2014 and BirdLife International's Handbook of the Birds of the World in 2016.

The Santa Marta warbler is monotypic.

== Description ==
The Santa Marta warbler is 14 to 15 cm (5.5 to 5.9 in) long. The sexes have the same plumage. Adults have a white central crown, long and wide supercilium, crescent under the eye, crescent on the ear coverts, and throat on an otherwise black head. Their upperparts, wings, and tail are olive-green. Their throat and underparts are yellow. They have a dark iris, a blackish bill, and dull pinkish legs and feet.

== Distribution and habitat ==
The Santa Marta warbler is found only in the Sierra Nevada de Santa Marta, an isolated mountain range in northern Colombia. It inhabits the understory and edges of humid stunted forest in the temperate zone. It especially favors stands of Chusquea bamboo. In elevation it ranges between 2,200 and 3,000 m (7,200 and 9,800 ft).

== Behavior ==
=== Movement ===
The Santa Marta warbler is a sedentary year-round resident.

=== Feeding ===
The Santa Marta warbler's diet has not been studied but is believed to be entirely or almost entirely invertebrates. It takes most prey by gleaning in the forest's lower levels, mostly below about 4 m (13 ft). It forages in pairs or small groups that often join mixed-species feeding flocks.

=== Breeding ===
The Santa Marta warbler's breeding season has not been determined but evidence suggests it spans at least March to August. Nothing else is known about the species' breeding biology.

=== Vocalization ===
The Santa Marta warbler's song is "a fast, high chatter". Its call is "a short weak trill".

== Status ==
The IUCN originally in 1988 assessed the Santa Marta warbler as being of Least Concern and in 1994 as Near Threatened, in 2004 as Vulnerable, and in 2021 again as Near Threatened. It has a small range; its estimated population of between 1000 and 3000 mature individuals is believed to bed stable. "Despite tolerating some habitat degradation, the major threat to the species is habitat loss....The principal causes of deforestation are the development of cattle ranches and Pinus plantations". However, by 2020 the pace of deforestation had slowed. It is considered locally common. It might persist "in scrubby habitat above tree-line, suggesting that it may possess some tolerance of deforestation".
