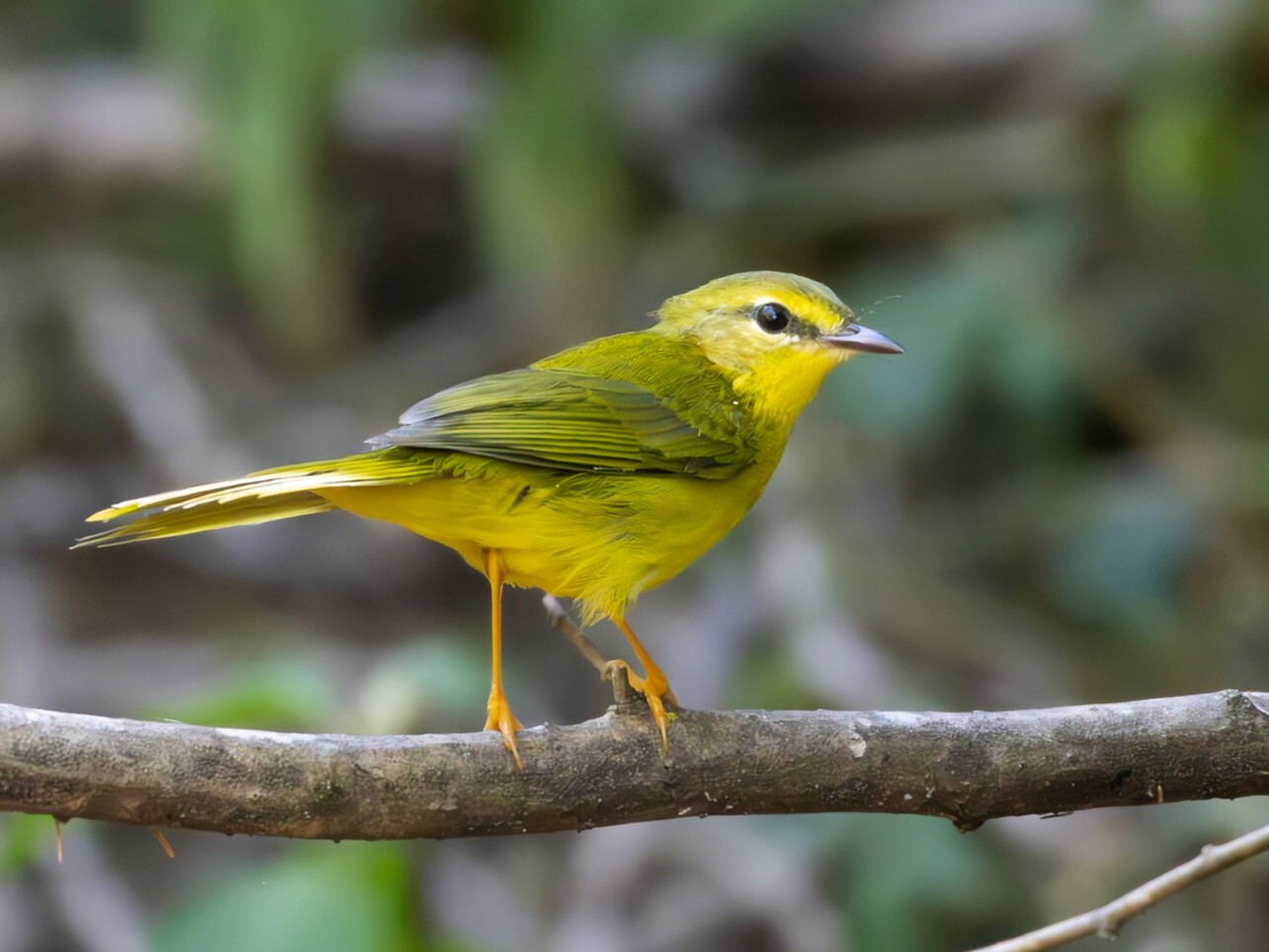

Conservation status
- Least Concern (IUCN 3.1)

Scientific classification
- Kingdom: Animalia
- Phylum: Chordata
- Class: Aves
- Order: Passeriformes
- Family: Parulidae
- Genus: Myiothlypis
- Species: M. flaveola

Binomial name
- Myiothlypis flaveola Baird, 1865

Synonyms
- See text

= Flavescent warbler =

Species of bird

The flavescent warbler (Myiothlypis flaveola) is a species of bird in the family Parulidae, the New World warblers. It is found in Argentina, Bolivia, Brazil, Colombia, Guyana, Paraguay, and Venezuela. Its specific epithet and English name derive from the Latin flaveolus meaning yellowish.

== Taxonomy and systematics ==
The flavescent warbler was formally described in 1865 with its present binomial Myiothlypis flaveolus. For a time it and a few other species were placed in genus Phaeothlypis and also in Basileuterus. By 2012 the IOC had returned it to Myiothlypis. BirdLife International's Handbook of the Birds of the World (HBW) did so in 2016.

The flavescent warbler's further taxonomy is unsettled. The IOC, the Clements taxonomy, and AviList assign it two subspecies, the nominate M. f. flaveola (Baird, 1865) and M. f. pallidirostris (Oren, 1985). However, HBW does not recognize M. f. pallidirostris and treats the flavescent warbler as monotypic. Some authors have suggested that M. f. pallidirostris could be a separate species.

This article follows the majority two-subspecies model.

== Description ==
The flavescent warbler is about 14.5 cm (5.7 in) long and weighs 9 to 16 g (0.32 to 0.56 oz). The sexes have the same plumage. Adults of the nominate subspecies have an olive-green crown, a yellow supercilium that becomes olive-yellow past the eye, a dusky stripe through the eye, a yellow crescent under the eye, and yellow cheeks and ear coverts. Their nape, upperparts, wings, and tail are olive-green. Their throat and underparts are yellow. They have a dark iris, a blackish bill, and orange-pink legs and feet. Subspecies M. f. pallidirostris has a dusky bill and a light olive tinge on the sides and flanks.

== Distribution and habitat ==
The flavescent warbler has a disjunct distribution. Subspecies M. f. pallidirostris is the more northerly of the two. It is found in three populations, in the upper Cauca River valley in central Colombia, from northeastern Colombia intermittently on both slopes of the Venezuelan Andes and the Venezuelan Coastal Range to eastern Miranda state, and in southern Guyana. The nominate subspecies is found from eastern Bolivia east across Brazil south of a line roughly from Rondônia to Ceará. Its range continues south through central Paraguay slightly into northern Argentina's Formosa Province and in Brazil to a line roughly from central Mato Grosso do Sul not quite to the Atlantic in São Paulo state and then north to the coast in central Bahia.

The flavescent warbler inhabits dry deciduous and semi-deciduous forest, gallery forest, and shrubby clearings and edges. In elevation it ranges between 200 and 1,000 m (700 and 3,300 ft) in Colombia and between 250 and 1,200 m (800 and 3,900 ft) in Venezuela; in Brazil it ranges from sea level to 1,000 m (3,300 ft).

== Behavior ==
=== Movement ===
The flavescent warbler is a sedentary year-round resident.

=== Feeding ===
The flavescent warbler feeds on insects and other arthropods. It forages on the ground or not far above it in vegetation. It hops along the ground and finds prey by turning over leaves with its bill. It forages singly and in pairs and does not join mixed-species feeding flocks.

=== Breeding ===
The flavescent warbler's breeding seasons have not been defined but include October in Colombia and possibly September to January in Brazil. Its nest is a globe made from plant material like grass and leaves; it has a side entrance. It is placed on the ground or very close above it. One nest held three eggs. Nothing else is known about the species' breeding biology.

=== Vocalization ===
The song of the flavescent warbler's nominate subspecies is a "double-voiced series, basically an extr. high series of 5-6 fififi-fififi- notes; after the 1st two notes, mid-high tjeh-tjeh-ejeh-tjeh is interwoven". That of M. f. pallidirostris is "sharp, jerky, and delivered quickly, ek, Ease-a Ease-a, E, chéw-chéw-chéw or seeka-seeka-SEETA, chew-chew-chew".

== Status ==
The IUCN has assessed the flavescent warbler as being of Least Concern. It has a large range; its population size is not known and is believed to be decreasing. No immediate threats have been identified. It is considered local in Colombia, fairly common in Venezuela, and "frequent to uncommon" in Brazil.
