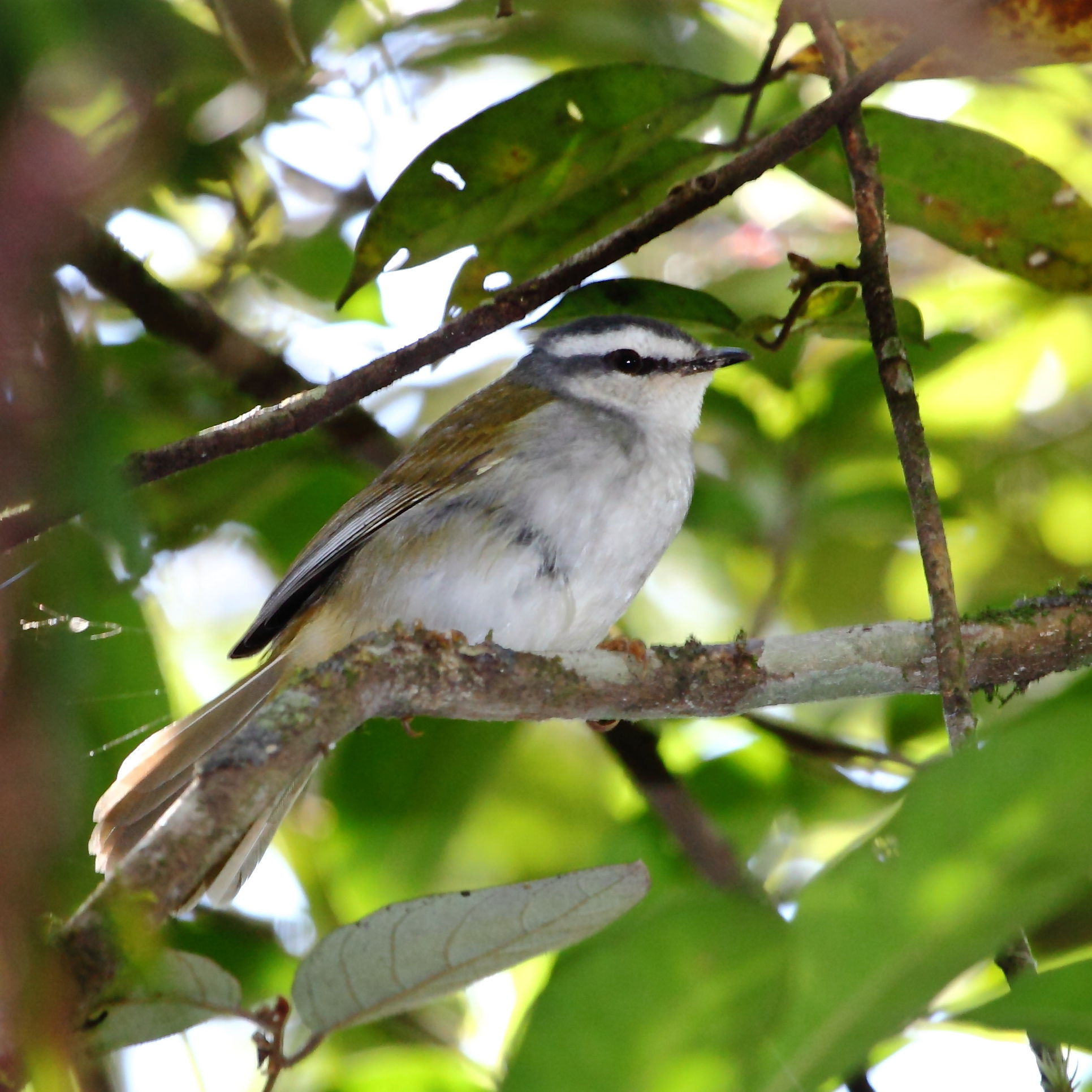
- at Dourado, São Paulo State, Brazil

Conservation status
- Least Concern (IUCN 3.1)]

Scientific classification
- Kingdom: Animalia
- Phylum: Chordata
- Class: Aves
- Order: Passeriformes
- Family: Parulidae
- Genus: Myiothlypis
- Species: M. leucophrys

Binomial name
- Myiothlypis leucophrys (Pelzeln, 1868)

Synonyms
- Basileuterus leucophrys

= White-striped warbler =

Species of bird

The white-striped warbler (Myiothlypis leucophrys) is a species of bird in the family Parulidae, the New World warblers. It is endemic to Brazil.

== Taxonomy and systematics ==
The white-striped warbler was formally described in 1868 as Basileuterus leucophrys. By 2012 the IOC had reassigned it to its present genus Myiothlypis. BirdLife International's Handbook of the Birds of the World (HBW) did so in 2016.

The white-striped warbler is monotypic.

== Description ==
The white-striped warbler is 14 cm (5.5 in) long and weighs 15 to 22 g (0.53 to 0.78 oz). The sexes have the same plumage. Adults have a gray central crown with thin blackish stripes bordering it, a long and wide white supercilium, a blackish stripe through the eye, white cheeks, and pale buff ear coverts. Their nape and the sides of their neck are gray and their upperparts, wings, and tail brownish olive. Their throat and underparts are mostly white with gray sides on the breast, grayish buff rear flanks, and yellowish buff undertail coverts. They have a dark iris, a blackish bill, and yellowish pink legs and feet.

== Distribution and habitat ==
The white-striped warbler is found in south-central Brazil in a rough triangle formed by southern Mato Grosso, central Goiás, southern Tocantins, and southern Minas Gerais - northern São Paulo state. It almost exclusively inhabits riparian forest with dense undergrowth. In elevation it ranges from near sea level to 1,000 m (3,300 ft).

== Behavior ==
=== Movement ===
The white-striped warbler is a sedentary year-round resident.

=== Feeding ===
The white-striped warbler's diet has not been studied but is believed to be entirely or almost entirely invertebrates. It takes most prey while walking or hopping on or near the ground. It seldom joins mixed-species feeding flocks.

=== Breeding ===
The white-striped warbler's breeding season appears to span from September to January, though pairs maintain their territories year-round. Its nest is a globe made from thin roots and twigs with leaves on the sides and bottom; it has a side entrance. It is usually on a small hummock and sometimes close to water. The known clutches have been of two to four eggs. The shiny cowbird (Molothrus bonariensis) is an occasional brood parasite. Nothing else is known about the species' breeding biology.

=== Vocalization ===
The white-striped warbler's song is a "series of pure, fluted notes, some of these as double notes or short trill fufu-fuhfuh-prrrr-ppruh and similar series, with notes varying in sequence and pitch". Its call is an "extr. high tinkling".

== Status ==
The IUCN has assessed the white-striped warbler as being of Least Concern. It has a large range; its population size is not known and is believed to be decreasing. No immediate threats have been identified. It is considered "uncommon to rare" in the western and southern reaches of its range and "frequent to uncommon" in the rest of it. "Although not currently considered at risk, its riparian habitat is rapidly being cleared and the situation should be closely monitored."
