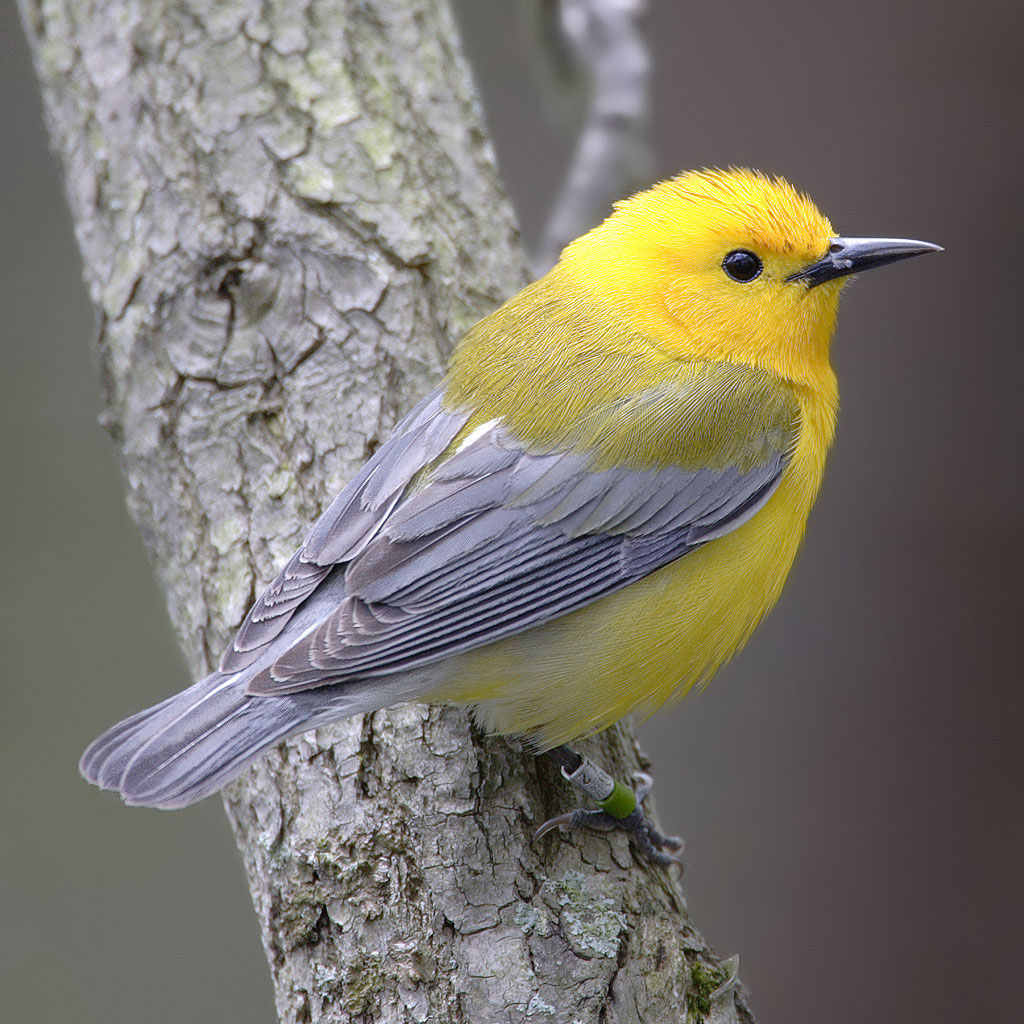
- Prothonotary warbler (Protonotaria citrea)

Scientific classification
- Kingdom: Animalia
- Phylum: Chordata
- Class: Aves
- Order: Passeriformes
- Superfamily: Emberizoidea
- Family: Parulidae; Wetmore et al., 1947

Type genus
- Parula Bonaparte, 1838

Synonyms
- Mniotiltidae

= New World warbler =

Family of birds

The New World warblers or wood-warblers are a group of small, often colorful, passerine birds that make up the family Parulidae and are restricted to the New World. The family contains 116 species. They are not closely related to Old World warblers or Australian warblers. Most are arboreal, but some, like the ovenbird and the two waterthrushes, are primarily terrestrial. Most members of this family are insectivores.

This group likely originated in northern Central America, where the greatest number of species and diversity between them is found. From there, they spread north during the interglacial periods, mainly as migrants, returning to the ancestral region in winter. Two genera, Myioborus and Basileuterus, seem to have colonized South America early, perhaps before the two continents were linked, and together constitute most warbler species of that region.

The scientific name for the family, Parulidae, originates from the fact that Linnaeus in 1758 named the northern parula as a tit, Parus americanus, and as taxonomy developed, the genus name was modified first to Parulus and then to Parula. The family name derives from the name for the genus.

== Taxonomy ==
The family Parulidae was introduced for the New World warblers in 1947 by American ornithologist Alexander Wetmore and collaborators with Parula as the type genus. Parula is now considered as a junior synonym of Setophaga.

The family was formerly thought to be sister to a clade containing the yellow-breasted chat in its own family Icteriidae, the wrenthrush in its own family Zeledoniidae, the two Cuban warblers in the family Teretistridae and the 109 species in the family Icteridae. However, more recent studies recover them as sister to a clade containing just the yellow-breasted chat and the Icteridae, with the clade containing all three families being sister to a clade containing the chat-tanagers in Calyptophilidae, the wrenthrush, and the Phaenicophilidae.

A molecular phylogenetic study of the Parulidae published in 2010 found that the species formed several major clades that did not align with the traditional genera. This led to a major reorganization of the species within the family to create monophyletic genera. The changes have generally followed the recommendations of the authors of the study except in a few cases where the proposed genera were split.

A large clade that included the 29 species then placed in the genus Dendroica, also included four species of Parula, one of the three species of Wilsonia and the monotypic genera Catharopeza and Setophaga. All members of the clade apart from Catharopeza were placed in the expanded genus Setophaga Swainson, 1827, which under the rules of the International Code of Zoological Nomenclature, had priority over Dendroica Gray, 1842, Wilsonia Bonaparte, 1838, and Parula Bonaparte, 1838.

The species that had traditionally been placed in Basileuterus formed two clades. One group retains the genus name as it includes the golden-crowned warbler, the type species for the genus. The other larger group, now with 18 species, is placed in the resurrected genus Myiothlypis Cabanis, 1850, as it contains the type species, the black-crested warbler.

The genus Myioborus containing the whitestarts remained unchanged after the reorganization but six genera were no longer used: Dendroica, Ergaticus, Euthlypis, Parula, Wilsonia, and Phaeothlypis.

The following genus level cladogram of the family Parulidae is based on a 2024 molecular genetic study by Min Zhao and collaborators. The endangered whistling warbler (Catharopeza bishopi) and the probably extinct Semper's warbler (Leucopeza semperi) are not included as their positions are uncertain. The number of species in each genus is taken from the AviList taxonomy of the birds of the world.

- Parulidae
  - Seiurus – ovenbird
  - - Helmitheros – worm-eating warbler
    - - Parkesia – 2 species – waterthrushes
      - - - - Oreothlypis – 2 species
            - Leiothlypis – 6 species
          - - Oporornis – Connecticut warbler
            - Geothlypis – 14 species – yellowthroats
        - - - - Vermivora – 3 species
              - - Limnothlypis – Swainson's warbler
                - Protonotaria – prothonotary warbler
            - - Mniotilta – black-and-white warbler
              - - Setophaga – 35 species
                - - Myiothlypis – 17 species
                  - - Euthlypis – fan-tailed warbler
                    - - Basileuterus – 11 species
                      - - Cardellina – 5 species
                        - Myioborus – 12 species – whitestarts

=== Extant Genera ===
The family Parulidae now contains 116 species divided into 19 genera.

Image	Genus	Living species
	Seiurus Swainson, 1827	Ovenbird, Seiurus aurocapilla
	Helmitheros Rafinesque, 1819	Worm-eating warbler, Helmitheros vermivorum
	Parkesia Sangster, 2008	Northern waterthrush, Parkesia noveboracensis; Louisiana waterthrush, Parkesia motacilla
	Vermivora Swainson, 1827	Bachman's warbler, †Vermivora bachmanii (Extinct: Between 1988 and 2023); Blue-winged warbler, Vermivora cyanoptera; Golden-winged warbler, Vermivora chrysoptera
	Mniotilta Vieillot, 1816	Black-and-white warbler, Mniotilta varia
	Protonotaria Baird, 1858	Prothonotary warbler, Protonotaria citrea
	Limnothlypis Stone, 1914	Swainson's warbler, Limnothlypis swainsonii
	Oreothlypis Ridgway, 1884	Flame-throated warbler, Oreothlypis gutturalis; Crescent-chested warbler, Oreothlypis superciliosa
	Leiothlypis Sangster, 2008	Tennessee warbler, Leiothlypis peregrina; Orange-crowned warbler, Leiothlypis celata; Colima warbler, Leiothlypis crissalis; Lucy's warbler, Leiothlypis luciae; Nashville warbler, Leiothlypis ruficapilla; Virginia's warbler, Leiothlypis virginiae
	Leucopeza Sclater, 1876	Semper's warbler, Leucopeza semperi
	Oporornis Baird, 1858	Connecticut warbler, Oporornis agilis
	Geothlypis Cabanis, 1847	Common yellowthroat, Geothlypis trichas; Belding's yellowthroat, Geothlypis beldingi; Altamira yellowthroat, Geothlypis flavovelata; Bahama yellowthroat, Geothlypis rostrata; New Providence yellowthroat, †Geothlypis rostrata rostrata (extinct: 1990s?); Olive-crowned yellowthroat, Geothlypis semiflava; Black-polled yellowthroat, Geothlypis speciosa; Masked yellowthroat, Geothlypis aequinoctialis; Southern yellowthroat, Geothlypis velata; Black-lored yellowthroat, Geothlypis auricularis; Gray-crowned yellowthroat, Geothlypis poliocephala; Hooded yellowthroat, Geothlypis nelsoni; MacGillivray's warbler, Geothlypis tolmiei; Mourning warbler, Geothlypis philadelphia; Kentucky warbler, Geothlypis formosa
	Catharopeza P.L. Sclater, 1880	Whistling warbler, Catharopeza bishopi
	Setophaga Swainson, 1827	Plumbeous warbler, Setophaga plumbea; Elfin woods warbler, Setophaga angelae; Arrowhead warbler, Setophaga pharetra; Hooded warbler, Setophaga citrina; American redstart. Setophaga ruticilla; Kirtland's warbler, Setophaga kirtlandii; Cape May warbler, Setophaga tigrina; Cerulean warbler, Setophaga cerulea; Northern parula, Setophaga americana; Tropical parula, Setophaga pitiayumi; Magnolia warbler, Setophaga magnolia; Bay-breasted warbler, Setophaga castanea; Blackburnian warbler, Setophaga fusca; American yellow warbler, Setophaga aestiva; Mangrove warbler, Setophaga petechia; Chestnut-sided warbler, Setophaga pensylvanica; Blackpoll warbler, Setophaga striata; Black-throated blue warbler, Setophaga caerulescens; Palm warbler, Setophaga palmarum; Olive-capped warbler, Setophaga pityophila; Pine warbler, Setophaga pinus; Myrtle warbler, Setophaga coronata; Audubon's warbler, Setophaga auduboni; Black-fronted warbler, Setophaga auduboni nigrifrons; Goldman's warbler, Setophaga goldmani; Yellow-throated warbler, Setophaga dominica; Bahama warbler, Setophaga flavescens; Vitelline warbler, Setophaga vitellina; Prairie warbler, Setophaga discolor; Adelaide's warbler, Setophaga adelaidae; Barbuda warbler, Setophaga subita; Saint Lucia warbler, Setophaga delicata; Grace's warbler, Setophaga graciae; Black-throated grey warbler, Setophaga nigrescens; Townsend's warbler, Setophaga townsendi; Hermit warbler, Setophaga occidentalis; Golden-cheeked warbler, Setophaga chrysoparia; Black-throated green warbler, Setophaga virens; Yellow-rumped warbler, Setophaga coronata
	Myiothlypis Cabanis, 1850	Citrine warbler, Myiothlypis luteoviridis; Santa Marta warbler, Myiothlypis basilica; White-striped warbler, Myiothlypis leucophrys; Flavescent warbler, Myiothlypis flaveola; Gray-headed warbler, Myiothlypis griseiceps; White-rimmed warbler, Myiothlypis leucoblephara; Black-crested warbler, Myiothlypis nigrocristata; Pale-legged warbler, Myiothlypis signata; Buff-rumped warbler, Myiothlypis fulvicauda; Riverbank warbler, Myiothlypis rivularis; Two-banded warbler, Myiothlypis bivittata; Cuzco warbler, Myiothlypis chrysogaster; Choco warbler, Myiothlypis chlorophrys; White-lored warbler, Myiothlypis conspicillata; Grey-throated warbler, Myiothlypis cinereicollis; Grey-and-gold warbler, Myiothlypis fraseri; Russet-crowned warbler, Myiothlypis coronata
	Basileuterus Cabanis, 1848	Golden-crowned warbler, Basileuterus culicivorus; White-bellied warbler, Basileuterus culicivorus hypoleucus; Three-banded warbler, Basileuterus trifasciatus; Rufous-capped warbler, Basileuterus rufifrons; Chestnut-capped warbler, Basileuterus delattrii; Golden-browed warbler, Basileuterus belli; Black-cheeked warbler, Basileuterus melanogenys; Pirre warbler, Basileuterus ignotus; Three-striped warbler, Basileuterus tristriatus; Yungas warbler, Basileuterus punctipectus; Black-eared warbler, Basileuterus melanotis; Tacarcuna warbler, Basileuterus tacarcunae
	Euthlypis Cabanis, 1851	Fan-tailed warbler, Euthlypis lachrymosa
	Cardellina Bonaparte, 1850	Canada warbler – Cardellina canadensis; Wilson's warbler – Cardellina pusilla; Red-faced warbler – Cardellina rubrifrons; Red warbler – Cardellina rubra; Pink-headed warbler – Cardellina versicolor
	Myioborus Baird, 1865	Painted whitestart, Myioborus pictus; Slate-throated whitestart, Myioborus miniatus; Brown-capped whitestart, Myioborus brunniceps; Yellow-crowned whitestart, Myioborus flavivertex; White-fronted whitestart, Myioborus albifrons; Golden-fronted whitestart, Myioborus ornatus; Spectacled whitestart, Myioborus melanocephalus; Collared whitestart, Myioborus torquatus; Paria whitestart, Myioborus pariae; White-faced whitestart, Myioborus albifacies; Guaiquinima whitestart, Myioborus cardonai; Tepui whitestart, Myioborus castaneocapillus

=== Former species ===
Some species that were previously placed in the Parulidae have been moved to other families:

- Olive warbler (Peucedramus taeniatus) – now in own family Peucedramidae
- Yellow-breasted chat (Icteria virens) – now in own family Icteriidae
- Three species in the genus Granatellus – now in the family Cardinalidae
  - Red-breasted chat (Granatellus venustus)
  - Grey-throated chat (Granatellus sallaei)
  - Rose-breasted chat (Granatellus pelzelni)
- Wrenthrush (Zeledonia coronata) – now in own family Zeledoniidae
- Two species endemic to Hispaniola – now in family Phaenicophilidae
  - Green-tailed warbler (Microligea palustris)
  - White-winged warbler (Xenoligea montana)
- Two species endemic to Cuba in the genus Teretistris – now in own family Teretistridae
  - Yellow-headed warbler (Teretistris fernandinae)
  - Oriente warbler (Teretistris fornsi)

== Description ==
All the warblers are fairly small. The smallest species is Lucy's warbler (Leiothlypis luciae), with a weight of around 6.5 g (0.23 oz) and an average length of 10.6 cm (4.2 in). The Parkesia waterthrushes, the ovenbird, the russet-crowned warbler, and Semper's warbler, all of which can exceed 15 cm (5.9 in) and 21 g (0.74 oz), may be considered the largest.

The migratory species tend to lay larger clutches of eggs, typically up to six, since the hazards of their journeys mean that many individuals will have only one chance to breed. In contrast, the laying of two eggs is typical for many tropical species, since the chicks can be provided with better care, and the adults are likely to have further opportunities for reproduction.

Many migratory species, particularly those which breed further north, have distinctive male plumage at least in the breeding season, since males need to reclaim territory and advertise for mates each year. This tendency is particularly marked in the large genus Setophaga (formerly Dendroica). In contrast, resident tropical species, which pair for life, show little if any sexual dimorphism, but exceptions occur. The Parkesia waterthrushes and ovenbird are strongly migratory, but have identical male and female plumage, whereas the mainly tropical and sedentary yellowthroats are dimorphic. The Granatellus chats also show sexual dimorphism, but due to recent genetic work, have been moved into the family Cardinalidae (New World buntings and cardinals).

The name warbler is a misnomer for the New World group of warblers established before the family was split from the Old World warblers in the 1830s. The Random House Dictionary defines "to warble" as "to sing with trills." Most New World warblers do not warble, but rather "lisp, buzz, hiss, chip, rollick, or zip."
