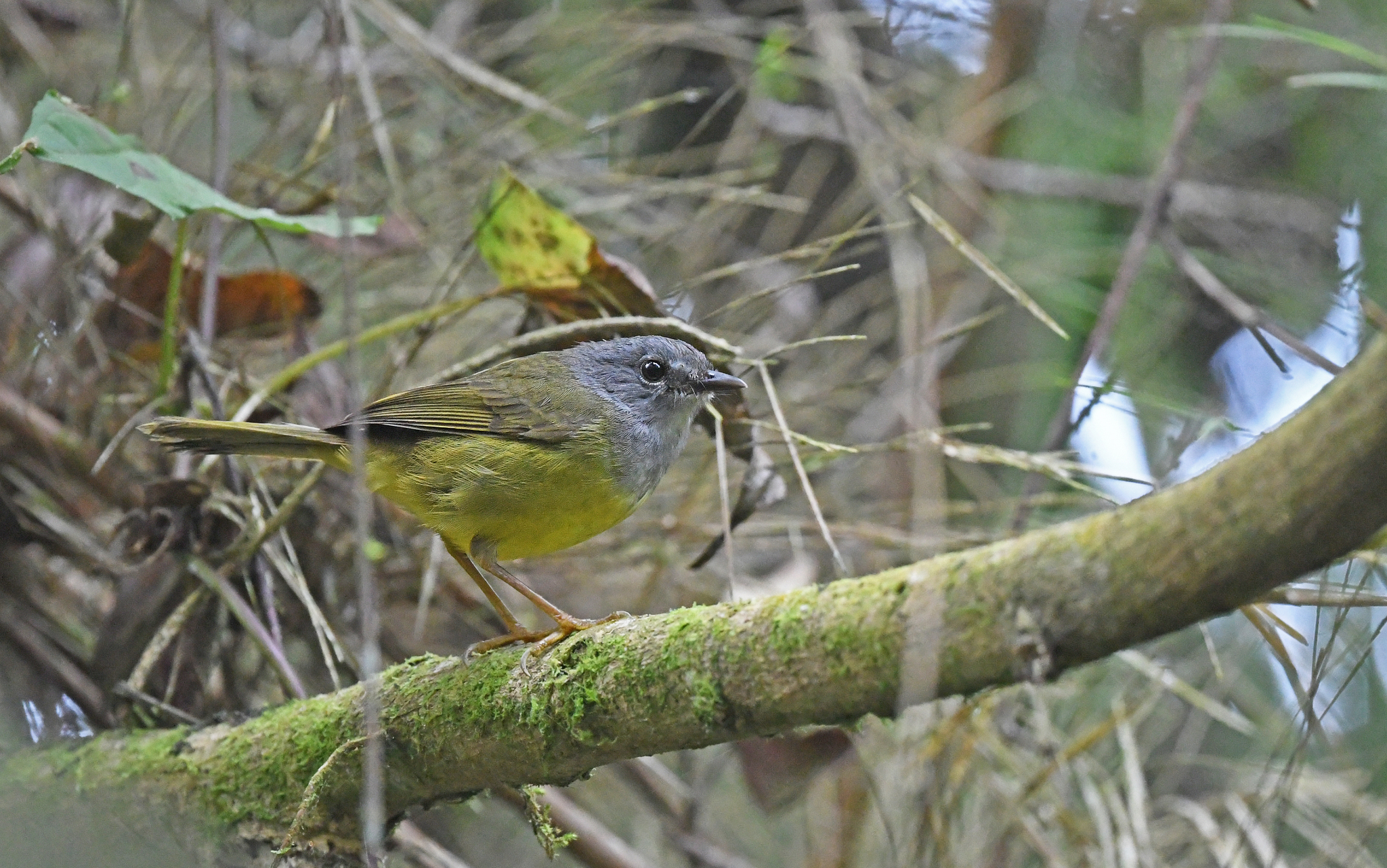

Conservation status
- Least Concern (IUCN 3.1)

Scientific classification
- Kingdom: Animalia
- Phylum: Chordata
- Class: Aves
- Order: Passeriformes
- Family: Parulidae
- Genus: Myiothlypis
- Species: M. cinereicollis

Binomial name
- Myiothlypis cinereicollis (Sclater, PL, 1864)

Synonyms
- Basileuterus cinereicollis

= Grey-throated warbler =

Species of bird

The grey-throated warbler (Myiothlypis cinereicollis) is a species of bird in the family Parulidae, the New World warblers. It is found in Colombia and Venezuela.

== Taxonomy and systematics ==
The grey-throated warbler was formally described in 1864 with the binomial Basileuterus cinereicollis. By 2007 taxonomic systems had begun to resurrect genus Myiothlypis, which had been erected in 1850, for the grey-throated warbler and many other species.

The grey-throated warbler has these three subspecies:

- M. c. pallidula (Wetmore, 1941)
- M. c. zuliensis (Aveledo & Peréz, 1994)
- M. c. cinereicollis (Sclater, PL, 1864)

== Description ==
The grey-throated warbler is about 14 cm (5.5 in) long. The sexes have the same plumage. Adults of the nominate subspecies M. c. cinereicollis have a mostly medium gray head with a bright yellow crown stripe with dark gray borders, a thin blackish line through the eye, and a pale gray throat. Their upperparts, wings, and tail are olive green. Their breast is pale gray and the rest of their underparts are yellow. Subspecies M. c. pallidula averages slightly paler than the nominate but is otherwise the same. M. c. zuliensis has paler olive-gray crown stripes, face, and nape than the nominate, with a paler gray breast and a darker yellow belly. All subspecies have a dark iris, a blackish brown bill, and yellowish pink legs and feet.

== Distribution and habitat ==
The subspecies of the grey-throated warbler are found thus:

- M. c. pallidula: extreme northwestern part of the Serranía del Perijá in northeastern Colombia
- M. c. zuliensis: Serranía del Perijá straddling the Colombia/Venezuela border
- M. c. cinereicollis: Venezuelan Andes in Mérida and Táchira states and south along Colombia's Eastern Andes to the Bogotá area

The grey-throated warbler primarily inhabits the edges and interior of humid premontane forest and is also found in secondary forest whose understory is undisturbed. In Venezuela it ranges in elevation between 1,100 and 2,100 m (3,600 and 6,900 ft) and in Colombia between 600 and 2,000 m (2,000 and 6,600 ft).

== Behavior ==
=== Movement ===
The grey-throated warbler is a sedentary year-round resident.

=== Feeding ===
The grey-throated warbler's diet has not been studied. The species usually forages in the forest understory, remaining in cover. It sometimes joins mixed-species feeding flocks in Colombia but apparently not in Venezuela.

=== Breeding ===
The grey-throated warbler's breeding season has not been defined but includes June. The one known nest was shaped like an oven on a steep earthen bank under an overhang. It was made from bark fibers, twigs, and vines and held two nestlings. Nothing else is known about the species' breeding biology.

=== Vocalization ===
The grey-throated warbler is not highly vocal. What is thought to be its song is "3-6 high-pitched wispy notes, sa see-see-sa-SEE! or swee-swee-se-SEET!, or longer we, we-E-E-a-WEEK!". The song is "variable but always weak and insignificant" and easily overlooked.

== Status ==
The IUCN originally in 1988 assessed the grey-throated warbler as Threatened, then in 1994 as Near Threatened, and since 2023 as of Least Concern. It has a large range; its population size is not known and is believed to be decreasing. "Forests within the range are cleared and degraded, largely for agricultural cultivation, pasture and colonisation. Understory removal for shade-coffee production is perhaps the most important threat at present." The species is considered "rare and/or local" in Venezuela and uncommon in Colombia.
