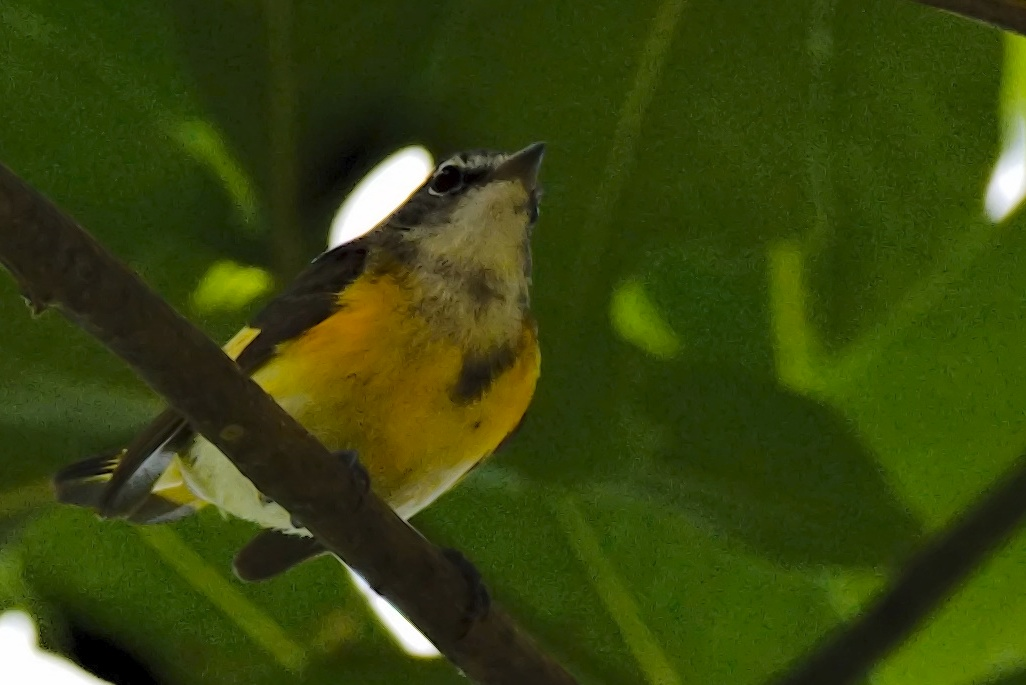

Conservation status
- Near Threatened (IUCN 3.1)

Scientific classification
- Kingdom: Animalia
- Phylum: Chordata
- Class: Aves
- Order: Passeriformes
- Family: Parulidae
- Genus: Myiothlypis
- Species: M. conspicillata

Binomial name
- Myiothlypis conspicillata (Salvin & Godman, 1880)

Synonyms
- Basileuterus conspicillatus

= White-lored warbler =

Species of bird

The white-lored warbler (Myiothlypis conspicillata) is a Near Threatened species of bird in the family Parulidae, the New World warblers. It is endemic to the Sierra Nevada de Santa Marta in Colombia.

== Taxonomy and systematics ==
The white-lored warbler was formally described in 1880 with the binomial Basileuterus conspicillatus. By 2007 taxonomic systems had begun to resurrect genus Myiothlypis, which had been erected in 1850, for the white-lored warbler and many other species.

The white-lored warbler is monotypic.

== Description ==
The white-lored warbler is about 14 cm (5.5 in) long and weighs about 14 g (0.49 oz). The sexes have the same plumage. Adults have a mostly gray head with a bright yellow to orange crown stripe with thin blackish borders, blackish lores, a white streak from the lores to join a wide white broken eye-ring ("spectacles"), and a pale gray throat. Their upperparts, wings, and tail are olive green. Their underparts are mostly yellow with a yellow-olive wash on the flanks. They have a brown iris, a dark gray bill, and pale orange legs and feet.

== Distribution and habitat ==
The white-lored warbler is found only in the isolated Sierra Nevada de Santa Marta in northern Colombia. It primarily inhabits the edges and interior of humid premontane and montane forest and is also found in secondary forest and shade coffee plantations. While it ranges in elevation between 450 and 2,100 m (1,500 and 6,900 ft), it is most abundant between 1,000 and 1,500 m (3,300 and 4,900 ft).

== Behavior ==
=== Movement ===
The white-lored warbler is a sedentary year-round resident.

=== Feeding ===
The white-lored warbler's diet has not been studied but is believed to be mostly or entirely invertebrates. Pairs and family groups usually forage in the forest understory below about 2 m (7 ft). The species often joins mixed-species feeding flocks during the time they pass through its territory; with the flocks it may forage as high as the canopy.

=== Breeding ===
The white-lored warbler's breeding season is thought to span from late March to July. The only described nest was a dome nestled among tree roots on the ground. The clutch is thought to be three or four eggs; the eggs are white with chestnut speckles. Nothing else is known about the species' breeding biology.

=== Vocalization ===
The white-lored warbler's song is "a short series of rapidly given very high-pitched notes" that lasts less than five seconds. Its call is "a squeaky triit triit triit, repeated regularly as it forages in the udergrowth".

== Status ==
The IUCN originally in 1988 assessed the white-lored warbler as being of Least Concern but since 1994 as Near Threatened. It has a small range; its estimated population of between 10,300 and 20,600 is believed to be decreasing. "Forests in the Sierra Nevada de Santa Marta are threatened by agricultural expansion, logging and burning. Only 15% of the vegetation is unaltered, as habitat was cleared for coffee and illegal marijuana plantations and subsequently sprayed with herbicide by the government." The species is considered locally common. "Also, the species has shown a certain degree of resilience to habitat transformation due to its presence in shade coffee plantations."
