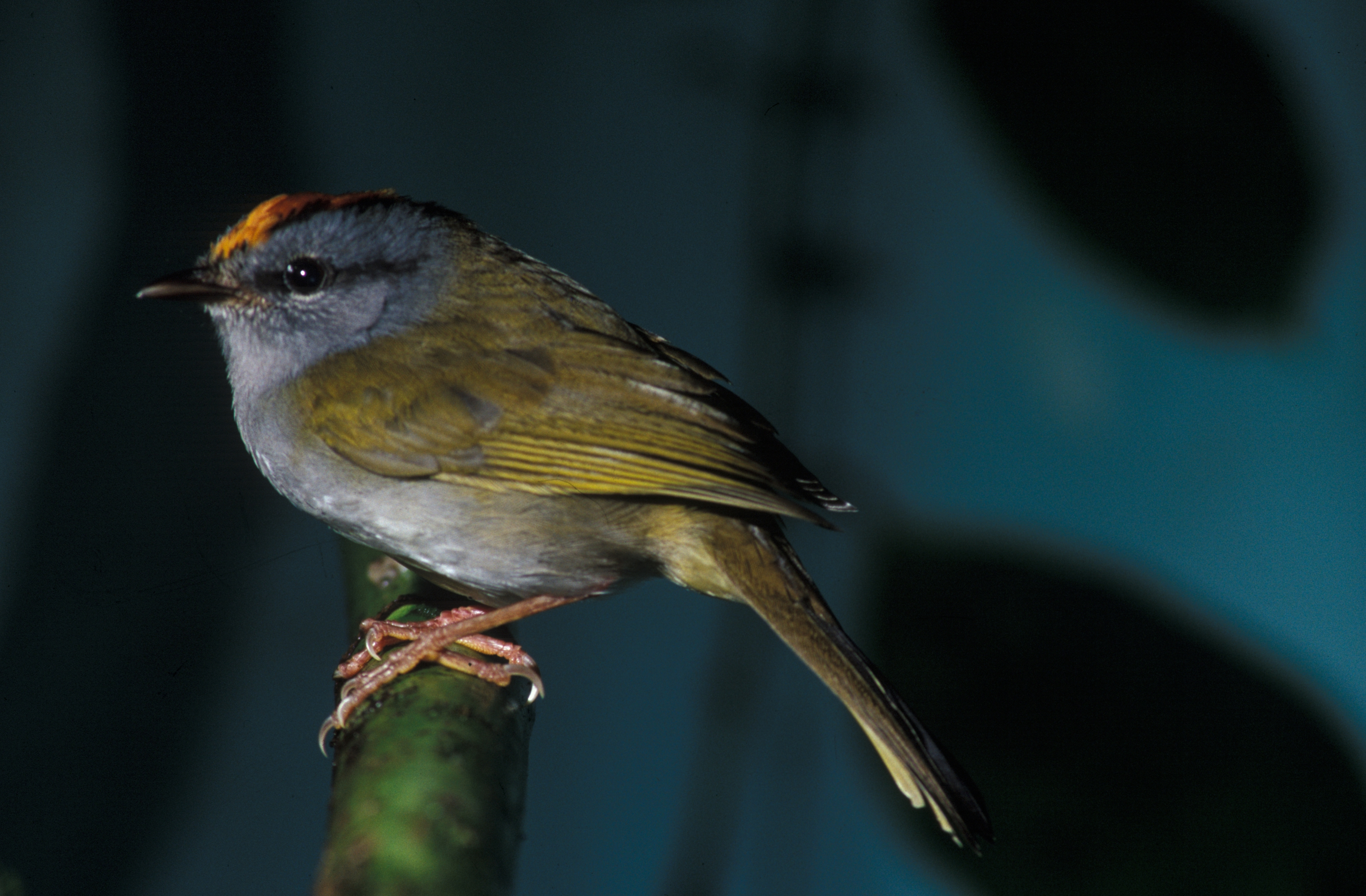

Conservation status
- Least Concern (IUCN 3.1)

Scientific classification
- Kingdom: Animalia
- Phylum: Chordata
- Class: Aves
- Order: Passeriformes
- Family: Parulidae
- Genus: Myiothlypis
- Species: M. coronata

Binomial name
- Myiothlypis coronata (Tschudi, 1844)
- Range of M. coronata

Synonyms
- See text

= Russet-crowned warbler =

Species of bird

The russet-crowned warbler (Myiothlypis coronata) is a species of bird in the family Parulidae, the New World warblers. It is found in Bolivia, Colombia, Ecuador, Peru, and Venezuela.

== Taxonomy and systematics ==
The russet-crowned warbler was formally described in 1844 with the binomial Myiodioctes coronatus. By the 1920s it had been reassigned to genus Basileuterus. By 2007 taxonomic systems had begun to resurrect genus Myiothlypis, which had been erected in 1850, for the russet-crowned warbler and many other species.

The russet-crowned warbler has these eight subspecies:

- M. c. regulus (Todd, 1929)
- M. c. elata (Todd, 1929)
- M. c. orientalis (Chapman, 1924)
- M. c. castaneiceps (Sclater, PL & Salvin, 1877)
- M. c. chapmani (Todd, 1929)
- M. c. inaequalis (Zimmer, JT, 1949)
- M. c. coronata (Tschudi, 1844)
- M. c. notia (Todd, 1929)

== Description ==
The russet-crowned warbler is about 14 cm (5.5 in) long and weighs 13.5 to 19.5 g (0.48 to 0.69 oz). The sexes have the same plumage. Adults of the nominate subspecies M. c. coronata have a mostly gray head with an orange-rufous crown stripe with black borders, a long thin black stripe through the eye, and a grayish white throat. Their upperparts, wings, and tail are olive-green with a slight bronze tinge on the upperparts. Their underparts are yellow. Juveniles have an olive-brown head, upperparts, and breast. Their median and greater wing coverts have cinnamon tips that show as two faint wing bars. Their belly is pale buffy yellow and their flanks and undertail coverts olive-buff.

The other subspecies of the russet-crowned warbler differ from the nominate and each other thus:

- M. c. regulus: slightly more orange crown stripe than nominate with similar upperparts
- M. c. elata: slightly more orange crown stripe, no bronze tinge on upperparts, and gray throat merges into olive-yellow breast
- M. c. orientalis greenish-gray olive upperparts and pale grayish white throat and breast becoming pale yellowish on the belly and below
- M. c. castaneiceps: grayish olive upperparts and grayish white underparts
- M. c. chapmani: pale bronze-olive upperparts and grayish white underparts
- M. c. inaequalis: slightly smaller than nominate with deeper olive-green upperparts with no bronze tinge
- M. c. notia: smaller than nominate with darker upperparts with no bronze and deeper yellow underparts

All subspecies have a brown iris, a black bill, and yellow-brown legs and feet.

== Distribution and habitat ==
The subspecies of the russet-crowned warbler are found thus:

- M. c. regulus: Venezuelan Andes from Trujillo south through Mérida and Táchira into Colombia, where present in all three Andean ranges south to Cauca and Huila departments
- M. c. elata: from southwestern Colombia's Nariño Department south on the western Andean slope to Guayas Province in Ecuador
- M. c. orientalis: eastern Andean slope through most of Ecuador
- M. c. castaneiceps: from Azuay, El Oro, and Loja provinces in southwestern Ecuador south into northwestern Peru's Tumbes and Piura departments
- M. c. chapmani: eastern Andean slope in northwestern Peru's Department of Cajamarca
- M. c. inaequalis: eastern Andean slope in northern Peru's Amazonas and San Martín departments
- M. c. coronata: eastern Andean slope from central Peru's Department of Pasco south into western Bolivia's La Paz Department
- M. c. notia: eastern Andean slope in central Bolivia's Cochabamba Department

The russet-crowned warbler inhabits the edges and interior of humid woodlands, montane forest, and cloudforest, and also mature secondary forest with a dense understory. In elevation it ranges between 1,800 and 2,800 m (5,900 and 9,200 ft) in Venezuela, between 1,400 and 3,200 m (4,600 and 10,500 ft) in Colombia, and mostly between 1,500 and 3,000 m (4,900 and 9,800 ft) in Ecuador. In Peru it is mostly between 1,500 and 2,900 m (4,900 and 9,500 ft) but locally occurs as low as 1,100 m (3,600 ft) and as high as 3,150 m (10,300 ft).

== Behavior ==
=== Movement ===
The russet-crowned warbler is a sedentary year-round resident.

=== Feeding ===
The russet-crowned warbler's diet has not been studied though it is believed to feed primarily on invertebrates. It forages by gleaning from vegetation, mostly between about 1 and 6 m (3 and 20 ft) above the ground. Pairs and family groups often join mixed-species feeding flocks.

=== Breeding ===
The russet-crowned warbler's breeding season has not been fully defined. Evidence suggests it spans at least September to November in Ecuador and February to October in Colombia. The species' nest is a domed cup with a side entrance. It is made from twigs, leaves, other plant material, and mosses with a lining of thin grass and tree fern scales. It is typically placed on the ground or slightly above it. The clutch is two eggs. The incubation period, time to fledging, and details of parental care are not known.

=== Vocalization ===
The russet-crowned warbler's song in Venezuela is described as "a few sputtery notes followed by smoothly rising glissando, teet, tut't't'u'u'treeeeeeEE or tzinkle tzinkle tzinkle zuuurrreeeeEE". For all subspecies except M. c. notius in Peru it is described as "a loud, strong, melancholy series of slightly burry, ringing whistles that normally rise at the end". There its call is "deep growled grr or djrt notes" often given in a fast series. M. c. notius sings "a thinner, higher series of soft notes ending in a long ringing note: tee-lee-teeZJEEEE" and its call is "a higher, thinner djit".

== Status ==
The IUCN has assessed the russet-crowned warbler as being of Least Concern. It has a very large range; its population size is not known and is believed to be decreasing. No immediate threats have been identified. It is considered fairly common in Venezuela, common in Colombia, "widespread" in Ecuador, and "common and widespread" in Peru.
