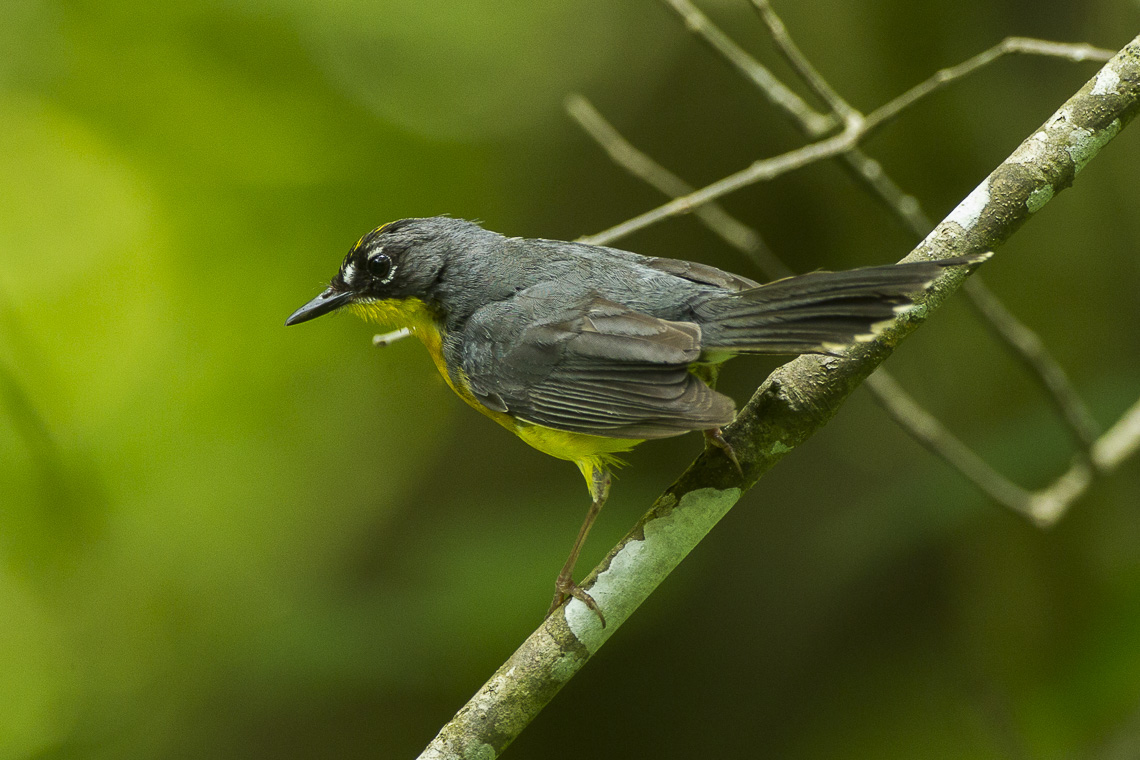

Conservation status
- Least Concern (IUCN 3.1)

Scientific classification
- Kingdom: Animalia
- Phylum: Chordata
- Class: Aves
- Order: Passeriformes
- Family: Parulidae
- Genus: Euthlypis; Cabanis, 1851
- Species: E. lachrymosa

Binomial name
- Euthlypis lachrymosa (Bonaparte, 1850)
- Breeding range Breeding and wintering range

Synonyms
- See text

= Fan-tailed warbler =

Species of bird

The fan-tailed warbler (Euthlypis lachrymosa) is a species of bird in the family Parulidae, the New World warblers. It is the only species placed in the genus Euthlypis. It is found from Mexico to Nicaragua. It has also been recorded as a vagrant in the U. S. states of Arizona, New Mexico, and Texas. Its "habit of constant tail-fanning and tail-swinging [is] distinctive".

== Taxonomy and systematics ==
The fan-tailed warbler was formally described in 1850 by the French naturalist Charles Lucien Bonaparte based on a specimen that had been collected in 1828 by the German explorer Ferdinand Deppe in Laguna Huetulacan in the Mexican state of Veracruz. Bonaparte coined the binomial name Basileuterus lachrymosa. In 1851 the German ornithologist Jean Cabanis introduced the genus Euthlypis and designated the type species as Euthlypis lachrymosa Cabanis. This is a junior synonym of Bonaparte's Basileuterus lachrymosa. The genus name Euthlypis combines the Ancient Greek ευ/eu meaning "fine" or "good" with θλυπις/thlupis, the name of unknown small bird mentioned by Greek authors. The specific epithet lachrymosa is Latin meaning "tearful", "mournful", "weeping" or "piteous". The fan-tailed warbler has sometimes been placed in the genus Basileuterus. It is now placed in the monotypic genus Euthlypis based on a genomic DNA study published in 2025 that recovered Euthlypis as sister to a large clade comprising the genera Basileuterus + Cardellina + Myioborus. The species is monotypic: no subspecies are recognised.

== Description ==
The fan-tailed warbler is about 15 cm (5.9 in) long and weighs 10 to 21 g (0.35 to 0.74 oz). The sexes have the same plumage. Adults have a black forecrown, a narrow yellow crown patch, a white spot on the lores, and thin white crescents above and below the eye on an otherwise dark gray face. Their upperparts and wings are dark gray with a faint olive wash on the mantle. Their tail is long, graduated, and dark gray with white feather tips. Their throat, breast, and belly are rich yellow, their flanks are washed with tawny-yellow, and their undertail coverts are white. Birds in the southern part of their range have more black on their face, are darker gray above, and have a richer tawny wash than more northerly birds, though the differences are clinal. They have a dark iris, a black bill, and dusky pinkish legs and feet. Juveniles have an ash-gray head and upperparts. Their wings' greater and median coverts have buff tips that show as two thin wing bars. Their throat, breast, and flanks are brownish gray and their belly and undertail coverts pale buffy olive. They have a paler bill and legs than adults.

== Distribution and habitat ==
The fan-tailed warbler is found "on the Pacific slope of Mexico from southern Sonora south to Guatemala, El Salvador, and Honduras (locally also in interior valleys) to central Nicaragua and on the Gulf slope of Mexico from eastern San Luis Potosí and southern Tamaulipas to Veracruz and north-central Oaxaca." South of Mexico is it found intermittently. It has also been recorded as a vagrant in the U. S. states of Arizona, New Mexico, and Texas.

The fan-tailed warbler inhabits semi-deciduous and evergreen forest with an intact understory in the foothills and lower mountain slopes. It favors "rugged, rocky areas such as ravines and forest-covered lava flows". Overall it ranges in elevation from 50 to 1,800 m (200 to 5,900 ft). In El Salvador, Guatemala, and Honduras it ranges from 250 to 1,850 m (800 to 6,100 ft).

== Behavior ==
=== Movement ===
The fan-tailed warbler is generally considered to be a year-round resident, though some part of the populations in Sonora and Chihuahua may withdraw south in winter.

=== Feeding ===
The fan-tailed warbler feeds on insects and other invertebrates. It takes most prey on the ground and in low vegetation by gleaning from leaves and rocks. It regularly attends army ant swarms to capture prey fleeing from the ants; up to 12 individuals have been seen doing so. It has also been observed several times following nine-banded armadillos (Dasypus novemcinctus), apparently for the same reason. In the non-breeding season individual birds and pairs may join mixed-species feeding flocks.

=== Breeding ===
The fan-tailed warbler's breeding season has not been defined. Its nest is an open cup made from dry leaves, grass, and pine needles. It is usually well-hidden on the ground, and often under leaf litter. Nothing else is known about the species' breeding biology.

=== Vocalization ===
One description of the fan-tailed warbler's song is "a series of clear, downslurred whistles, rising sharply on penultimate note...as wee wee wee wee wee wee-cher". It also sings "a more variable series on more even pitch and with slow terminal flourish". Its calls are "a thin, high-pitched tseeng or schree, also a shorter si". Another description and transcription of the song is "a pleasant sharply whistled see'sah'see'sah'see'seew'seew" whose last note drops in pitch. This author describes its call as "a thin, high-pitched seeeuh".

== Status ==
The IUCN has assessed the fan-tailed warbler as being of Least Concern. It has a very large range; its estimated population of at least 50,000 mature individuals is believed to be decreasing. No immediate threats have been identified. It is considered generally fairly common but local in some areas.
