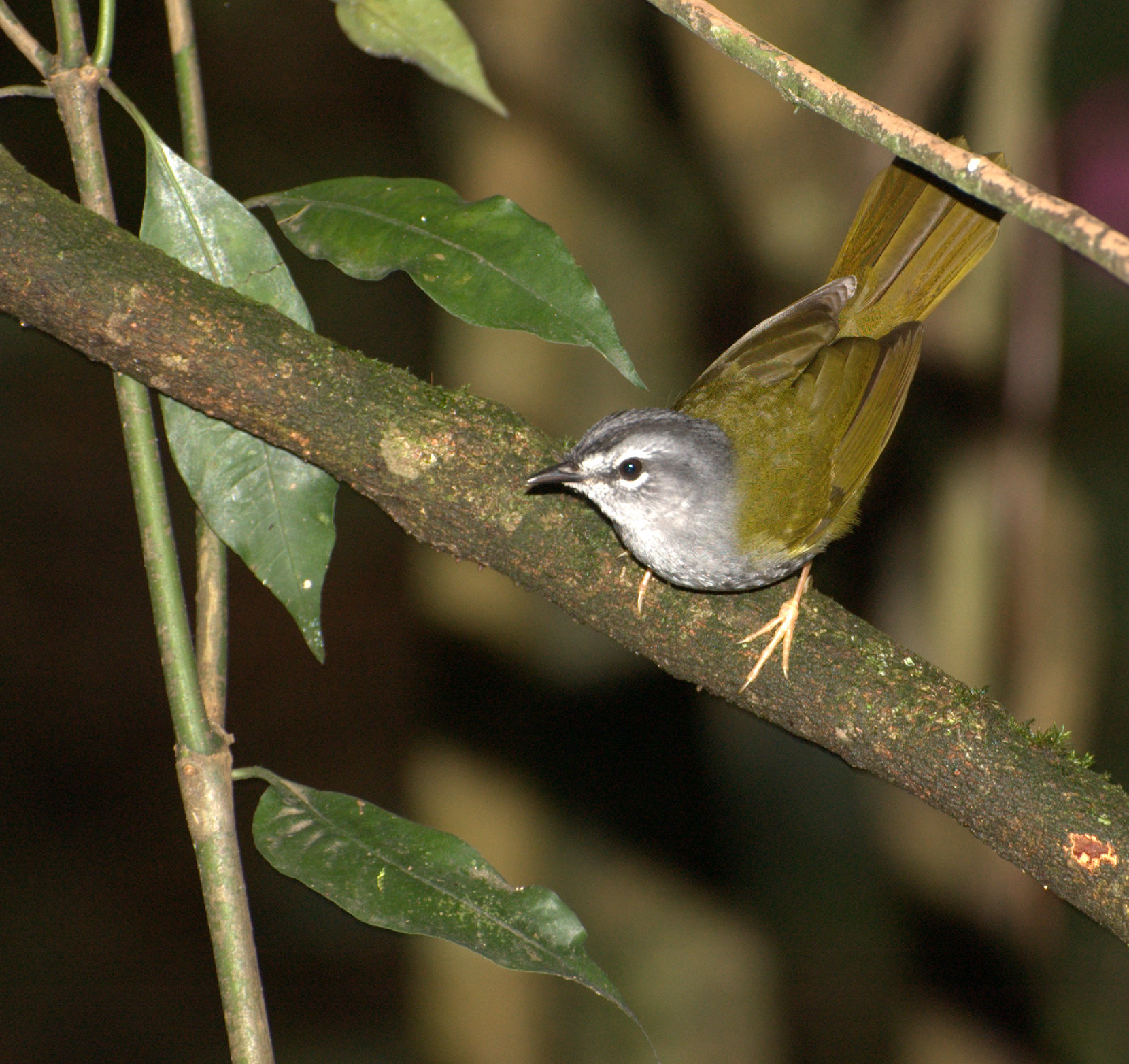

Conservation status
- Least Concern (IUCN 3.1)

Scientific classification
- Kingdom: Animalia
- Phylum: Chordata
- Class: Aves
- Order: Passeriformes
- Family: Parulidae
- Genus: Myiothlypis
- Species: M. leucoblephara

Binomial name
- Myiothlypis leucoblephara (Vieillot, 1817)

Synonyms
- See text

= White-rimmed warbler =

White-browed warbler

Species of bird

The white-rimmed warbler or white-browed warbler (Myiothlypis leucoblephara) is a species of bird in the family Parulidae, the New World warblers. It is found in Argentina, Brazil, Paraguay, and Uruguay.

== Taxonomy and systematics ==
The white-rimmed warbler was formally described in 1817 with the binomial Sylvia leucoblephara. For a time it and a few other species were placed in genus Phaeothlypis and also in Basileuterus. By 2012 the IOC had assigned it to Myiothlypis. BirdLife International's Handbook of the Birds of the World (HBW) did so in 2016.

The white-rimmed warbler's further taxonomy is unsettled. The IOC, AviList, and HBW assign it two subspecies, the nominate M. l. leucoblephara (Vieillot, 1817) and M. l. lemurum (Olson, 1975). As of late 2025 the Clements taxonomy does not recognize M. l. lemurum, treating M. leucoblephara as monotypic.

This article follows the majority two-subspecies model.

== Description ==
The white-rimmed warbler is about 14.5 cm (5.7 in) long and weighs 14 to 21 g (0.49 to 0.74 oz). The sexes have the same plumage. Adults of the nominate subspecies have a mostly gray head with a blackish gray stripe in the middle of the crown, a white stripe above the lores, a thin black line through the eye, white crescents above and below the eye, and whitish cheeks. Their upperparts, wings, and tail are olive-green. Their throat and underparts are mostly whitish with a gray wash on the sides of the breast, an olive wash on the upper flanks, and pale olivaceous-yellow undertail coverts. Subspecies M. l. lemurum has darker upperparts than the nominate, with mostly medium gray underparts with whitish down the middle and gray undertail coverts that have pale yellow edges. Both subspecies have a dark iris, a blackish bill, and orange-pink legs and feet.

== Distribution and habitat ==
The nominate subspecies of the white-rimmed warbler is the more northerly of the two and has by far the larger range. It is found in southern Brazil south of a line that roughly goes across the middle of Mato Grosso do Sul, far northern São Paulo state, and the midline of Minas Gerais to the Atlantic in Rio de Janeiro state. Its range continues south through eastern Paraguay, into northeastern Argentina south through most of Entre Ríos Province, and into Uruguay. At the time of its description in 1975, subspecies M. l. lemurum was known only from the Cerro de las Ánimas in far southern Uruguay. The dividing line between the two subspecies remains unresolved.

The white-rimmed warbler primarily inhabits gallery forest and mature secondary forest that has a dense understory. It often occurs near water but is not as dependent on it as some other members of its genus. In elevation it ranges from sea level to 1,600 m (5,200 ft).

== Behavior ==
=== Movement ===
The white-rimmed warbler is a sedentary year-round resident.

=== Feeding ===
The white-rimmed warbler's diet has not been studied but is assumed to be entirely or nearly entirely invertebrates with very small amounts of plant material. It takes prey by gleaning on or near the ground. It forages mostly in dense undergrowth but will do so in the open. It seldom joins mixed-species feeding flocks.

=== Breeding ===
The white-rimmed warbler's breeding season has not been defined but pairs are known to remain on their territory year-round. Its nest is usually a dome with a side entrance. The clutch is three to four eggs. Nothing else is known about the species' breeding biology.

=== Vocalization ===
The white-rimmed warbler's song is a "fairly long series of fee notes, which start at extr. high level and then descend very steeply to 5 notes lower. Its call is "a sharp penetrating pseeyk".

== Status ==
The IUCN has assessed the white-rimmed warbler as being of Least Concern. It has a large range; its population size is not known and is believed to be decreasing. No immediate threats have been identified. It is considered "common to frequent" in Brazil and common south of there.
