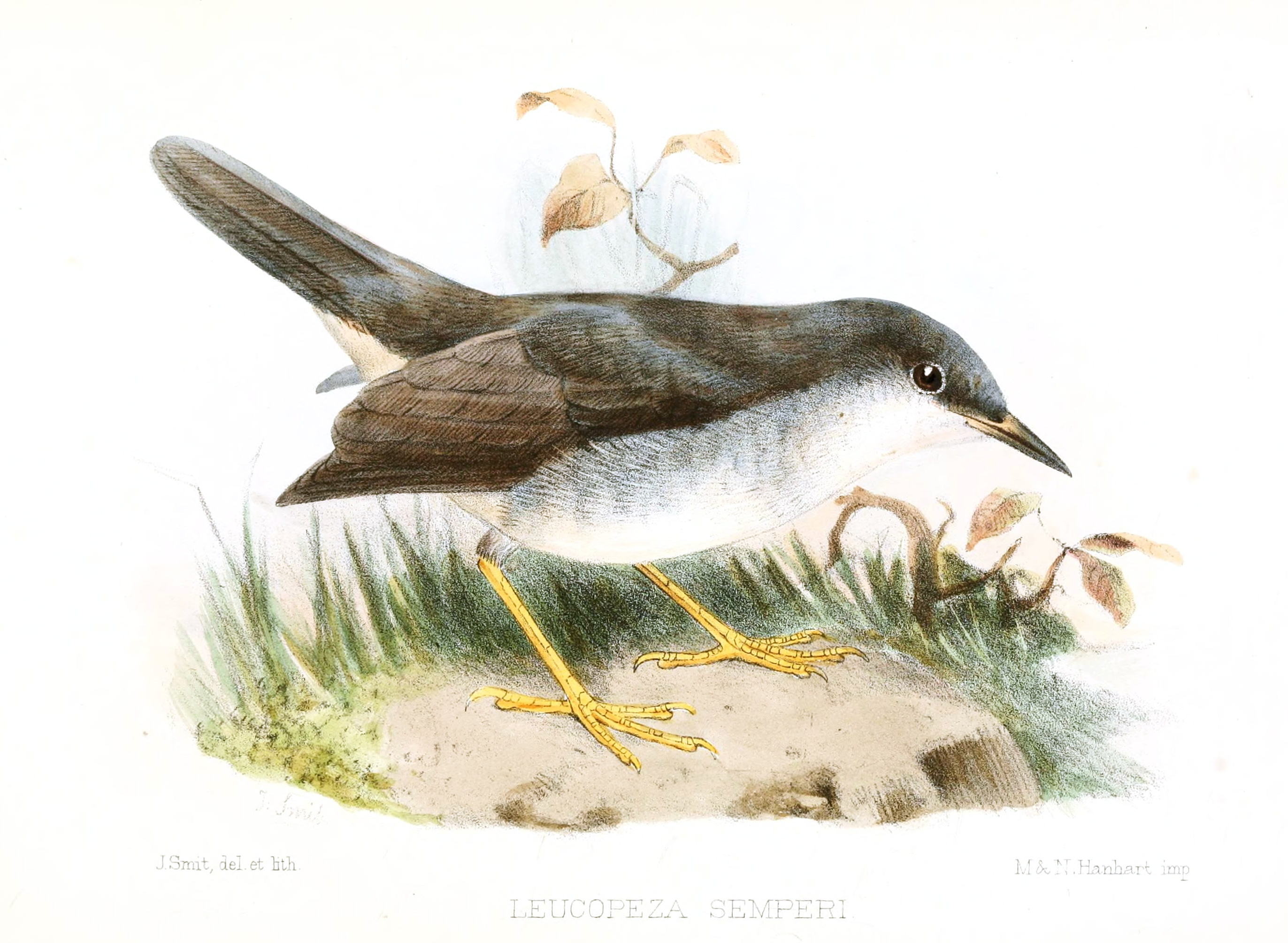
- Illustration by Joseph Smit

Conservation status
- Critically Endangered (IUCN 3.1)

Scientific classification
- Kingdom: Animalia
- Phylum: Chordata
- Class: Aves
- Order: Passeriformes
- Family: Parulidae
- Genus: Leucopeza; Sclater, PL, 1876
- Species: L. semperi

Binomial name
- Leucopeza semperi Sclater, PL, 1876

= Semper's warbler =

Species of bird

Semper's warbler (Leucopeza semperi), local name pied-blanc, is a possibly extinct passerine bird of the New World warbler family, Parulidae. It is endemic to Saint Lucia, in the Lesser Antilles. It is the only species in the genus Leucopeza.

== Taxonomy ==
This bird was first described in 1876 by English zoologist Philip Lutley Sclater based on a specimen forwarded to him by the Reverend John E. Semper, an amateur ornithologist who lived in St. Lucia. Semper's warbler is the type species of the monotypic genus Leucopeza, which Sclater introduced at the time of description.

The common name and Latin binomial name commemorate Rev. Semper. The genus name, Leucopeza, combines the Ancient Greek leukos meaning "white" and peza meaning "foot".

== Description ==
Semper's warbler is about 14.5 centimetres (5.7 inches) in length. It has a dark gray head with a pale superciliary, dark gray upperparts, a grayish-white belly, and brown wings and tail, with a grayish olive-brown wash on its flanks. Its dark gray bill is long and pointed. First-year birds are brownish-gray above, with pale buffish brown underparts and a whiter throat. The long legs are pale white to yellow in coloration. Juveniles remain undescribed.

The song remains undescribed. The only documented calls consist of tuck-tick-tick-tuck noises, as well as chattering sounds made when an individual is alarmed.

== Distribution and habitat ==
Semper's warbler is endemic to Saint Lucia, living in the undisturbed undergrowth of lower montane rainforests and elfin woodlands. Most records of the species come from the Barre de l'Isle ridge, between Piton Flore and Piton Canaries.

== Ecology and behavior ==
There is next to no information about the ecology of the Semper's warbler. Most if not all of its foraging activity took place in forest understory, generally close to the ground. It may nest on or near the ground.

== Status ==
The Semper's warbler was locally common in the 19th century, but very few reports exist from the 20th century onwards. The introduction of mongooses in St. Lucia in 1884 in an attempt to control populations of fer-de-lance is a likely cause for decline, especially if it is a ground-nesting bird, as is habitat destruction and an increase in human disturbances of habitat following construction of agricultural feeder roads and land use conversion for agriculture.

According to West Indian ornithologist James Bond, it was last collected on the summit of Piton Flores in 1934. Another report was from March 1947, where it was sighted between Piton Lacombe and Piton Canaries. The last confirmed sighting was in 1961, with unconfirmed sightings in 1965, 1989, 1995, and 2003. Some unexplored suitable habitat - montane or elfin forests - for the Semper's warbler does remain on St. Lucia, so it is possible that there is a small remaining population on the island.
