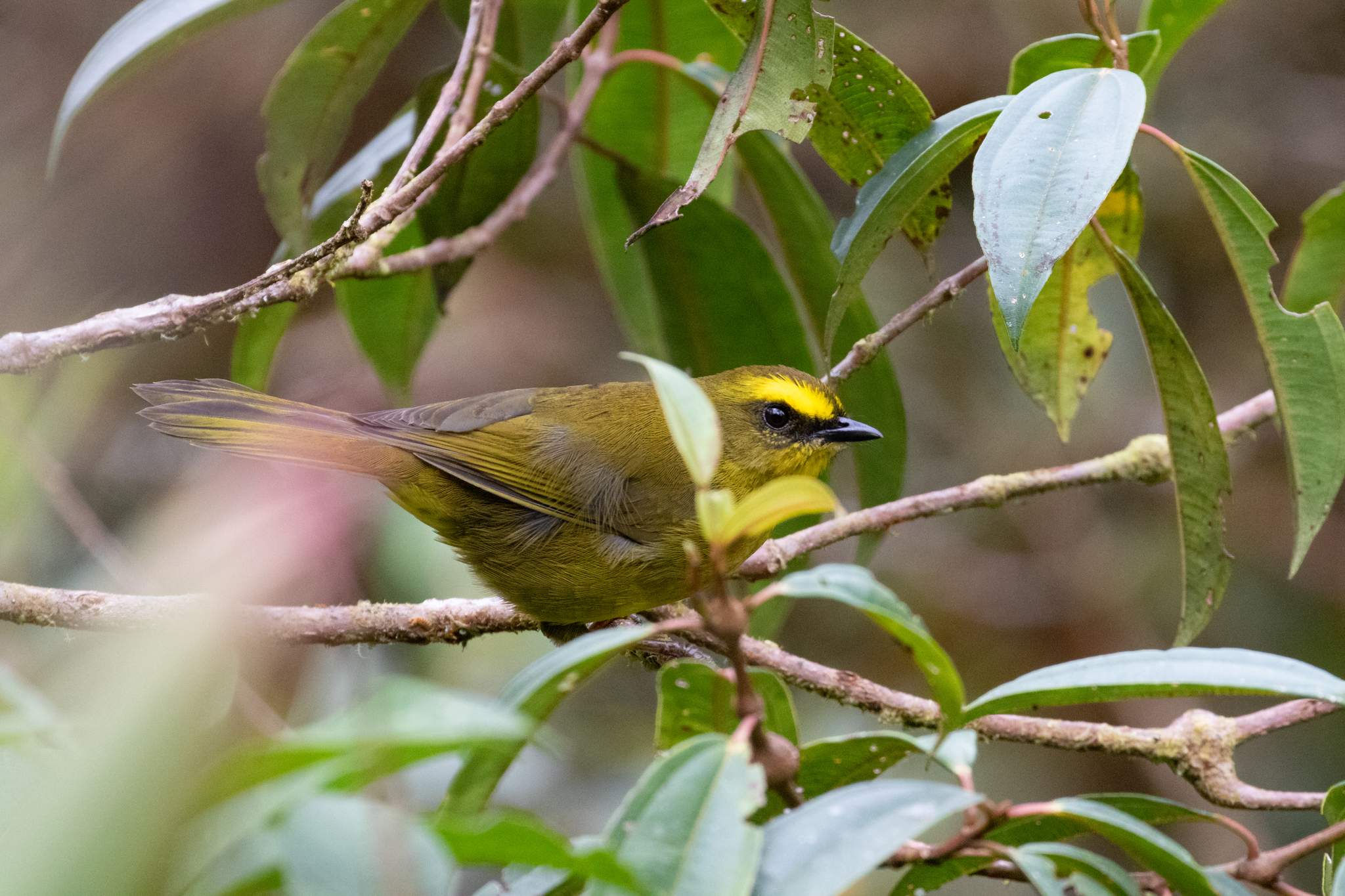

Conservation status
- Least Concern (IUCN 3.1)

Scientific classification
- Kingdom: Animalia
- Phylum: Chordata
- Class: Aves
- Order: Passeriformes
- Family: Parulidae
- Genus: Myiothlypis
- Species: M. luteoviridis

Binomial name
- Myiothlypis luteoviridis (Bonaparte, 1845)

Synonyms
- See text

Audio

= Citrine warbler =

Species of bird

The citrine warbler (Myiothlypis luteoviridis) is a species of bird in the family Parulidae, the New World warblers. It is found in Bolivia, Colombia, Ecuador, Peru, and Venezuela. The species' English name derives from the Latin citrus which means "yellow".

== Taxonomy and systematics ==
The citrine warbler was formally described in 1845 as Trichas luteoviridis. At some point it was reassigned to genus Basileuterus. By 2012 the IOC had reassigned it to its present genus Myiothlypis. BirdLife International's Handbook of the Birds of the World (HBW) did so in 2016.

The citrine warbler's further taxonomy is unsettled. The IOC, the Clements taxonomy, and AviList assign it these five subspecies:

- Myiothlypis luteoviridis luteoviridis (Bonaparte, 1845)
- Myiothlypis luteoviridis quindiana (Meyer de Schauensee, 1946)
- Myiothlypis luteoviridis richardsoni (Chapman, 1912)
- Myiothlypis luteoviridis striaticeps Cabanis, 1873
- Myiothlypis luteoviridis euophrys (Sclater, PL & Salvin, 1876)

However, in 2016 HBW split M. l. striaticeps as the species "Peruvian citrine warbler" and M. l. euophrys as the "Bolivian citrine warbler". It renamed the reduced M. luteoviridis the "northern citrine warbler". As of late 2025 HBW retained these three species. Clements recognizes some distinctions within the species, somewhat mirroring HBW by calling M. l. striaticeps the "citrine warbler (Peruvian)", M. l. euophrys the "citrine warbler (Bolivian)", and grouping the other three as the "citrine warbler (northern). AviList notes, "Geographic patterns in plumage and vocalizations suggest the presence of three groups, but detailed genetic and bioacoustic studies are needed before making any splits."

This article follows the majority five-subspecies model.

== Description ==
The citrine warbler is 13 to 14 cm (5.1 to 5.5 in) long and weighs 12 to 20 g (0.42 to 0.71 oz). The sexes have the same plumage. Adults of the nominate subspecies M. l. luteoviridis have an olive green crown, a short yellow supercilium, a short blackish line through the eye, a faint yellowish to whitish crescent below the eye, and olive green ear coverts with yellow flecks. Their nape and upperparts are olive green. Their throat and underparts are mostly yellow with an olive wash on the sides of the breast and flanks. Juveniles are mostly dark olive brown with a faint supercilium and pale ochre-yellow belly. Adults of all subspecies have a dark brown, gray, or black iris, a black bill, and legs and feet of highly variable color.

The other subspecies of the citrine warbler differ from the nominate and each other thus:

- Myiothlypis luteoviridis richardsoni: much duller than nominate with whitish supercilium and throat, paler and grayer upperparts, and pale buffy-yellow underparts
- Myiothlypis luteoviridis quindiana: intermediate between nominate and richardsoni
- Myiothlypis luteoviridis striaticeps: slightly larger than nominate; some black along lower edge of crown, longer and brighter supercilium, and deeper yellow breast
- Myiothlypis luteoviridis euophrys: wide black stripe under the crown with longer and wider supercilium, larger and blacker eye stripe, and deeper yellow breast

== Distribution and habitat ==
The citrine warbler has a disjunct distribution; most subspecies' ranges do not adjoin another. The subspecies are found thus:

- Myiothlypis luteoviridis luteoviridis from central Mérida state in western Venezuela south along Colombia's Eastern Andes and the eastern Andean slope of Ecuador to the Marañón River valley in northern Peru's Cajamarca Department
- Myiothlypis luteoviridis quindiana: Colombia's Central Andes
- Myiothlypis luteoviridis richardsoni: Pacific slope of Colombia's Western Andes
- Myiothlypis luteoviridis striaticeps: eastern Andean slope in Peru from Marañón valley in Amazonas to the Marcapata River valley in Cuzco
- Myiothlypis luteoviridis euophrys: eastern Andean slope from Peru's Marcapata valley into Bolivia to western Santa Cruz Department

The citrine warbler inhabits a variety of forested landscapes including the interior and shrubby borders of humid montane forest, cloudforest, and elfin forest as well as scrub at tree line. In elevation it ranges between 2,400 and 3,000 m (7,900 and 9,800 ft) in Venezuela, between 2,200 and 3,400 m (7,200 and 11,200 ft) in Colombia, mostly between 2,500 and 3,200 m (8,200 and 10,500 ft) in Ecuador, and between 2,500 and 3,700 m (8,200 and 12,100 ft) but locally down to 2,100 m (6,900 ft) in Peru.

== Behavior ==
=== Movement ===
The citrine warbler is a sedentary year-round resident.

=== Feeding ===
The citrine warbler's diet has not been studied but is believed to be entirely or almost entirely invertebrates. It takes most prey by gleaning in the forest's lower to middle levels. In the breeding season if forages in pairs or small groups that in the non-breeding season often join mixed-species feeding flocks.

=== Breeding ===
The citrine warbler's breeding seasons vary geographically but have not been fully defined. There is breeding evidence in August through October in Colombia, in September to November in Peru, and in January in Bolivia. Its nest has not been described. One that was photographed was a cup that contained two eggs that were white with dark markings. Nothing else is known about the species' breeding biology.

=== Vocalization ===
The citrine warbler's song varies among the subspecies. That of M. l. luteoviridis in Venezuela is described as "typically short, fast, chattery trills followed by 2 or more distinct and emphatic notes at [the] end, e.g. ch'ch'chu'u' chu-cheet! varied to te'e'e'eee te teet!. It is described differently in Ecuador as "a long series of rapidly uttered high-pitched notes that rise and fall in pitch in almost random fashion. sometimes accelerating into a terminal trill". The song of M. l. striaticeps is " a long (5-12 sec) series of rich, jerky, ringing warbles, starting softly and building until quite loud before ending abruptly". That of M. l. euophrys is "more an accelerating series of high, twittery chips that rises and falls, ending in a rapid high, metallic warble". Pairs often sing in duet.

== Status ==
The IUCN follows HBW taxonomy and so has separately evaluated the "northern", "Peruvian", and "Bolivian" citrine warblers. All three are assessed as being of Least Concern. Their populations' sizes are not known and all are believed to be decreasing. No immediate threats to any have been identified. In Venezuela the species is most numerous in southern Táchira. It is fairly common in Colombia and varies from uncommon to common in Ecuador. In Peru it is the "most common and widespread high elevation Basileuterus [Myiothlypis] (but uncommon north and west of [the] Marañón valley".
