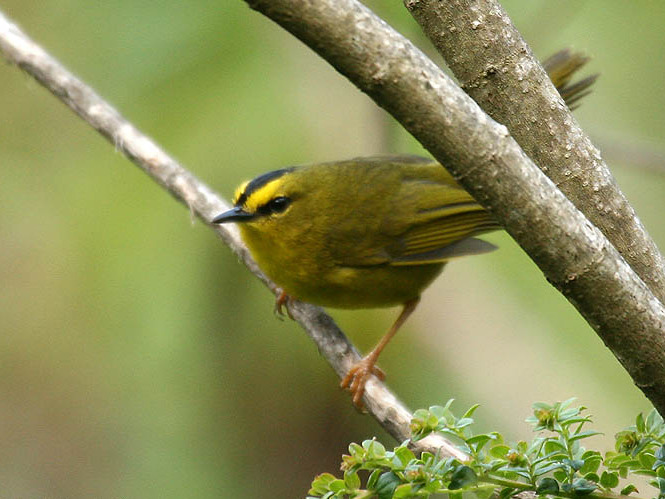
- Black-crested warbler (Myiothlypis nigrocristata)

Scientific classification
- Kingdom: Animalia
- Phylum: Chordata
- Class: Aves
- Order: Passeriformes
- Family: Parulidae
- Genus: Myiothlypis; Cabanis, 1851

Type species
- Trichas nigrocristatus Lafresnaye, 1840

Species
- Many, see text

= Myiothlypis =

Genus of birds

Myiothlypis is a genus of New World warblers, best represented in Central and South America. This is one of only two warbler genera that are well represented in the latter continent. All of these species were formerly placed in the genus Basileuterus.

== Taxonomy ==
The genus Myiothlypis was introduced in 1851 by the German ornithologist Jean Cabanis to accommodate a single species, Trichas nigrocristatus, the black-crested warbler, that had been described in 1840 by Frédéric de Lafresnaye. The genus name combines the Ancient Greek muia meaning "fly" with thlupis, an unidentified small bird.

A molecular phylogenetic study of the New World warbler family Parulidae published in 2010 found that the species formed several major clades that did not align with the traditional genera. This led to a major reorganization of the species within the family to create monophyletic genera. As part of this rearrangement the genus Myiothlypis was resurrected to contain a clade that now includes 18 species.

== Species ==
The genus contains the following 18 species:

Image	Common name	Scientific name
	Citrine warbler	Myiothlypis luteoviridis
	Santa Marta warbler	Myiothlypis basilica
	White-striped warbler	Myiothlypis leucophrys
	Flavescent warbler	Myiothlypis flaveola
	White-rimmed warbler	Myiothlypis leucoblephara
	Pale-legged warbler	Myiothlypis signata
	Black-crested warbler	Myiothlypis nigrocristata
	Buff-rumped warbler	Myiothlypis fulvicauda
	Riverbank warbler	Myiothlypis rivularis
	Two-banded warbler	Myiothlypis bivittata
	Roraiman warbler	Myiothlypis roraimae
	Cuzco warbler	Myiothlypis chrysogaster
	Choco warbler	Myiothlypis chlorophrys
	White-lored warbler	Myiothlypis conspicillata
	Grey-throated warbler	Myiothlypis cinereicollis
	Grey-and-gold warbler	Myiothlypis fraseri
	Russet-crowned warbler	Myiothlypis coronata
	Grey-headed warbler	Myiothlypis griseiceps
