= Paria whitestart =

Conservation status
- Endangered (IUCN 3.1)

Scientific classification
- Kingdom: Animalia
- Phylum: Chordata
- Class: Aves
- Order: Passeriformes
- Family: Parulidae
- Genus: Myioborus
- Species: M. pariae

Binomial name
- Myioborus pariae Phelps & Phelps, 1949

Synonyms
- Myioborus brunniceps pariae

Species of bird

The Paria whitestart (Myioborus pariae), also known as the Paria redstart, yellow-faced whitestart or yellow-faced redstart, is a passerine bird of the New World warbler family, Parulidae. It is endemic to the Paria Peninsula in Venezuela, where it occurs primarily on the edges and in clearings of humid cloud forests. It is threatened by on-going habitat loss within its tiny range, which is near-entirely contained within the Península de Paria National Park.

== Taxonomy ==
The Paria whitestart was first described by William H. Phelps & William H. Phelps, Jr. in 1949, based on a specimen collected by Ramón Urbano during expeditions to Cerro Azul and Cerro Humo. The species name, pariae, refers to the species' endemic range of the Paria Peninsula.

The understanding of the Paria whitestart's relationship to other Myioborus species is still developing. It was initially described as a subspecies of the brown-capped whitestart (Myioborus brunniceps), but Phelps later suggested elevating it to a species due to the distinctive appearance of its head and tailfeathers. It is at present accepted as its own species. The Paria whitestart has been considered to be a part of the M. brunniceps superspecies complex, which also includes the brown-capped whitestart Myioborus brunniceps, the Tepui whitestart Myioborus castaneocapillus, the white-faced whitestart Myioborus albifacies, and the Guaiquinima whitestart Myioborus cardonai. More recent molecular phylogenetic analysis of the species relationships within Myioborus has affirmed its status as a species.

== Description ==
The Paria whitestart is a small warbler, being about 13 centimeters (5.11 inches) in length. It has a gray head with a rufous crown and a bright yellow eyering & supraloral stripe. The upperparts are gray, with bright yellow throat and underparts, and the tail is black with white undertail coverts. The bill is black, the iris is brown, and the feet and legs are a blackish yellow. Adults of both sex are similar in plumage - it has been suggested, but not yet confirmed, that males could generally have brighter yellow on the face and a purer gray on the back.

Its song is described variably as a wheetsa-wheetsa-wheetsa-wesee or a tesza-sweet-see-zéé-zéét, tending to rise in volume and become more insistent towards the end, although it does vary in order and pitch of notes. The call is a high, liquid tship note lasting less than one second.

Nothing is published about the Paria whitestart's reproduction. Phelps & Phelps's description from 1949 notes that the female specimens which were collected in May had laying ovaries.

== Distribution and habitat ==
The Paria whitestart is endemic to the Paria Peninsula in northeastern Sucre, Venezuela. Its range is estimated to be about 270 km^{2} (167 mi^{2}), spanning the humid montane forests and cloud forests between 800-1,150 meters (2,624-2,772 feet) on the slopes of Cerros Humo, Azul, and El Ovido, and potentially Cerro Patao. It is noted to prefer forest edges and clearings, being absent from denser forest interiors, and has been observed below forest canopy at the edges of nearby coffee plantations. It is locally common on Cerro Humo, but rare on Cerros Azul and El Ovido, and rare if present on Cerro Patao. There are assumed to be several small subpopulations represented by records from the different regions of the peninsula, although there is also the possibility of seasonal dispersals or movements.

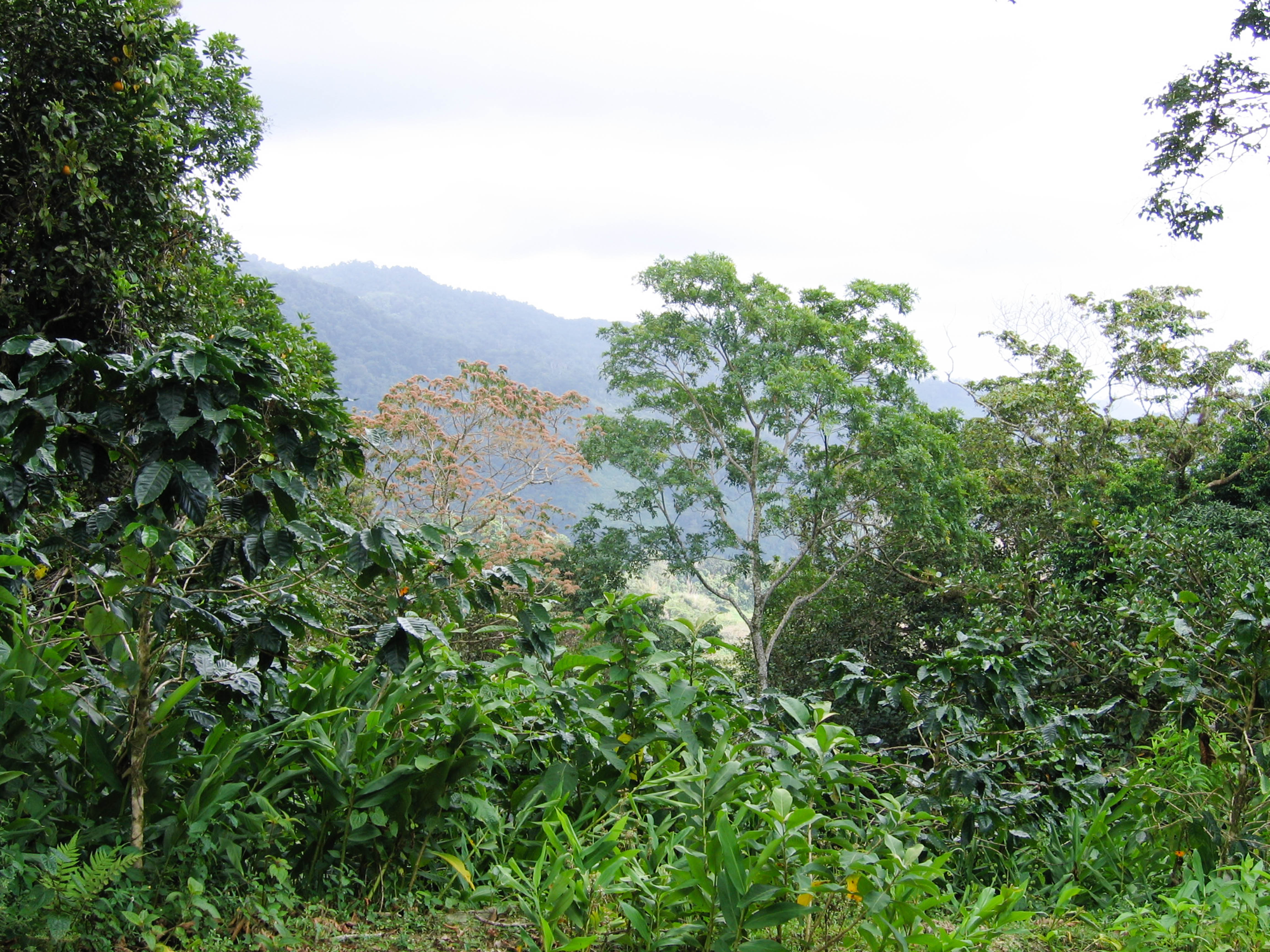
Photograph taken on Cerro Humo in February 2005, showing the kind of clearing or forest edge habitat that the Paria whitestart may frequent.

== Ecology and behavior ==
Very little published information exists on the ecology of the Paria whitestart. It is diurnal, and appears to particularly prefer edge habitats for foraging. It is insectivorous, foraging in the lower and middle levels of montane humid forest and cloud forests by gleaning, flycatching, and picking prey from leaves while hovering. It forages singly or in pairs, and pairs regularly join mixed-species foraging flocks.

== Status ==
The Paria whitestart is classified as Endangered by the IUCN, and is nationally Endangered in Venezuela.The potential population of mature individuals is estimated at between 1,500 and 7,000. Most of the Paria whitestart's range is protected, being within the Paria Peninsula National Park system since 1978. The majority of the population is concentrated in the suitable habitat remaining on Cerro Humo, which is thought to cover about c.15 km^{2} (9.3 mi^{2}). However, the southern slope of Cerro Humo, which may support a substantial amount of the existing Paria whitestart population, is not within the boundaries of the park and is accessible by road, and suffers from increased habitat disturbance and forest clearance as a result. The park itself is also underfunded, understaffed, and existing protections are not strongly enforced, so human disturbance and conversion of land for agricultural use continue, especially on the southern slope.

The increased growing since the 1980s of the cash crops ocumo blanco (white ocum, Xanthosoma sagittifolium) and ocumo chino (Chinese ocum or taro, Colocasia esculenta), and the burning and clearing associated with their cultivation, has created significant forest degradation and habitat destruction, particularly on Cerro Humo and Cerro Patao.

There was, to some extent, targeting of the Paria whitestart for capture and sale as a caged songbird up to the 1980s. Very little if any trade is believed to take place today, as it is not considered an attractive caged songbird.
