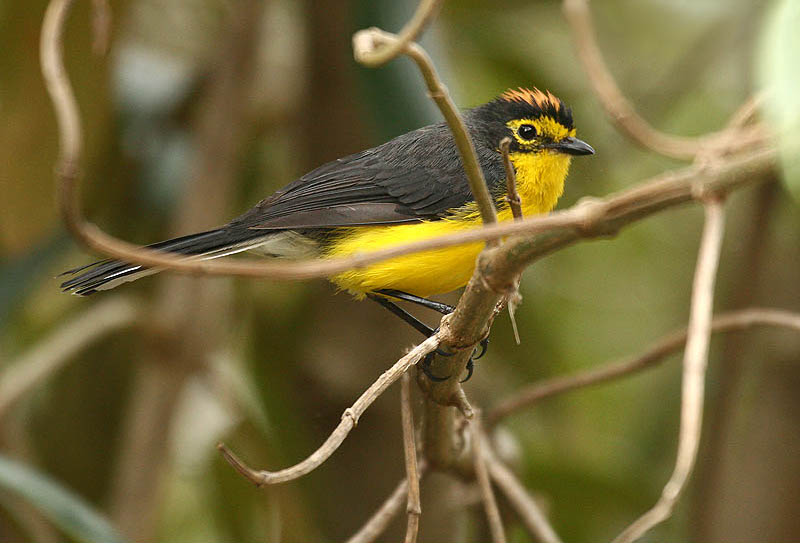

Conservation status
- Least Concern (IUCN 3.1)

Scientific classification
- Kingdom: Animalia
- Phylum: Chordata
- Class: Aves
- Order: Passeriformes
- Family: Parulidae
- Genus: Myioborus
- Species: M. melanocephalus

Binomial name
- Myioborus melanocephalus (Tschudi, 1844)
- Range of M. melanocephalus

Audio

= Spectacled whitestart =

Species of bird

The spectacled whitestart or spectacled redstart (Note: The North American and South American Classification Committees, and the Clements taxonomy which generally mirrors them, have long used "redstart". On July 25, 2026, the South American committee adopted a proposal to use "whitestart". As of that date the North American committee had a similar proposal pending.) (Myioborus melanocephalus) is a species of bird in the family Parulidae, the New World warblers. It is found from Colombia to Bolivia.

== Taxonomy and systematics ==
The spectacled whitestart was formally described in 1844 with the binomial Setophaga melanocephala, from a type specimen collected in Maraynioc, Peru. It forms a monophyletic clade with the golden-fronted whitestart (M. ornatus) and white-fronted whitestart (M. albifrons). Some authors have suggested that the spectacled and golden-fronted whitestarts should be treated as conspecific. The ranges of the northernmost spectacled and southernmost golden-fronted overlap and intermediate types and hybrids have been recorded. They are sister species.

As of July 2026, taxonomists recognize these five subspecies of the spectacled whitestart:

- M. m. ruficoronatus (Kaup, 1852)
- M. m. griseonuchus (Chapman, 1927
- M. m. malaris Zimmer, JT, 1949
- M. m. melanocephalus (Tschudi, 1844)
- M. m. bolivianus Chapman, 1919

A 2023 paper presented evidence that the type specimen of M. m. ruficoronatus is a hybrid and, by the principle of priority, the subspecies should be renamed M. m. bairdi (Salvin, 1878). It also made other suggestions for revising the taxonomy of both the spectacled and golden-fronted whitestarts. None of the suggestions have been implemented as of July 2026.

== Description ==
M. m. melanocephalus

The spectacled whitestart is 13 to 13.5 cm (5.1 to 5.3 in) long and weighs about 10 to 13 g (0.35 to 0.46 oz). The sexes have the same plumage. Adults of the nominate subspecies M. m. melanocephalus have a bright yellow supraloral stipe and eye-ring that form the eponymous spectacles; the rest of their face is black. Their nape, upperparts, and wings are gray. Their tail is black with white outer two pairs of feathers. Their throat and underparts are mostly yellow and their undertail coverts white. Juveniles have an olive-gray head and upperparts. Their throat and breast are buffy gray, their belly creamy yellowish, and their undertail coverts whitish.

The other subspecies of the spectacled whitestart differ from the nominate and each other thus:

- M. m. bolivianus: slightly smaller than nominate with slightly paler underparts
- M. m. griseonuchus: more extensive black on the face than nominate and with small rufous central crown patch
- M. m. ruficoronatus: facial black like nominate; larger rufous crown patch than griseonuchus
- M. m. malaris: more extensive black on the face than nominate

All subspecies have a dark iris, a blackish bill, and blackish legs and feet.

== Distribution and habitat ==
The spectacled whitestart has a disjunct distribution along the Andes. The subspecies are found thus:

- M. m. ruficoronatus: from Nariño Department in far southwestern Colombia south to Ecuador's Loja Province
- M. m. griseonuchus: northwestern Peru's Piura and Cajamarca departments
- M. m. malaris: northern Peru's Amazonas Department
- M. m. melanocephalus: Peru from San Martín Department south to Ayacucho Department
- M. m. bolivianus: from southern Peru's Cuzco Department south into Bolivia to Cochabamba Department

The spectacled whitestart inhabits a variety of humid landscapes including the interior and edges of montane forest, cloudforest, elfin forest, and scrublands adjoining them. In elevation it ranges between 2,200 and 3,200 m (7,200 and 10,500 ft) in Colombia, mostly between 2,200 and 4,000 m (7,200 and 13,100 ft) in Ecuador, and between 1,800 and 3,450 m (5,900 and 11,300 ft) in Peru.

== Behavior ==
=== Movement ===
The spectacled whitestart is a sedentary year-round resident.

=== Feeding ===
The spectacled whitestart feeds on insects and other arthropods. It forages by gleaning and in mid-air. It forages mostly in the forest canopy but will feed at all levels. While foraging it flicks its outer tail feathers, apparently to flush ("start") prey that it then pursues.

=== Breeding ===
The spectacled whitestart's breeding season has not been fully defined but spans at least May to January in Ecuador. It includes February and June in northern Peru, June to September in southern Peru, and January in Bolivia. Its nest is domed; the female builds it from leaves and moss lined with seed down and tree fern scales. It is placed on the ground or very low above it. The clutch is two eggs that are white with some cinnamon speckles. The incubation period is 15 days and fledging occurs 12 days after hatch. Both parents provision nestlings.

=== Vocalization ===
One description of the spectacled whitestart's song is "a variable, high-pitched series of twittering notes and phrases with little discernible pattern, sometimes long-continued and at first more subdued, gradually becoming more forceful". Another description is "a musical, high warbled phrase, rapidly repeated and swelling in volume, for up to 10 sec. or more".

== Status ==
The IUCN has assessed the spectacled whitestart as being of Least Concern. It has a large range; its population size is not known and is believed to be decreasing. No immediate threats have been identified. It is considered common in its small Colombian range, "common and conspicuous" in Ecuador, and "common and widespread" in Peru.
