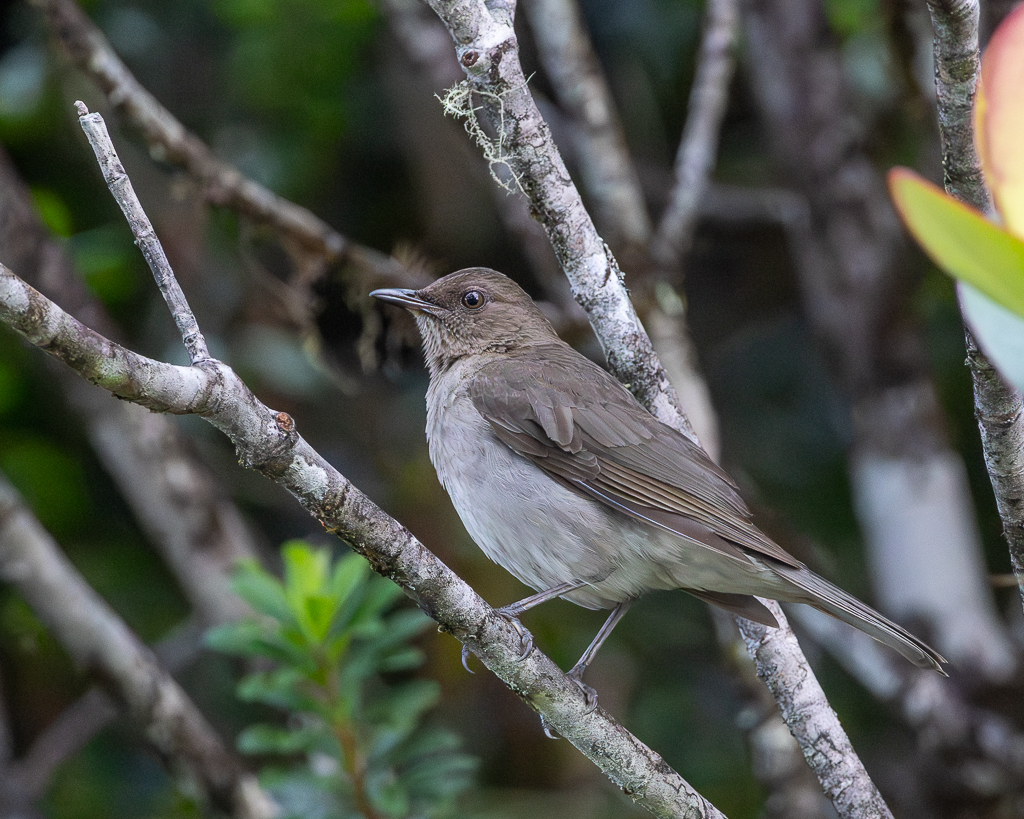

Scientific classification
- Kingdom: Animalia
- Phylum: Chordata
- Class: Aves
- Order: Passeriformes
- Family: Turdidae
- Genus: Turdus
- Species: T. murinus

Binomial name
- Turdus murinus Salvin, 1885

= Pantepui thrush =

Species of bird

The pantepui thrush (Turdus murinus) is a species of bird in the family Turdidae. It is found in Brazil, Guyana, and Venezuela.

== Taxonomy and systematics ==
The pantepui thrush was originally described by Osbert Salvin in 1885 with its current binomial Turdus murinus. Its type locality is Merumé, Mount Roraima, Guyana. Following a 1931 publication it was reassigned as a subspecies of the black-billed thrush (T. ignobilis).

The pantepui thrush's further taxonomy is unsettled. Following molecular phylogenetics studies published in the 2010s, the South American Classification Committee, the IOC, AviList, and the Clements taxonomy recognized it again as a full species. However, as of late 2025 BirdLife International's Handbook of the Birds of the World (HBW) retains it as a subspecies of the black-billed thrush.

The pantepui thrush is monotypic.

== Etymology ==
The generic name Turdus is derived from Latin, meaning "thrush", and the specific epithet murinus comes from the Latin term for "mouse-gray".

== Description ==
The pantepui thrush is about 20 cm (7.9 in) long and weighs 52 to 81 g (1.8 to 2.9 oz). The sexes have the same plumage. Adults have a mostly dusky-brown head with a white-streaked throat. Their upperparts, wings, and tail are dusky-brown. Their breast and upper flanks are a much paler dusky-brown than their upperparts. Their belly is dark ash-gray and their lower flanks and undertail coverts white. They have a dark brown iris, a black bill, and dark gray to blackish legs and feet.

== Distribution and habitat ==
The pantepui thrush is found on the lower slopes of tepuis in the southeastern Venezuelan states of Bolívar and Amazonas, in far western Guyana, and in extreme northern Brazil. The tepuis include Cerro Duida, Cerro Roraima, the Merumé Mountains, Auyán-tepui, Ptari-tepui, Sororopán-tepui, Cerro Urutani, Cerro de la Neblina, Cerro Yavi, Cerro Guanay, Cerro Camani, and Cerro Guaiquinima. The species' habitat has not been extensively studied. However, it appears to favor the edges of humid forest and early successional areas.

== Behavior ==
=== Movement ===
The pantepui thrush is believed to be a sedentary year-round resident.

=== Feeding ===
The pantepui thrush's diet and foraging behavior have not been studied. They are assumed to be similar to those of the black-billed thrush, which see here.

=== Breeding ===
Nothing is known about the pantepui thrush's breeding biology.

=== Vocalization ===
The pantepui thrush's song is not well known but is assumed to be similar to that of the black-billed thrush. Its calls are better known and described as "a nasal, rising queek!; [a] soft prip, [and] when disturbed a rather loud Quee-kipper-kipper-kipper" as it flies away.

== Status ==
The IUCN follows HBW taxonomy and so has not assessed the pantepui thrush separately from the black-billed thrush sensu lato. It is considered "uncommon to locally fairly common" in Venezuela. There are only a few records in Brazil. "Given the patchy distribution of the species, and (presumed) habitat specificity, the conservation status of this species may need re-evaluation once more data are available."
