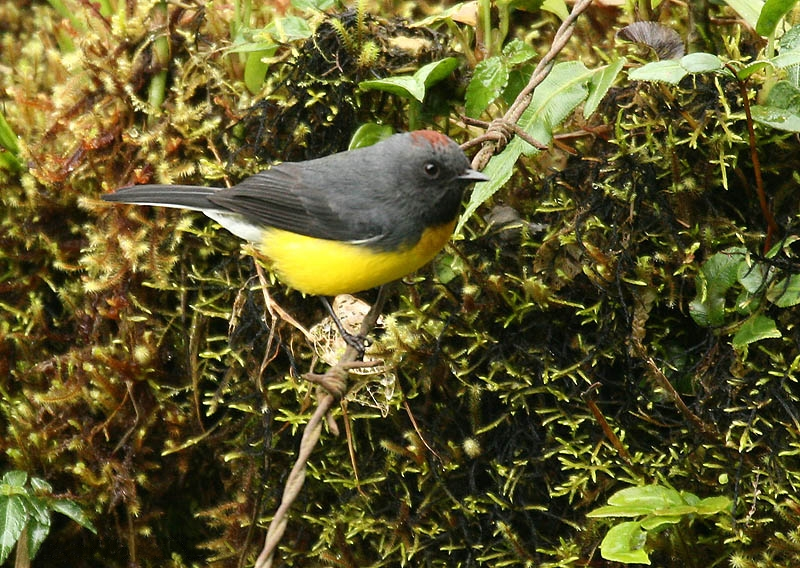
- Slate-throated whitestart, Myioborus miniatus

Scientific classification
- Kingdom: Animalia
- Phylum: Chordata
- Class: Aves
- Order: Passeriformes
- Family: Parulidae
- Genus: Myioborus; Baird, 1865

Type species
- Setophaga verticalis d'Orbigny & Lafresnaye, 1837

Species
- See text

= Whitestart =

Genus of birds

Whitestarts are New World warblers in the genus Myioborus. The English name refers to the white outer tail feathers which are a prominent feature of the members of this genus ("start" is an archaic word for "tail"). The species in this genus are also often called "redstarts".

== Taxonomy ==
The genus Myioborus was introduced in 1865 by the American naturalist Spencer Baird with Setophaga verticalis d'Orbigny & Lafresnaye, 1837, as the type species. This taxon is now considered to be a subspecies of the slate-throated whitestart (Myioborus miniatus). The genus name combines the Ancient Greek μυια/muia, μυιας/muias meaning "fly" with -βορος/-boros meaning "-devouring".

The stronghold of the whitestarts is northern South America, although a few species range along the Andes as far south as north-western Argentina, while others range north through Central America and as far north as the United States, in the case of the painted whitestart. Most species are restricted to mountain forest and woodland. The ancestral Myioborus warblers, together with those in the genus Basileuterus seem to have colonised South America early, perhaps before it was linked to the northern continent, and these two genera provide most of the resident warbler species of that region.

== Name ==
Whitestart is the name used for all species in this genus by the International Ornithological Congress and the Clements checklist, while the American Ornithological Society's North and South American Classification Committeess use "redstart". Myioborus species are not closely related to the various species called redstarts in the family Muscicapidae or to the American Redstart.

== Species ==
The genus contains the following 12 species:

Image	Scientific name	Common name	Distribution
	Myioborus pictus	Painted whitestart	Arizona and New Mexico in the southern United States to Oaxaca, Veracruz and Chiapas in Mexico to northern Nicaragua.
	Myioborus miniatus	Slate-throated whitestart	Mexico, Central America, the Andes from western Venezuela to northwestern Argentina, the Venezuelan Coastal Range, Sierra Nevada de Santa Marta and the tepuis
	Myioborus brunniceps	Brown-capped whitestart	Bolivia and north-western Argentina
	Myioborus flavivertex	Yellow-crowned whitestart	Santa Marta Mountains in Colombia.
	Myioborus albifrons	White-fronted whitestart	western Venezuela
	Myioborus ornatus	Golden-fronted whitestart	Andes of Colombia and far western Venezuela.
	Myioborus melanocephalus	Spectacled whitestart	southern Colombia to Bolivia
	Myioborus torquatus	Collared whitestart	Costa Rica and western-central Panama
	Myioborus pariae	Paria whitestart	Paria Peninsula in Venezuela
	Myioborus albifacies	White-faced whitestart	tepuis of south-western Venezuela
	Myioborus cardonai	Guaiquinima whitestart	Cerro Guaiquinima in south-eastern Venezuela.
	Myioborus castaneocapilla	Tepui whitestart	Tepuis in southern Venezuela, western Guyana and northern Brazil.

== Descriptions ==
Most whitestarts are 13–13.5 cm (5.1–5.3 in) long with dark grey or dark olive-green upperparts, except for the white outer tail feathers which are frequently spread in display. Adults have brightly coloured red, orange or yellow bellies. Many species have contrasting black, rufous or yellow caps or distinctive facial patterns, often with white or yellow "spectacles" around the eye.

The painted whitestart, the most northern form, is larger (15 cm (5.9 in) long) and has a different plumage pattern, song and behaviour from the other whitestarts. It is also the only species which is partially migratory, and it could perhaps be placed in a separate genus.

The sexes are similar, as with most resident tropical warblers, since they pair for life, and have little need of sexual dimorphism, unlike many migratory species where the males need to reclaim territory and advertise for mates each year.

== Distribution and habitat ==
The whitestarts are resident in mountain (including tepui) forest, woodland and shrub, where they feed on insects, sometimes as part of a mixed-species feeding flock.
