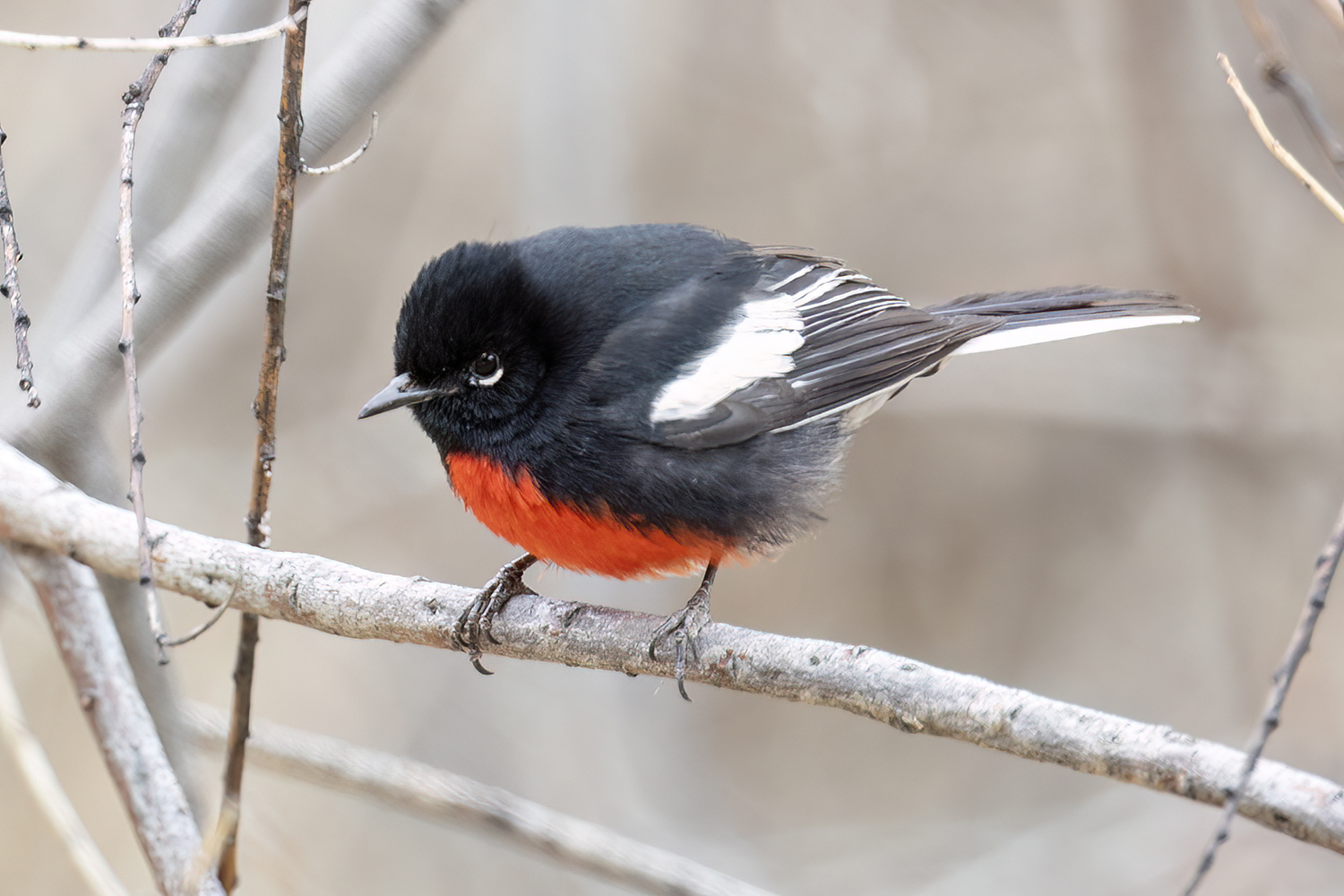

Conservation status
- Least Concern (IUCN 3.1)

Scientific classification
- Kingdom: Animalia
- Phylum: Chordata
- Class: Aves
- Order: Passeriformes
- Family: Parulidae
- Genus: Myioborus
- Species: M. pictus

Binomial name
- Myioborus pictus (Swainson, 1829)
- Range of M. pictus Breeding range Year-round range

Synonyms
- Setophaga pictus

= Painted redstart =

Species of bird

The painted redstart or painted whitestart (Myioborus pictus) is a species of New World warbler found in mountainous areas across inland Central America. They are among the largest warblers, reaching the length of 6 inches (150 mm), tail included. Adult birds have glossy black plumage, with white strips on the wing and a bright red belly. Female and male birds have similar appearance. Unusually for warblers, females are known to be as proficient at singing as their male counterparts.

== Taxonomy ==
When he first described the species in 1829, naturalist William Swainson assigned it to the genus Setophaga — the same genus as that of the American redstart — where it remained for nearly a century and a half, though one naturalist placed it in the Old World flycatcher genus Muscicapa during that time. By the mid 1960s, researchers recommended that it be moved to its current genus, Myioborus, based on various similarities with the other whitestarts. The painted redstart is the sister taxon to all the other species in the genus Myioborus.

There are two subspecies, which differ only slightly in appearance:

- M. p. pictus is found from Arizona and New Mexico in the southern United States to Oaxaca and Veracruz in Mexico. Birds in the northern part of the range tend to migrate to the southern parts of the subspecies' range for the winter.
- M. p. guatemalae, which is found from Chiapas in southern Mexico to northern Nicaragua, has little or no white edging on the tertials and less white on the fourth rectrix of the tail. It is non-migratory.

== Description ==
The painted redstart is the largest species of Myioborus, measuring 5.1–5.9 in (13–15 cm) in length, 8.3 inches (21 cm) in wingspan and having a weight of 0.3–0.4 oz (8.5–11.3 g).

The sexes are the same in plumage, though males average slightly larger than females. The adult is mostly black, with a bright red lower breast and belly, large white wing patches, white outer tail feathers and white crescents below its eyes. The bill and legs are blackish.

The juvenile painted redstart lacks the red belly and glossy black plumage of the adult. It is brownish-gray overall, with a paler belly and undertail coverts, and a pale cream or buff tinge to its wing patches. The young have a deep yellow-orange mouth lining.

=== Voice ===
Painted redstarts are unusual amongst birds, and especially amongst warblers, in that the female is capable of singing just as well as a male, and during spring courtship a pair will often bond by singing together.

== Distribution and habitat ==
Painted redstarts are common in open oak woodlands and canyons at heights between 1,500–2,500 m (4,900–8,200 ft) in Central America and Mexico, ranging as far north as the Madrean sky islands and Mogollon Rim in Arizona and New Mexico and Big Bend National Park in Texas; they are thought to be wholly insectivorous. During the summer and winter, these birds may venture as far south as Nicaragua. In 2010, a painted redstart was found further north in California than had ever been recorded, in Auburn, CA, east of Sacramento. In 2013, one was observed in Berkeley, CA.

== Breeding ==
Their nesting is done on the ground, and they create their nests so that they will be hidden among rocks, roots, or tufts of grass on steeply sloping ground. Their nests are large and shallow, constructed of strips of bark, plant fibers, leaves, and grass. The female will lay 3 or 4 white to cream-colored eggs that are speckled with fine brown and reddish spots. Incubation lasts about 14 days, but other nesting details are largely unknown.
