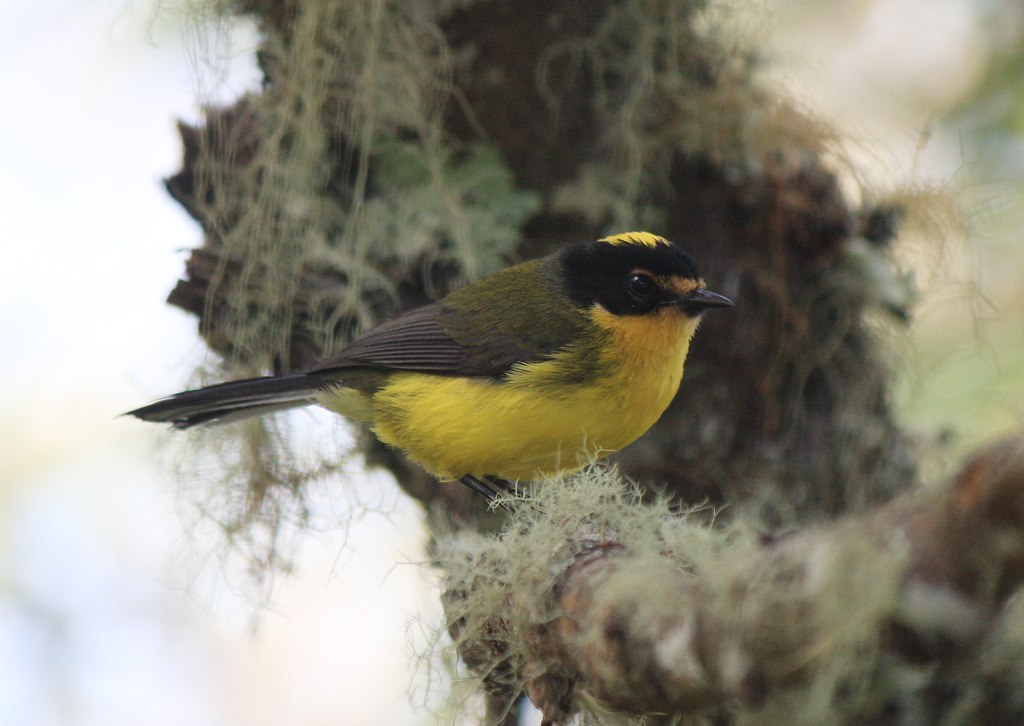

Conservation status
- Least Concern (IUCN 3.1)

Scientific classification
- Kingdom: Animalia
- Phylum: Chordata
- Class: Aves
- Order: Passeriformes
- Family: Parulidae
- Genus: Myioborus
- Species: M. flavivertex

Binomial name
- Myioborus flavivertex (Salvin, 1887)

= Yellow-crowned whitestart =

Species of bird

The yellow-crowned whitestart (Myioborus flavivertex), Santa Marta whitestart or yellow-crowned redstart (Note: The North American and South American Classification Committees, and the Clements taxonomy which generally mirrors them, have long used "redstart". On July 25, 2026, the South American committee adopted a proposal to use "whitestart". As of that date the North American committee had a similar proposal pending.), is a species of bird in the family Parulidae, the New World warblers. It is endemic to the Sierra Nevada de Santa Marta of Colombia.

== Taxonomy and systematics ==
The yellow-crowned whitestart was formally described in 1887 with the binomial Setophaga flavivertex. It is monotypic.

== Description ==
The yellow-crowned whitestart is about 13 cm (5.1 in) long. The sexes have the same plumage. Adults have a mostly black head with a light yellow crown, a buffy stripe above the lores, and a buffy crescent above the eye. Their upperparts and wings are olive-green. Their tail is blackish gray with much white on the outer feathers. The middle of their chin is black and their throat yellow, often washed with ochre. Their underparts are mostly yellow and their undertail coverts white. They have a dark iris, a blackish bill, and blackish legs and feet. Juveniles have an olive-brown head and upperparts. Their greater and median upperwing coverts have pale olive-buff tips that show as two wing bars. Their throat and underparts are buff that is paler on the belly and undertail coverts.

== Distribution and habitat ==
The yellow-crowned whitestart is found only in the isolated Sierra Nevada de Santa Marta in far northern Colombia. It inhabits the interior and edges of humid montane forest and cloudforest in the subtropical and temperate zones. In elevation it ranges between 1,200 and 3,000 m (3,900 and 9,800 ft) though mostly above 2,000 m (6,600 ft).

== Behavior ==
=== Movement ===
The yellow-crowned whitestart is a sedentary year-round resident.

=== Feeding ===
The yellow-crowned whitestart feeds on insects and probably other arthropods. It forages mostly by gleaning from the forest's middle levels to near the crown and sometimes takes prey in mid-air. While foraging it pumps its tail up and down. Family groups often join mixed-species feeding flocks.

=== Breeding ===
The yellow-crowned whitestart's breeding season has not been fully defined but includes at least April to July. Its nest is usually well hidden on the ground or an earthen bank. Two nests each had clutches of two; the eggs were white with small brown spots. Nothing else is known about the species' breeding biology.

=== Vocalization ===
The yellow-crowned whitestart's song is "a rather weak but sibilant series of high-pitched chwee notes on one pitch" and its call "a sharp chip".

== Status ==
The IUCN has assessed the yellow-crowned whitestart as being of Least Concern. It has a small range; its population size is not known but is believed to be stable. "The species is projected to undergo moderate rates of decline due to deforestation across the species' suitable habitat range." It is considered common.
