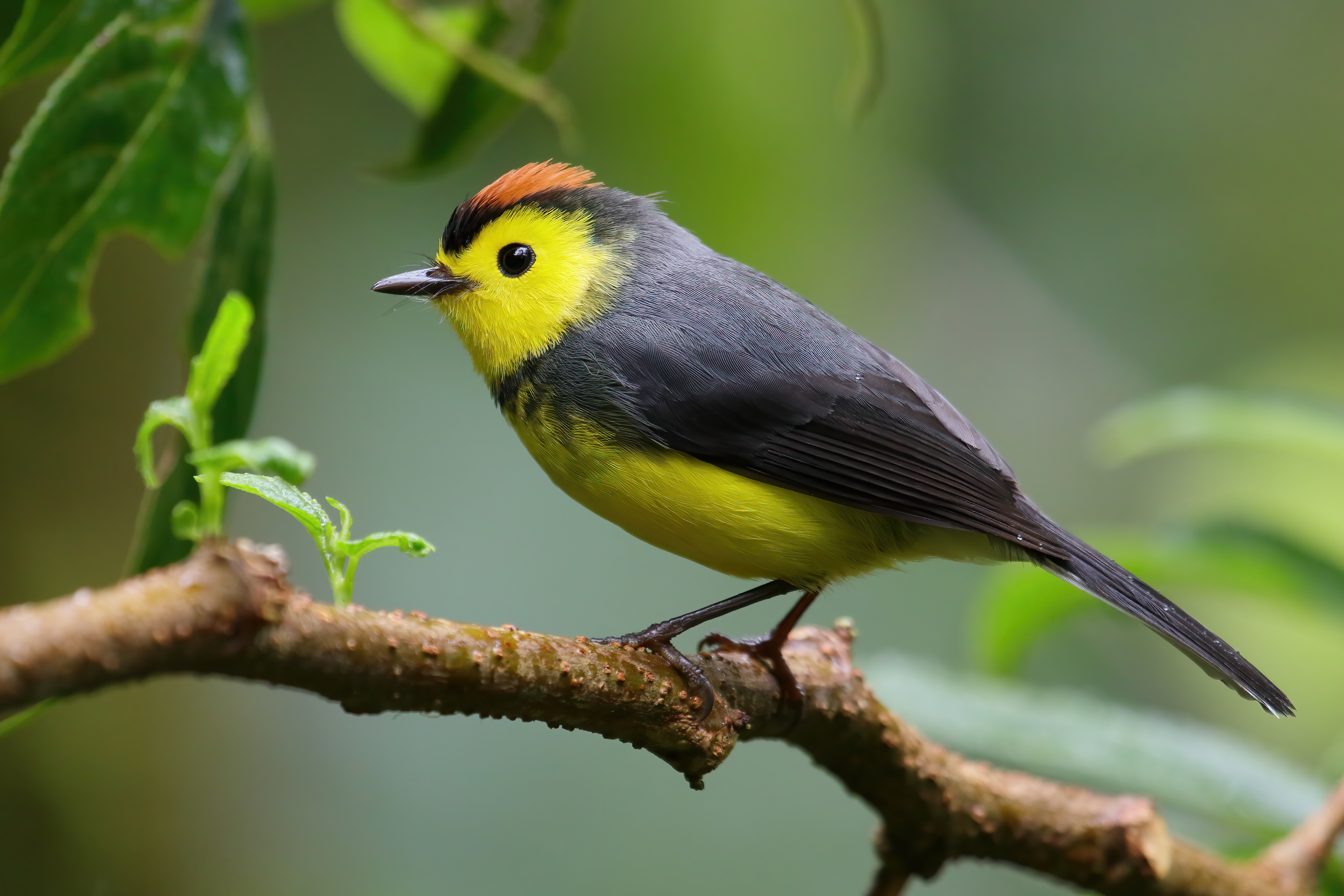
- In Costa Rica

Conservation status
- Least Concern (IUCN 3.1)

Scientific classification
- Kingdom: Animalia
- Phylum: Chordata
- Class: Aves
- Order: Passeriformes
- Family: Parulidae
- Genus: Myioborus
- Species: M. torquatus

Binomial name
- Myioborus torquatus (Baird, 1865)

= Collared whitestart =

Species of bird

The collared whitestart (Myioborus torquatus), also known as the collared redstart, (Note: The North American and South American Classification Committees, and the Clements taxonomy which generally mirrors them, have long used "redstart". On July 25, 2026, the South American committee adopted a proposal to use "whitestart". As of that date the North American committee had a similar proposal pending.) is a species of bird in the family Parulidae, the New World warblers. It is found in Costa Rica and Panama.

== Taxonomy and systematics ==
The collared whitestart was formally described in 1865 with the binomial Setophaga torquata. It is monotypic.

== Description ==
The collared whitestart is about 12 to 13.5 cm (4.7 to 5.3 in) long and weighs about 10 to 11 g (0.35 to 0.39 oz). The sexes have the same plumage. Adults have rufous central crown with a black border beneath it that extends to the nape; the rest of their head including the throat is yellow. Their upperparts and wings are slate gray. Their tail is blackish with much white on the outer two pairs of feathers. Their underparts are yellow with a slate gray band across the upper breast. They have a mouse-brown iris, a black bill, and dusky brown or black legs and feet. Juveniles have a slate gray head with no rufous or yellow. Their upperparts are dark slate gray with a brown wash. Their throat and breast are slate gray and their belly dull yellow.

== Distribution and habitat ==
The collared whitestart is found intermittently through Costa Rica on the Cordillera de Tilarán, Cordillera Central, and Cordillera de Talamanca and continuing as far as Veraguas Province in western Panama. It primarily inhabits the edges and gaps of humid montane forest both primary and secondary. It also occurs in nearby brushy ravines and pastures. In Costa Rica it ranges in elevation from 1,500 m (4,900 ft) to tree line at about 3,500 m (11,500 ft).

== Behavior ==
=== Movement ===
The collared whitestart is a sedentary year-round resident.

=== Feeding ===
The collared whitestart's diet has not been studied but is known to be mostly arthropods. It forages by gleaning and with sallies in mid-air. It forages mostly from the forest's mid-level canopy but will feed at all levels including near the ground. While foraging it flicks its outer tail feathers, apparently to flush ("start") prey that it then pursues. It also attends army ant swarms to capture prey fleeing the ants and has been observed following cattle and people, apparently for the same reason. Pairs and family groups often join mixed-species feeding flocks.

=== Breeding ===
The collared whitestart breeds between March and May in Costa Rica. Its nest is a globe with a side opening. The female builds it from bamboo and other leaves lined with fine plant fibers and tree fern scales. It is placed on the ground and may be hidden in grass, under a log, or in a niche in an earthen bank. The clutch is two to three eggs that are white with small pale brown markings. The female alone incubates, for about 15 days. Fledging occurs about 13 days after hatch.

=== Vocalization ===
The collared whitestart's song is generally "warbles, trills, and slurred whistles" described as "delightful ... long-continued, full and mellow in tone, varied in phrasing". Another song is "a rather soft, slightly musical tsit-tsit-tsee, repeated". Its call is "a sharp pit or tzip".

== Status ==
The IUCN has assessed the collared whitestart as being of Least Concern. It has a large range; its estimated population of at least 50,000 mature individuals is believed to be decreasing. No immediate threats have been identified. It is considered common in Costa Rica. "Collared Redstart likely is not especially sensitive to disturbance, as it tolerates forest edges and taller second growth. It does require forest cover, however, and so is vulnerable to advancing deforestation."
