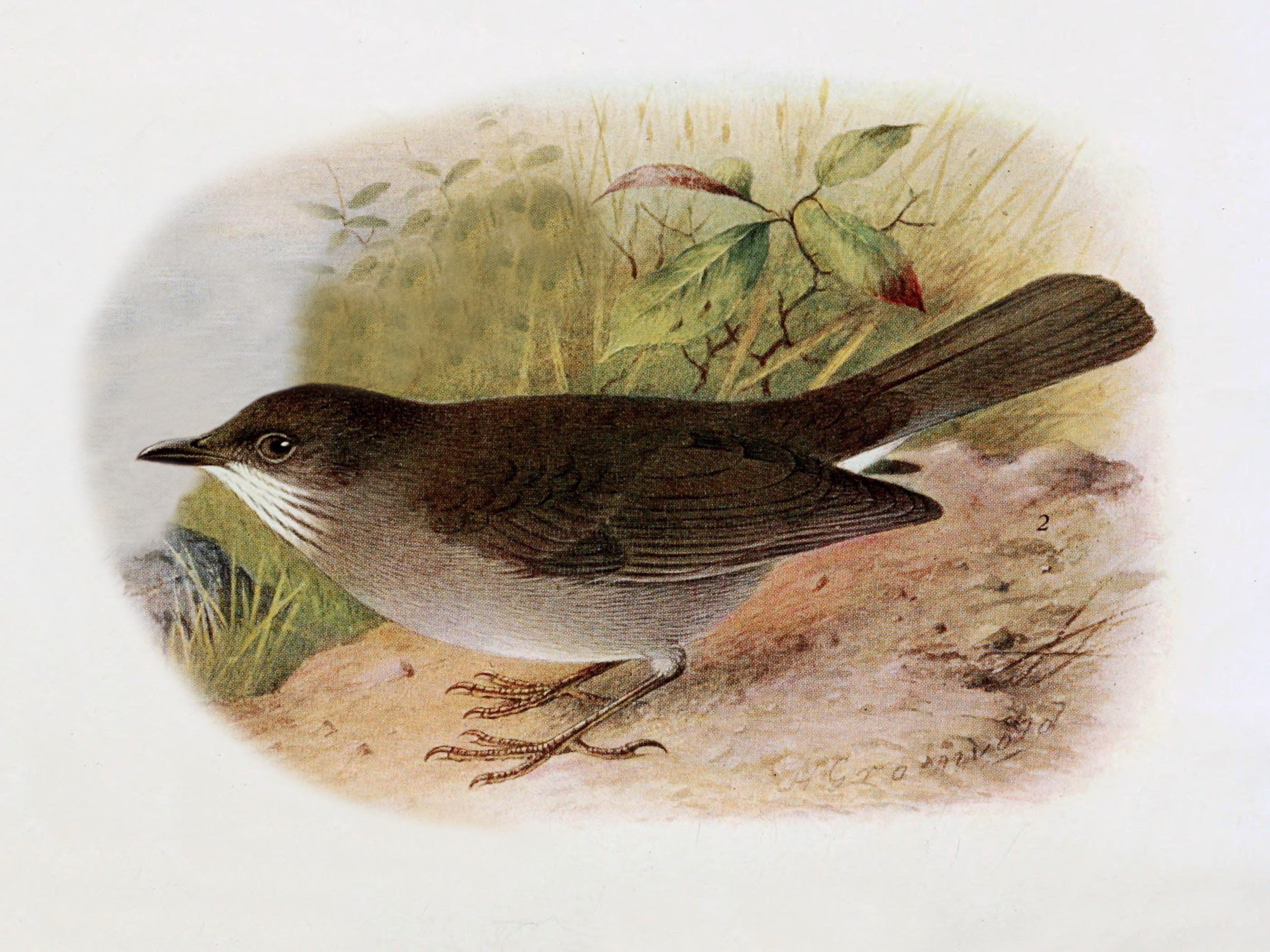

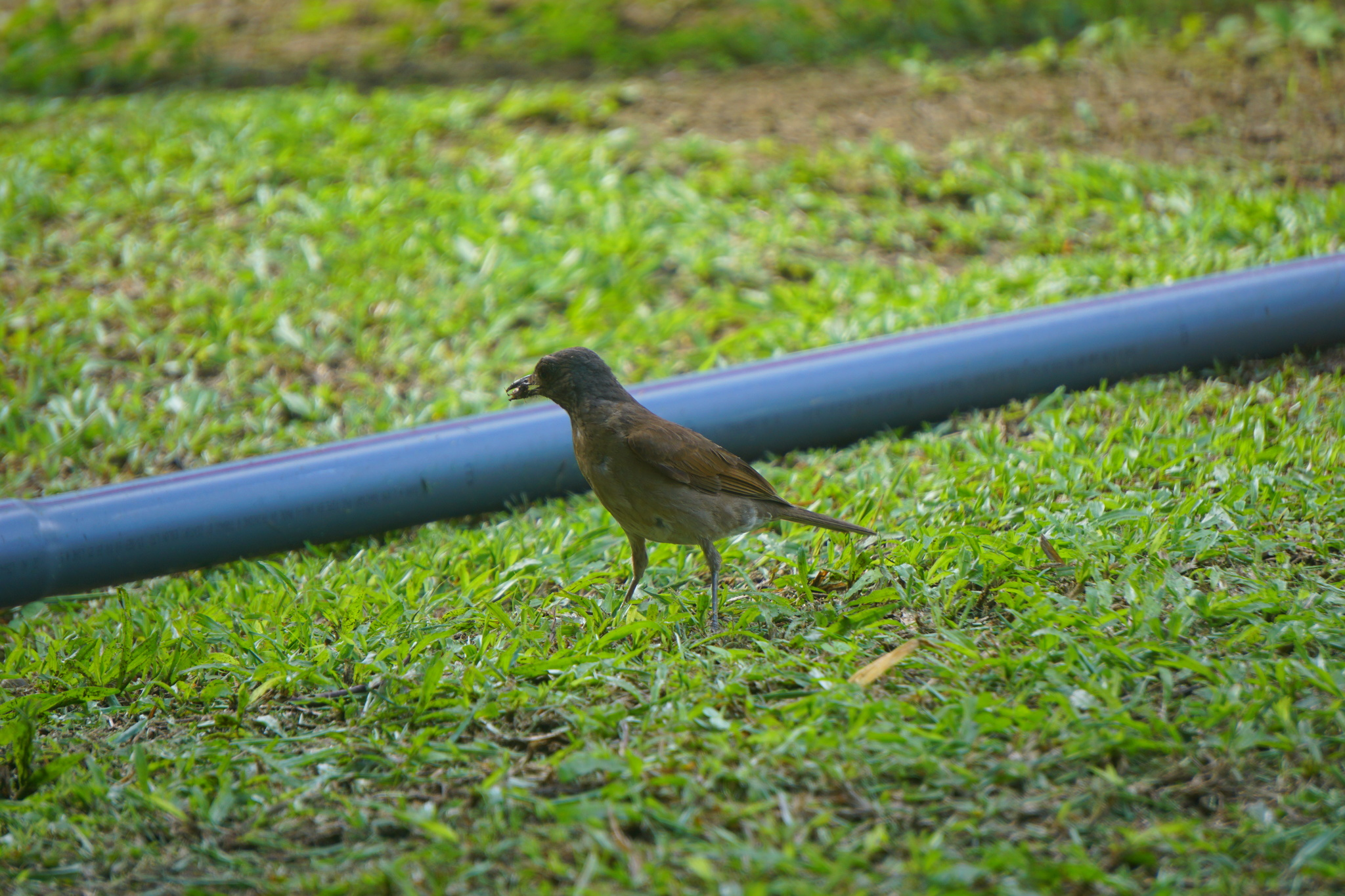

Conservation status
- Least Concern (IUCN 3.1)

Scientific classification
- Kingdom: Animalia
- Phylum: Chordata
- Class: Aves
- Order: Passeriformes
- Family: Turdidae
- Genus: Turdus
- Species: T. arthuri

Binomial name
- Turdus arthuri (Chubb, C, 1914)

= Campina thrush =

Species of bird

The campina thrush (Turdus arthuri) is a species of bird in the family Turdidae. It is found in Bolivia, Brazil, Colombia, Guyana, Suriname, and Venezuela.

== Taxonomy and systematics ==
The campina thrush was originally described as Planesticus arthuri by Charles Chubb in 1914 from a specimen taken near the Abary River in British Guiana (modern day Guyana). Chub gave it the specific epithet arthuri to honor the son of F. V. McConnell: the senior McConnell had collected the type specimen. Following a 1931 publication it was reassigned as a subspecies of the black-billed thrush (T. ignobilis). Following molecular phylogenetics studies published in the 2010s, taxonomic systems recognized it again as a full species.

The campina thrush is monotypic.

== Description ==
The campina thrush is 21.5 to 24 cm (8.5 to 9.4 in) long and weighs 50 to 66 g (1.8 to 2.3 oz). The sexes have the same plumage. Adults have a mostly dark grayish brown head with a dusky-streaked white throat. Their upperparts, wings, and tail are dark grayish brown. Their underparts are mostly dull gray that becomes dirty white on the lower belly and undertail coverts. They have a dark iris, a dusky black bill, and dusky black legs and feet. Juveniles are similar to adults but with buff spots and streaks on their upperparts, spotted buff wing bars, and brown mottling on their underparts.

== Distribution and habitat ==
The campina thrush has a highly disjunct distribution. It is found in extreme eastern Colombia and across southern Venezuela and Guyana into Suriname. It is also found in many widely scattered locations throughout Amazonian Brazil. The South American Classification Committee has at least one documented record in Bolivia, a location not mentioned in other sources. In Venezuela it is primarily found on Cerro Duida and Cerro Yapacana. In general it inhabits a variety of semi-open to open landscapes including light woodlands, mature secondary forest, disturbed areas, parks, and gardens. In all areas, and especially in Amazonia, it favors campina, a biome characterized by scanty vegetation on sandy soil.

== Behavior ==
=== Movement ===
The campina thrush is believed to be a sedentary year-round resident.

=== Feeding ===
The campina thrush's diet and feeding behavior have not been studied. but are assumed to be similar to those of the black-billed thrush, which see here. It is known to feed on fruit in trees and bushes and also to feed on the ground.

=== Breeding ===
The only information about the campina thrush's breeding biology comes from Suriname. There its season spans at least from December to March. Two nests were open cups made from moss, lined with rootlets, and placed on the ground. One had two eggs that were pale greenish blue with brown speckles.

=== Vocalization ===
The campina thrush's song has not been analyzed in detail but has been likened to that of the American Robin.

== Status ==
The IUCN has assessed the campina thrush as being of Least Concern. It has a large range; its population size is not known but is believed to be stable. No immediate threats have been identified. It is considered uncommon to fairly common in the northern part of its range but little is known about its abundance in Brazil.
