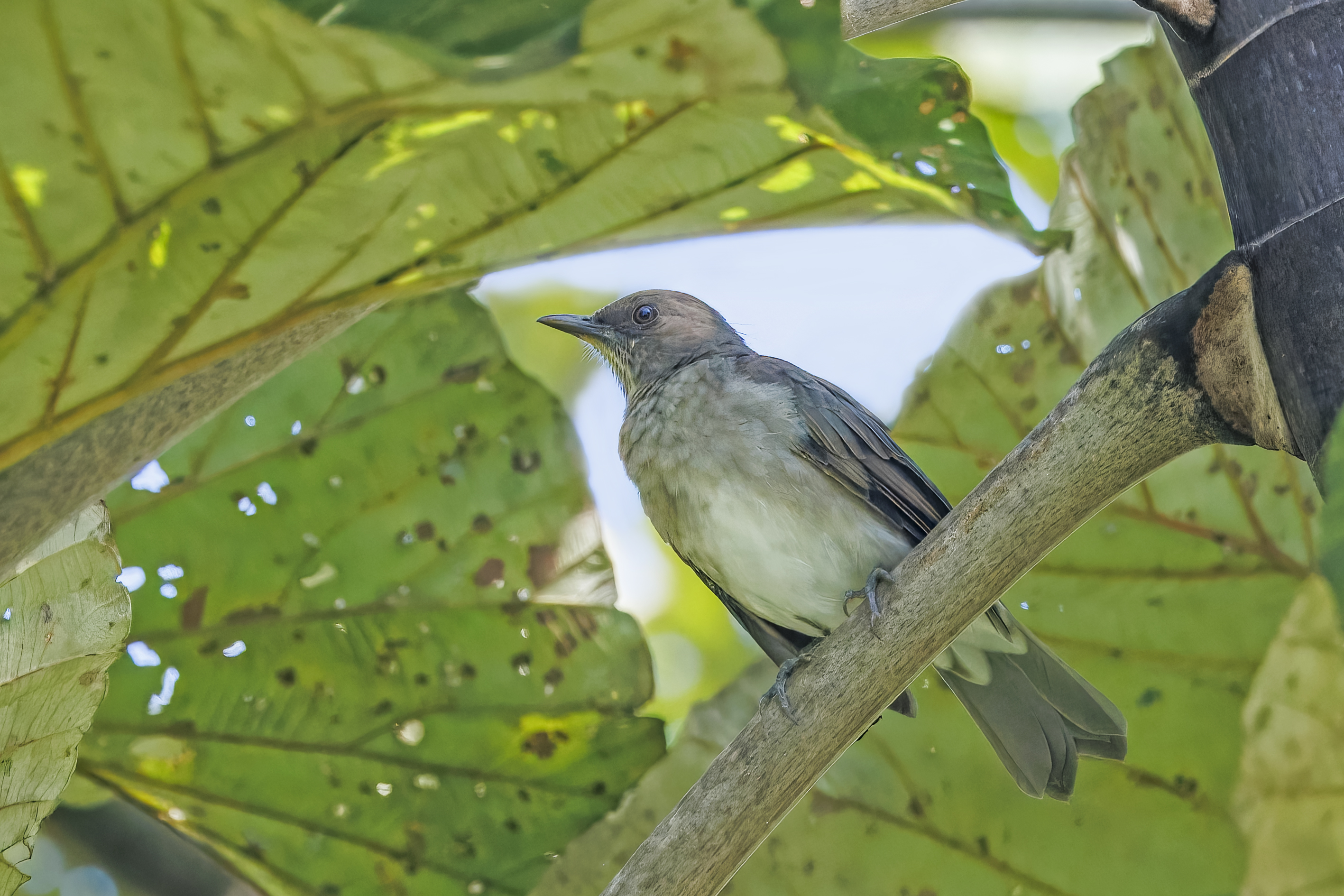
- Turdus ignobilis debilis, Ecuador
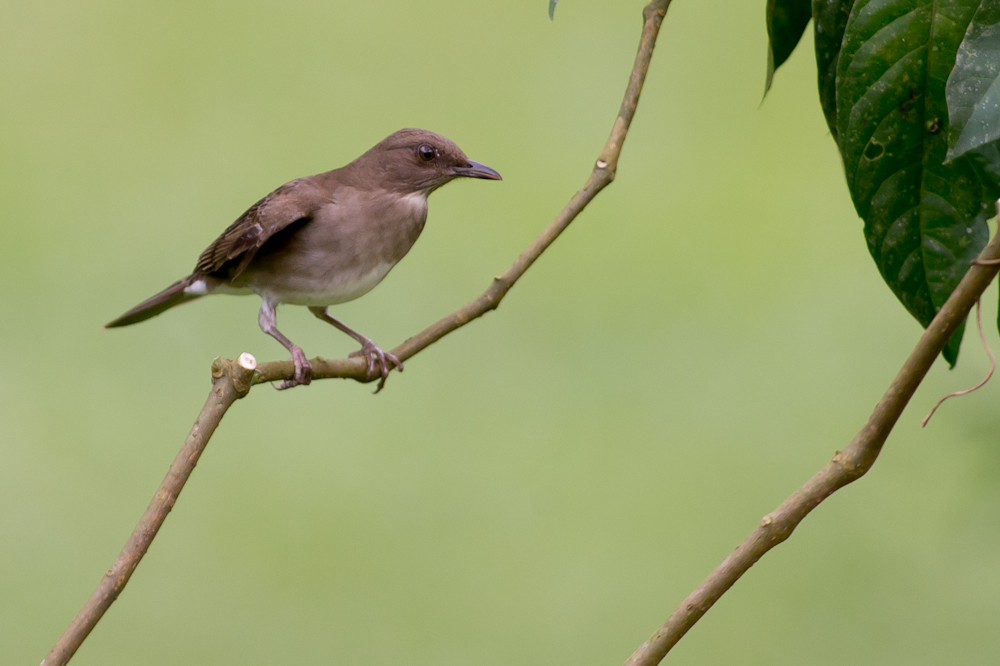
- In Colombia

Scientific classification
- Kingdom: Animalia
- Phylum: Chordata
- Class: Aves
- Order: Passeriformes
- Family: Turdidae
- Genus: Turdus
- Species: T. ignobilis

Binomial name
- Turdus ignobilis Sclater, PL, 1858
- This map is not accurate - see the Taxonomy, Distribution, and Status sections.

= Black-billed thrush =

Species of bird

The black-billed thrush (Turdus ignobilis) is a species of bird in the family Turdidae. It is found in Bolivia, Brazil, Colombia, Ecuador, Peru, and Venezuela.

== Taxonomy and systematics ==
The black-billed thrush was originally described in 1858 with its current binomial Turdus ignobilis. Its further taxonomy is unsettled.

In the early twentieth century two subspecies were added, T. i. goodfellowi (Hartert, EJO & Hellmayr, 1901) and T. i. debilis (Hellmayr, 1902). A 1931 publication added two more that had originally been described as species, T. i. arthuri (Chubb, C, 1914) and T. i. murinus (Salvin, 1885).

Molecular phylogenetics studies published in the 2010s determined that arthuri and murinus should again be established as full species. Following those studies, the South American Classification Committee, the IOC, AviList, and the Clements taxonomy recognized them as the campina thrush and pantepui thrush respectively. With these moves the systems returned the black-billed thrush to its early twentieth century status with three subspecies.

As of late 2025 BirdLife International's Handbook of the Birds of the World (HBW) recognizes the campina thrush (arthuri) as a species. However, it retains murinus as a subspecies of the black-billed thrush. In addition, it treats debilis as a separate species, the "floodplain thrush".

This article follows the IOC et al. treatment of the black-billed thrush as having ignobilis, goodfellowi, and debilis as its subspecies.

== Description ==
The black-billed thrush is 18.5 to 24 cm (7.3 to 9.4 in) long and weighs 48 to 81 g (1.7 to 2.9 oz). The sexes have the same plumage. Adults of the nominate subspecies T. i. ignobilis have an olive-brown head and upperparts with a slightly darker face and an off-white throat with dark streaks. Their breast and flanks are a paler olive-brown and their belly and undertail coverts are whitish. They have a black iris, a black bill, and dark gray-brown to black legs and feet. Subspecies T. i. goodfellowi has warmer and darker olive-brown upperparts than the nominate. T. i. debilis has more white on the throat and upper breast than the nominate, with weaker streaks on the throat and grayer breast and flanks.

== Distribution and habitat ==
The black-billed thrush has a disjunct distribution. The nominate subspecies is found in Colombia's Central and Eastern Andes. Subspecies T. i. goodfellowi is found in Colombia's Cauca River valley and on the western slope of the country's Western Andes. The range of T. i. debilis is separate from those of the other two subspecies and is much larger. It extends on both slopes of the Venezuelan Andes from Barinas and Zulia states southwest across eastern Colombia and south through eastern Ecuador and eastern Peru into northern Bolivia, and from those countries into most of western and central Amazonian Brazil, there mostly along major river corridors.

The black-billed thrush inhabits a wide variety of semi-open to open landscapes. These include the edges and clearings of humid forest, gallery forest in open savanna, somewhat open secondary forest, shade coffee plantations, early succession areas, brushy pastures, and human-maintained areas like parks and gardens. In elevation it ranges up to 1,600 m (5,200 ft) in Venezuela, to 2,600 m (8,500 ft) in Colombia, to 1,200 m (3,900 ft) in Ecuador and Peru, and to 2,000 m (6,600 ft) in Brazil.

== Behavior ==
=== Movement ===
The black-billed thrush is believed to be a sedentary year-round resident.

=== Feeding ===
The black-billed thrush feeds on berries, seeds, insects, and other invertebrates like worms. It usually forages singly or in pairs and seldom joins mixed-species feeding flocks. It takes fruit mostly in trees and shrubs but also feeds on the ground in sheltered areas.

=== Breeding ===
The black-billed thrush's breeding season has not been fully defined. It includes December to August in Colombia, though varying within the country. It spans at least November to February in Ecuador and includes January in Peru. Its nest is a cup made from moss and mud lined with finer fibers. "Nests have been recorded in bushes, on stumps, in the fork of trees, and similar situations, usually below 5 m (16 ft)". The clutch is two or three eggs that are greenish blue heavy with brown markings. The incubation period is apparently about 13 to 16 days and fledging occurs about 14 to 17 days after hatch. Both parents provision nestlings.

=== Vocalization ===
The black-billed thrush's song in Venezuela is "a rather slow caroling churre, churre, ee, TE-O-we, churre... and so on with pleasing, relaxed phrases; some individuals sing very repetitive phrases". It calls there are "a loud pfeea! or wEEa!". Similarly, in Peru it is described as "a pleasant and musical caroling, often with a particular phrase given twice". Its calls there are "a low kirk or wurk, a liquid kwip or quit-quit, and a rising week".

== Status ==
The IUCN follows HBW taxonomy and so has assessed a different black-billed thrush than the one recognized by the majority of taxonomic systems. Their assessment includes the same T. i. ignobilis and T. i. goodfellowi as the others but omits T. i. debilis and includes what the others treat as T. murinus. The species is "uncommon to locally fairly common" in Venezuela, common in Colombia, fairly common in Ecuador and Peru, and "common to frequent" in Brazil.
