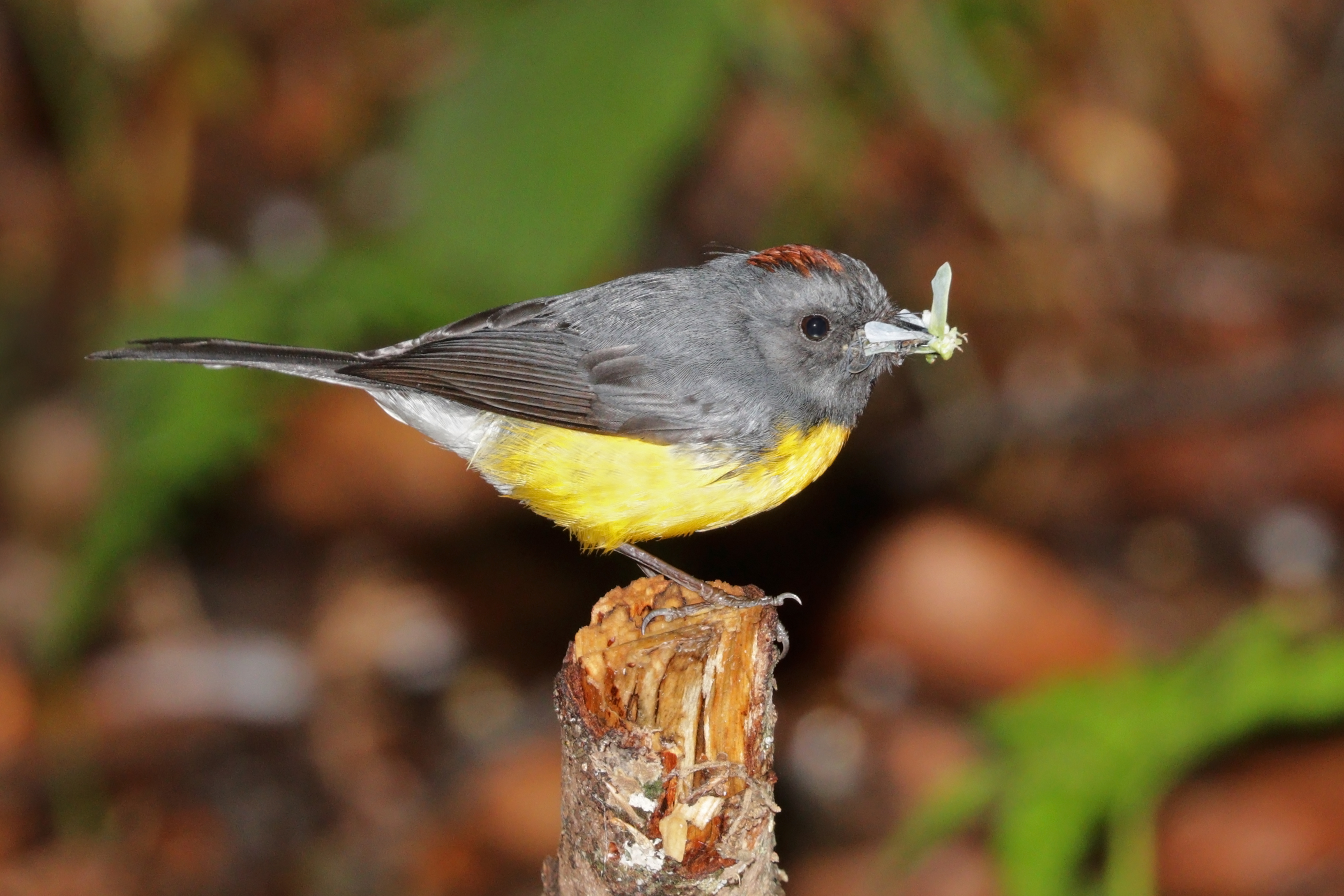
- Myioborus miniatus aurantiacus, Panama
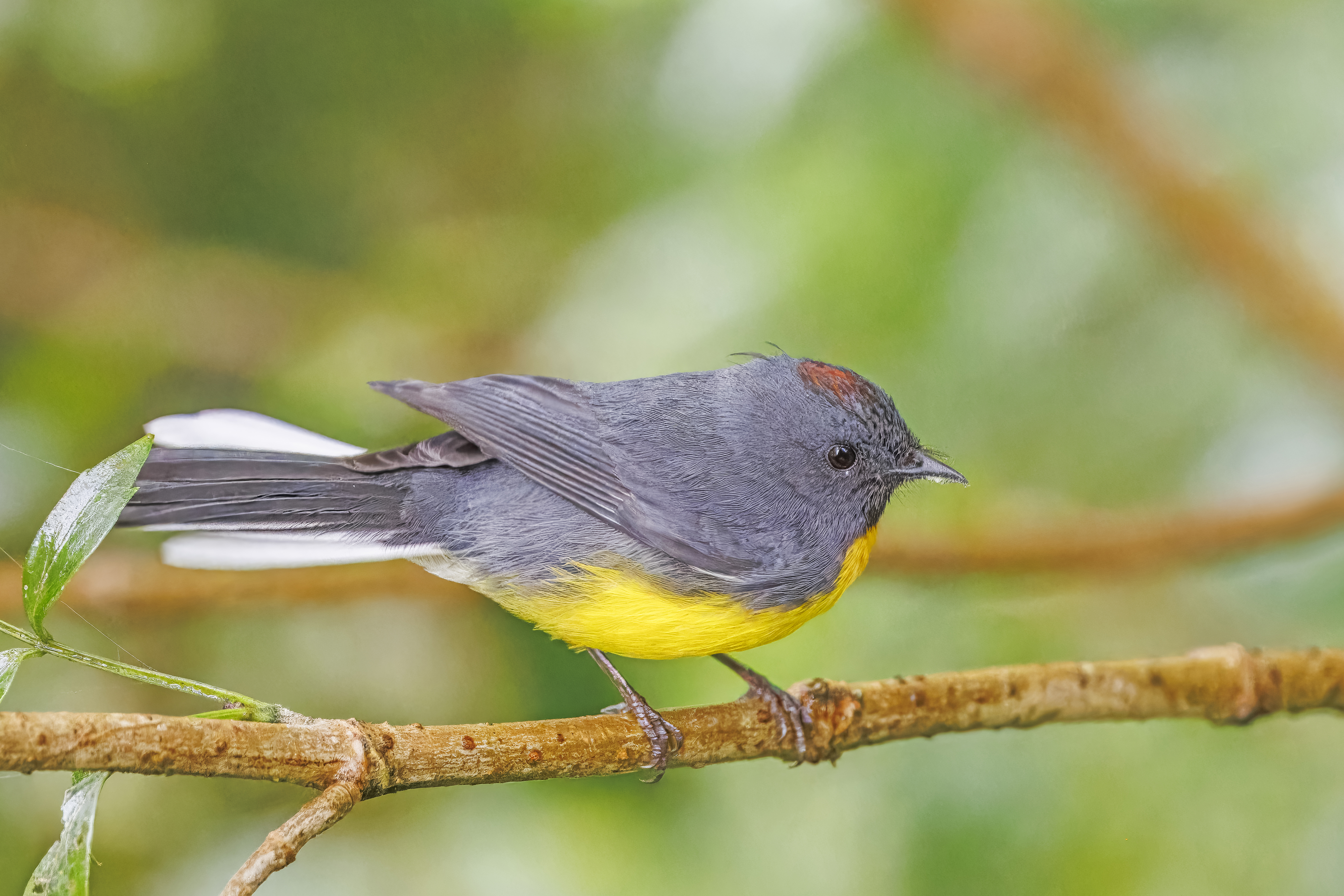
- Myioborus miniatus ballux, Ecuador

Conservation status
- Least Concern (IUCN 3.1)

Scientific classification
- Kingdom: Animalia
- Phylum: Chordata
- Class: Aves
- Order: Passeriformes
- Family: Parulidae
- Genus: Myioborus
- Species: M. miniatus

Binomial name
- Myioborus miniatus (Swainson, 1827)
- Range

= Slate-throated whitestart =

Species of bird

The slate-throated whitestart (Myioborus miniatus), also known as the slate-throated redstart, is a small insectivorous bird in the New World warbler family Parulidae that is native to Central and South America.

== Taxonomy ==
The slate-throated whitestart was formally described in 1827 by the English zoologist William Swainson based on a specimen collected in Valladolid (Morelia) in the Mexican state of Michoacán. Swainson coined the binomial name Setophaga miniata where the specific epithet is from Latin miniatus meaning "painted vermilion". The slate-throated whitestart is now one of twelve species placed in the genus Myioborus that was introduced in 1865 by the American naturalist Spencer Baird.

Twelve subspecies are recognised:

- M. m. miniatus (Swainson, 1827) – west, southwest Mexico
- M. m. molochinus Wetmore, 1942 – east Mexico
- M. m. intermedius (Hartlaub, 1852) – south Mexico and east Guatemala
- M. m. hellmayri Van Rossem, 1936 – south Guatemala and southwest El Salvador
- M. m. connectens Dickey & Van Rossem, 1928 – El Salvador and Honduras to central north Nicaragua
- M. m. comptus Wetmore, 1944 – west, central Costa Rica
- M. m. aurantiacus (Baird, SF, 1865) – east Costa Rica and west Panama
- M. m. ballux Wetmore & Phelps, WH, 1944 – east Panama to north Ecuador and west Venezuela
- M. m. sanctaemartae Zimmer, JT, 1949 – north Colombia
- M. m. pallidiventris (Chapman, 1899) – north Venezuela
- M. m. subsimilis Zimmer, JT, 1949 – southwest Ecuador and northwest Peru
- M. m. verticalis (d'Orbigny & Lafresnaye, 1837) – south Ecuador to central Bolivia, southeast Venezuela, west Guyana and north Brazil

== Description ==
The slate-throated whitestart is a long-tailed warbler measuring 12 cm (4.7 in) long. It has a deep rufous head, dark back, and contrasting bright yellow breast, belly and white vent and tail tips. The bill is black, and the legs are blackish-gray.

While most of its plumage changes little throughout its large range, the underparts grade from yellow in most of its range, to red in the northernmost part.

== Distribution and habitat ==
It is found disjunctly in humid highland forests, from upper understory to mid canopy, in Mexico, Central America, the Andes from western Venezuela to northwestern Argentina, the Venezuelan Coastal Range, Sierra Nevada de Santa Marta and the tepuis. It occurs at around 600 to 2,500 m (2,000 to 8,200 ft) above sea level.

In July 2024, a specimen was spotted in the Sigmund Stern Recreation Grove of San Francisco, California. The sighting was confirmed by multiple birdwatching enthusiasts. This is the furthest north the species has ever been observed.

== Behavior ==
Pairs remain together throughout year, often accompanying mixed flocks. It hops and flits about while flashing its tail to frighten insects which are then caught in aerial pursuits. It will occasionally take protein corpuscles from Cecropia plants and will occasionally glean insects from tree bark.

The slate-throated whitestart's call note is a sharp "pik" note. The song varies with region, although throughout most of range it is a varied series of whistled notes, some slurred up, some slurred down.

From April to May, pairs nest in a bulky, roofed structure with a side entrance, usually nestled in niche in bank or steep slope. The female lays 3, or sometimes 2, speckled white eggs.

== Gallery ==
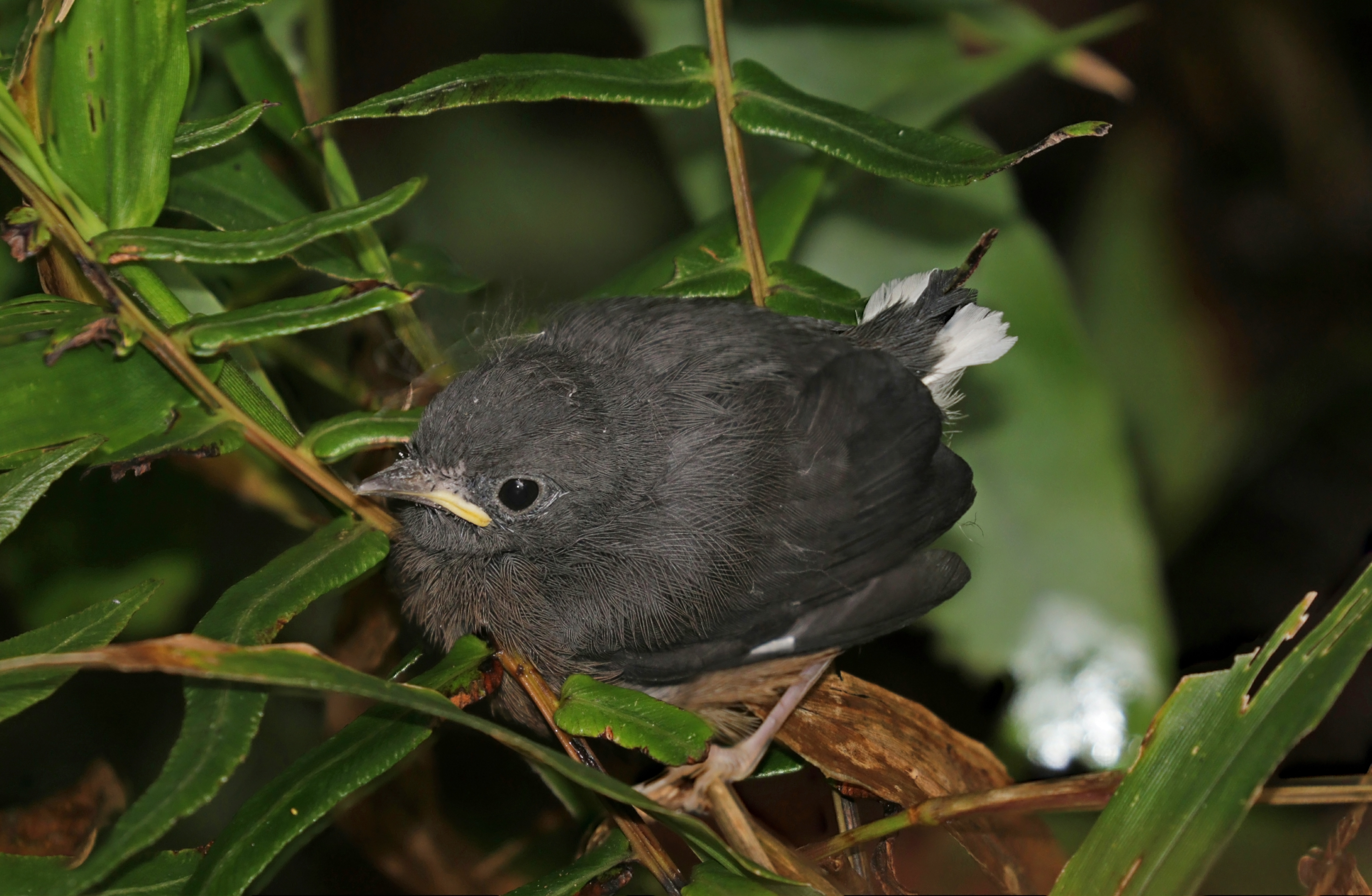
Juvenile M. m. aurantiacus

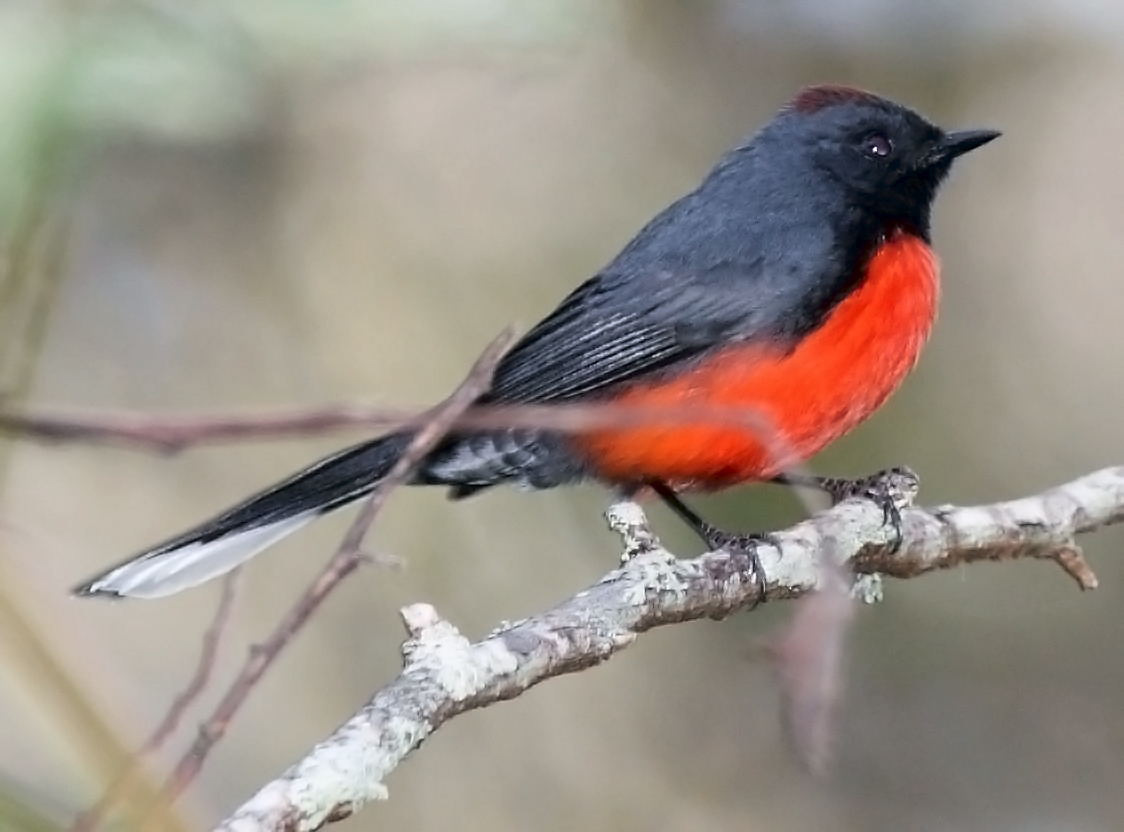
A red-bellied individual from the northern part of the range

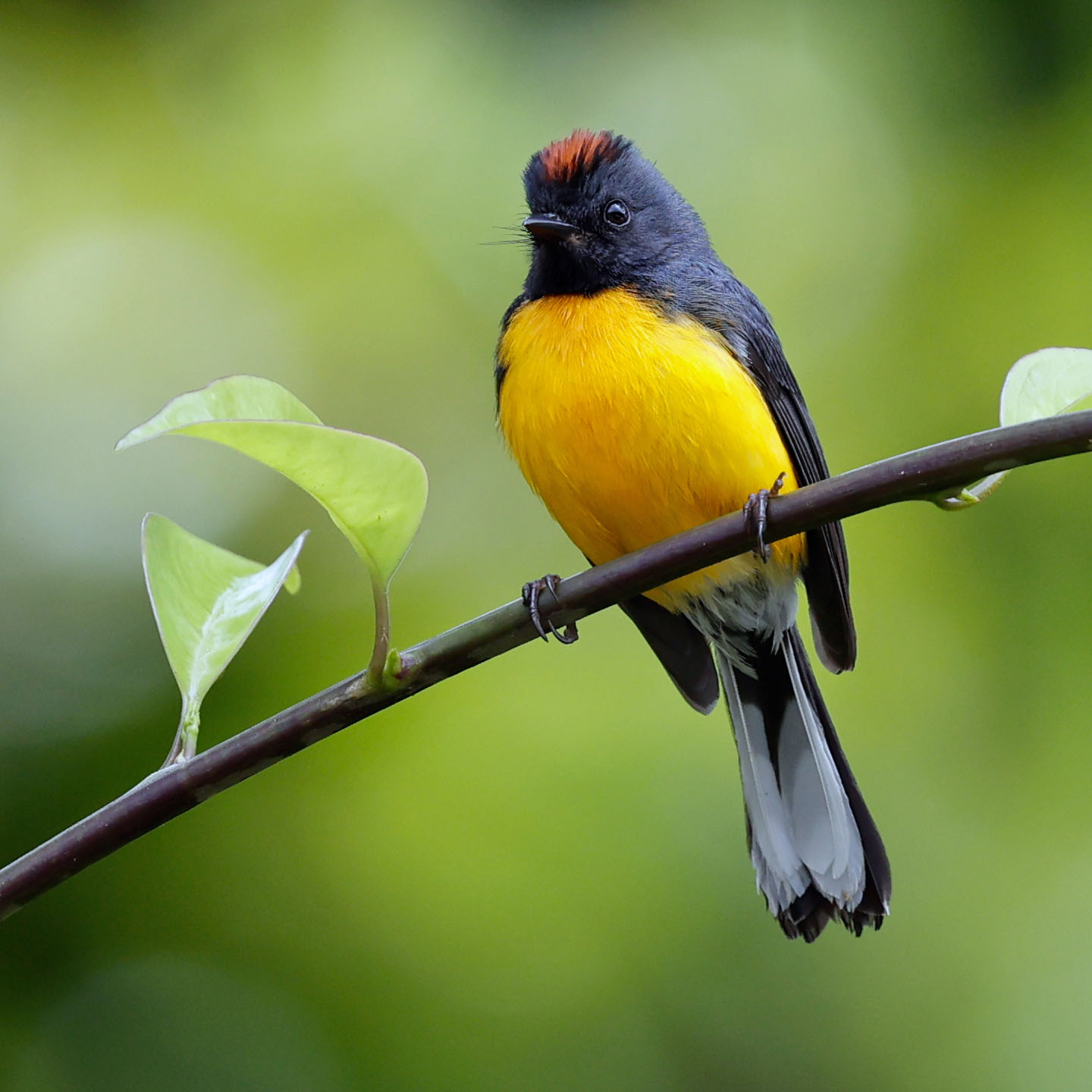
Adult near Tarcoles, Costa Rica, 18 March 2024
