= White-faced whitestart =

Conservation status
- Least Concern (IUCN 3.1)

Scientific classification
- Kingdom: Animalia
- Phylum: Chordata
- Class: Aves
- Order: Passeriformes
- Family: Parulidae
- Genus: Myioborus
- Species: M. albifacies

Binomial name
- Myioborus albifacies Phelps, WH & Phelps, WH Jr, 1946

Species of bird

The white-faced whitestart or white-faced redstart (Note: The North American and South American Classification Committees, and the Clements taxonomy which generally mirrors them, have long used "redstart". On July 25, 2026, the South American committee adopted a proposal to use "whitestart". As of that date the North American committee had a similar proposal pending.) (Myioborus albifacies) is a species of bird in the family Parulidae, the New World warblers. It is endemic to Venezuela.

== Taxonomy and systematics ==
The white-faced whitestart was formally described in 1946 with its current binomial Myioborus albifacies. It is monotypic.

== Description ==
The white-faced whitestart is about 13 cm (5.1 in) long. The sexes have the same plumage. Adults have a solid black forehead and crown and an otherwise white face. Their upperparts and wings are slate-gray. Their tail is black with much white on the outer two pairs of feathers. Their throat and most underparts are deep orange-yellow and their undertail coverts white. They have a dark iris, a blackish bill, and blackish legs and feet.

== Distribution and habitat ==
The white-faced whitestart is known only from three tepuis in the northwest of Venezuela's Amazonas state: Cerros Sipapo, Guanay, and Yaví. There it inhabits rainforest and cloudforest. In elevation it ranges between 900 and 1,600 m (3,000 and 5,200 ft) on Cerro Sipapo and between 1,700 and 2,250 m (5,600 and 7,400 ft) on the other two tepuis.

== Behavior ==
=== Movement ===
As far as is known, the white-faced whitestart is a sedentary year-round resident.

=== Feeding ===
Nothing is known about the white-faced whitestart's diet or foraging techniques. They are assumed to be similar to those of others of its genus; for example see here.

=== Breeding ===
Nothing is known about the white-faced whitestart's breeding biology. It is assumed to be similar to that of others of its genus; for example see here.

=== Vocalization ===
As of July 2026 neither xeno-canto nor the Cornell Lab's Macaulay Library had recordings of white-faced whitestart vocalizations.

== Status ==
The IUCN originally in 1988 assessed the white-faced whitestart as being of Least Concern, then in 1994 as Near Threatened, and since 2000 again as of Least Concern. It has a very small range; its population size is not known and is believed to be decreasing. "Owing to the largely inaccessible nature of the isolated tepuis region, its habitat remains relatively undisturbed. However, many of the endemic plants of the tepuis harbour flammable secondary compounds which help to spread fire and, given its relatively small range, this could affect available habitat." Many specimens have been taken, leading to the conclusion that the species is "probably fairly numerous". The three tepuis are closed to visitors so "it may not, therefore, be under any immediate threat".
