= White-fronted whitestart =

Conservation status
- Near Threatened (IUCN 3.1)

Scientific classification
- Kingdom: Animalia
- Phylum: Chordata
- Class: Aves
- Order: Passeriformes
- Family: Parulidae
- Genus: Myioborus
- Species: M. albifrons

Binomial name
- Myioborus albifrons (PL Sclater & Salvin, 1871)

Species of bird

The white-fronted whitestart or white-fronted redstart (Note: The North American and South American Classification Committees, and the Clements taxonomy which generally mirrors them, have long used "redstart". On July 25, 2026, the South American committee adopted a proposal to use "whitestart". As of that date the North American committee had a similar proposal pending.) (Myioborus albifrons) is a Near Threatened species of bird in the family Parulidae, the New World warblers. It is endemic to Venezuela.

== Taxonomy and systematics ==
The white-fronted whitestart was formally described in 1871 with the binomial Setophaga albifrons. It is monotypic.

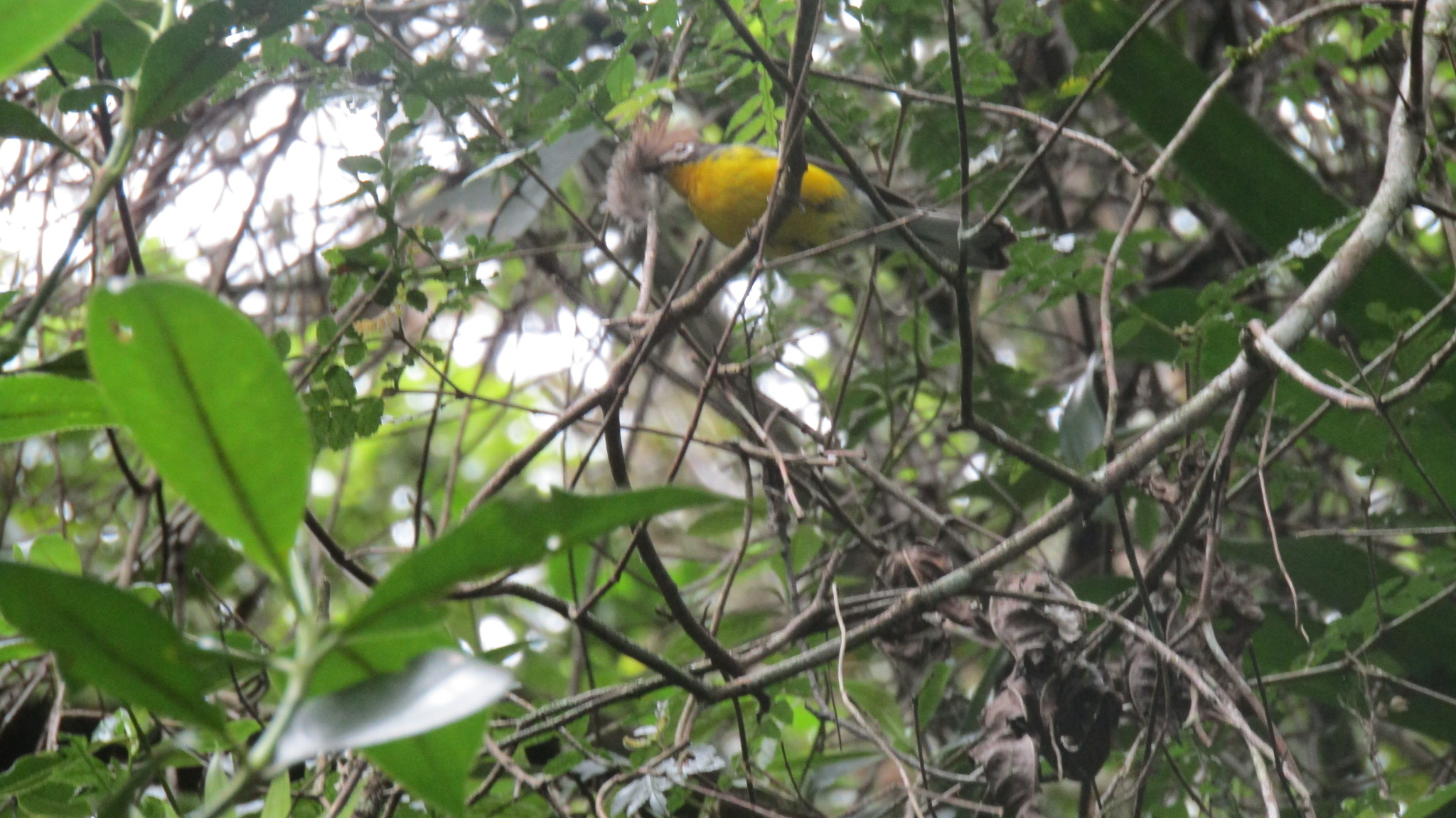
Adult

== Description ==
The white-fronted whitestart is 13 to 14 cm (5.1 to 5.5 in) long. The sexes have the same plumage. Adults have a white forehead ("front") whose color extends to the eye and with a white eye-ring forms "spectacles". They have a narrow orange-rufous patch in the center of the crown with a wide black band below it; the rest of their face is gray. Their upperparts and wings are gray. Their tail is black with white outer two pairs of feathers. Their throat and most underparts are yellow and their undertail coverts white. They have a dark iris, a blackish bill, and blackish legs and feet. Juveniles have an olive-gray head and upperparts, a pale buff-gray throat, mostly buff-gray underparts that are yellower on the belly, and whitish undertail coverts.

== Distribution and habitat ==
The white-fronted whitestart is native to the Cordillera de Mérida, where it inhabits the interior, edges, and clearings of wet montane forest heavy with mosses and epiphytes. In elevation it ranges between 2,200 and 3,200 m (7,200 and 10,500 ft).

== Behavior ==
=== Movement ===
The white-fronted whitestart is a sedentary year-round resident.

=== Feeding ===
The white-fronted whitestart feeds on insects and probably other arthropods. It forages mostly by gleaning in the forest's canopy and often takes prey in mid-air. While foraging it flicks its outer tail feathers, apparently to flush ("start") prey that it then acrobatically pursues. Pairs and family groups often lead mixed-species feeding flocks.

=== Breeding ===
The white-fronted whitestart's breeding season is not known, but recently fledged young have been seen in June. Nothing else is known about the species' breeding biology.

=== Vocalization ===
The white-fronted whitestart's song is "a cheerful, lively, rambling series, swit, swit, wesee, wasee, tsee, tsee, ree, ree, ree, sit, pee, pea, swit, swit... and so on, rising and falling in pitch and often continuing for nearly 30 seconds". Its call "a sharp, high tsip".

== Status ==
The IUCN originally in 1988 assessed the white-fronted whitestart as being of Least Concern but since 2004 as Near Threatened. It has a small range; its population size is not known but is believed to be stable. "Although some large tracts of forest remain within its limited range, deforestation has been locally severe in lower elevations, with logging continuing to expand to higher areas. Forests outside of protected areas are under pressure from human settlements and conversion for cattle-ranching and agricultural cultivation." It is considered fairly common.
