= Guaiquinima whitestart =

Conservation status
- Least Concern (IUCN 3.1)

Scientific classification
- Kingdom: Animalia
- Phylum: Chordata
- Class: Aves
- Order: Passeriformes
- Family: Parulidae
- Genus: Myioborus
- Species: M. cardonai

Binomial name
- Myioborus cardonai Zimmer, JT & Phelps, WH, 1945

Species of bird

The Guaiquinima whitestart (Myioborus cardonai), also known as the Guaiquinima redstart, saffron-breasted whitestart, or saffron-breasted redstart, is a species of bird in the family Parulidae, the New World warblers. It is endemic to Cerro Guaiquinima in eastern Venezuela.

== Taxonomy and systematics ==
The Guaiquinima whitestart was formally described in 1945 with its current binomial Myioborus cardonai. It is monotypic.

== Description ==
The Guaiquinima whitestart is about 13 cm (5.1 in) long. The sexes have the same plumage. Adults have a solid black forehead and crown and white crescents above and below the eye on otherwise slate-gray face. Their upperparts and wings are slate-gray. Their tail is black with much white on the outer two pairs of feathers. Their throat and most underparts are deep orange-yellow and their undertail coverts white. They have a dark iris, a blackish bill, and blackish legs and feet.

== Distribution and habitat ==
The Guaiquinima whitestart is known primarily from specimens taken on Cerro Guaiquinima, a tepui in the central part of Venezuela's Bolívar state. There it inhabits the interior and edges of cloudforest, gallery forest, and adjoining dense scrubby areas. In elevation it ranges between 1,200 and 1,700 m (3,900 and 5,600 ft).

== Behavior ==
=== Movement ===
As far as is known, the Guaiquinima whitestart is a sedentary year-round resident.

=== Feeding ===
Nothing is known about the Guaiquinima whitestart's diet or foraging techniques.

=== Breeding ===
Nothing is known about the Guaiquinima whitestart's breeding biology.

=== Vocalization ===
As of July 2026 neither xeno-canto nor the Cornell Lab's Macaulay Library had recordings of Guaiquinima whitestart vocalizations. However, its song is described as "a musical, high-pitched rapid, warble swelling in volume" that is typically sung in duet. Its call is "a high-pitched tsik".

== Status ==
The IUCN originally in 1988 assessed the Guaiquinima whitestart as being of Least Concern, then in 1994 as Vulnerable, in 2000 as Near Threatened, and since 2025 again as of Least Concern. It has a very small range; its population size is not known but is believed to be stable. "Within the range forest loss has been negligible in the ten years to 2023 with no change in the overall area of habitat between 2010 and 2020." Despite the lack of knowledge of the species in life, it is considered "probably fairly common". "Although there has been mining for many years at base of the mountain, this [is] thought not to have had significant impact, and no agriculture [is] within the species' range. In addition, wet climate and large river valleys surrounding the mountain make loss of habitat through fire fairly unlikely."
