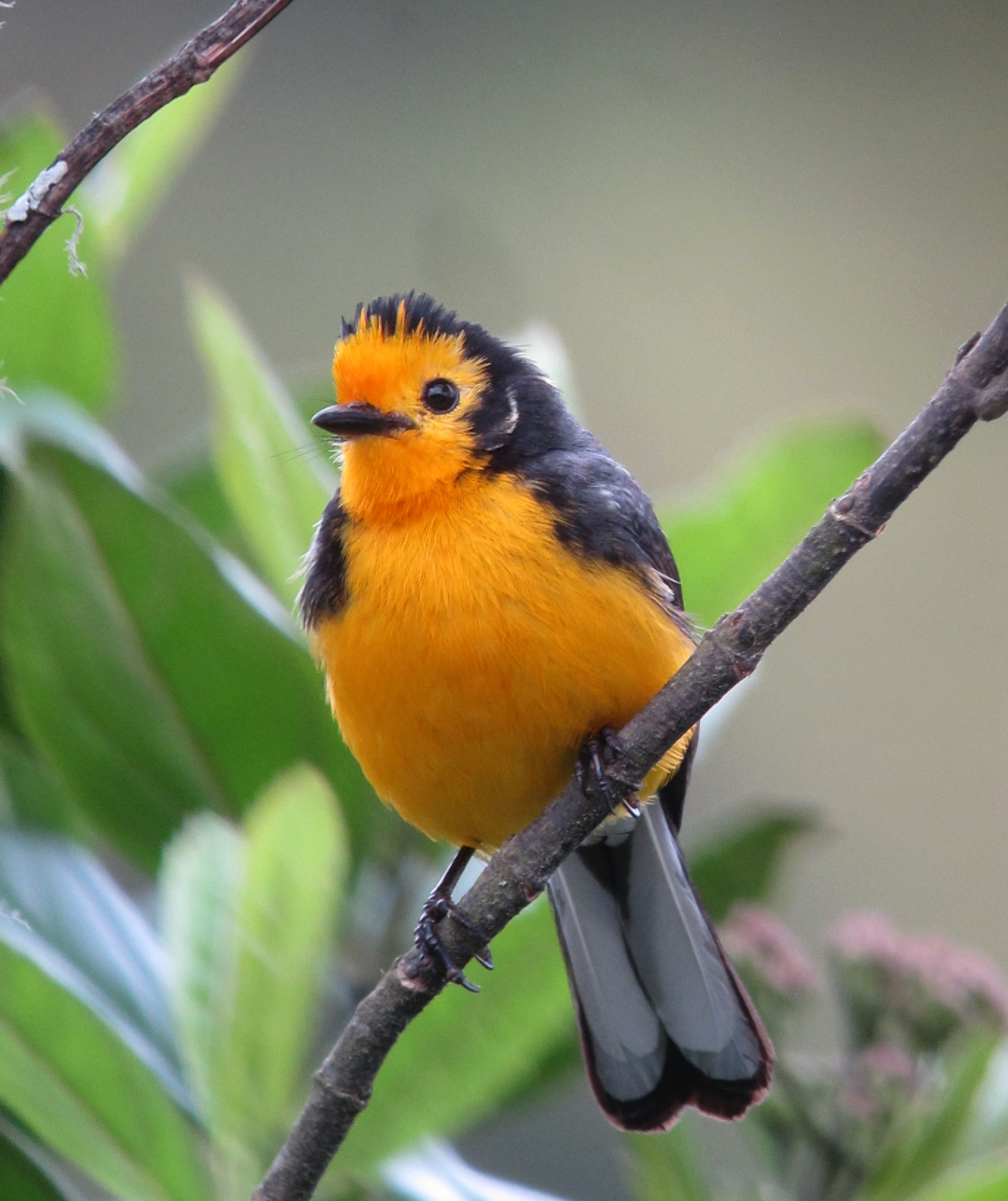
- M. o. chrysops at Manizales, Caldas Department, Colombia

Conservation status
- Least Concern (IUCN 3.1)

- Least Concern (IUCN 3.1)

Scientific classification
- Kingdom: Animalia
- Phylum: Chordata
- Class: Aves
- Order: Passeriformes
- Family: Parulidae
- Genus: Myioborus
- Species: M. ornatus

Binomial name
- Myioborus ornatus (Boissonneau, 1840)
- Range of M. ornatus

= Golden-fronted whitestart =

Species of bird

The golden-fronted whitestart, yellow-fronted whitestart, or golden-fronted redstart (Note: The North American and South American Classification Committees, and the Clements taxonomy which generally mirrors them, have long used "redstart". On July 25, 2026, the South American committee adopted a proposal to use "whitestart". As of that date the North American committee had a similar proposal pending.) (Myioborus ornatus) is a species of bird in the family Parulidae, the New World warblers. It is found in Colombia and Venezuela.

== Taxonomy and systematics ==
The white-fronted whitestart was formally described in 1840 with the binomial Setophaga ornata.

The species' further taxonomy is unsettled. Most systems assign it two subspecies, the nominate M. o. ornatus (Boissonneau, 1840) and M. o. chrysops (Salvin, 1878). However, in 2016 BirdLife International's Handbook of the Birds of the World (HBW) split them into separate species. Confusingly, HBW calls M. ornatus the "yellow-fronted whitestart" and M. chrysops the "golden-fronted whitestart".

This article follows the majority's one species, two subspecies model.

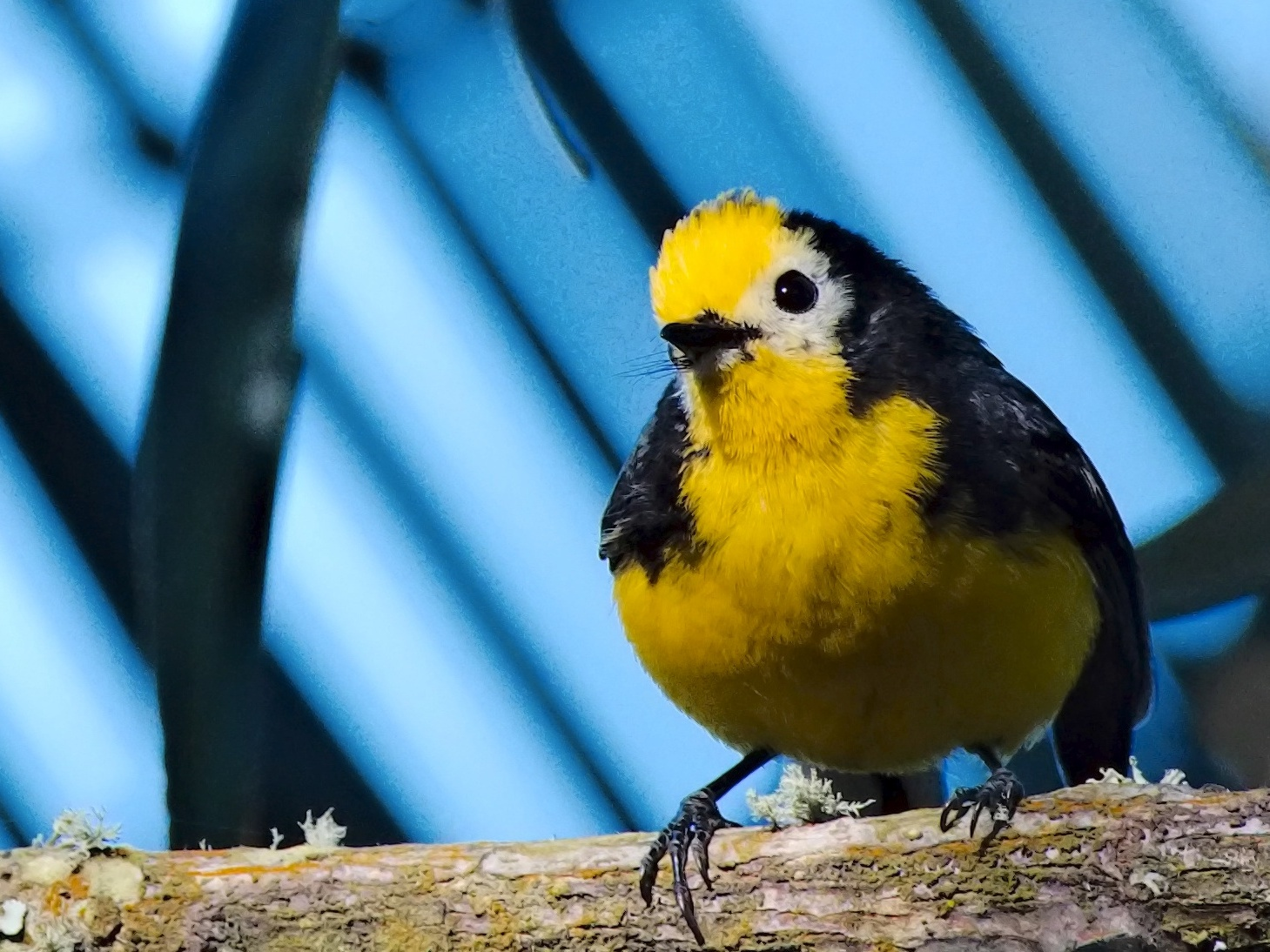
Golden-fronted whitestart ssp. M. o. ornatus

== Description ==
The golden-fronted whitestart is 13 to 13.5 cm (5.1 to 5.3 in) long; the nominate subspecies M. o. ornatus weighs about 11 to 13 g (0.39 to 0.46 oz). The sexes have the same plumage. Adults of the nominate subspecies have a bright yellow forehead and forecrown, a white face, and a blackish rear crown and rear sides of their head with a small white crescent on the ear coverts. Their upperparts and wings are gray. Their tail is blackish gray with white outer two pairs of feathers. Their throat and underparts are mostly bright yellow and their undertail coverts white. Subspecies M. o. chrysops has a richer golden-yellow forehead, throat, and underparts than the nominate, with less yellow on the forecrown and yellow instead of white on the face. Both subspecies have a dark brown iris, a blackish bill, and blackish legs and feet. Juveniles of both subspecies have an olive-tinged gray head and upperparts. Their throat and breast are brownish olive, their belly creamy yellowish, and their undertail coverts whitish.

== Distribution and habitat ==
The golden-fronted whitestart has a disjunct distribution. The nominate subspecies is found from south of the Uribante River in Venezuela's far southern Táchira state south along Colombia's Eastern Andes to the vicinity of Bogotá. Subspecies M. o. chrysops is found separately in the southern end of Colombia's Eastern Andes, in the Central Andes, and in the Western Andes. The species inhabits montane forest, cloudforest, and elfin forest in the temperate zone. Sources differ slightly about its elevational range. One states it is 1,800 to 3,400 m (5,900 to 11,200 ft) with most individuals above 2,400 m (7,900 ft). A Colombian field guide places it between 2,000 and 3,400 m (6,600 and 11,200 ft) in that country and a Venezuelan guide places it between 2,100 and 3,000 m (6,900 and 9,800 ft) there.

== Behavior ==
=== Movement ===
The golden-fronted whitestart is a sedentary year-round resident.

=== Feeding ===
The golden-fronted whitestart's diet has not been studied but is apparently arthropods. It forages mostly by gleaning from the forest's mid-lever to the canopy and often takes prey in mid-air. While foraging it flicks its outer tail feathers, apparently to flush ("start") prey that it then pursues. Pairs and family groups often lead mixed-species feeding flocks.

=== Breeding ===
The golden-fronted whitestart's breeding season has not been defined but appears to span at least March to July and possibly to November. Its nest has not been formally described but photographs show an open cup made from plant fibers and placed on the ground. Nothing else is known about the species' breeding biology.

=== Vocalization ===
The golden-fronted whitestart's song is a "sweet warbling phrase with a duration of about 3‒8s, starting very faint, gradually getting louder and ending abruptly". It sings mostly in the morning and year-round; pairs sometimes duet. Its call is a "short high-pitched steeply downslurred note tsit or tsip".

== Status ==
The IUCN follows HBW taxonomy and so has separately assessed ornatus and chrysops. Both are assessed as being of Least Concern. The population size of neither is known but both are believed to be stable. Both are threatened by logging, wood harvesting, and small-scale farming but the threats' severity is judged to produce only negligible declines. The species is considered common both in Colombia and in its small Venezuelan range. It occurs in several protected areas.
