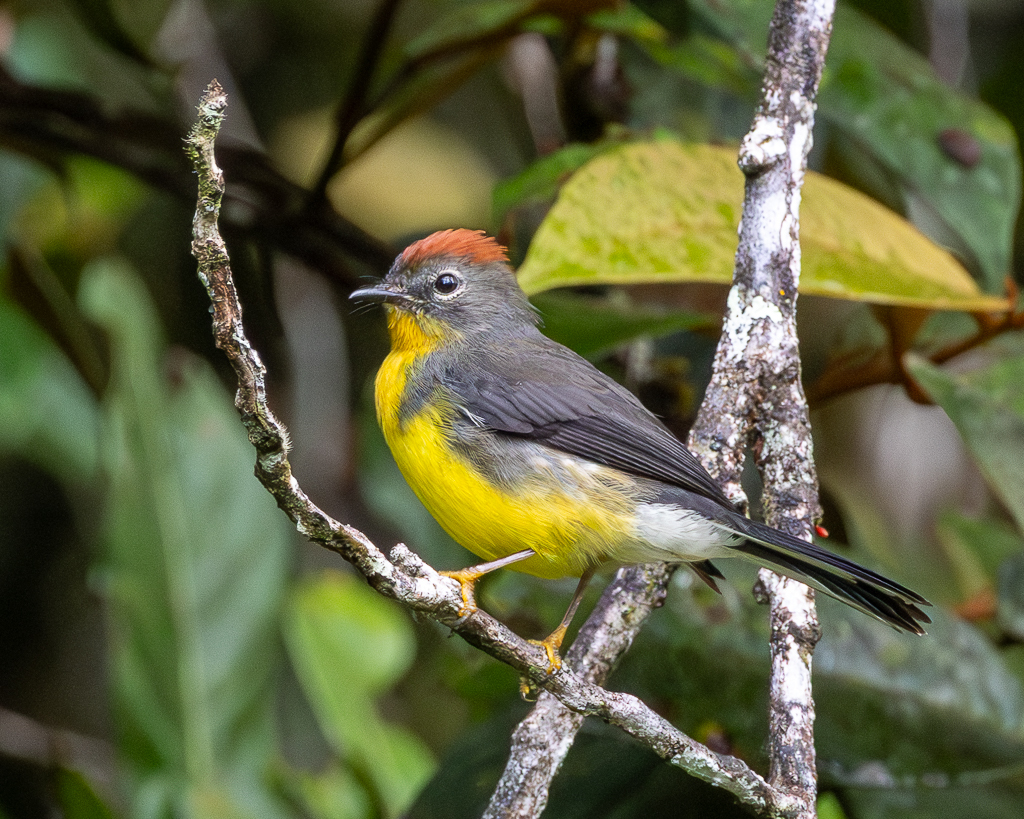

Conservation status
- Least Concern (IUCN 3.1)

Scientific classification
- Kingdom: Animalia
- Phylum: Chordata
- Class: Aves
- Order: Passeriformes
- Family: Parulidae
- Genus: Myioborus
- Species: M. castaneocapilla

Binomial name
- Myioborus castaneocapilla (Cabanis, 1849)

Synonyms
- See text

= Tepui whitestart =

Species of bird

The tepui whitestart or tepui redstart (Note: The North American and South American Classification Committees, and the Clements taxonomy which generally mirrors them, have long used "redstart". On July 25, 2026, the South American committee adopted a proposal to use "whitestart". As of that date the North American committee had a similar proposal pending.) (Myioborus castaneocapilla) is a species of bird in the family Parulidae, the New World warblers. It is found in Brazil, Guyana, and Venezuela.

== Taxonomy and systematics ==
The tepui whitestart was formally described in 1849 with the binomial Setophaga castaneocapilla.

The three subspecies of the tepui whitestart were previously considered subspecies of the brown-capped whitestart (M. brunniceps). The subspecies are:

- M. c. castaneocapilla (Cabanis, 1849)
- M. c. duidae Chapman, 1929
- M. c. maguirei Phelps, WH & Phelps, WH Jr, 1961

== Description ==
The tepui whitestart is about 13 cm (5.1 in) long and weighs 7.5 to 12 g (0.26 to 0.42 oz). The sexes have the same plumage. Adults of the nominate subspecies M. c. castaneocapilla have a mostly gray head with a rufous crown, a pale gray stripe above the lores, and thin white crescents above and below the eye. Their upperparts are gray with an olive tinge. Their wings are gray. Their tail is black with much white on the outer two pairs of feathers and a large white spot at the tip of the next pair inward. Their throat and most underparts are yellow and their undertail coverts white. Subspecies M. c. duidae is brighter overall than the other two subspecies. It has a whiter, more visible loral stripe, larger eye crescents, and purer gray upperparts than the nominate with rich orange-yellow underparts. M. c. maguirei has more conspicuous eye crescents and paler yellow underparts than the nominate. All subspecies have a dark iris, a blackish bill, and dusky gray to blackish legs and feet.

== Distribution and habitat ==
The tepui whitestart has a disjunct distribution in the tepui region where Venezuela, Guyana, and Brazil meet. The nominate subspecies is the most widespread. It is found from Auyán-tepui and Sierra de Lema in Venezuela's eastern Bolívar state east and south into western Guyana and extreme northern Brazil's Roraima state. Subspecies M. c. duidae is found on several Venezuelan tepuis in southern Bolívar and northern and central Amazonas state. M. c. maguirei is found only on Cerro de la Neblina, which is mostly in Venezuelan Amazonas and extends slightly into Brazil's Amazonas state. The species inhabits the edges and clearings of primary and secondary montane forest. In elevation it ranges between 1,200 and 2,200 m (3,900 and 7,200 ft).

== Behavior ==
=== Movement ===
The tepui whitestart is a sedentary year-round resident.

=== Feeding ===
The tepui whitestart feeds on insects and is assumed to also feed on other arthropods. Pairs forage mostly by gleaning from the forest's understory to its middle levels and often join mixed-species feeding flocks.

=== Breeding ===
Nothing is known about the tepui whitestart's breeding biology.

=== Vocalization ===
The tepui whitestart's song is "a thin, unmusical trill, accelerating towards [the end] while dropping in pitch" and its call "a fairly sharp tsip".

== Status ==
The IUCN has assessed the tepui whitestart as being of Least Concern. Its population size is not known and is believed to be decreasing. The primary potential threat is habitat alteration from climate change and severe weather. It is considered common in Venezuela.
