= Cerro Guanay =

- Location within Venezuela

Highest point
- Elevation: 2,300 m (7,500 ft)
- Coordinates: 5.85°N 66.40°W

Geography
- Country: Venezuela
- State: Bolivar
- Monumento Natural Cerro Guanay • Monumento Natural Tepui Guanay
- IUCN category III (natural monument or feature)
- Area: 1,348.09 km^{2} (520.50 sq mi)
- Designation: Natural Monument
- Designated: 1990
- Administrator: Instituto Nacional de Parques (INPARQUES)

Cerro Guanay is a tepui (table-top mountain) in southern Bolívar state of Venezuela. It extends up to approximately 2300 meters elevation.

Tepuis are isolated flat-topped sandstone mountains with a montane flora and fauna distinct from the surrounding lowlands. Cerro Guanay is home to many tepui-endemic species animals and plants. 19 species characteristic of the tepuis have been recorded there, including Chapman's bristle-tyrant (Pogonotriccus chapmani), Tepui wren (Troglodytes rufulus), Tepui brushfinch (Atlapetes personatus), flutist wren (Microcerculus ustulatus), buff-breasted sabrewing (Campylopterus duidae), olive manakin (Xenopipo uniformis), Tepui antpitta (Myrmothera simplex), golden-tufted grackle (Macroagelaius imthurni), velvet-browed brilliant (Heliodoxa xanthogonys), Tepui swift (Streptoprocne phelpsi), black-fronted tyrannulet (Phylloscartes nigrifrons), scaled flowerpiercer (Diglossa duidae), white-faced whitestart (Myioborus albifacies), scarlet-horned manakin (Ceratopipra cornuta), and peacock coquette (Lophornis pavoninus). Endemic plants include Bonnetia crassa, Kunhardtia rhodantha, Brocchinia melanacra, and Tepuipappus esposi, as well as species of Eriocaulaceae, Cyperaceae, and Xyridaceae.

The Venezuelan government designated Cerro Guanay a natural monument in 1990, which protects an area of 1348.09 km^{2}.
