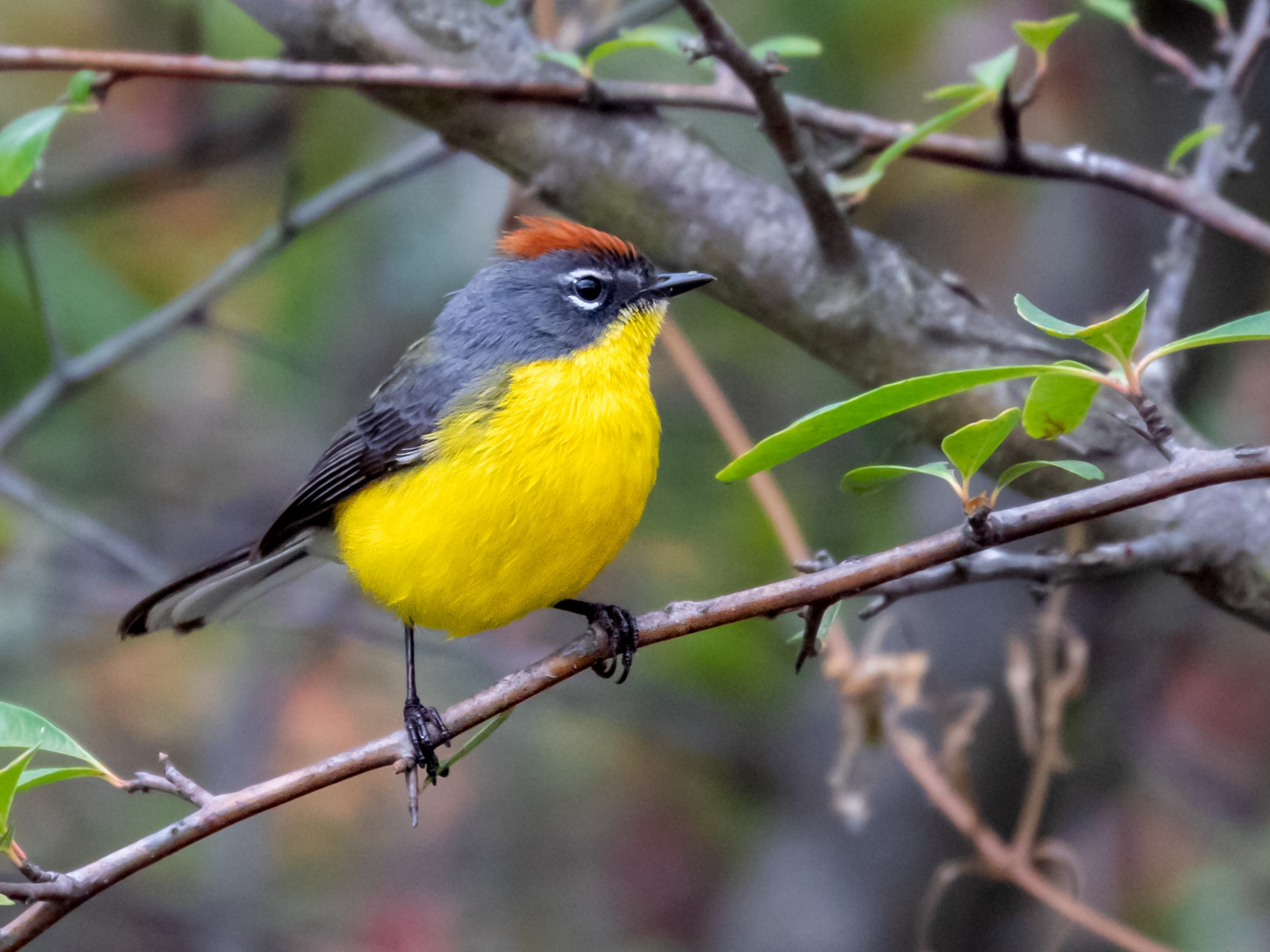

Conservation status
- Least Concern (IUCN 3.1)

Scientific classification
- Kingdom: Animalia
- Phylum: Chordata
- Class: Aves
- Order: Passeriformes
- Family: Parulidae
- Genus: Myioborus
- Species: M. brunniceps

Binomial name
- Myioborus brunniceps (Lafresnaye & D'Orbigny, 1837)

= Brown-capped whitestart =

Species of bird

The brown-capped whitestart or brown-capped redstart (Note: The North American and South American Classification Committees, and the Clements taxonomy which generally mirrors them, have long used "redstart". On July 25, 2026, the South American committee adopted a proposal to use "whitestart". As of that date the North American committee had a similar proposal pending.) (Myioborus brunniceps) is a species of bird in the family Parulidae, the New World warblers. It is found in Argentina and Bolivia.

== Taxonomy and systematics ==
The brown-capped whitestart was formally described in 1837 with the binomial Setophaga brunniceps.

The brown-capped whitestart is monotypic. What are now the three subspecies of the tepui whitestart (M. castaneocapilla) were previously considered subspecies of the brown-capped.

== Description ==
The brown-capped whitestart is about 13 cm (5.1 in) long and weighs 8.5 to 11 g (0.30 to 0.39 oz). The sexes have the same plumage. Adults have a mostly gray head with a rufous crown, a whitish stripe above the lores, and white crescents above and below the eye. Their upperparts and wings are mostly gray with an olive mantle. Their tail is black with much white on the outer feathers. Their throat and most underparts are yellow and their undertail coverts white. They have a dark iris, a blackish bill, and blackish legs and feet. Juveniles have a brownish gray head and upperparts, a buffy-brown throat and breast, and a pale yellow belly.

== Distribution and habitat ==
The brown-capped whitestart has a disjunct distribution. Its larger range is on the eastern slope of the Andes from central Bolivia's La Paz Department south into northern Argentina as far as La Rioja Province. A smaller separate range is further south in the Sierras de Córdoba. Some maps show its range as continuous. The species inhabits the edges and clearings of forest and woodlands and is also found in gardens. In Bolivia it is found mostly in dry deciduous forest but favors more humid landscapes in Argentina. In Argentina it also is found mostly in native forest during the breeding season and at lower elevations in plantations of non-native species in the non-breeding. In elevation it overall ranges mostly between 1,400 and 3,200 m (4,600 and 10,500 ft) but locally reaches 3,800 m (12,500 ft) in Bolivia. In Argentina it is most common between 1,400 and 1,700 m (4,600 and 5,600 ft) but occurs as low as 400 m (1,300 ft) in the non-breeding season.

== Behavior ==
=== Movement ===
The brown-capped whitestart makes elevational movements in Argentina, breeding at higher elevations and moving down after that season. Movements of up to 10 km (6 mi) have been documented.

=== Feeding ===
The brown-capped whitestart feeds on adult and larval insects, spiders, and other arthropods. It forages mostly by gleaning from the forest's understory to its middle levels. It sometimes joins mixed-species feeding flocks. Most Myioborus whitestarts flick the white of their tails to startle ("start") prey but the brown-capped seldom does so.

=== Breeding ===
The brown-capped whitestart breeds between September and January. Its nest is a ball with a side entrance. It is made from decaying plant matter, straw, and grass lined with finer material and is well hidden on the ground or in a small hollow in an earthen bank. The clutch size is not known. The incubation period is about 16 days and fledging occurs about 12 days after hatch. Details of parental care are not known.

=== Vocalization ===
The brown-capped whitestart's song is "a fast, high-pitched and sibilant trill on one pitch"; it has been written as "see-see-see-see-see-see-see-see-seep". Its calls include "a repeated check or tchip note, extended into monotone rattle when agitated, e.g. prprprprpr.....a shishishishi.....a pist..pist..psit...and a tsktsktsk", each of which appears to have a different function.

== Status ==
The IUCN has assessed the brown-capped whitestart as being of Least Concern. It has a large range; its population size is not known and is believed to be decreasing. No immediate threats have been identified. It is considered common throughout its range.
