= Golden-bellied warbler =

The golden-bellied warbler has been split into two species:

- Cuzco warbler, Myiothlypis chrysogaster
- Choco warbler, Myiothlypis chlorophrys
