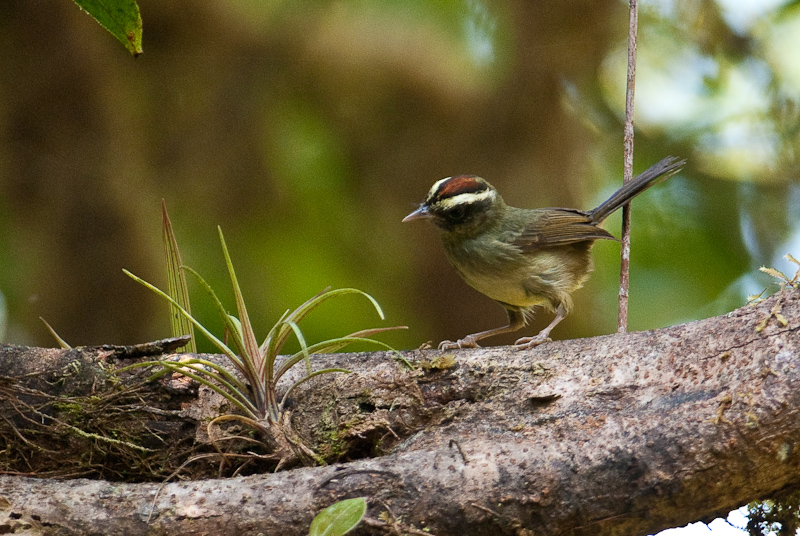

Conservation status
- Vulnerable (IUCN 3.1)

Scientific classification
- Kingdom: Animalia
- Phylum: Chordata
- Class: Aves
- Order: Passeriformes
- Family: Parulidae
- Genus: Basileuterus
- Species: B. ignotus

Binomial name
- Basileuterus ignotus Nelson, 1912

= Pirre warbler =

Species of bird

The Pirre warbler (Basileuterus ignotus) is a Vulnerable species of bird in the family Parulidae, the New World warblers. It is found in Colombia and Panama.

== Taxonomy and systematics ==
The Pirre warbler was formally described in 1912 as a subspecies of the black-cheeked warbler (B. melanogenys ignotus) with the English name "Mount Pirre warbler". It had been recognized as a species by the end of the twentieth century. The Pirre and black-cheeked warblers form a superspecies. The Pirre warbler is monotypic.

== Description ==
The Pirre warbler is about 13 cm (5.1 in) long and weighs 9.5 to 12.5 g (0.34 to 0.44 oz). The sexes have the same plumage. Adults have a rufous crown and a greenish yellow supercilium with a thin black line between them on an otherwise mottled olive and blackish face. Their nape, upperparts, wings, and tail are dull olive-green. Their throat and underparts are mostly pale creamy yellow with an olive tinge on the sides of the breast and on the flanks. They have a dark iris, a dusky pinkish bill with a blackish culmen, and pinkish legs and feet.

== Distribution and habitat ==
The Pirre warbler has a disjunct distribution. It is known only from Cerro Pirre in extreme eastern Panama and Cerro Tacarcuna that straddles the Panama-Colombia border. It inhabits the undergrowth of montane forest, especially elfin forest. Its lower elevation limit is 1,200 m (3,900 ft); it reaches 1,400 m (4,600 ft) in Colombia but in Panama is found mostly above 1,400 m (4,600 ft).

== Behavior ==
=== Movement ===
The Pirre warbler is a sedentary year-round resident.

=== Feeding ===
The Pirre warbler feeds primarily on insects and other arthropods. Pairs or small family groups forage from the forest's understory to its mid-level, taking most food by gleaning from vegetation. It sometimes joins mixed-species feeding flocks.

=== Breeding ===
Adult Pirre warblers have been observed feeding recently fledged young in July. Nothing else is known about the species' breeding biology.

=== Vocalization ===
The Pirre warbler's song has not been described. Its call is "a distinctive, penetrating tseeut or tseeit."

== Status ==
The IUCN originally in 1994 assessed the Pirre warbler as Near Threatened and since 2000 as Vulnerable. It has a very small range; its estimated population of between 650 and 6500 mature individuals is believed to be stable. "Its small range puts it at inherent risk from any habitat loss or degradation. Habitat in the region is being cleared and degraded for mining, agriculture and cultivation of coca, but probably not yet within the altitudinal range of this species...As the species inhabits a very small area near the top of two mountain ranges, it may be vulnerable to global climate change and related range shifts." It is considered overall "generally uncommon" and "very local" in Colombia. "Most of its range lies within Darién National Park, but completion of the Pan American Highway through this area would lead to further damage and destruction of forests."
