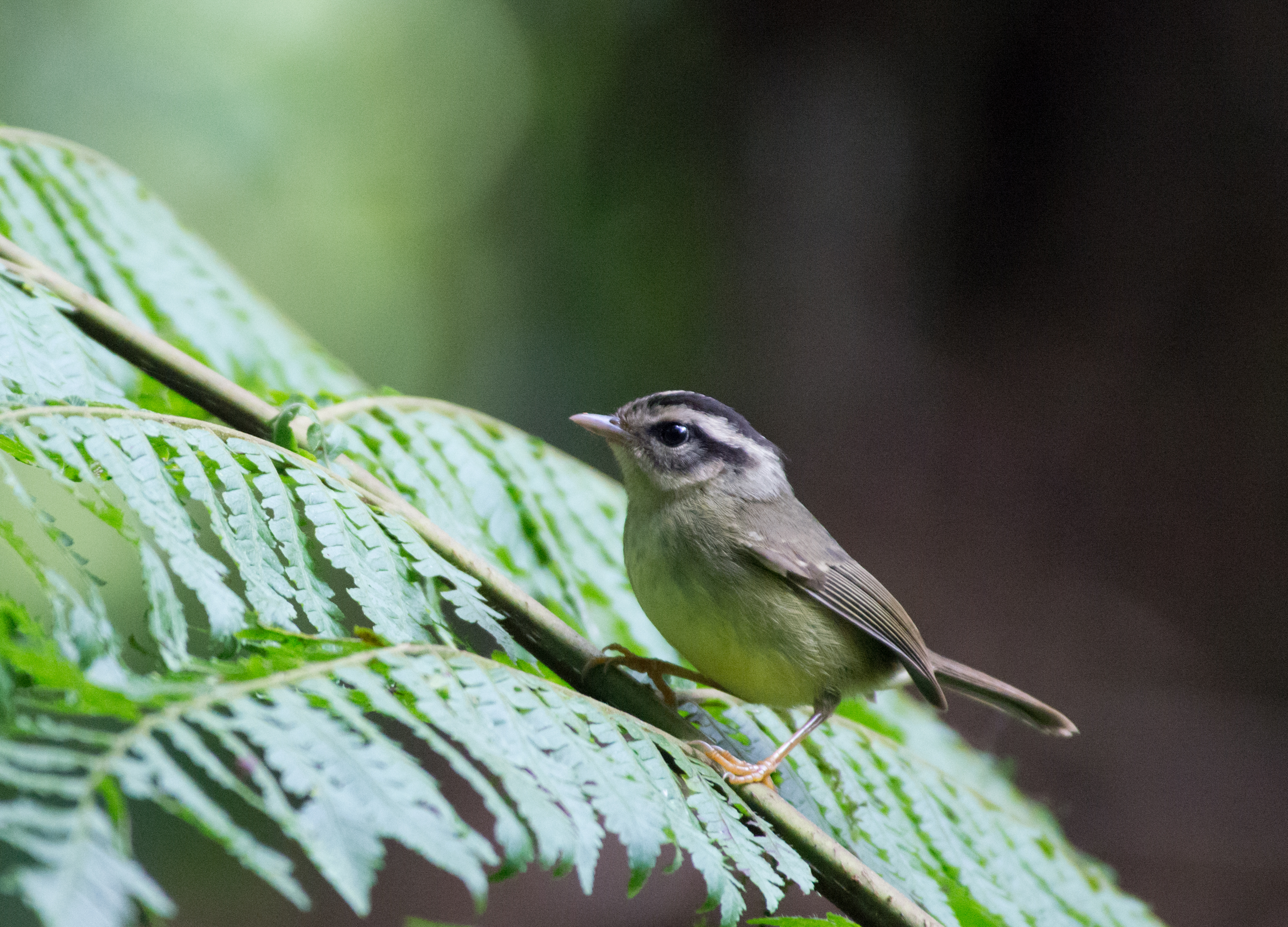

Conservation status
- Least Concern (IUCN 3.1)

Scientific classification
- Kingdom: Animalia
- Phylum: Chordata
- Class: Aves
- Order: Passeriformes
- Family: Parulidae
- Genus: Basileuterus
- Species: B. melanotis

Binomial name
- Basileuterus melanotis Lawrence, 1868

= Black-eared warbler =

Species of bird

The black-eared warbler or Costa Rican warbler (Basileuterus melanotis) is a species of bird in the family Parulidae, the New World warblers. It is found in Costa Rica and Panama.

== Taxonomy and systematics ==
The black-eared warbler was formally described in 1868 with its current binomial Basileuterus melanotis. For much of the twentieth century it was treated as a subspecies of the three-striped warbler (M. tristriatus). It and other subspecies were recognized as full species based on studies published in 2012 and 2014.

The black-eared warbler is monotypic.

== Description ==
The black-eared warbler is about 13 cm (5.1 in) long. The sexes have the same plumage. Adults have a buff-orange crown stripe, a long and wide black stripe below it, and a long pale grayish white supercilium with a buff tinge below that. Their lores and ear coverts are blackish and they have a pale buffy white arc under the eye. Their ear coverts have pale yellow bottom and rear edges. Their upperparts, wings, and tail are olive-gray. Their throat is whitish that becomes mostly pale olive-buff on the breast and a yellower olive-buff on the belly. The sides of their breast and their flanks have an olive-gray wash. Juveniles have a dusky olive-brown head with a hint of the adult's pattern. Their upperparts are dusky olive-brown; their greater and median upperwing coverts have buffy tips that show as two faint wing bars. Their underparts are mostly dusky brown with a paler buffish brown belly.

== Distribution and habitat ==
The black-eared warbler is found from the Cordillera de Tilarán in Costa Rica's Alajuela Province south through the Corillera Central and Cordillera de Talamanca into western Panama as far as Veraguas Province. It inhabits primary and mature secondary montane evergreen forest in the upper tropical and subtropical zones. In elevation it ranges between 800 and 2,500 m (2,600 and 8,200 ft) overall and between 1,000 and 2,200 m (3,300 and 7,200 ft) in Costa Rica.

== Behavior ==
=== Movement ===
The black-eared warbler is a year-round resident.

=== Feeding ===
The black-eared warbler's diet has not been studied but is thought to be primarily or solely invertebrates. Pairs or small family groups forage actively in the forest's understory, taking most food by gleaning from vegetation. It also takes prey in mid-air with short sallies.

=== Breeding ===
One nest of the black-eared warbler has been found. It was a globe with a side entrance placed on the ground and held three nestlings. The nest cup was made from grasses and moss and the roof from grasses, moss, and fern leaves. The cup was lined with thinner grass, leaves, and other plant materials. Nothing else is known about the species' breeding biology, though it is assumed to be similar to that of the three-striped warbler, which see here.

=== Vocalization ===
The black-eared warbler's song is "a mixture of agitated trills, twitters, warbles and buzzy notes...a rushing series of chipping or tsitting twitters". Its calls include "a variety of tip, tsip, or sharp pst" notes.

== Status ==
The IUCN has assessed the black-eared warbler as being of Least Concern. It has a restricted range; its population size is not known and is believed to be decreasing. "The only known threat to the species is slow, but ongoing habitat destruction for the expansion of small-scale agriculture and logging." It is considered "generally common to uncommon in appropriate habitat" and occurs in both private and public protected areas.
