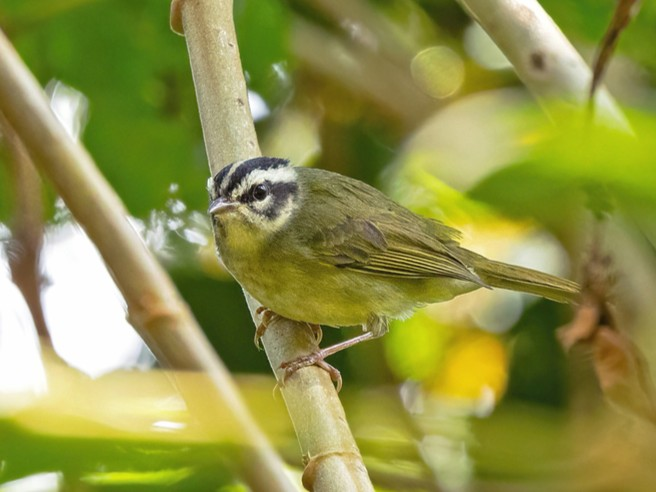

Conservation status
- Least Concern (IUCN 3.1)

Scientific classification
- Kingdom: Animalia
- Phylum: Chordata
- Class: Aves
- Order: Passeriformes
- Family: Parulidae
- Genus: Basileuterus
- Species: B. punctipectus

Binomial name
- Basileuterus punctipectus Chapman, 1924

= Yungas warbler =

Species of bird

The Yungas warbler (Basileuterus punctipectus) is a species of bird in the family Parulidae, the New World warblers. It is found in Bolivia and Peru.

== Taxonomy and systematics ==
The Yungas warbler was formally described in 1924 as a subspecies of the three-striped warbler with the trinomial Basileuterus tristriatus punctipectus. It was recognized as a full species based on studies published in 2012 and 2014. But as of early 2026 the South American Classification Committee had not implemented the split.

The Yungas warbler's further taxonomy is unsettled. Most taxonomic systems recognize these three subspecies:

- B. p. inconspicuus Zimmer, JT, 1949
- B. p. punctipectus Chapman, 1924
- B. p. canens Zimmer, JT, 1949

However, as of late 2025 BirdLife International's Handbook of the Birds of the World recognized only punctipectus, treating the Yungas warbler as monotypic.

This article follows the majority three-subspecies model.

== Description ==
Male and female Yungas warblers have the same plumage. Adults of the nominate subspecies B. p. punctipectus have an olive-buff crown stripe that becomes buff gray on the nape, a long and wide black stripe below it, and a long white supercilium with a buff tinge below that. Their lores and ear coverts are black and they have a white crescent under the eye. Their cheeks are white and blend rearward to a small buffy spot behind the ear coverts. Their upperparts are olive gray. Their wings are dark brown with olive leading edges on the flight feathers and coverts. Their tail is dark brown with pale olive edges near the bases of the feathers. Their throat is whitish that becomes mostly yellow on the breast and belly. Their breast is mottled with olive gray. The sides of their breast and their flanks are pale olive gray and their undertail coverts yellowish gray. Subspecies B. p. inconspicuus has a slightly paler and whiter throat than the nominate with little or no mottling on the breast. B. p. canens has a whiter crown stripe, grayer upperparts, and whiter underparts than the nominate with less mottling on the breast. All subspecies have a dark iris, a horn-colored bill with a darker culmen, and pinkish to yellowish brown legs and feet.

== Distribution and habitat ==
Subspecies B. p. inconspicuus of the Yungas warbler is the most northerly of the three. It is found in the Andes from southeastern Peru's Department of Puno into northwestern Bolivia's La Paz Department. The nominate subspecies is found in central Bolivia's Cochabamba Department. Subspecies B. p. canens is found in eastern Bolivia's Santa Cruz Department. The species inhabits humid to wet primary and secondary forest from the foothills to cloudforest. It mostly ranges in elevation between 800 and 2,550 m (2,600 and 8,400 ft) but the nominate is thought to range up to 3,000 m (9,800 ft).

== Behavior ==
=== Movement ===
The Yungas warbler is a year-round resident.

=== Feeding ===
The Yungas warbler's diet has not been studied but is thought to be primarily invertebrates. Pairs or small family groups forage in the forest's understory, taking most food by gleaning from vegetation. It regularly joins mixed-species feeding flocks.

=== Breeding ===
The Yungas warbler's breeding season has not been defined but appears to span at least August to November. The one known nest was a domed cup with a side entrance. It was made from moss, rootlets, and plant fibers lined with moss and seed down. It held two nestlings. Nothing else is known about the species' breeding biology.

=== Vocalization ===
One song of the Yungas warbler is a "gradually rising series of notes followed by a short stutter or short scratchy warble". It is often answered in duet by a "gradually descending series of staccato notes". Its calls include a "short, high-pitched tsip" and a seldom-heard "rather low-pitched buzzy underslurred tzreep".

== Status ==
The IUCN has assessed the Yungas warbler as being of Least Concern. Its population size is not known and is believed to be decreasing. "Threats to the species include deforestation for the expansion of small-scale agriculture, plantations, timber harvesting and road construction." It is considered fairly common in Bolivia and each subspecies occurs in at least one protected area.
