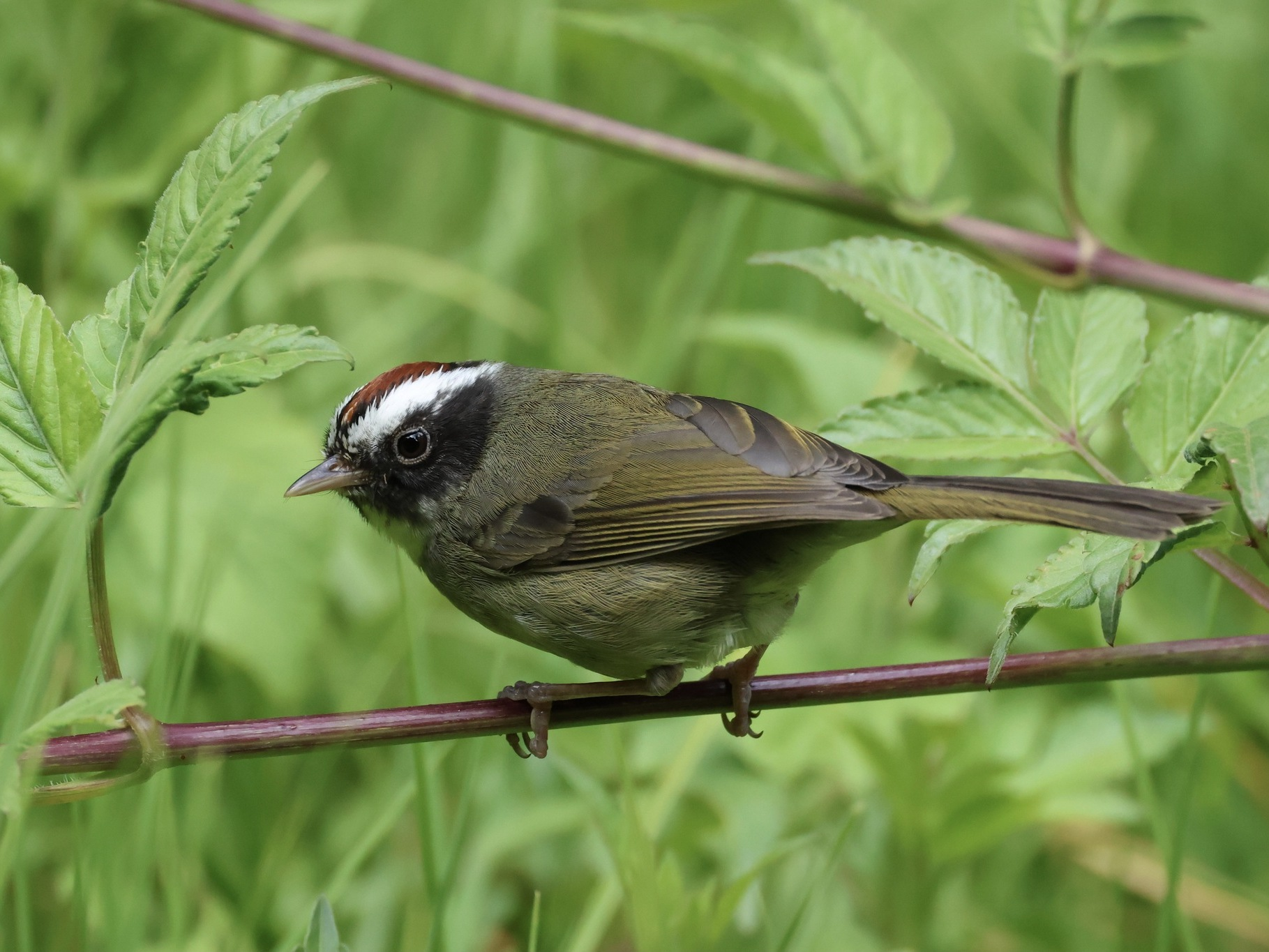

Conservation status
- Least Concern (IUCN 3.1)

Scientific classification
- Kingdom: Animalia
- Phylum: Chordata
- Class: Aves
- Order: Passeriformes
- Family: Parulidae
- Genus: Basileuterus
- Species: B. melanogenys

Binomial name
- Basileuterus melanogenys Baird, 1865
- Range of B. melanogenys

= Black-cheeked warbler =

Species of bird

The black-cheeked warbler (Basileuterus melanogenys) is a species of bird in the family Parulidae, the New World warblers. It is found in Costa Rica and Panama.

== Taxonomy and systematics ==
The black-cheeked warbler was formally described in 1865 with its current binomial Basileuterus melanogenys. It has these three subspecies:

- B. m. melanogenys Baird, 1865
- B. m. eximius Nelson, 1912
- B. m. bensoni Griscom, 1927

What is now the Pirre warbler (M. ignotus) was originally described as another subspecies of the black-cheeked warber; they form a superspecies.

== Description ==
The black-cheeked warbler is about 13.5 cm (5.3 in) long and weighs an average of about 12 g (0.42 oz). The sexes have the same plumage. Adults of the nominate subspecies B. m. melanogenys have a chestnut crown, a white or pale yellowish supercilium, and a thin black line between them on an otherwise blackish face. The sides of their nape are sooty blackish and the rest of the nape is dark brownish gray or olive. Their back, wings, and tail are dusky brownish gray and their rump and uppertail coverts are olive. Their throat is whitish, their breast grayish, their flanks olive, and the center of their belly and their undertail coverts are buffy white. Juveniles have a sooty brown head with an olive-tinged supercilium. Their upperparts are browner than their head; their greater and median upperwing coverts have buffy tips that show as two wing bars. Their underparts are mostly pale yellowish with a brownish wash on the breast, sides, and flanks. Subspecies B. m. eximius has paler and grayer upperparts than the nominate with paler and more whitish underparts and grayer flanks. B. m. bensoni has gray upperparts and a darker breast and whiter rest of the underparts than the nominate. All subspecies have a dark brown iris, a dusky black maxilla, a pink mandible, and pale brownish white legs and feet.

== Distribution and habitat ==
The black-cheeked warbler has a disjunct distribution that the map does not well portray. The nominate subspecies is found separately in central Costa Rica's Cordillera Central and Cordillera de Talamanca in the south. Subspecies B. m. eximius has a limited range south of the nominate in the vicinity of Boquete in western Panama's central Chiriquí Province. B. m. bensoni also has a limited range in the vicinity of Chitra in Panama's Veraguas Province.

The black-cheeked warbler inhabits the understory of montane evergreen forest, elfin forest, and secondary forest in the subtropical and temperate zones. It "prefers bamboo-choked ravines and understory of oak forest". It shuns clearings and pastures. In Costa Rica it ranges in elevation from 1,600 m (5,200 ft) to above timberline, which is at about 3,500 m (11,500 ft).

== Behavior ==
=== Movement ===
The black-cheeked warbler is a sedentary year-round resident.

=== Feeding ===
The black-cheeked warbler's diet has not been studied but is known to be primarily insects and other arthropods with small amounts of berries. Pairs or small family groups acrobatically forage from the forest's understory to its mid-level, taking most food by gleaning from vegetation. It regularly joins mixed-species feeding flocks but usually for only a short time.

=== Breeding ===
The black-cheeked warbler breeds between April and June. Its nest is oven-shaped, built from plant fibers, and placed on the ground or an earthen bank. Its eggs are glossy white with cinnamon rufous flecks and speckles. The clutch size, incubation period, time to fledging, and details of parental care are not known.

=== Vocalization ===
The black-cheeked warbler's song is "a slight, lisping, sputtering jumble of notes tsi tsi wee tsi tsi wu tsi wee". Its calls are "a high, thin tsit" that in alarm becomes "a sputter, followed by a thin whistle: t-t-t-tew". It also makes a "high pit-tew" call.

== Status ==
The IUCN has assessed the black-cheeked warbler as being of Least Concern. It has a restricted range; its estimated population of at least 20,000 mature individuals is believed to be decreasing. No immediate threats have been identified. It is considered fairly common in Costa Rica. "Its sensitivity to habitat modification is estimated to be 'medium'."
