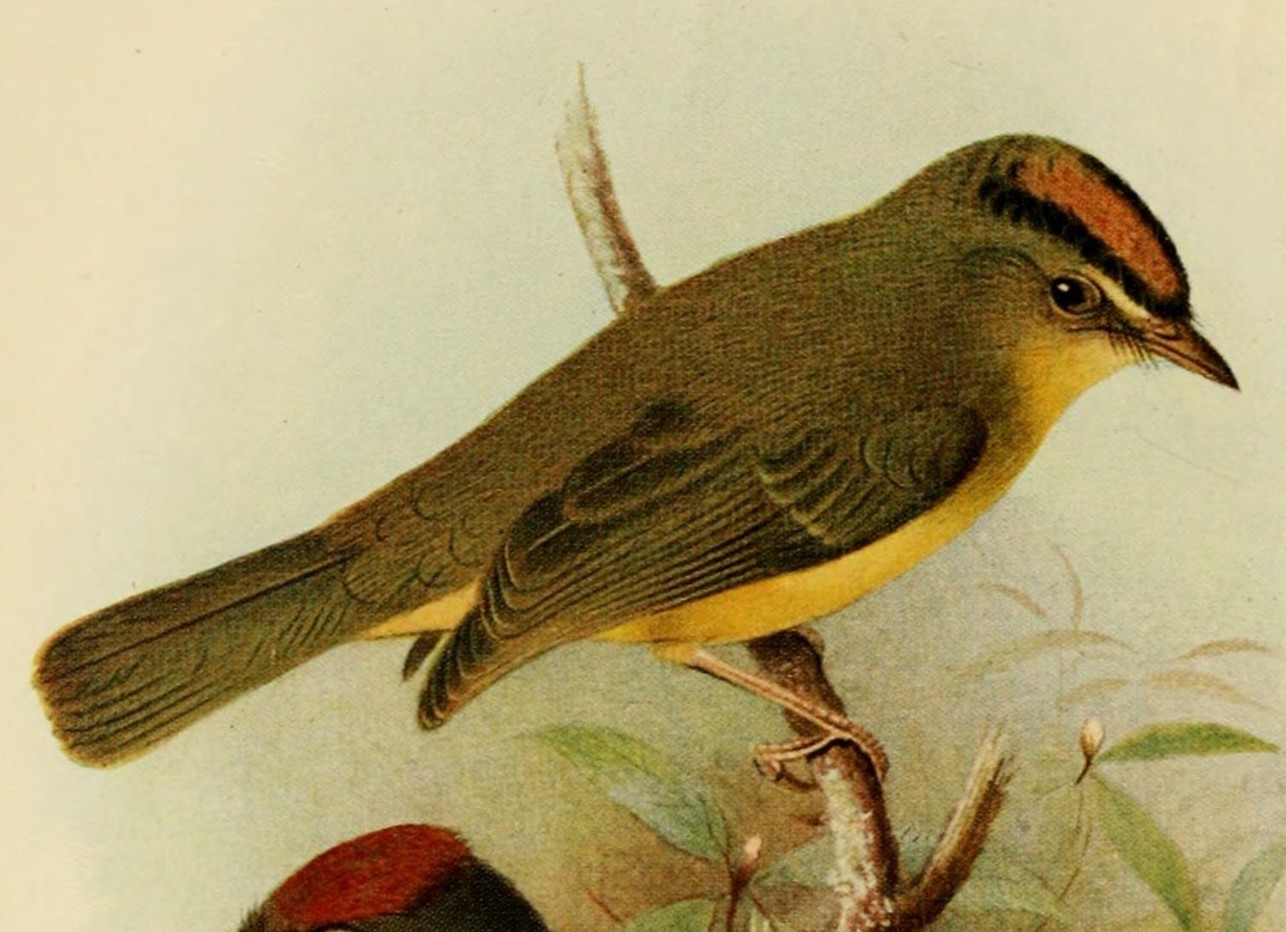

Conservation status
- Least Concern (IUCN 3.1)

Scientific classification
- Kingdom: Animalia
- Phylum: Chordata
- Class: Aves
- Order: Passeriformes
- Family: Parulidae
- Genus: Myiothlypis
- Species: M. roraimae

Binomial name
- Myiothlypis roraimae (Sharpe, 1885)

Synonyms
- Myiothlypis bivittata roraimae

= Roraiman warbler =

Species or subspecies of bird

The Roraiman warbler (Myiothlypis roraimae) is a passerine bird in the new world warbler family Parulidae. It is found in Brazil, Guyana, and Venezuela. Taxonomic systems are divided on whether it is a species or subspecies.

== Taxonomy and systematics ==
The Roraiman warbler was formally described in 1885 with the binomial Basileuterus roraimae. By 2007 taxonomic systems had begun to resurrect genus Myiothlypis, which had been erected in 1850, for the two-banded warbler and many other species.

At that time the Roraiman warbler was treated as one of three subspecies of the two-banded warbler (M. bivittata). In 2014 the IOC split the Roraiman warbler as a species and retained the English name "two-banded warbler" for the other two subspecies. BirdLife International's Handbook of the Birds of the World (HBW) did the same in 2016. Several studies support this split.

However, as of early 2026 AviList, the Clements taxonomy, and the South American Classification Committee retain the three-subspecies model of the two-banded warbler. AviList states that "Taxon roraimae is retained within Myiothlypis bivittata. These taxa are highly divergent based on analysis of mitochondrial DNA and have very different songs but a split is deferred pending publication of current research." Clements recognizes these differences within the species, somewhat mirroring the IOC and HBW names by calling roraimae the "two-banded warbler (Roraiman)" and grouping bivittata plus argentinae as the "two-banded warbler (two-banded)".

Further information about the Roraiman warbler including description, range, habitat, behavior, and IUCN status are included in the two-banded warbler article.
