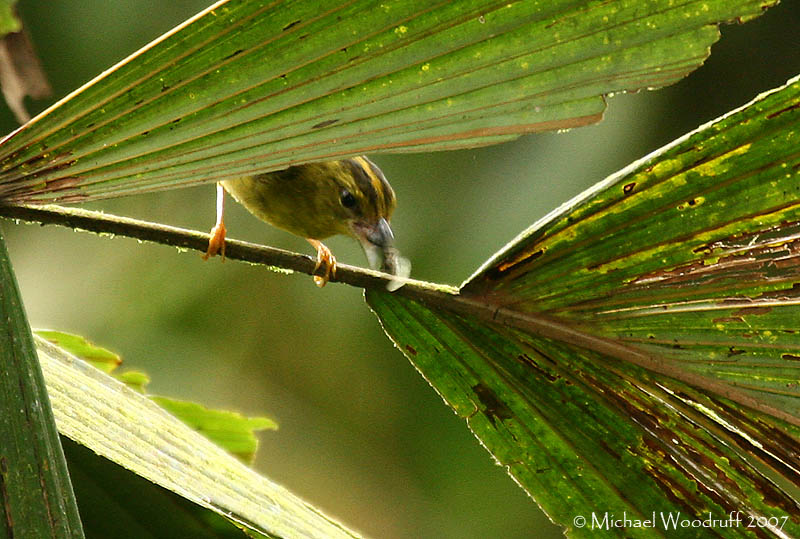

Conservation status
- Least Concern (IUCN 3.1)

Scientific classification
- Kingdom: Animalia
- Phylum: Chordata
- Class: Aves
- Order: Passeriformes
- Family: Parulidae
- Genus: Myiothlypis
- Species: M. chlorophrys

Binomial name
- Myiothlypis chlorophrys (Berlepsch, 1907)

= Choco warbler =

Golden-bellied warbler

Species of bird

The Choco warbler (Myiothlypis chlorophrys) is a species of bird in the family Parulidae, the New World warblers. It is found in Colombia and Ecuador.

== Taxonomy and systematics ==
The Choco warbler was formally described in 1907 as a subspecies of the two-banded warbler with the trinomial Basileuterus bivittatus chlorophrys. At some time in the twentieth century it was reassigned as a subspecies of what was then called the golden-bellied warbler (Basileuterus chrysogaster). By 2007 taxonomic systems had begun to resurrect genus Myiothlypis, which had been erected in 1850, for chrysogaster and many other species.

The above assignment lasted into the twentieth century. By 2012 the IOC had split the golden-bellied warbler into the Choco warbler and the Cuzco warbler; the latter retained the binomial Myiothlypis chrysogaster. BirdLife International's Handbook of the Birds of the World (HBW) did the same in 2016, though it kept the name "golden-bellied" warbler for chrysogaster until 2024. The Clements taxonomy adopted the split in 2022. However, as of February 2026 the South American Classification Committee retained the two-subspecies golden-bellied warbler.

This article follows the majority one-subspecies model.

== Description ==
The Choco warbler is 11.5 to 13 cm (4.5 to 5.1 in) long. The sexes have the same plumage. Adults have an orange crown stripe with thin blackish borders, a yellow spot above the lores, a pale olive supercilium, and a dark line through the eye. Their nape and upperparts are olive. Their throat and underparts are mostly olive-yellow with a much olive on the sides of the breast and the flanks. They have a dark iris, a blackish gray bill, and yellowish or straw legs and feet.

== Distribution and habitat ==
The Choco warbler is found in the foothills of the western slope in Colombia's Western Andes from Antioquia Department and south through Ecuador's Andes to southern Los Ríos and Bolívar provinces. It primarily inhabits the interior and edges of humid primary and secondary lowland and submontane forest. In elevation it ranges between 300 and 1,000 m (1,000 and 3,300 ft) in Colombia and between 400 and 1,200 m (1,300 and 3,900 ft) in Ecuador.

== Behavior ==
=== Movement ===
The Choco warbler is a sedentary year-round resident.

=== Feeding ===
The Choco warbler's diet has not been studied but is believed to be mostly or entirely invertebrates. Pairs and family groups usually forage from the forest's mid-level to its subcanopy. The species mostly gleans its prey from vegetation and branches. It often joins mixed-species feeding flocks.

=== Breeding ===
The Choco warbler has a long breeding season; evidence suggests it spans at least from October to early June. Nothing else is known about the species' breeding biology.

=== Vocalization ===
The Choco warbler's "[f]requently heard and distinctive song [is] a very thin, wiry, and buzzy t-t-t-t-tzzzzzzzzzzz". Its calls include a "short high-pitched tsee note" and a "peculiar rough-sounding burry rrweet".

== Status ==
The IUCN has assessed the Cuzco warbler as being of Least Concern. Its population size is not known and is believed to be decreasing. No immediate threats have been identified. It is considered uncommon in Colombia and locally common in Ecuador.
