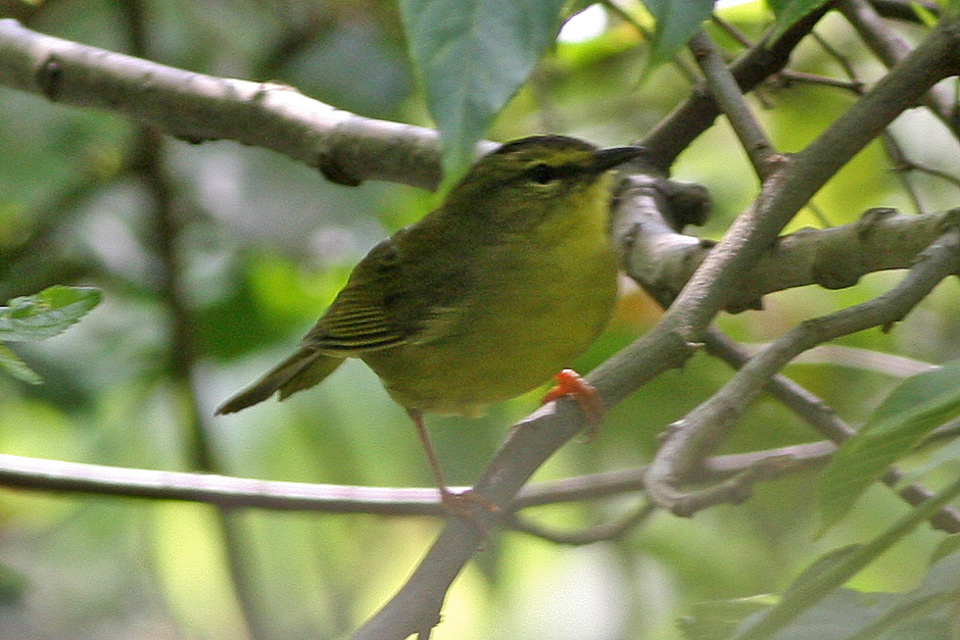

Conservation status
- Least Concern (IUCN 3.1)

- Least Concern (IUCN 3.1)

Scientific classification
- Kingdom: Animalia
- Phylum: Chordata
- Class: Aves
- Order: Passeriformes
- Family: Parulidae
- Genus: Myiothlypis
- Species: M. bivittata

Binomial name
- Myiothlypis bivittata (d'Orbigny & Lafresnaye, 1837)
- Distribution of M. bivittata

Synonyms
- See text

= Two-banded warbler =

Species of bird

The two-banded warbler (Myiothlypis bivittata) is a species of bird in the family Parulidae, the New World warblers. It is found in Argentina, Bolivia, Brazil, Guyana, Peru, and Venezuela.

== Taxonomy and systematics ==
The two-banded warbler was formally described in 1837 with the binomial Muscicapa bivittata. At some time in the nineteenth century it was reassigned to genus Basileuterus that had been erected in 1848. By 2007 taxonomic systems had begun to resurrect genus Myiothlypis, which had been erected in 1850, for the two-banded warbler and many other species.

The two-banded warbler's taxonomy remains unresolved. AviList, the Clements taxonomy, and the South American Classification Committee assign it these three subspecies:

- M. b. roraimae (Sharpe, 1885)
- M. b. bivittata (d'Orbigny & Lafresnaye)
- M. b. argentinae (Zimmer, JT, 1949)

However, in 2014 the IOC split the species into two, calling roraimae the "Roraiman warbler" and retaining the English name "two-banded warbler" for bivittata plus argentinae.BirdLife International's Handbook of the Birds of the World (HBW) did the same in 2016. They retain this treatment as of early 2026 and late 2025 respectively.

AviList states that "Taxon roraimae is retained within Myiothlypis bivittata. These taxa are highly divergent based on analysis of mitochondrial DNA and have very different songs but a split is deferred pending publication of current research." Clements recognizes these differences within the species, somewhat mirroring the IOC and HBW names by calling roraimae the "two-banded warbler (Roraiman)" and grouping bivittata plus argentinae as the "two-banded warbler (two-banded)".

This article follows the AviList/Clements/SACC three-subspecies model.

== Description ==
The two-banded warbler is 12.5 to 14 cm (4.9 to 5.5 in) long and weighs 11 to 17 g (0.39 to 0.60 oz). The sexes have the same plumage. Adults of the nominate subspecies M. b. bivittata have a black crown with olive tips on some feathers and an orange-rufous stripe in its middle. They have dusky lores, a yellow supercilium that becomes a crescent over the eye, and a buffy white to yellow crescent below the eye on an otherwise olive-green face. Their nape and upperparts are olive-green. Their throat and underparts are mostly yellow with a very pale olive wash on the sides of the breast and the flanks. Subspecies M. b. argentinae has a mostly yellow central crown stripe, more olive on the crown's feather tips, a wider supercilium, and slightly paler upperparts than the nominate. M. b. roraimae has no olive on the black crown feathers. Their supercilium becomes yellowish olive past the eye, their lores extend as a short dusky line through the eye, and their eye crescents are fainter than the nominate's. Their underparts are a darker olive on the sides of the breast and the flanks. Adults of all subspecies have a dark brown iris, a blackish brown maxilla, a brown mandible with a pinkish base, and yellowish brown to yellowish pink legs and feet.

== Distribution and habitat ==
The two-banded warbler has a disjunct distribution. The range of M. b. roraimae is very distant from the contiguous ranges of the other two subspecies and has gaps within it. That subspecies is found on the tepuis of southeastern Venezuela's Amazonas and Bolívar states, western Guyana, and extreme northern Brazil. There are also scattered records in Brazil south and east of its core range. The nominate subspecies is found on the eastern slope of the Andes from western Madre de Dios and eastern Cuzco departments of southeastern Peru southeast to Bolivia's western Santa Cruz Department. M. b. argentinae continues on the eastern Andean slope from Santa Cruz south to northern Argentina's Jujuy and Salta provinces.

The two-banded warbler's subspecies M. b. roraimae inhabits the interior and edges of humid primary and secondary forest. In Venezuela it ranges in elevation between 800 and 1,800 m (2,600 and 5,900 ft) and in Brazil between 700 and 1,800 m (2,300 and 5,900 ft). The other two subspecies inhabit a wider variety of dry, humid, and wet forest. They favor areas with a dense understory, and in Peru at least is often associated with thickets of bamboo. In Peru it ranges in elevation between 750 and 1,500 m (2,500 and 4,900 ft) and in Bolivia between 300 and 2,200 m (1,000 and 7,200 ft).

== Behavior ==
=== Movement ===
The two-banded warbler is a sedentary year-round resident.

=== Feeding ===
The two-banded warbler's diet has not been studied but is believed to be mostly or entirely invertebrates. Pairs and family groups usually forage in the forest understory between about 2 and 10 m (7 and 33 ft) above the ground but will go all the way to the canopy. The species mostly gleans its prey from vegetation and branches. It only infrequently joins mixed-species feeding flocks.

=== Breeding ===
The only information on the breeding biology of the two-banded warbler's subspecies M. b. roraimae is that its season appears to include February and March. The other two subspecies breed between September and December. They make a covered nest with a side entrance from plant fibers; it is placed on the ground. The clutch appears to average three eggs; they are pinkish white with maroon or grayish markings. The incubation period is about 15 days and fledging occurs about 11 days after hatch. Both parents provision nestlings.

=== Vocalization ===
The song of two-banded warbler's subspecies M. b. roraimae is a series of "bouncy tic notes rappidly accelerating and ending in smooth rising buzz, tis, tis-tis-tic'tic 'tic't't't'z'zzzzzzzZZZZE". It also sings "a more choppy, stuttering tis, tis tis my wish-wish-to gp'wee'wee!, accelerating and rising somewhat". In Peru the nominate subspecies sing "a deep, rich, accelerating warble, often in antiphonal duet, with some variation: churt-churt-churt-SEE-djidjidjidjew answered by ti-tio-ti-chip-djerditew". There its call is "a deep, rich djurt, often in rapid stuttering chatter". Further south M. b. argentinae sings "a fast, seemingly endless chee chee choo choo chiddle chiddle chum chum tiddle chee chee choo choo chew chiddle chup chup tiddle...".

== Status ==
The IUCN follows HBW taxonomy and so has separately assessed the "Roraiman" (roraimae) and "two-banded" sensu stricto (bivittata + argentinae) warblers. Both are of Least Concern. Neither population's size is known and both are believed to be decreasing. No immediate threats to either have been identified. The species is considered "locally fairly common to common, even abundant" overall and fairly common in Peru.
