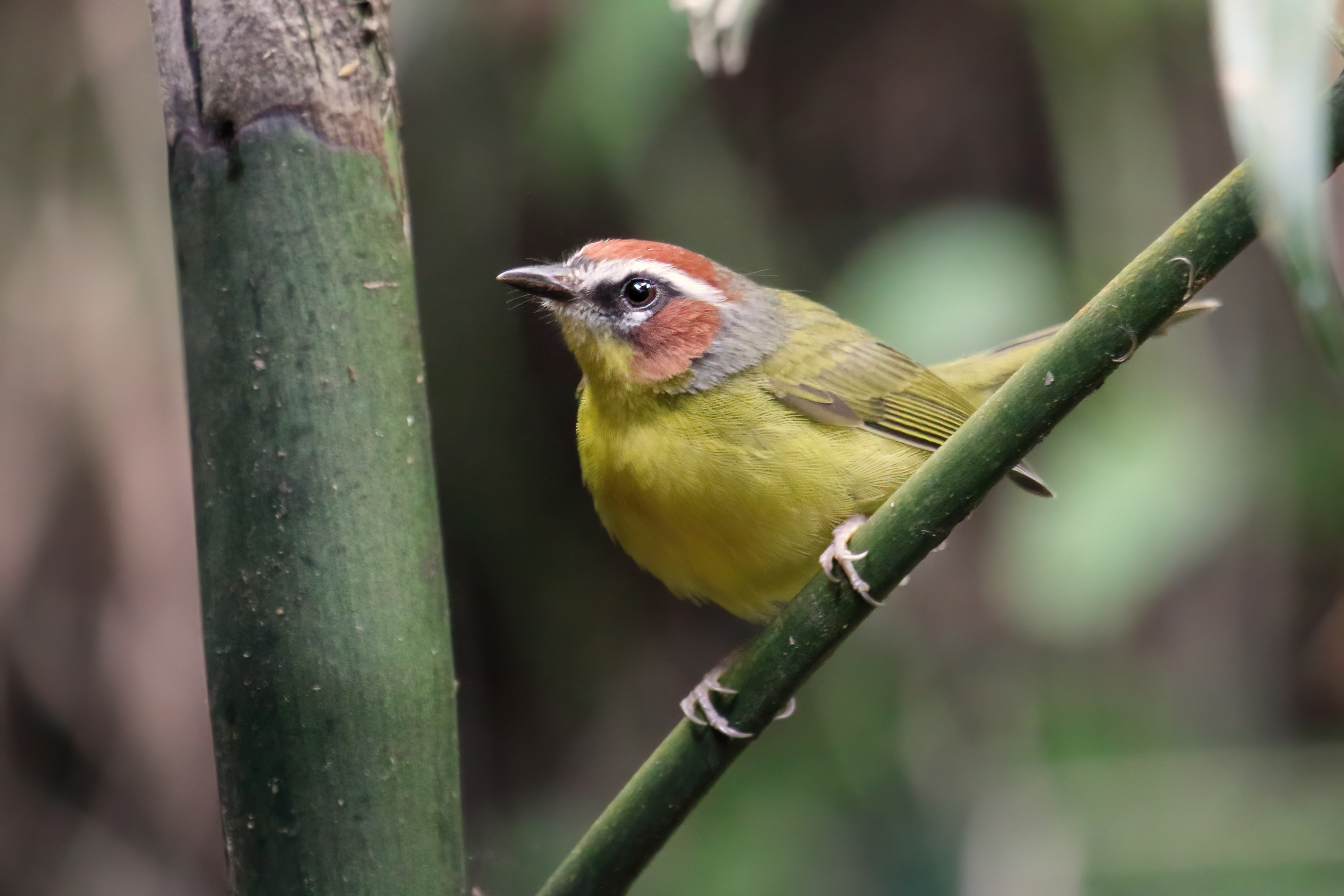

Scientific classification
- Kingdom: Animalia
- Phylum: Chordata
- Class: Aves
- Order: Passeriformes
- Family: Parulidae
- Genus: Basileuterus
- Species: B. delattrii

Binomial name
- Basileuterus delattrii Bonaparte, 1854
- See the Distribution section for comments

= Chestnut-capped warbler =

Species of bird

The chestnut-capped warbler (Basileuterus delattrii) is a species of bird in the family Parulidae, the New World warblers. It is found from Guatemala to Colombia and Venezuela.

== Taxonomy and systematics ==
The chestnut-capped warbler has a complicated taxonomic history. It was formally described in 1854 with its current binomial Basileuterus delattrii. By the end of the twentieth century its three subspecies had been lumped with the five subspecies of the rufous-capped warbler (B. rufifrons). One of the three and some of the five had earlier been treated as full species.

The further taxonomy of the chestnut-capped warbler remains unsettled. In 2021 the American Ornithological Society, the IOC, and the Clements taxonomy again split the three subspecies as the chestnut-capped warbler. They retained the other five subspecies as the rufous-capped warbler. The South American Classification Committee implemented the split in March 2025 and AviList included it in its 2025 inaugural version. However, as of late 2025 BirdLife International's Handbook of the Birds of the World (HBW) did not recognize the split and retained all eight subspecies in the rufous-capped warbler.

All of the systems except HBW recognize these three subspecies of the chestnut-capped warbler:

- B. d. delattrii Bonaparte, 1854
- B. d. mesochrysus Sclater, PL, 1860
- B. d. actuosus Wetmore, 1957

== Description ==
The chestnut-capped warbler is about 13 cm (5.1 in) long and weighs 7 to 16 g (0.25 to 0.56 oz). The sexes have the same plumage. Adults of the nominate subspecies B. d. delattrii have a chestnut crown and ear coverts with a long white supercilium between them, black lores, and a white spot under the eye. Their nape is olive-gray and their upperparts olive. Their wings and tail are dusky gray with olive edges on the feathers. Their chin is white and their underparts mostly golden yellow with an olive-buff wash on their flanks, vent, and undertail coverts. Subspecies B. d. mesochrysus has a paler crown than the nominate, a small white spot below the lores, and a grayish neck and upper mantle. B. d. actuosus is similar to mesochrysus but has darker upperparts and duller underparts. All subspecies have a dark iris, a blackish bill, and pinkish legs and feet.

== Distribution and habitat ==
The chestnut-capped warbler has a disjunct distribution that the map does not fully show. The nominate subspecies is found from southern Guatemala south through El Salvador, most of Honduras, and western Nicaragua into western Costa Rica as far as Cartago and central San José provinces. Past a gap, subspecies B. d. mesochrysus is found from southern San José and central Puntarenas provinces in southern Costa Rica to Panamá Province in central Panama. It also is found separately in the Serranía del Perijá on the Venezuela/Colombia border and in Colombia from the Caribbean south along the Central Andes to Huila Department. B. d. actuosus is found only on Coiba Island off the Pacific coast of western Panama.

The chestnut-capped warbler inhabits dry to moist deciduous woodlands, young secondary forest, the edges of denser forest, and shade coffee plantations. In elevation it ranges between 450 and 2,150 m (1,500 and 7,100 ft) in Guatemala, Honduras, and El Salvador, from sea level to 2,000 m (6,600 ft) in northern Costa Rica, and between 600 and 1,600 m (2,000 and 5,200 ft) in southern Costa Rica. In Venezuela it is found at about 1,000 m (3,300 ft) and in Colombia from sea level to 2,200 m (7,200 ft).

== Behavior ==
=== Movement ===
The chestnut-capped warbler is a sedentary year-round resident.

=== Feeding ===
The chestnut-capped warbler feeds primarily on insects and other invertebrates but includes small numbers of berries in its diet. It is a deliberate forager, taking most food by gleaning from vegetation in the habitat's lower to mid-level..

=== Breeding ===
Almost nothing is known about the chestnut-capped warbler's breeding biology except from a study in Costa Rica. The study spanned from mid-May to early July over three years and included observations at 11 nests. Nests were a domed cup with a side entrance; most were made from grasses and dead leaves though two were made primarily from twigs. All but one were on a slope and all were hidden beneath a shrub, below rocks, or under leaf litter. Females did most of the nest building with small contributions by males. The six observed clutches were of three or four eggs that were pinkish white with brown speckles. Females alone incubated, for 13 to 14 days. Both parents provisioned nestlings and removed fecal sacs. The nestling period before fledging could not be determined.

=== Vocalization ===
The chestnut-capped warbler's song is a "fast, dry series of jumbled notes on various pitches and often running into a trill; rather variable, usually starts with chirping notes and ends with accented whistle". Its call is "an emphatic, metallic plik or chink, also often extended into a chatter when bird agitated".

== Status ==
The IUCN follows HBW taxonomy and so has not separately assessed the rufous-capped (sensu stricto) and chestnut-capped warblers. The chestnut-capped warbler is considered common in Guatemala, Honduras, El Salvador, Costa Rica, and Colombia. In Venezuela it is known only from a few specimens. "This species' preference for scrubby habitats and second growth means that habitat loss is not a serious problem."
