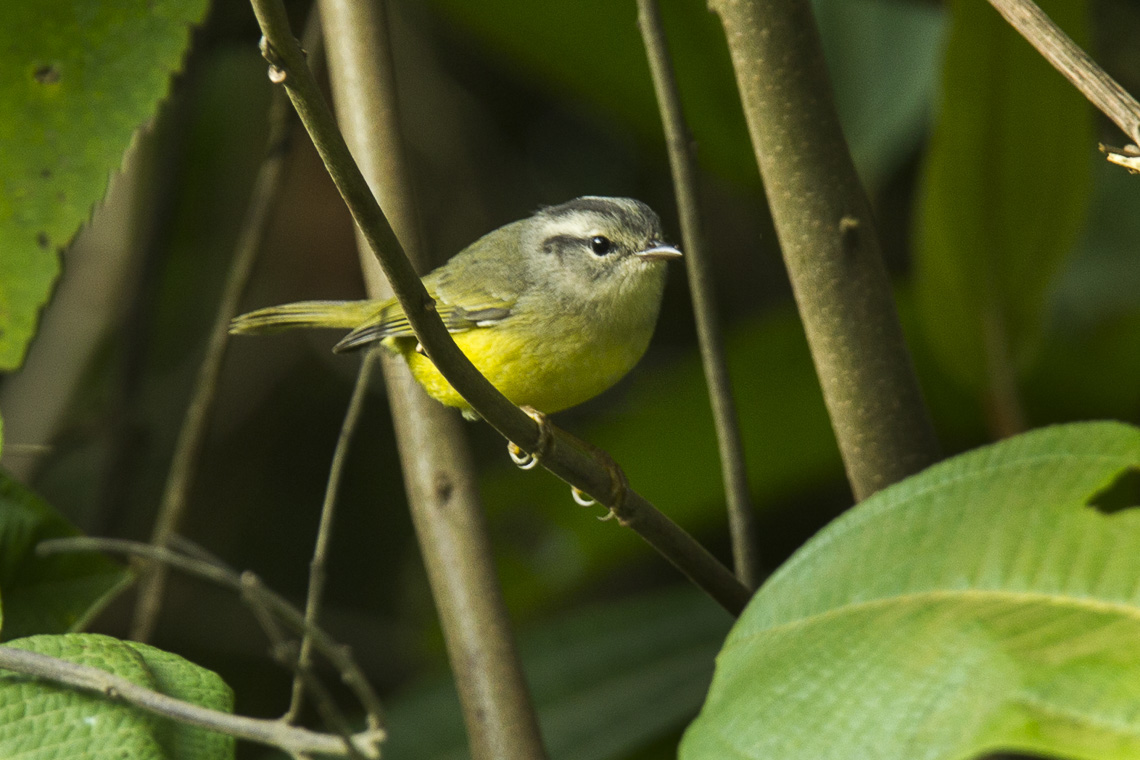

Conservation status
- Least Concern (IUCN 3.1)

Scientific classification
- Kingdom: Animalia
- Phylum: Chordata
- Class: Aves
- Order: Passeriformes
- Family: Parulidae
- Genus: Basileuterus
- Species: B. trifasciatus

Binomial name
- Basileuterus trifasciatus Taczanowski, 1880

= Three-banded warbler =

Species of bird

The three-banded warbler (Basileuterus trifasciatus) is a species of bird in the family Parulidae, the New World warblers. It is found in Ecuador and Peru.

== Taxonomy and systematics ==
The three-banded warbler was formally described in 1880 with its current binomial Basileuterus trifasciatus. Some authors have treated it as a subspecies of the golden-crowned warbler (M. culicivorus).

The three-banded warbler has two subspecies, the nominate B. t. trifasciatus (Taczanowski, 1880) and B. t. nitidior (Chapman, 1924).

== Description ==
The three-banded warbler is 12.5 cm (4.9 in) long and weighs 8.5 to 11 g (0.30 to 0.39 oz). The sexes have the same plumage. Adults of the nominate subspecies have a pale gray crown stripe with black borders, grayish white lores and supercilium, a thin black stripe through the eye, and medium gray ear coverts with a blackish rear edge. Their nape and upper mantle are medium gray, their back and wings olive-gray, and their rump and tail olive. Their throat is white that becomes yellow on the rest of the underparts; the throat and upper breast are smudged with gray. Subspecies B. t. nitidior has a yellow wash on the gray crown stripe and more olive (less gray) upperparts than the nominate. Both subspecies have a dark iris, a blackish horn maxilla, a paler horn mandible, and dusky pinkish legs and feet.

== Distribution and habitat ==
The three-banded warbler has a disjunct distribution; there is a small gap between the subspecies that the map does not show. Subspecies B. t. nitidior is the more northerly of the two. It is found on the western Andean slope in southwestern Ecuador's El Oro and Loja provinces and far northwestern Peru's adjoining Tumbes and northwestern Piura departments. The nominate is found on the western slope of the Andes from eastern Piura Department south to northern La Libertad Department. The species primarily inhabits the interior and edges of submontane and montane rainforest. It also occurs along watercourses in dryer forest and in mature secondary forest with dense understory. In elevation it ranges mostly between 800 and 2,400 m (2,600 and 7,900 ft) in Ecuador and between 650 and 3,000 m (2,100 and 9,800 ft) in Peru.

== Behavior ==
=== Movement ===
The three-banded warbler is a sedentary year-round resident.

=== Feeding ===
The three-banded warbler's diet has not been studied though it is believed to feed primarily or solely on invertebrates. It forages by gleaning from vegetation, mostly in the forest understory. Individuals, pairs, and family groups sometimes join mixed-species feeding flocks.

=== Breeding ===
The three-banded warbler breeds between January and April. Its nest is a domed cup with a side entrance. It is constructed on the ground from twigs, leaves, grass, and rootlets and lined with softer plant matter. The clutch is two eggs. The incubation period and time to fledging are not known. Both parents provision nestlings.

=== Vocalization ===
The three-banded warbler's song is "a warbling and pulsating trill, rising slightly in pitch" and its call "a sharp tsit, repeated regularly".

== Status ==
The IUCN has assessed the three-banded warbler as being of Least Concern. It has a restricted range; its population size is not known and is believed to be decreasing. No immediate threats have been identified. It is considered "uncommon to locally fairly common" in Ecuador and fairly common in Peru.
