= Tacarcuna warbler =

Conservation status
- Least Concern (IUCN 3.1)

Scientific classification
- Kingdom: Animalia
- Phylum: Chordata
- Class: Aves
- Order: Passeriformes
- Family: Parulidae
- Genus: Basileuterus
- Species: B. tacarcunae

Binomial name
- Basileuterus tacarcunae Chapman, 1924

Species of bird

The Tacarcuna warbler (Basileuterus tacarcunae) is a species of bird in the family Parulidae, the New World warblers. It is found in Colombia and Panama.

== Taxonomy and systematics ==
The Tacarcuna warbler was formally described in 1924 with its current binomial Basileuterus tacarcunae. For much of the twentieth century it was treated as a subspecies of the three-striped warbler (M. tristriatus). It and other subspecies were recognized as full species based on studies published in 2012 and 2014. But as of July 2026 the South American Classification Committee had not implemented the split.

The Tacarcuna warbler is monotypic.

== Description ==
The Tacarcuna warbler is about 13 cm (5.1 in) long. The sexes have the same plumage. Adults have an orange crown stripe, a long and thin black stripe below it, and a long pale olive supercilium. Their lores and ear coverts are olive and they have a pale buffy white arc under the eye. Their ear coverts have pale yellow bottom and rear edges. Their upperparts, wings, and tail are warm olive-brown. Their throat is yellowish that becomes mostly pale olive-buff on the breast and a yellower olive-buff on the belly. The sides of their breast and their flanks have an olive-gray wash. They have a dark brown iris, a fuscous bill with a dull brownish white base to the mandible, and brown legs and feet.

== Distribution and habitat ==
The Tacarcuna warbler has a highly disjunct distribution. It is found on its namesake Cerro Tacarcuna in Panama's Darién Province, other individual mountains in Panamá Province and Guna Yala (San Blas Province), and in the extreme northwestern part of Colombia's Chocó Department. It inhabits primary and mature secondary montane evergreen forest in the upper tropical and subtropical zones. Sources differ on its elevational range. One says it is "poorly described, but known from [about] 850 to 1,200 m (2,800 to 3,900 ft). Another states it is 800 to 2,500 m (2,600 to 8,200 ft).

== Behavior ==
=== Movement ===
The Tacarcuna warbler is a year-round resident.

=== Feeding ===
The Tacarcuna warbler's diet and feeding behavior have not been studied but are believed to be similar to those of its former "parent", the three-striped warbler, which see here.

=== Breeding ===
Nothing is known about the Tacarcuna warbler's breeding biology, but it is believed to be similar to that the three-striped warbler, which see here.

=== Vocalization ===
As of July 2026 xeno-canto had a single recording of a Tacarcuna song and none of its calls. The Cornell Lab's Macaulay Library had four others of song. The song is described as not well known, "a mixture of agitated trills, twitters, warbles and buzzy notes". Its calls include a "sharp tchp, repeated regularly, and often extended into staccato chatter when agitated, and [a] husky, high-pitched che-weep".

== Status ==
The IUCN has assessed the Tacarcuna warbler as being of Least Concern. It has a restricted range; its population size is not known and is believed to be stable. No immediate threats have been identified. It is found in Darién National Park.
