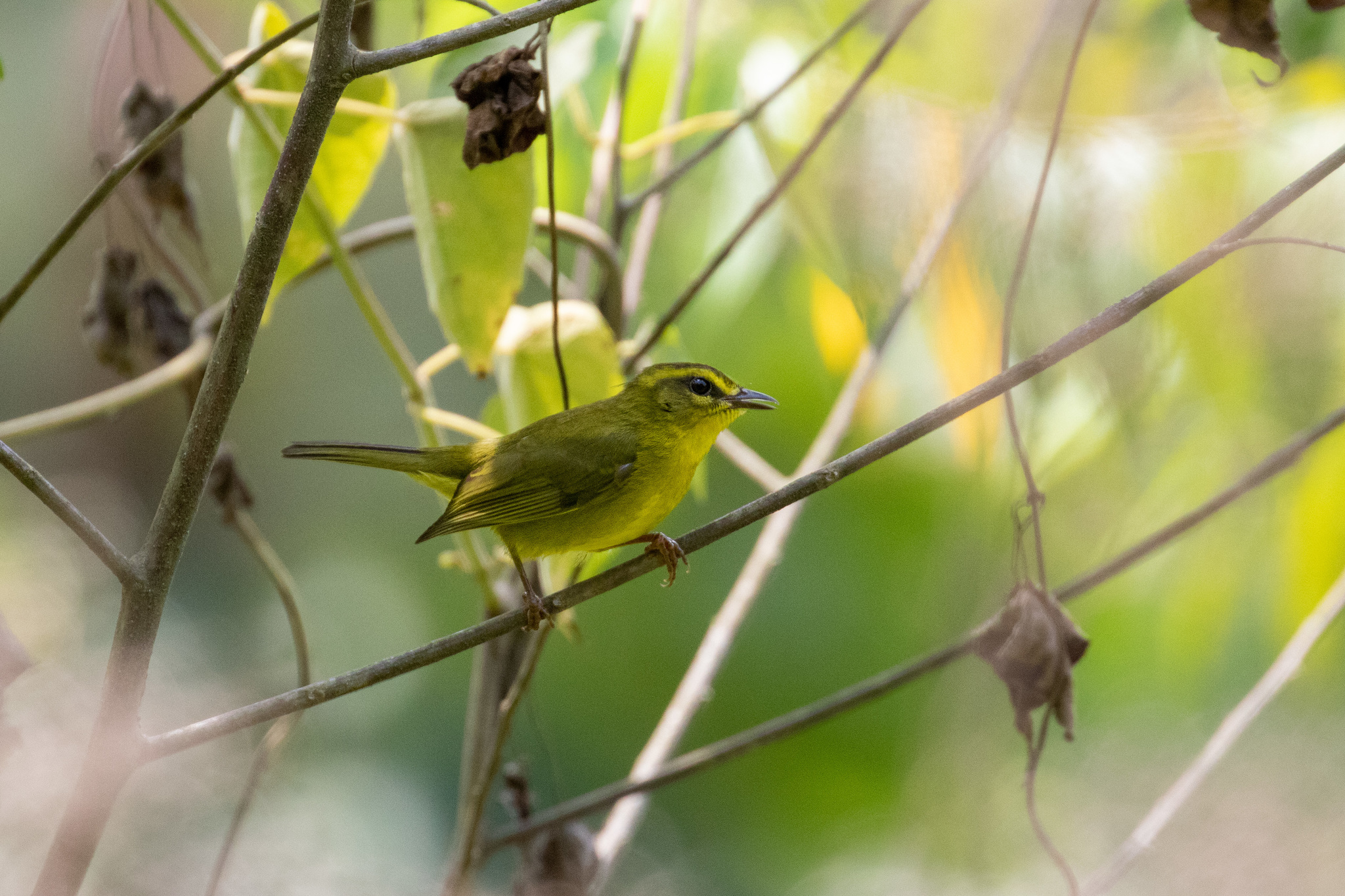
- B. c. chrysogaster in Peru

Conservation status
- Least Concern (IUCN 3.1)

Scientific classification
- Kingdom: Animalia
- Phylum: Chordata
- Class: Aves
- Order: Passeriformes
- Family: Parulidae
- Genus: Myiothlypis
- Species: M. chrysogaster

Binomial name
- Myiothlypis chrysogaster (Tschudi, 1844)

Synonyms
- See text

= Cuzco warbler =

Golden-bellied warbler

Species of bird

The Cuzco warbler (Myiothlypis chrysogaster) is a species of bird in the family Parulidae, the New World warblers. It is found in Bolivia and Peru.

== Taxonomy and systematics ==
The Cuzco warbler was formally described in 1844 with the binomial Setophaga chrysogaster. At some time in the nineteenth century it was reassigned to genus Basileuterus that had been erected in 1848. By 2007 taxonomic systems had begun to resurrect genus Myiothlypis, which had been erected in 1850, for chrysogaster and many other species.

Into the twentieth century what are now the Cuzco warbler and the Choco warbler (M. chlorophrys) were treated as a single species, the golden-bellied warbler. By 2012 the IOC had split the two. BirdLife International's Handbook of the Birds of the World (HBW) did the same in 2016, though it kept the name "golden-bellied" warbler for chrysogaster until 2024. The Clements taxonomy adopted the split in 2022. However, as of February 2026 the South American Classification Committee retained the two-subspecies golden-bellied warbler.

This article follows the majority one-subspecies model.

== Description ==
The Cuzco warbler is 11.5 to 13 cm (4.5 to 5.1 in) long and weighs 9.2 to 13 g (0.32 to 0.46 oz). The sexes have the same plumage. Adults have a black crown with an orange-yellow stripe in its middle; both sets of feathers have olive tips. They have a long yellow supercilium and yellow crescents above and below the eye on an otherwise olive-green face. Their nape and upperparts are olive-green. Their throat and underparts are mostly yellow with a heavy olive wash on the sides of the breast and the flanks. They have a dark iris, a blackish bill, and yellowish straw legs and feet.

== Distribution and habitat ==
The Cuzco warbler has a disjunct distribution on outlying ridges on the east side of the Andes. It is found along the southern border of Loreto and San Martín departments in northern Peru; at the triple point of Huánuco, Ucayali, and Pasco departments in central Peru, and from south-central Pasco southeast into Bolivia's La Paz Department. It primarily inhabits the interior and edges of humid primary and secondary lowland and submontane forest. In Peru it overall ranges in elevation between 300 and 2,000 m (1,000 and 6,600 ft) but only as high as 1,250 m (4,100 ft) in the south. In Bolivia it ranges between 500 and 1,200 m (1,600 and 3,900 ft).

== Behavior ==
=== Movement ===
The Cuzco warbler is a sedentary year-round resident.

=== Feeding ===
The Cuzco warbler's diet has not been studied but is believed to be mostly or entirely invertebrates. Pairs and family groups usually forage from the forest's mid-level to its subcanopy. The species mostly gleans its prey from vegetation and branches. It often joins mixed-species feeding flocks.

=== Breeding ===
Almost nothing is known about the Cuzco warbler's breeding biology. One nest has been photographed; it was a covered cup made from plant fibers and on the ground. It contained three eggs that were white with darker markings.

=== Vocalization ===
The Cuzco warbler's song is "a series of loud, ringing, descending notes: tee tee chew chew CHEW CHEW CHEW" and its call "a low, chattering schep, usually in rapid stuttered series".

== Status ==
The IUCN has assessed the Cuzco warbler as being of Least Concern. Its population size is not known and is believed to be decreasing. No immediate threats have been identified. It is considered uncommon in Peru and fairly common in its small Bolivian range.
