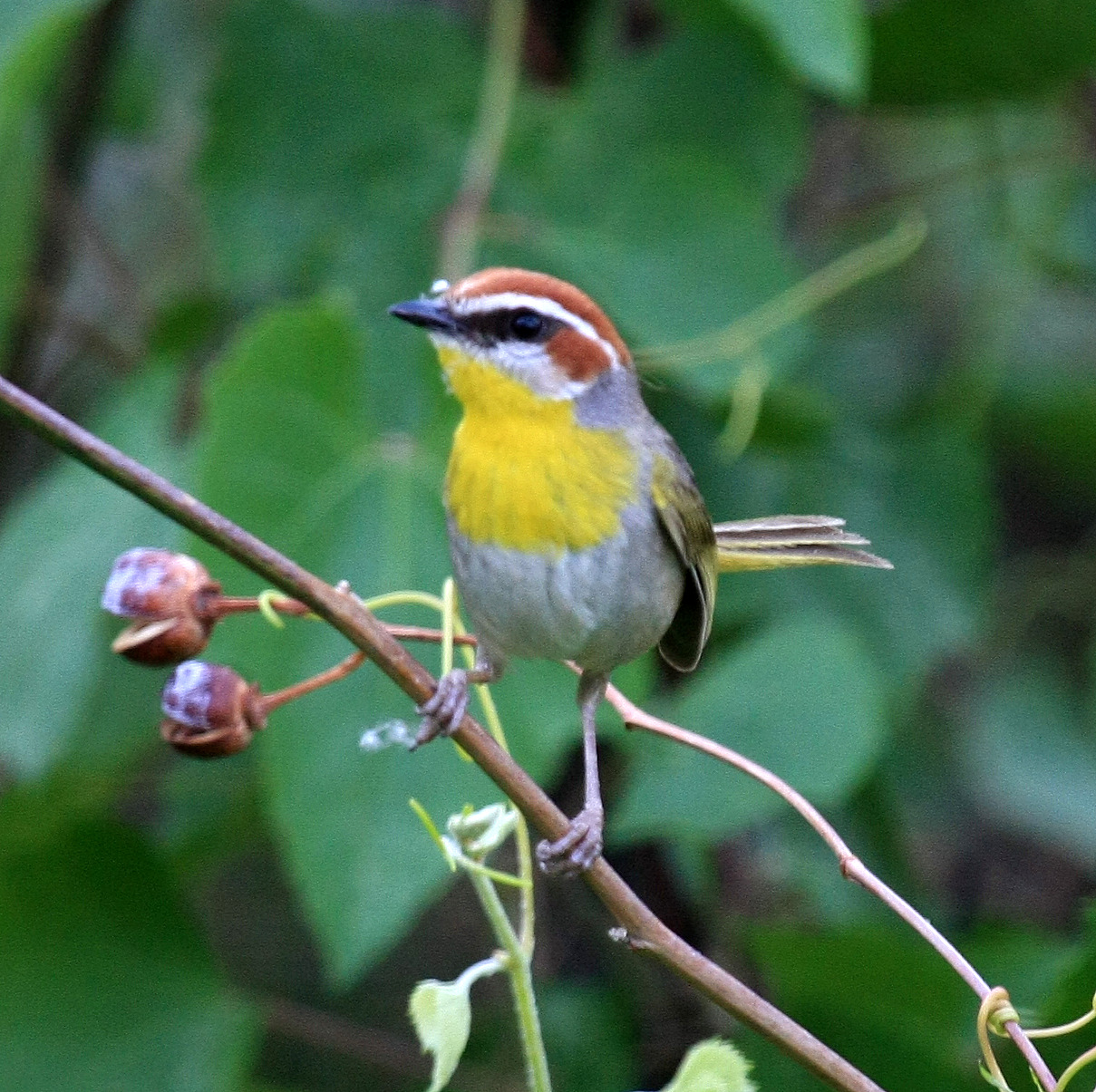

Scientific classification
- Kingdom: Animalia
- Phylum: Chordata
- Class: Aves
- Order: Passeriformes
- Family: Parulidae
- Genus: Basileuterus
- Species: B. rufifrons

Binomial name
- Basileuterus rufifrons (Swainson, 1838)
- Range of B. rufifrons Year-round range

= Rufous-capped warbler =

Species of bird

The rufous-capped warbler (Basileuterus rufifrons) is a species of bird in the family Parulidae, the New World warblers. It is found in Belize, Guatemala, and Mexico. It also occurs as a casual visitor to the U. S. states of Arizona and Texas.

== Taxonomy and systematics ==
The rufous-capped warbler has a complicated taxonomic history. It was formally described in 1838 with the binomial Setophaga rufifrons. For a time in the nineteenth century it was placed in a new genus Idiotes. In 1902 Robert Ridgway assigned it to its present genus Basileuterus. By the end of the twentieth century it had been assigned eight subspecies, several of which had been treated by various authors as full species.

The further taxonomy of the rufous-capped warbler remains unsettled. In 2021 the American Ornithological Society, the IOC, and the Clements taxonomy split three of the subspecies as the chestnut-capped warbler (M. delatrii). They retained these five subspecies as the rufous-capped warbler:

- B. r. caudatus Nelson, 1899
- B. r. dugesi Ridgway, 1892
- B. r. jouyi Ridgway, 1892
- B. r. rufifrons (Swainson, 1838)
- B. r. salvini Cherrie, 1891

The South American Classification Committee implemented the split in March 2025 and AviList included it in its 2025 inaugural version.

However, as of late 2025 BirdLife International's Handbook of the Birds of the World (HBW) did not recognize the split and retained all eight subspecies in the rufous-capped warbler.

== Description ==
The rufous-capped warbler is about 13 cm (5.1 in) long and weighs 7 to 16 g (0.25 to 0.56 oz). The sexes have the same plumage. Adults of the nominate subspecies B. r. rufifrons have a rufous crown and ear coverts with a long white supercilium between them, black lores, and a wide white streak from the lores under the eye and ear coverts. Their nape is grayish and their upperparts olive gray. Their wings and tail are dusky gray with yellow-green edges on the feathers. Their chin is white, their throat and upper breast are lemon yellow, their lower breast and belly are brownish white, and their flanks, vent, and undertail coverts have an olive-buff wash. Juveniles have an olive-brown head with a warmer brown crown. Their upperparts are olive-brown. Their greater and median upperwing coverts have buff tips that show as two wing bars. Their breast is pale olive-buff that becomes yellowish white on the belly and undertail coverts.

The other subspecies of the rufous-capped warbler differ from the nominate and each other thus:

- B. r. caudatus: second-longest tail; paler rufous on head and duller grayer upperparts than nominate
- B. r. dugesi: longest tail; like caudatus with slightly more olive upperparts
- B. r. jouyi: grayer upperparts than nominate
- B. r. salvini: yellow breast that becomes yellowish white lower down

All subspecies have a dark iris, a blackish bill, and pinkish legs and feet.

== Distribution and habitat ==
The subspecies of the rufous-capped warbler are found thus:

- B. r. caudatus: northwestern Mexico from Sonora and western Chihuahua south to northern Durango (and see below)
- B. r. dugesi: central Mexico from southern Sinaloa and western Durango south to southern Puebla and western Oaxaca
- B. r. jouyi: northeastern Mexico from Coahuila, Nuevo León, and western Tamaulipas south to eastern Hidalgo and central Veracruz
- B. r. rufifrons: southern Mexico and into Guatemala to the Motagua River valley
- B. r. salvini: Gulf/Caribbean slope from southern Veracruz and northern Oaxaca south to Guatemala and Belize, where it is spottily found

Subspecies B. r. caudatus is a regular visitor to southeastern Arizona and to Texas in the Big Bend area, lower Rio Grande Valley, and the Edwards Plateau, and it occasionally has bred in the U. S.

The rufous-capped warbler inhabits a variety of somewhat dry and open landscapes including scrublands, open woodlands, hedgerows, young secondary forest, shade coffee plantations, and the edges of mature forest. It shuns the interior of forest. Overall it ranges from sea level to 3,000 m (9,800 ft) but is found between 450 and 2,150 m (1,500 and 7,100 ft) south of Mexico.

== Behavior ==
=== Movement ===
The rufous-capped warbler is overall a sedentary year-round resident but for individual vagrants that reach the southwestern U. S.

=== Feeding ===
The rufous-capped warbler feeds primarily on insects and other invertebrates but includes small numbers of berries in its diet. It is a deliberate forager, taking most food by gleaning from vegetation in the habitat's lower to mid-level. It sometimes joins mixed-species feeding flocks.

=== Breeding ===
The rufous-capped warbler's breeding season has not been defined but is known to span at least April to July. Its nest is a domed cup with a side entrance placed on the ground and usually hidden under rocks, a log, or vegetation. It is constructed from a variety of plant fibers with a lining of softer fibers. The clutch is two to four eggs that are white and heavily marked with reddish spots and streaks. The incubation period, time to fledging, and details of parental care are not known.

=== Vocalization ===
Both male and female rufous-capped warblers sing, a fast-paced trill with sections each of which is several repeats of a syllable. One rendering is "tsip-tsip-tsip-three'three'three'sea'sea'tawhee!". Its call is "a hard tcheck, usually extended into harsh chatter in agitation".

== Status ==
The IUCN follows HBW taxonomy and so has not separately assessed the rufous-capped (sensu stricto) and chestnut-capped warblers. The rufous-capped warbler is considered common in Mexico and fairly common in Belize and Guatemala. "This species' preference for scrubby habitats and second growth means that habitat loss is not a serious problem."
