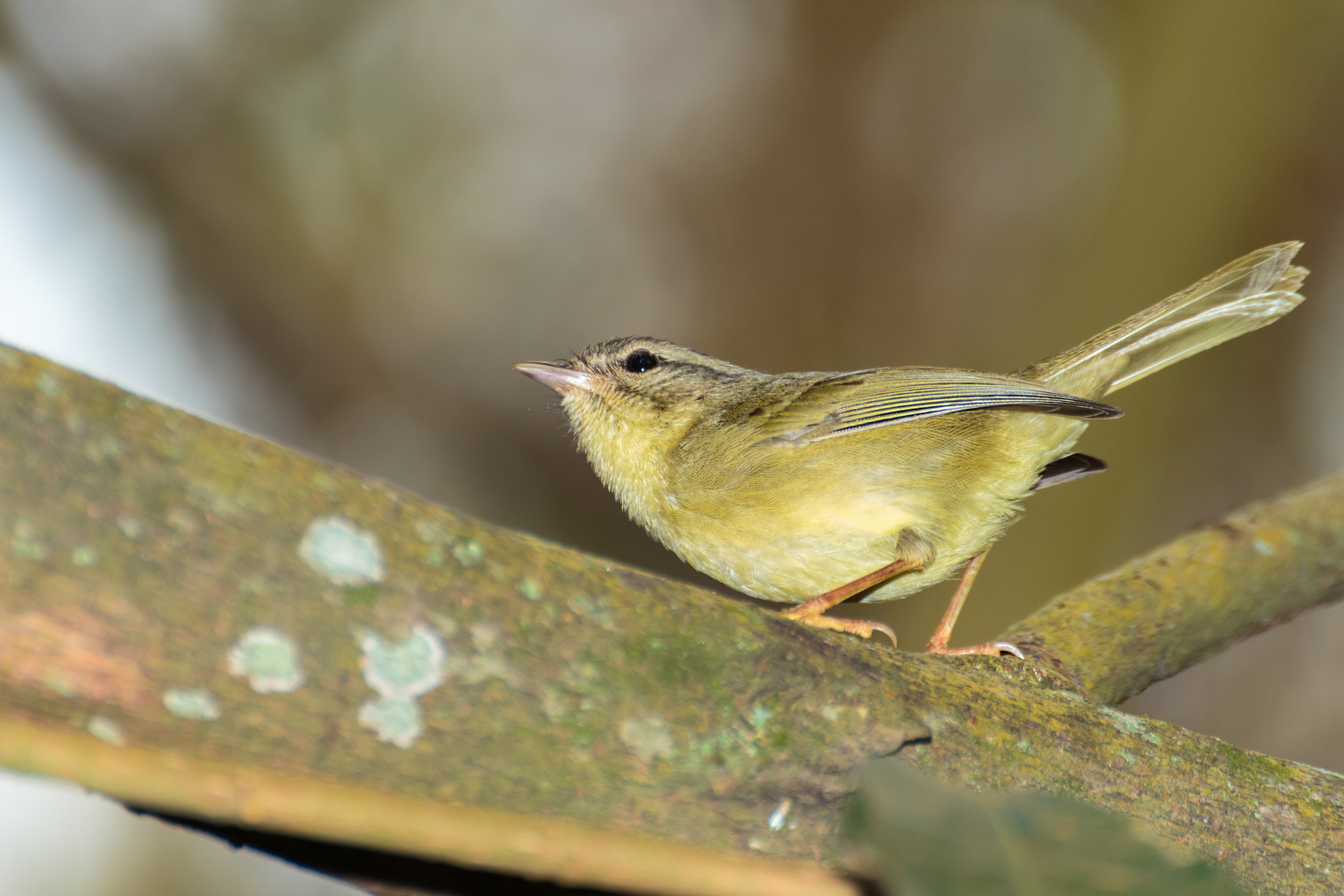

Conservation status
- Least Concern (IUCN 3.1)

Scientific classification
- Kingdom: Animalia
- Phylum: Chordata
- Class: Aves
- Order: Passeriformes
- Family: Parulidae
- Genus: Basileuterus
- Species: B. tristriatus

Binomial name
- Basileuterus tristriatus (Tschudi, 1844)

= Three-striped warbler =

Species of bird

The three-striped warbler (Basileuterus tristriatus) is a species of bird in the family Parulidae, the New World warblers. It is found in the Andes from Venezuela to Bolivia.

== Taxonomy and systematics ==
The three-striped warbler was formally described in 1844 by the Swiss naturalist Johann Jakob von Tschudi under the binomial Myiodioctes tristriatus. The specific epithet tristriatus is Modern Latin meaning "three-striped" or "three-streaked" from Latin tri- meaning "three-" and "striatus" meaning "striated". The type locality was corrected to Vitoc, Department of Junín, in central Peru by the Austrian ornithologist Carl Eduard Hellmayr in 1935. The three-striped warbler is now one of 12 species placed in the genus Basileuterus that was introduced in 1848 by the German ornithologist Jean Cabanis. The genus name is from Ancient Greek βασιλευτερος/basileuteros meaning "more kingly".

What are now the black-eared warbler (B. melanotis), the Tacarcuna warbler (B. tacarcunae), and the three subspecies of the Yungas warbler (B. punctipectus) were all previously treated as subspecies of the three-striped warbler. They were separated by most taxonomic systems based on studies published in 2012 and 2014. But as of early 2026 the South American Classification Committee had not implemented the split.

As of early 2026 most taxonomic systems recognize these eight subspecies of the three-striped warbler:

- B. t. daedalus Bangs, 1908
- B. t. sanlucasensis Salaman, 2015
- B. t. auricularis Sharpe, 1885
- B. t. meridanus Sharpe, 1885
- B. t. bessereri Hellmayr, 1922
- B. t. pariae Phelps, WH & Phelps, WH Jr, 1949
- B. t. baezae Chapman, 1924
- B. t. tristriatus (Tschudi, 1844)

However, as of late 2025 BirdLife International's Handbook of the Birds of the World did not recognize B. t. bessereri.

This article follows the majority eight-subspecies model.

== Description ==
The three-striped warbler is about 13 cm (5.1 in) long. The sexes have the same plumage. Adults of the nominate subspecies B. t. tristriatus have a buffy-yellow crown stripe, a long and wide black stripe below it, and a long pale grayish white supercilium with a buff tinge below that. Their lores, eye stripe, and ear coverts are blackish. They have a small pale buffy-white patch under the eye and a pale yellow edge behind and under the ear coverts. Their upperparts, wings, and tail are olive with a gray wash. Their throat is whitish and their underparts mostly pale yellow that is brightest on the belly. The sides of their breast and their flanks have an olive-gray wash. Juveniles have a dusky olive-brown head with a hint of the adult's pattern. Their upperparts are dusky olive-brown; their greater and median upperwing coverts have buffy tips that show as two faint wing bars. Their underparts are mostly dusky brown with a paler buffish brown belly.

The other subspecies of the three-striped warbler differ from the nominate and each other thus:

- B. t. daedalus: buffier central crown stripe and heavier grayish olive wash on breast and flanks than nominate
- B. t. sanlucasensis: much like the nominate
- B. t. auricularis: buffier central crown stripe, blacker ear coverts, and heavier grayish olive wash on breast and flanks than nominate
- B. t. meridanus: pale buffy olive crown stripe and supercilium, olive ear coverts, and dull brown upperparts
- B. t. bessereri: similar to meridanus with brighter olive upperparts and paler yellow underparts
- B. t. pariae: similar to meridanus but with darker and browner upperparts
- B. t. baezae: similar to nominate with paler yellow underparts and richer buffy-olive flanks

All subspecies have a dark iris, a horn-colored bill with a darker culmen, and pale pinkish gray legs and feet.

== Distribution and habitat ==
The three-striped warbler has a disjunct distribution; most subspecies' ranges are not contiguous. The subspecies are found thus:

- B. t. daedalus: western slope of Colombia's Central Andes; Colombia's Western Andes and south on the western Andean slope to Edcuador's Cañar Province
- B. t. sanlucasensis: Serranía de San Lucas in northern Colombia's Bolívar Department
- B. t. auricularis: Serranía del Perijá on the Venezuela-Colombia border; Andes from western Venezuela's southern Táchira south through Zulia and along Colombia's Eastern Andes and the eastern slope of the Central Andes
- B. t. meridanus: Venezuelan Andes from northern Táchira north to southern Lara
- B. t. bessereri: Venezuelan Coastal Ranges from northwestern Lara east to southern Sucre and northern Monagas
- B. t. pariae: northeastern Venezuela's Paria Peninsula
- B. t. baezae: eastern Andean slope of Ecuador south to eastern Chimborazo and western Morona-Santiago provinces
- B. t. tristriatus: eastern Andean slope from southern Ecuador's Loja and Zamora-Chinchipe provinces south through Peru and into Bolivia

The three-striped warbler inhabits the interior and edges of humid montane forest in the foothills and subtropical zones and also mature secondary forest. In elevation it ranges between 800 and 2,700 m (2,600 and 8,900 ft) in Venezuela though most records are below 2,300 m (7,500 ft). There is also one winter record there at only 30 m (100 ft). It is found between 500 and 2,600 m (1,600 and 8,500 ft) in Colombia, mostly between 1,000 and 2,000 m (3,300 and 6,600 ft) in Ecuador, and between 1,050 and 2,200 m (3,400 and 7,200 ft) in Peru.

== Behavior ==
=== Movement ===
Though the three-striped warbler is not a migrant, outside the breeding season it roams with mixed species feeding flocks.

=== Feeding ===
The three-striped warbler's diet has not been studied but is thought to be primarily invertebrates. Pairs or small family groups forage in the forest's understory, taking most food by gleaning from vegetation. It occasionally takes prey in mid-air with a short sally. It regularly joins mixed-species feeding flocks.

=== Breeding ===
The three-striped warbler's breeding season has not been defined. It is known to span at least March to June in Venezuela and from February to May in Ecuador. There is nesting evidence in Colombia between January and July and in September and October. The species' nest is a domed cup with a side entrance. It is made from leaves, sticks, and moss, and lined with tree fern fibers, and placed on the ground or sited just above it. The clutch is two eggs that are creamy pinkish white with brown speckles. In a study in Venezuela, only the female incubated, for about 16 days. Fledging occurred 10 to 11 days after hatch and both parents provisioned nestlings.

=== Vocalization ===
The three-striped warbler's song varies somewhat across its range. In Venezuela it is described as "an unmusical, agitated chipping, [middle] part descending, last part ascending, tsit tsit tsit ee-tse-te'ti'ti'ti'ti'ti'chi-chi-chi-e-e-ez-ez" and its call while foraging is "a high, reedy chee-wéep". In Ecuador the song is "a fast, jumbled series of high-pitched notes that gradually accelerate into a crescendo and rise in pitch". It is similarly described in Peru as a "loud, high, ringing, rising crescendo of chipping notes, usually with weaker terminal notes". There its call is "a high series of ti notes, often in an accelerated series when excited".

== Status ==
The IUCN has assessed the three-striped warbler as being of Least Concern. It has a very large range; its population size is not known and is believed to be decreasing. "The only known threat to the species is ongoing habitat destruction for the expansion of agriculture and logging." It is considered common in Venezuela and Colombia, "often common" in Ecuador, and "common and widespread" in Peru.
