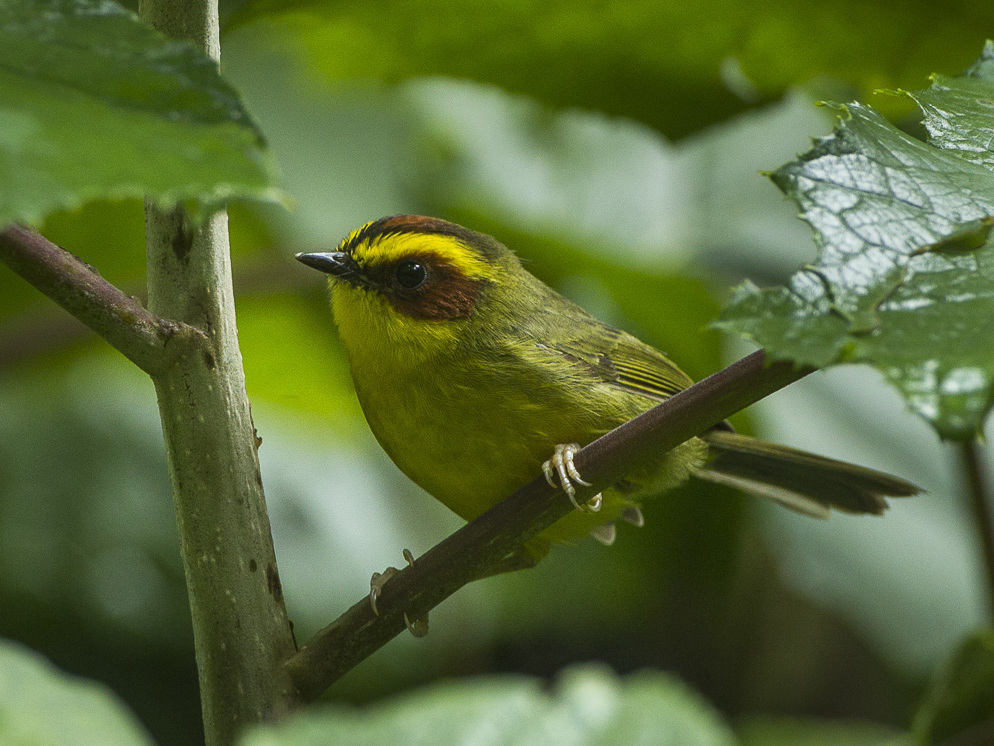

Conservation status
- Least Concern (IUCN 3.1)

Scientific classification
- Kingdom: Animalia
- Phylum: Chordata
- Class: Aves
- Order: Passeriformes
- Family: Parulidae
- Genus: Basileuterus
- Species: B. belli

Binomial name
- Basileuterus belli (Giraud Jr, 1841)

= Golden-browed warbler =

Species of bird

The golden-browed warbler (Basileuterus belli) is a species of bird in the family Parulidae, the New World warblers. It is found in El Salvador, Guatemala, Honduras, and Mexico.

== Taxonomy and systematics ==
The golden-browed warbler was formally described in 1841 with the binomial Muscicapa belli and the English name "Bell's Fly Catcher". It has these five subspecies:

- B. b. bateli Moore, RT, 1946
- B. b. belli (Giraud Jr, 1841)
- B. b. clarus Ridgway, 1902
- B. b. scitulus Nelson, 1900
- B. b. subobscurus Wetmore, 1940

== Description ==
The golden-browed warbler is 13 cm (5.1 in) long and weighs 7 to 13 g (0.25 to 0.46 oz). The sexes have the same plumage. Adults of the nominate subspecies B. b. belli have blackish lores and a rufous crown and ear coverts with a thin black line below the crown and a long bright yellow supercilium between the black line and the ear coverts. Their nape, upperparts, wings, and tail are bright olive-green. Their throat and underparts are mostly bright yellow with an olive wash on the sides of the breast and their flanks. Juveniles have an olive-brown head and upperparts. Their greater and median upperwing coverts have cinnamon-buff tips that show as two wing bars. Their throat and breast are a paler olive-brown that becomes pale yellowish on the belly and undertail coverts. Their flanks have a tawny-olive wash.

The other subspecies of the golden-browed warbler differ from the nominate and each other thus:

- B. b. bateli: rufous lores; paler and yellower upperparts and paler underparts than nominate
- B. b. clarus: dark chestnut lores; paler rufous crown and ear coverts, paler more yellowish olive upperparts, and brighter underparts than nominate
- B. b. scitulus: similar to clarus but with darker and duller olive upperparts
- B. b. subobscurus: darker and grayer than scitulus

All subspecies have a dark iris, a blackish bill, and dusky pinkish legs and feet.

== Distribution and habitat ==
The golden-browed warbler has a highly disjunct distribution. The subspecies are found thus:

- B. b. bateli: western Mexico from southeastern Sinaloa and western Durango south to Michoacán and México
- B. b. belli: eastern Mexico from southwestern Tamaulipas and eastern San Luis Potosí south to northern Oaxaca and central Veracruz
- B. b. clarus: southern Mexico in southern Morelos, southern Michoacán, Guerrero, and far western Oaxaca
- B. b. scitulus: from eastern Veracruz, eastern Oaxaca, and Chiapas in southern Mexico south into much of southern Guatemala; separately in western Honduras and extreme northern El Salvador
- B. b. subobscurus: central Honduras contiguous with scitulus

The golden-browed warbler primarily inhabits pine-oak forest and cloudforest with dense understories. Overall it ranges in elevation between about 1,250 and 3,500 m (4,100 and 11,500 ft). South of Mexico it ranges between 1,200 and 3,050 m (3,900 and 10,000 ft) but mostly occurs above 2,000 m (6,600 ft).

== Behavior ==
=== Movement ===
The golden-browed warbler is a sedentary year-round resident.

=== Feeding ===
The golden-browed warbler's diet has not been studied but is believed to be primarily insects and other arthropods. Pairs or small family groups forage low in the understory, taking most food by gleaning from vegetation. It seldom joins mixed-species feeding flocks.

=== Breeding ===
The golden-browed warbler breeds mostly between March and July, and pairs remain in their territory year-round. Nothing else is known about the species' breeding biology.

=== Vocalization ===
One description of the golden-browed warbler's song is "a rapid series of high-pitched notes on various pitches, but often upslurred at end" and of its call "a high, drawn-out bzweeech with slight upward inflection". For Guatemala and Honduras it is described as "a rich warble with several repeated elements, three'three'three'two'two'three'three'tzee'tzee'two'tzee!" and its call as "a sharp, high-pitched seet!".

== Status ==
The IUCN has assessed the golden-browed warbler as being of Least Concern. It has a very large range; its estimated population of at least 50,000 mature individuals is believed to be decreasing. No immediate threats have been identified. It is considered fairly common to common overall and locally fairly common south of Mexico.
