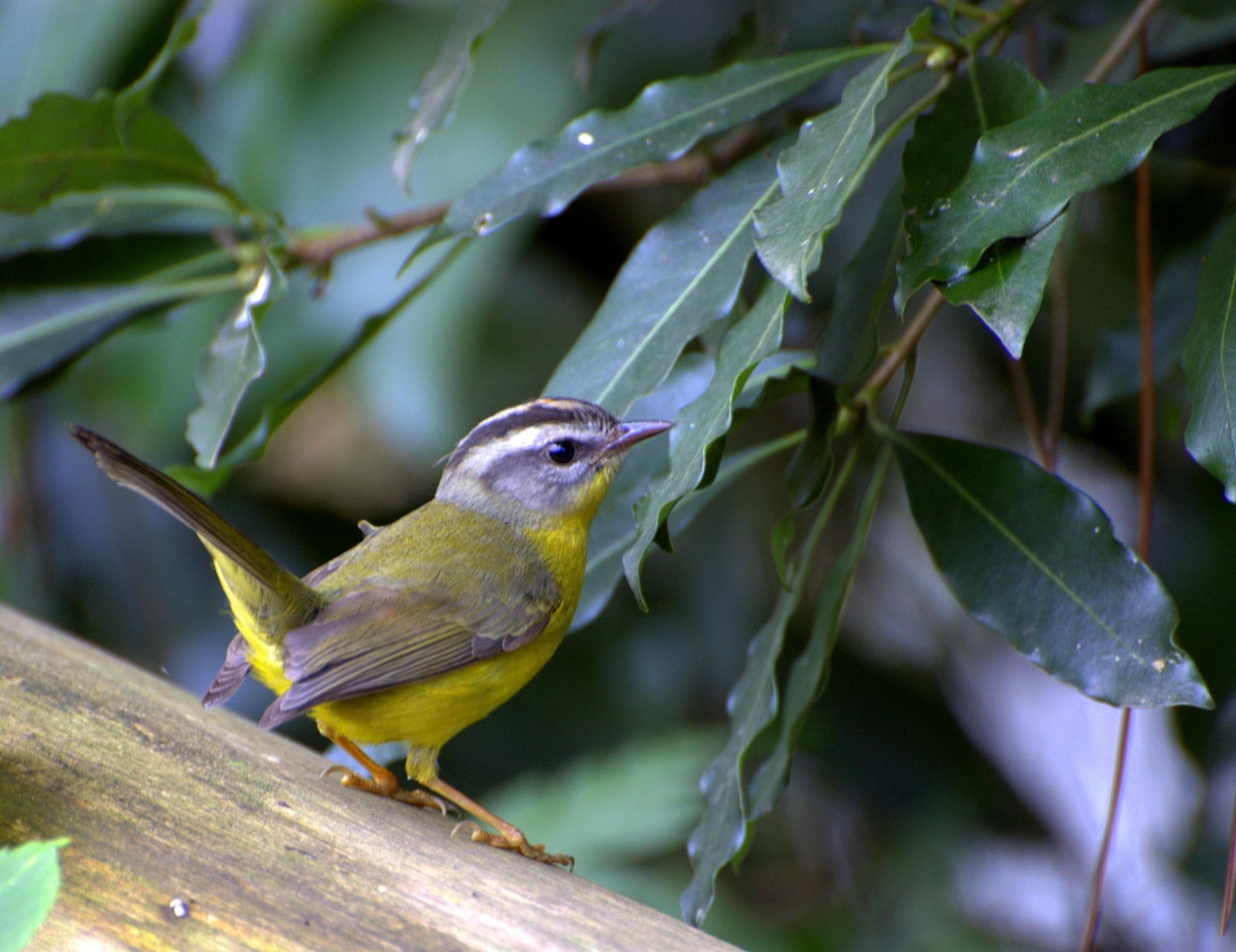
- Golden-crowned warbler (Basileuterus culicivorus)

Scientific classification
- Kingdom: Animalia
- Phylum: Chordata
- Class: Aves
- Order: Passeriformes
- Family: Parulidae
- Genus: Basileuterus; Cabanis, 1849

Type species
- Basileuterus vermivorus Cabanis, 1849 = Setophaga auricapilla Swainson, 1838 = Basileuterus culicivorus auricapilla

Species
- Many, see text

= Basileuterus =

Genus of birds

Basileuterus is a genus of New World warblers, best represented in Central and South America. This is one of only two warbler genera that are well represented in the latter continent. Some species formerly considered in this genus are now placed in the genus Myiothlypis. It is likely that the ancestors of this genus colonised South America from the family's heartland in northern Central America even before the two continents were linked, and subsequent speciation provided most of the resident warbler species of that region.

These are mainly robust warblers with a stout bill. The majority of species have olive or grey upperparts and yellow underparts. The head is often strikingly marked with a long broad supercilium, a coloured crown or crown stripes, and often other striking head markings.

Many species are not well-studied, but those for which the breeding habits are known all build a domed nest on a bank or on the ground, so this is presumably typical of the genus as a whole.

== Taxonomy ==
The genus Basileuterus was introduced in 1848 by the German ornithologist Jean Cabanis to accommodate a single species, Basileuterus vermivorus Cabanis. This is a junior synonym of Setophaga auricapilla Swainson, now treated as a subspecies of the golden-crowned warbler. The genus name is from an Ancient Greek bird name βασιλευτερος/basileuteros meaning "more kingly".

Formerly, the two members of the genus Phaeothlypis were sometimes included in Basileuterus.

=== Species ===
The genus contains the following 11 species.

Image	Common name	Scientific name	Distribution
	Rufous-capped warbler	Basileuterus rufifrons	Mexico to centra Guatemala
	Chestnut-capped warbler	Basileuterus delattrii	south Guatemala to north Colombia and west Venezuela
	Black-cheeked warbler	Basileuterus melanogenys	Costa Rica and west Panama
	Pirre warbler	Basileuterus ignotus	east Panama and northwest Colombia
	Golden-browed warbler	Basileuterus belli	Mexico to Honduras
	Golden-crowned warbler	Basileuterus culicivorus	Mexico and south through Central America to northeastern Argentina and Uruguay, and on Trinidad
	Black-eared warbler	Basileuterus melanotis	Costa Rica and west Panama
	Tacarcuna warbler	Basileuterus tacarcunae	east Panama and northwest Colombia
	Three-banded warbler	Basileuterus trifasciatus	Ecuador and Peru
	Yungas warbler	Basileuterus punctipectus	southeast Peru to south-central Bolivia
	Three-striped warbler	Basileuterus tristriatus	Venezuela to central Peru
