= List of birds of South America =

This is a list of bird species recorded in South America. South America is the "Bird Continent": It boasts records of 3513 species, more than any other. (Much larger Eurasia is second with 3473.) Colombia's list alone numbers 1915 confirmed species, and both Brazil's and Peru's confirmed lists exceed 1860. Of the continent's species, 2554 are endemic, significantly more than Eurasia's approximately 2300. Nine entire families, containing 21 species, are endemic to the continent.

Of the 2554 endemic species, 242 are found only in Brazil and 338 are only in one of 12 other countries and territories. Seventeen of the 3514 total species have been introduced to South America. In addition, 107 of the species are vagrants to the continent, with only a few records, and some have made only a single appearance. Twenty-nine species have been recorded in all 18 countries and territories addressed here.

The list includes birds confirmed in mainland South America, islands within 1200 km of its Atlantic and Pacific coasts, and the Caribbean countries and territories of Aruba, Bonaire, Curaçao, and Trinidad and Tobago. Major offshore entities include the Falkland Islands (Islas las Malvinas), the Galápagos Islands, and the Juan Fernandez Islands. Waters within 200 nautical miles of these lands are also included.

Unless otherwise noted, the list of species is that of the South American Classification Committee (SACC). The list's taxonomy (names and sequence of orders, families, and species) is also that of the SACC unless noted otherwise. Capitalization within English names follows Wikipedia practice, i.e. only the first word of a name is capitalized unless a place name such as São Paulo is used. The list does not include domestic birds or escaped and introduced species which do not have established populations. It also does not include the results of species splits and other changes which have been accepted by the SACC but not finalized. It does include four species from other sources that are not included in the above counts; these reports have not been confirmed by the SACC.

The following tags annotate many species:

- (E-SA) - Endemic to South America and present in more than one country (1974 species)
- (E-AR) - Endemic to Argentina (18 species)
- (E-BO) - Endemic to Bolivia (16 species)
- (E-BR) - Endemic to Brazil (242 species)
- (E-CH) - Endemic to Chile (12 species)
- (E-CO) - Endemic to Colombia (86 species)
- (E-EC) - Endemic to mainland Ecuador (8 species)
- (E-GA) - Endemic to the Galápagos Islands of Ecuador (29 species)
- (E-FA) - Endemic to the Falkland Islands (2 species)
- (E-FG) - Endemic to French Guiana (1 species)
- (E-PE) - Endemic to Peru (119 species)
- (E-SU) - Endemic to Suriname (1 species)
- (E-TT) - Endemic to Trinidad and Tobago (2 species)
- (E-VE) - Endemic to Venezuela (44 species)
- (V) - Vagrant to South America or the islands included in this list
- (I) - Introduced to South America and established there
- (UC) - Unconfirmed by the SACC
- (All) - Recorded in all 18 countries and territories

== Rheas ==
Order: Rheiiformes Family: Rheidae

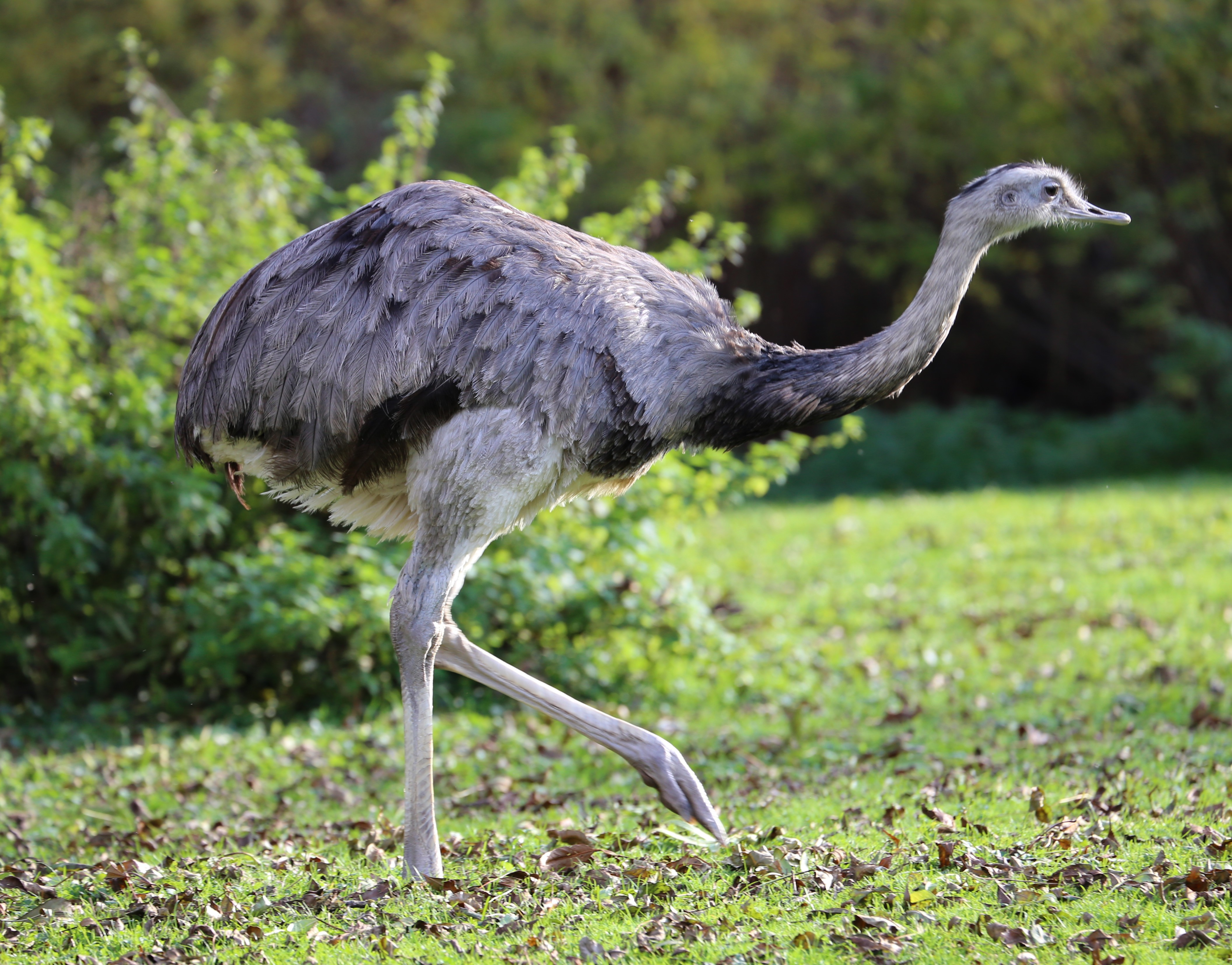
Greater rhea

Rheas are large flightless birds native to South America. Their feet have three toes rather than four which allows them to run faster.

- Greater rhea, Rhea americana (E-SA)
- Lesser rhea, Pterocnemia pennata (E-SA)

== Tinamous ==
Order: Tinamiformes Family: Tinamidae

The tinamous are one of the most ancient groups of bird. Although they look similar to other ground-dwelling birds like quail and grouse, they have no close relatives and are classified as a single family, Tinamidae, within their own order, the Tinamiformes.

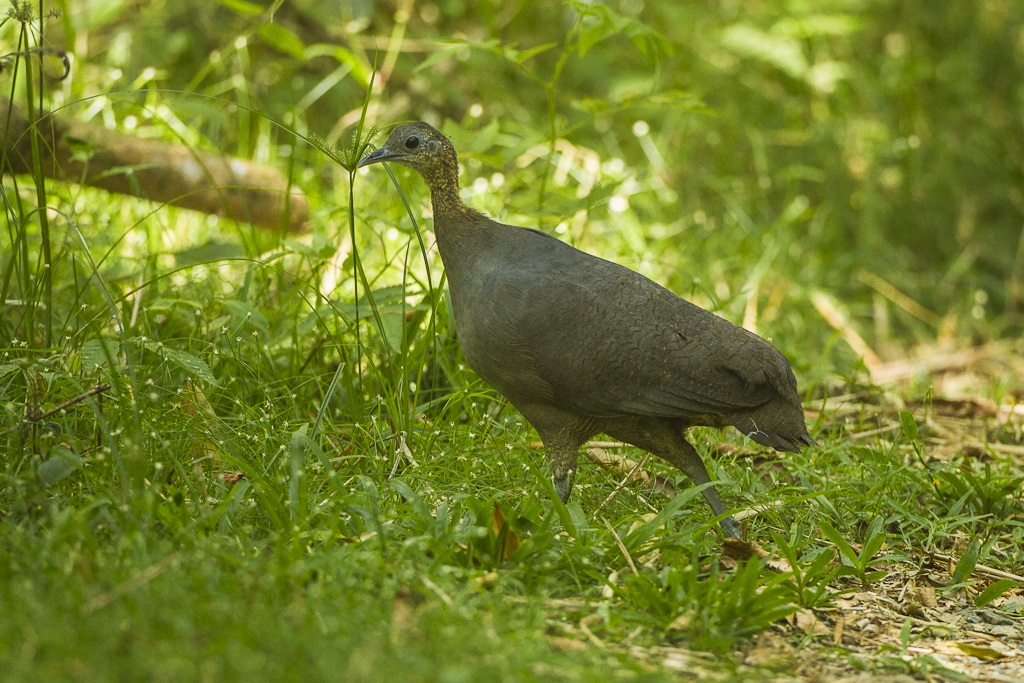
Solitary tinamou

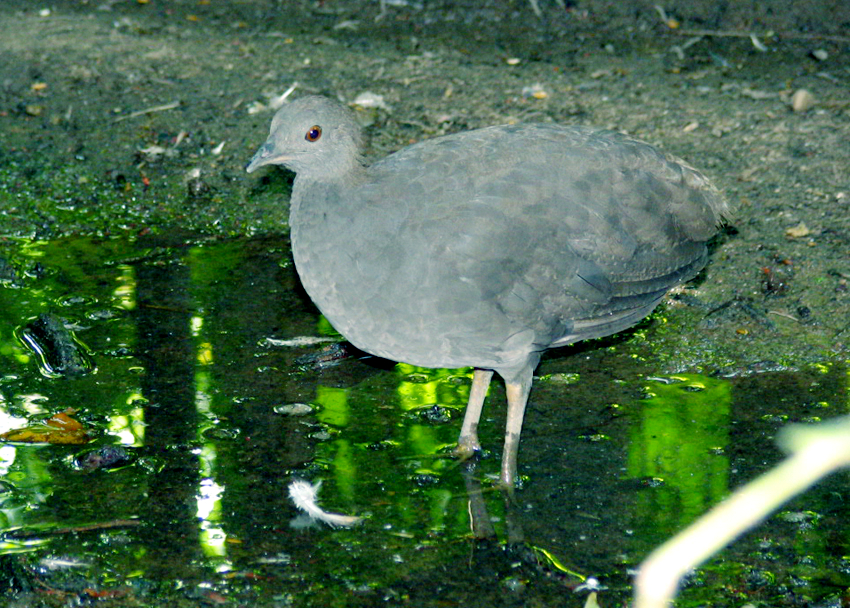
Cinereous tinamou

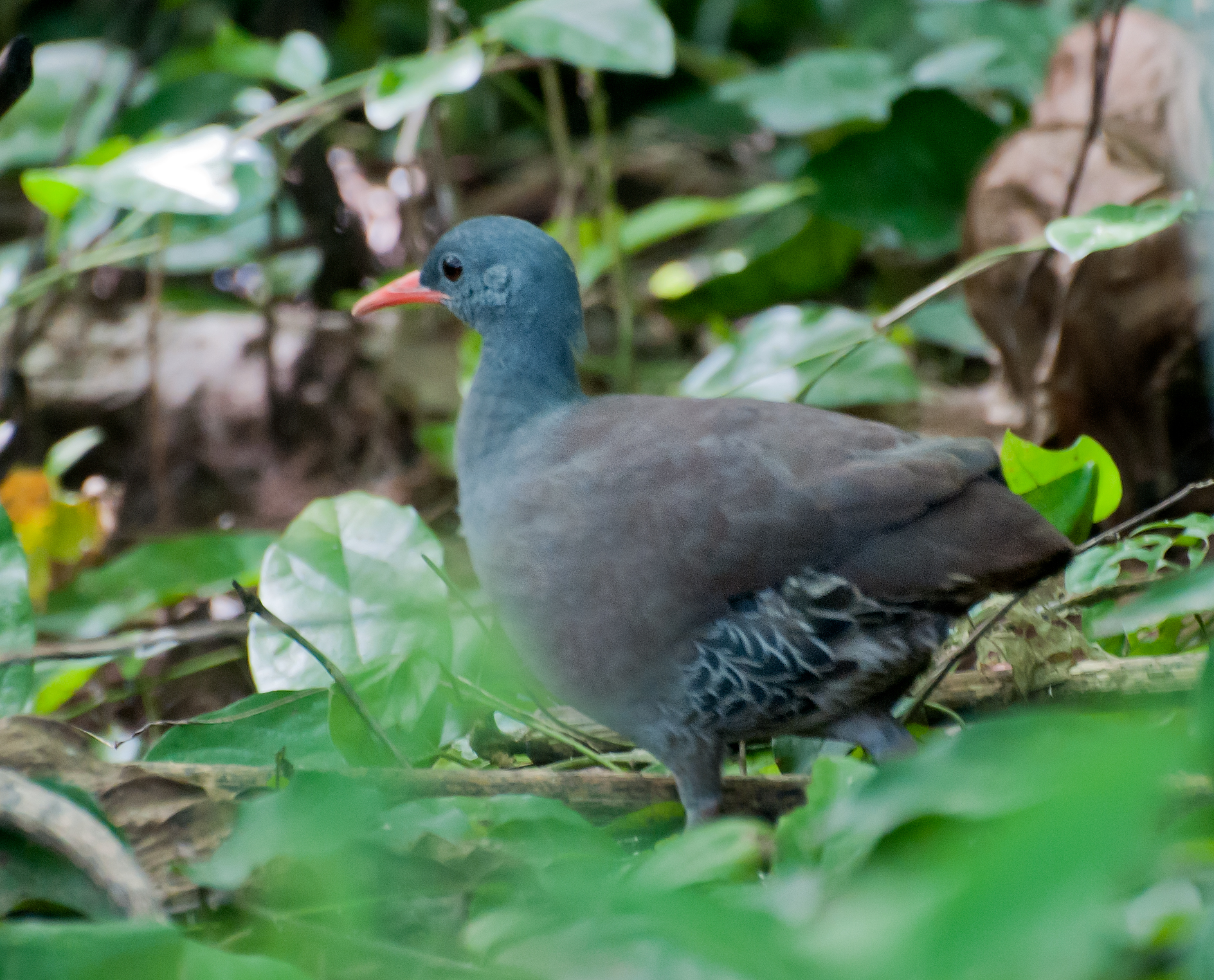
Tataupa tinamou

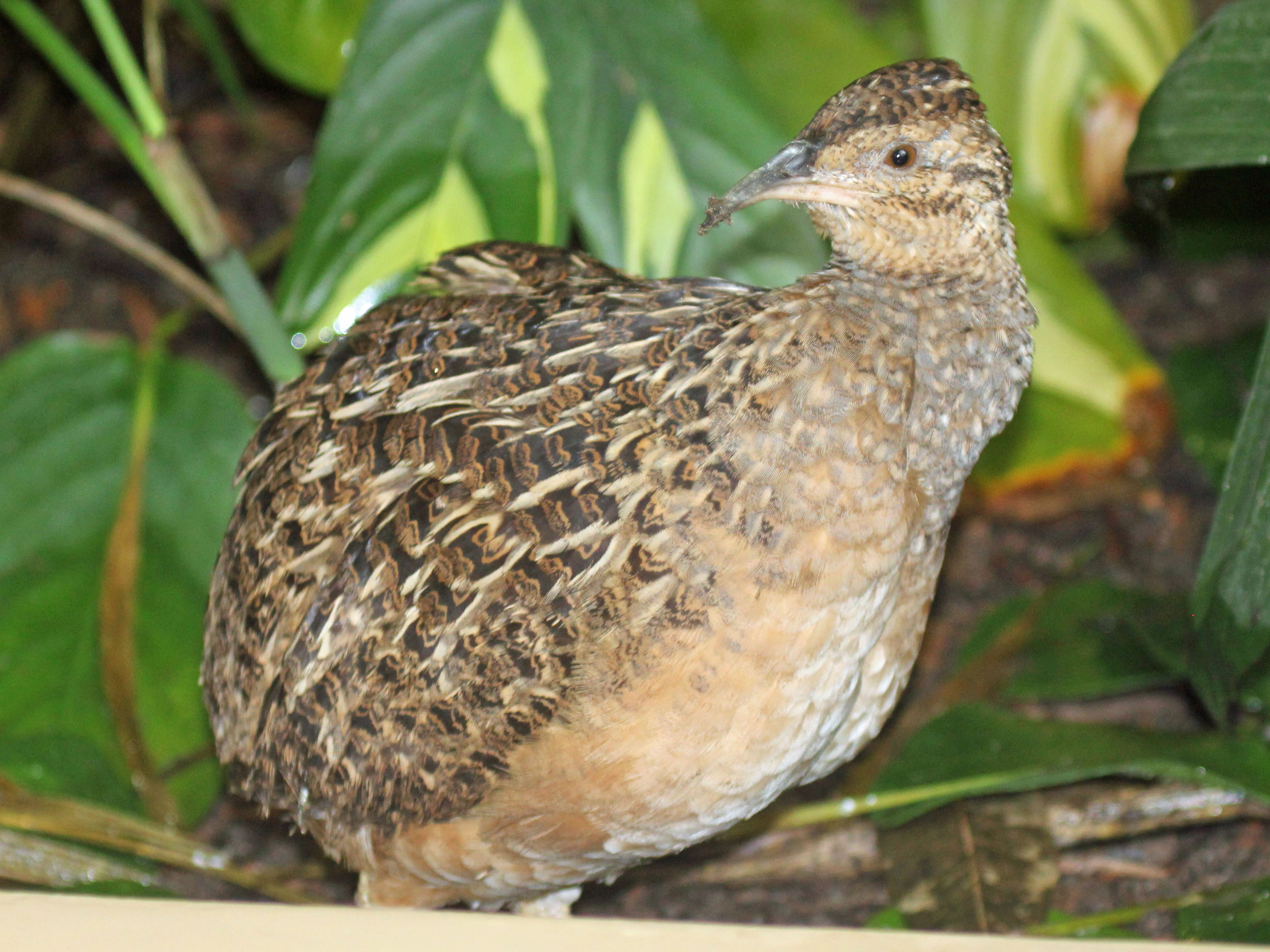
Andean tinamou

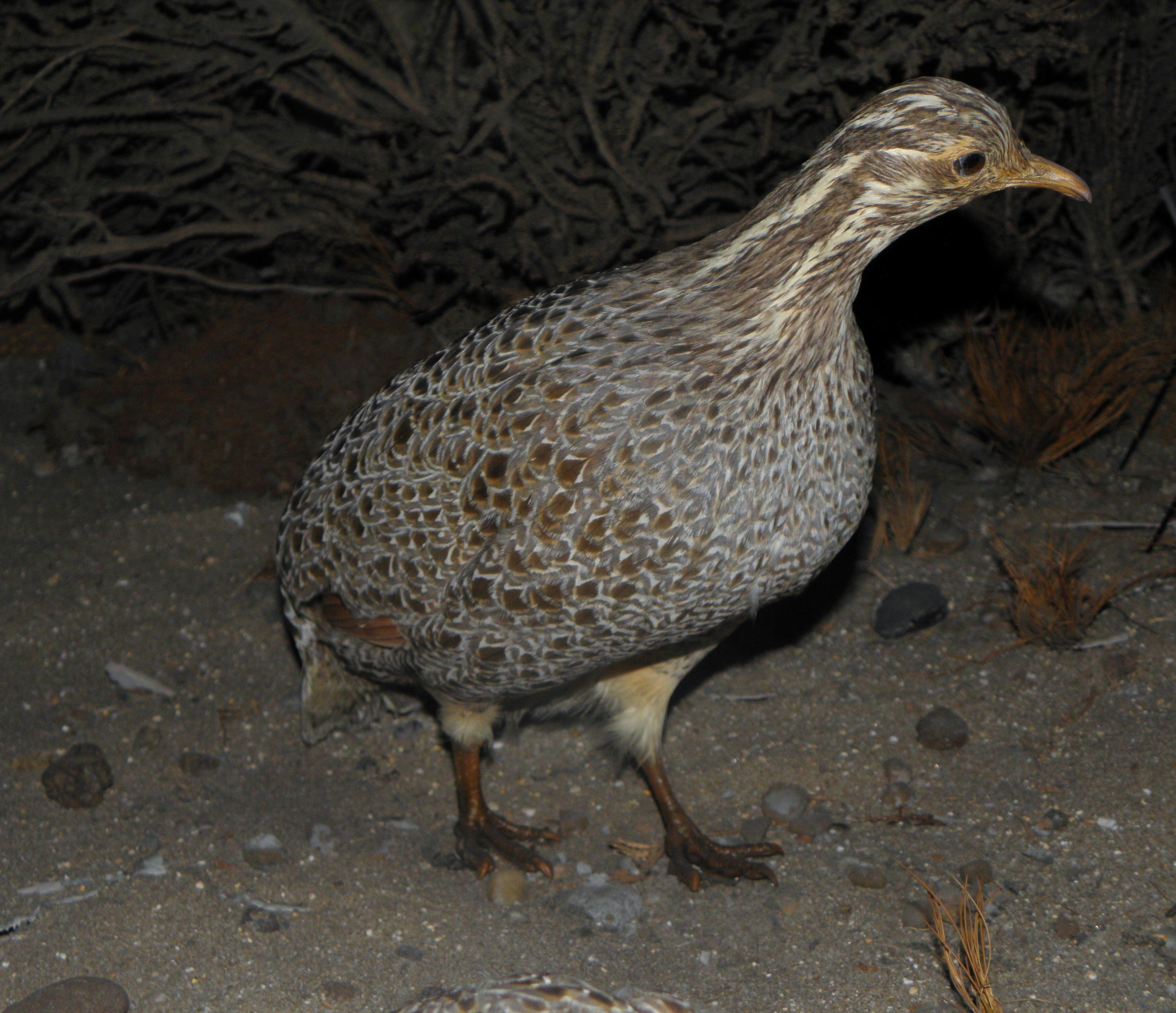
Patagonian tinamou
- Tawny-breasted tinamou, Nothocercus julius (E-SA)
- Highland tinamou, Nothocercus bonapartei
- Hooded tinamou, Nothocercus nigrocapillus (E-SA)
- Gray tinamou, Tinamus tao (E-SA)
- Solitary tinamou, Tinamus solitarius (E-SA)
- Black tinamou, Tinamus osgoodi (E-SA)
- Great tinamou, Tinamus major
- White-throated tinamou, Tinamus guttatus (E-SA)
- Berlepsch's tinamou, Crypturellus berlepschi (E-SA)
- Cinereous tinamou, Crypturellus cinereus (E-SA)
- Little tinamou, Crypturellus soui
- Slaty-masked tinamou, Crypturellus resonans (E-BR)
- Tepui tinamou, Crypturellus ptaritepui (E-SA)
- Brown tinamou, Crypturellus obsoletus (E-SA)
- Undulated tinamou, Crypturellus undulatus (E-SA)
- Pale-browed tinamou, Crypturellus transfasciatus (E-SA)
- Brazilian tinamou, Crypturellus strigulosus (E-SA)
- Gray-legged tinamou, Crypturellus duidae (E-SA)
- Red-legged tinamou, Crypturellus erythropus (E-SA)
- Yellow-legged tinamou, Crypturellus noctivagus (E-BR)
- Black-capped tinamou, Crypturellus atrocapillus (E-SA)
- Choco tinamou, Crypturellus kerriae
- Variegated tinamou, Crypturellus variegatus (E-SA)
- Rusty tinamou, Crypturellus brevirostris (E-SA)
- Bartlett's tinamou, Crypturellus bartletti (E-SA)
- Small-billed tinamou, Crypturellus parvirostris
- Barred tinamou, Crypturellus casiquiare (E-SA)
- Tataupa tinamou, Crypturellus tataupa (E-SA)
- Red-winged tinamou, Rhynchotus rufescens (E-SA)
- Huayco tinamou, Rhynchotus maculicollis (E-SA)
- Taczanowski's tinamou, Nothoprocta taczanowskii (E-SA)
- Ornate tinamou, Nothoprocta ornata (E-SA)
- Chilean tinamou, Nothoprocta perdicaria (E-CH)
- Brushland tinamou, Nothoprocta cinerascens (E-SA)
- Andean tinamou, Nothoprocta pentlandii (E-SA)
- Curve-billed tinamou, Nothoprocta curvirostris (E-SA)
- White-bellied nothura, Nothura boraquira (E-SA)
- Lesser nothura, Nothura minor (E-SA)
- Darwin's nothura, Nothura darwinii (E-SA)
- Spotted nothura, Nothura maculosa (E-SA)
- Dwarf tinamou, Taoniscus nanus (E-SA)
- Elegant crested-tinamou, Eudromia elegans (E-SA)
- Quebracho crested-tinamou, Eudromia formosa (E-SA)
- Puna tinamou, Tinamotis pentlandii (E-SA)
- Patagonian tinamou, Tinamotis ingoufi (E-SA)

== Screamers ==
Order: Anseriformes Family: Anhimidae

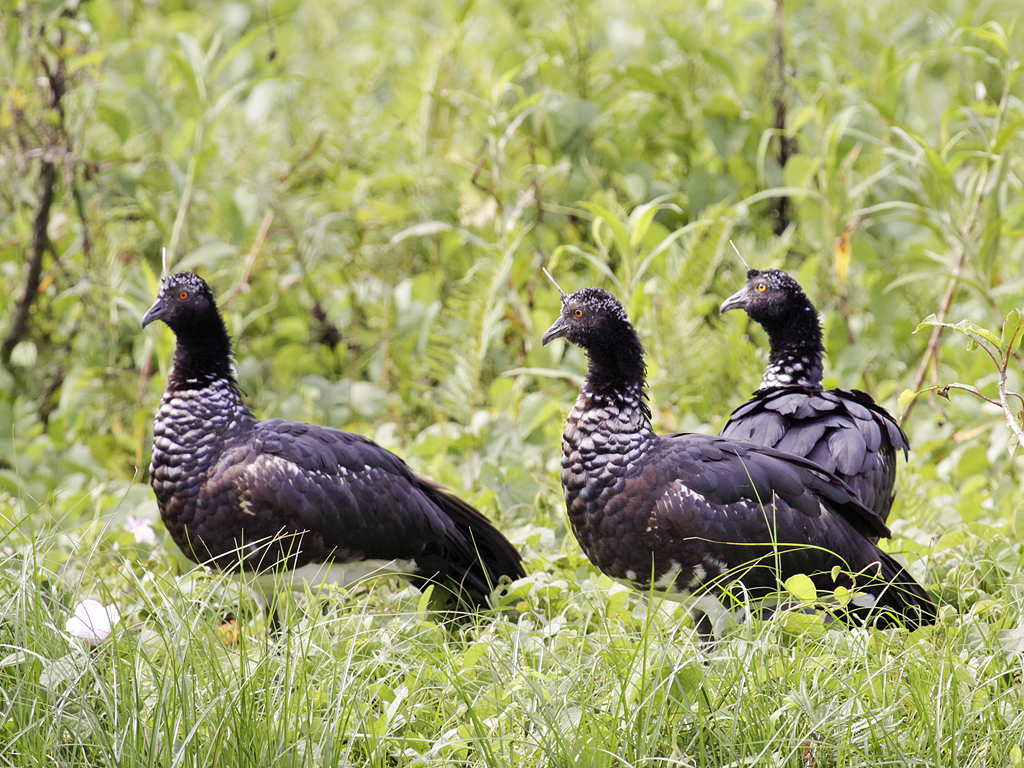
Horned screamers

The screamers are a small family of birds related to the ducks. They are large, bulky birds, with a small downy head, long legs, and large feet which are only partially webbed. They have large spurs on their wings which are used in fights over mates and in territorial disputes.

- Horned screamer, Anhima cornuta (E-SA)
- Southern screamer, Chauna torquata (E-SA)
- Northern screamer, Chauna chavaria (E-SA)

== Ducks ==
Order: Anseriformes Family: Anatidae

Anatidae includes the ducks and most duck-like waterfowl, such as geese and swans. These birds are adapted to an aquatic existence with webbed feet, flattened bills, and feathers that are excellent at shedding water due to an oily coating.

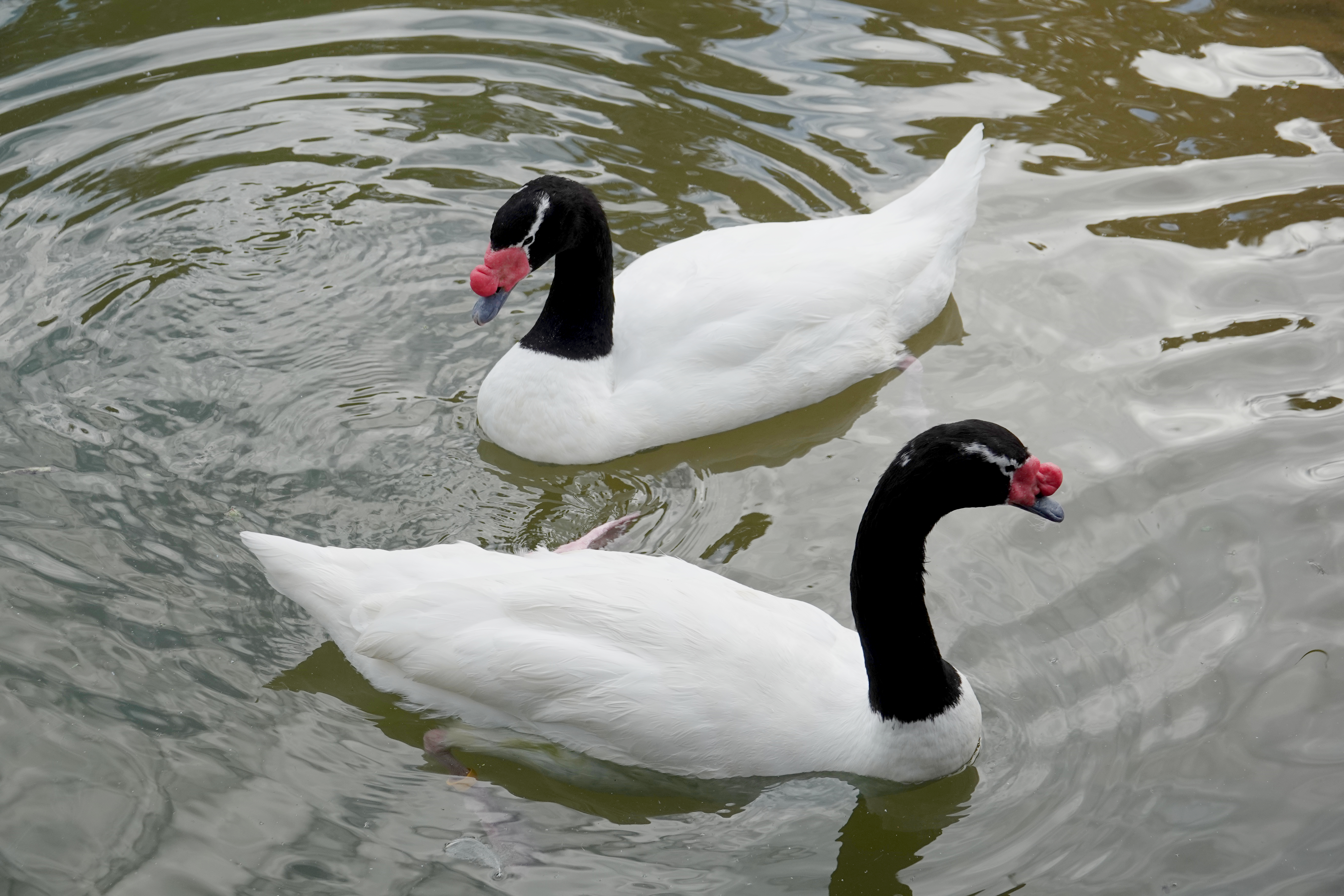
Black-necked swan

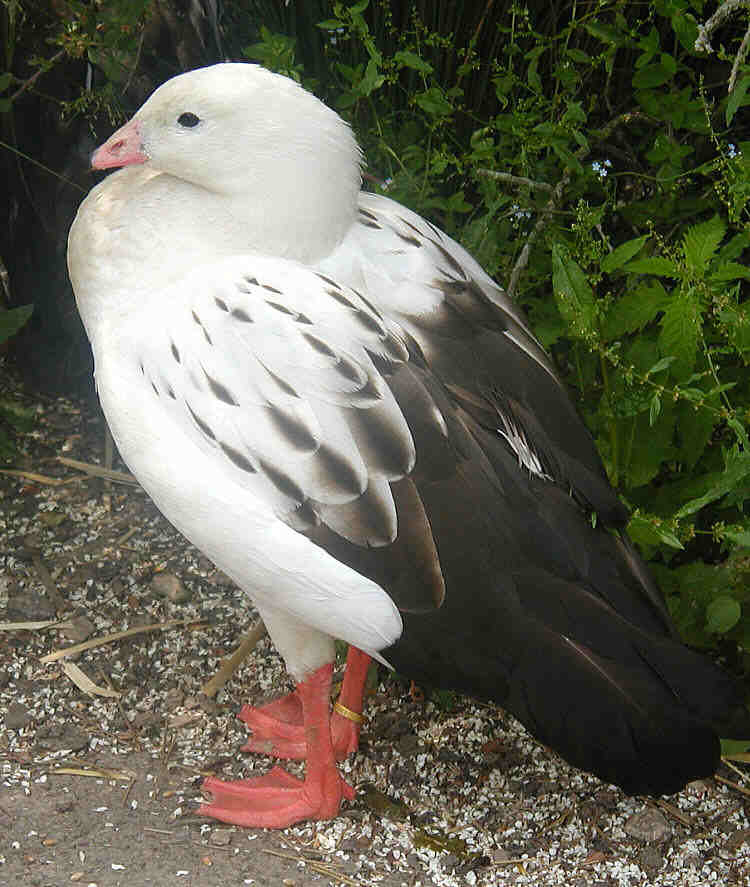
Andean goose

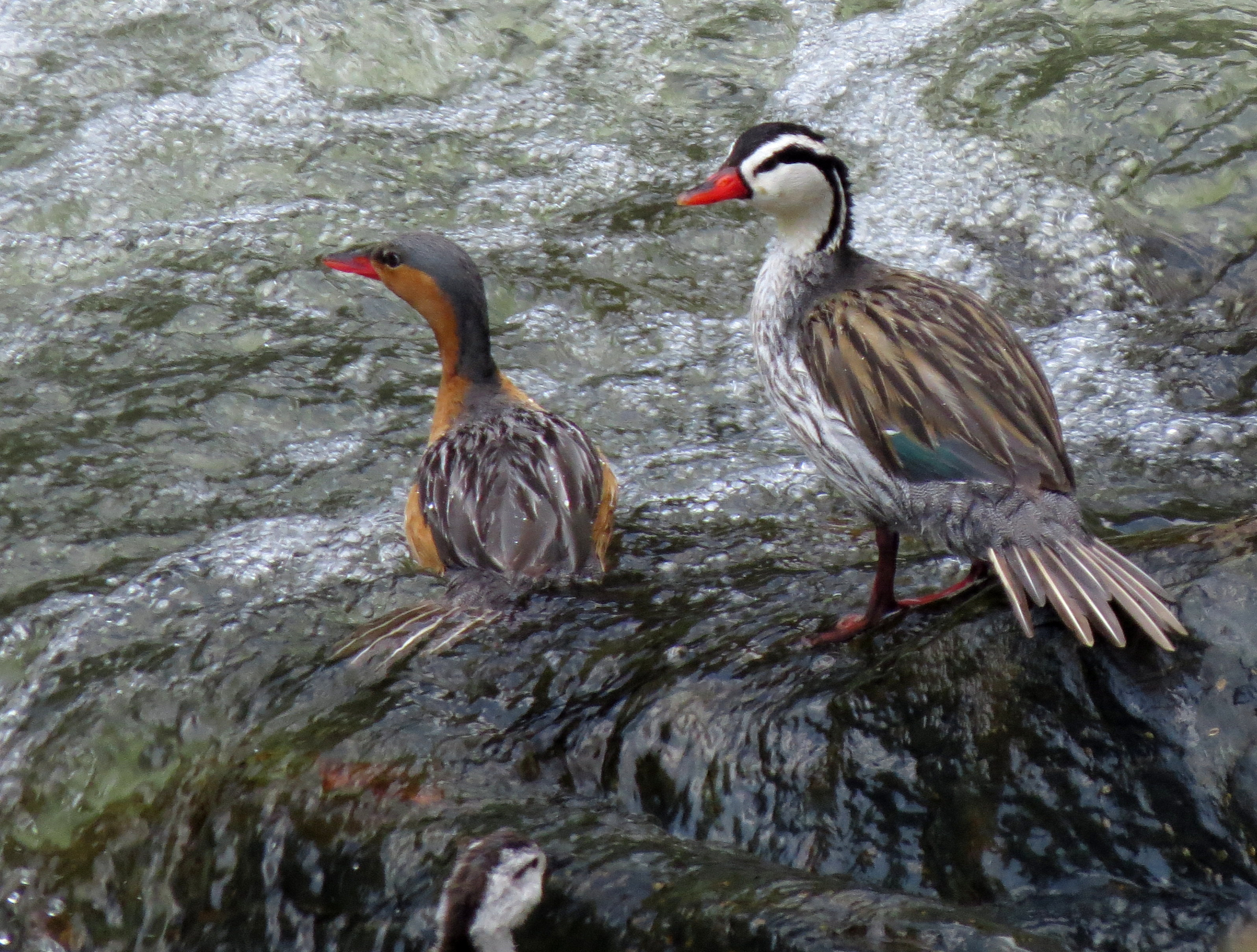
Torrent duck

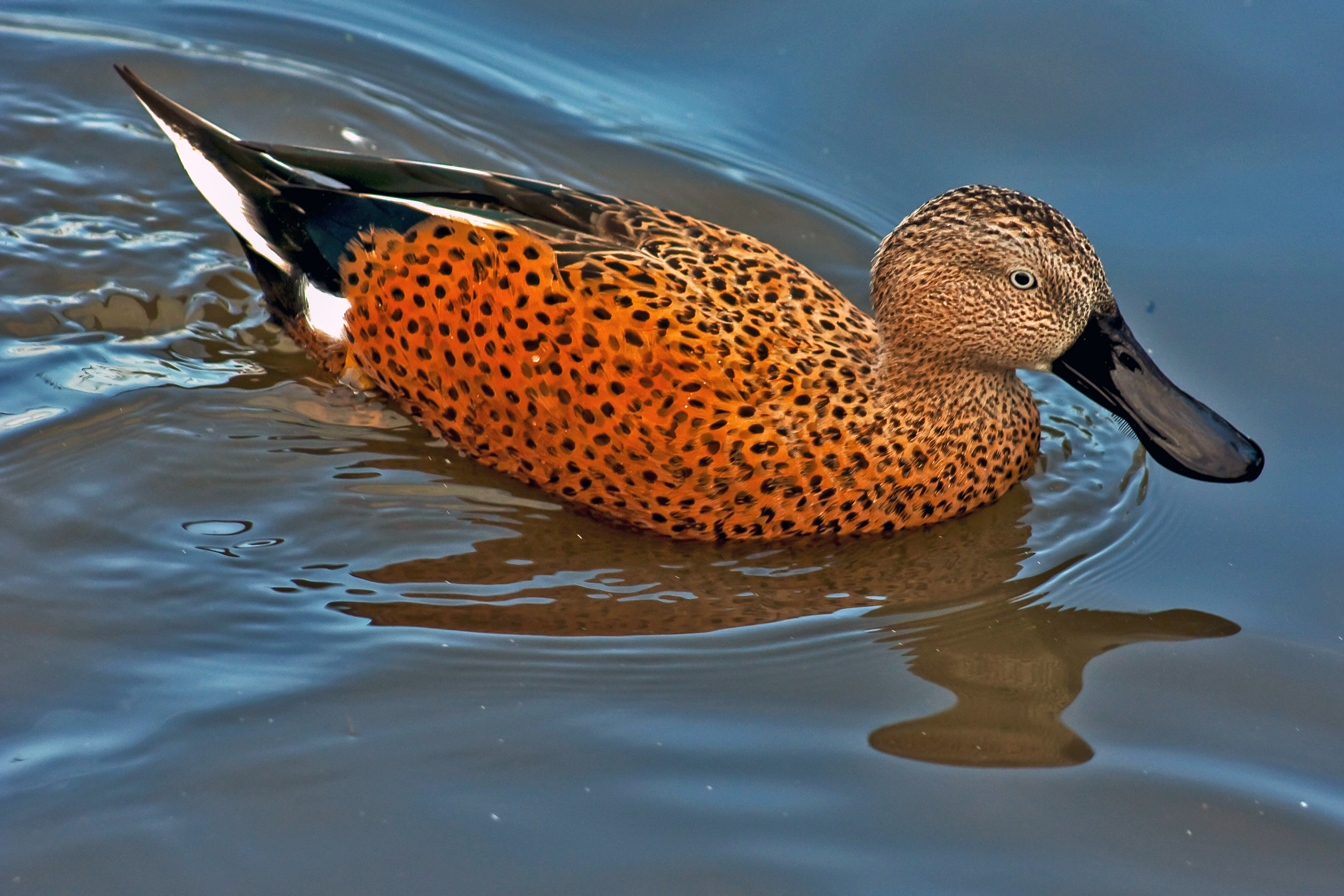
Red shoveler

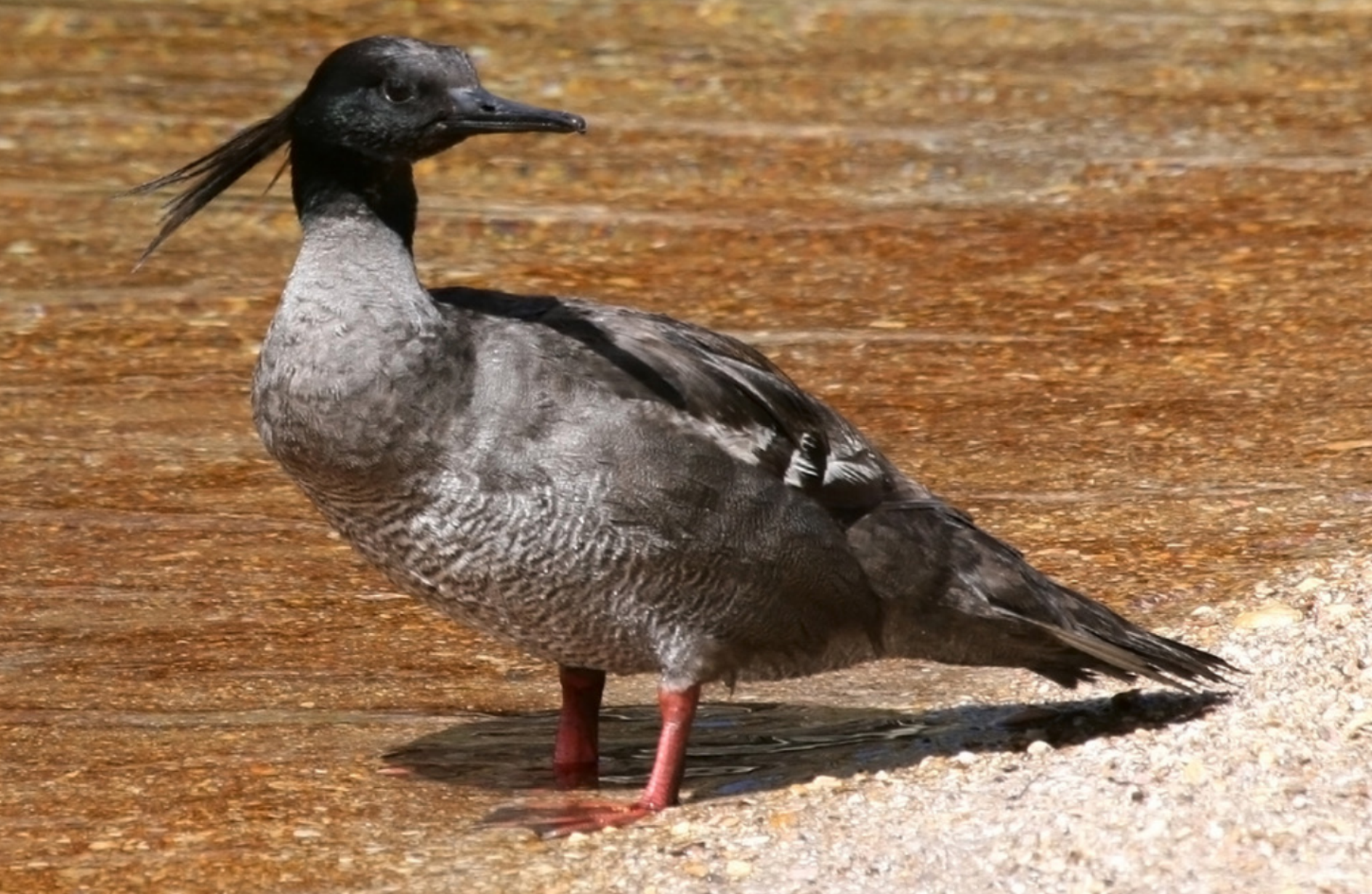
Brazilian merganser
- Fulvous whistling-duck, Dendrocygna bicolor
- White-faced whistling-duck, Dendrocygna viduata
- Black-bellied whistling-duck, Dendrocygna autumnalis
- Graylag goose, Anser anser (I)
- Black-necked swan, Cygnus melancoryphus (E-SA)
- Coscoroba swan, Coscoroba coscoroba (E-SA)
- Orinoco goose, Oressochen jubatus (E-SA)
- Andean goose, Oressochen melanopterus (E-SA)
- Upland goose, Chloephaga picta (E-SA)
- Kelp goose, Chloephaga hybrida (E-SA)
- Ashy-headed goose, Chloephaga poliocephala (E-SA)
- Ruddy-headed goose, Chloephaga rubidiceps (E-SA)
- Muscovy duck, Cairina moschata
- Comb duck, Sarkidiornis sylvicola
- Ringed teal, Callonetta leucophrys (E-SA)
- Brazilian teal, Amazonetta brasiliensis (E-SA)
- Torrent duck, Merganetta armata (E-SA)
- Flying steamer-duck, Tachyeres patachonicus (E-SA)
- Flightless steamer-duck, Tachyeres pteneres (E-SA)
- Falkland steamer-duck, Tachyeres brachypterus (E-FA)
- White-headed steamer-duck, Tachyeres leucocephalus (E-AR)
- Crested duck, Lophonetta specularioides (E-SA)
- Spectacled duck, Speculanas specularis (E-SA)
- Puna teal, Spatula puna (E-SA)
- Silver teal, Spatula versicolor (E-SA)
- Red shoveler, Spatula platalea (E-SA)
- Northern shoveler, Spatula clypeata
- Blue-winged teal, Spatula discors
- Cinnamon teal, Spatula cyanoptera
- Eurasian wigeon, Mareca penelope (V)
- American wigeon, Mareca americana
- Chiloe wigeon, Mareca sibilatrix (E-SA)
- White-cheeked pintail, Anas bahamensis (All)
- Northern pintail, Anas acuta
- Yellow-billed pintail, Anas georgica
- Green-winged teal, Anas crecca (V)
- Andean teal, Anas andium (E-SA)
- Yellow-billed teal, Anas flavirostris (E-SA)
- Southern pochard, Netta erythrophthalma
- Rosy-billed pochard, Netta peposaca (E-SA)
- Ring-necked duck, Aythya collaris (V)
- Lesser scaup, Aythya affinis
- Brazilian merganser, Mergus octosetaceus (E-SA)
- Black-headed duck, Heteronetta atricapilla (E-SA)
- Masked duck, Nomonyx dominicus
- Ruddy duck, Oxyura jamaicensis
- Lake duck, Oxyura vittata (E-SA)

== Guans ==
Order: Galliformes Family: Cracidae

The Cracidae are large birds, similar in general appearance to turkeys. Guans and curassows live in trees, but the smaller chachalacas are found in more open scrubby habitats. They are generally dull-plumaged, but the curassows and some guans have colorful facial ornaments.

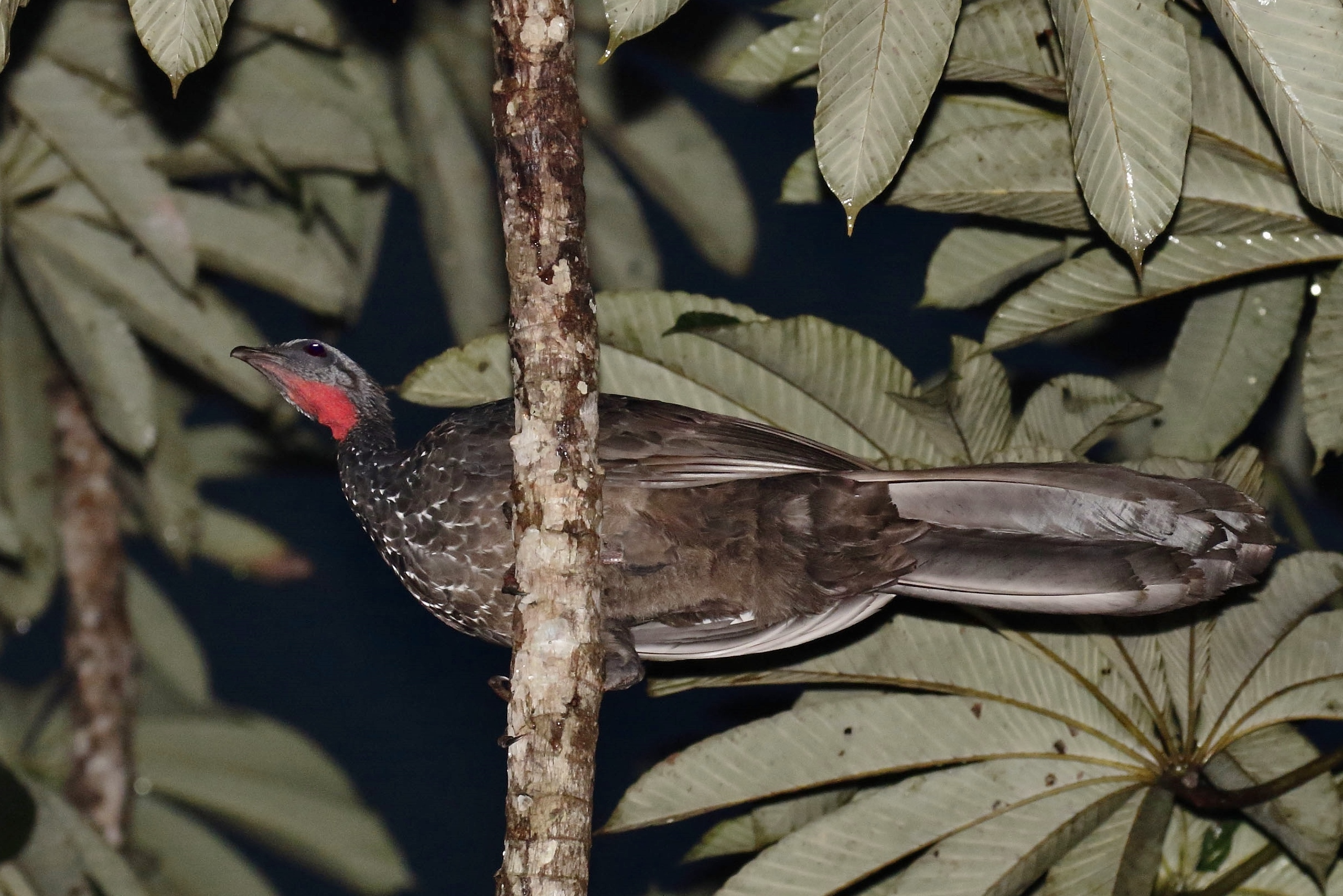
Marail guan

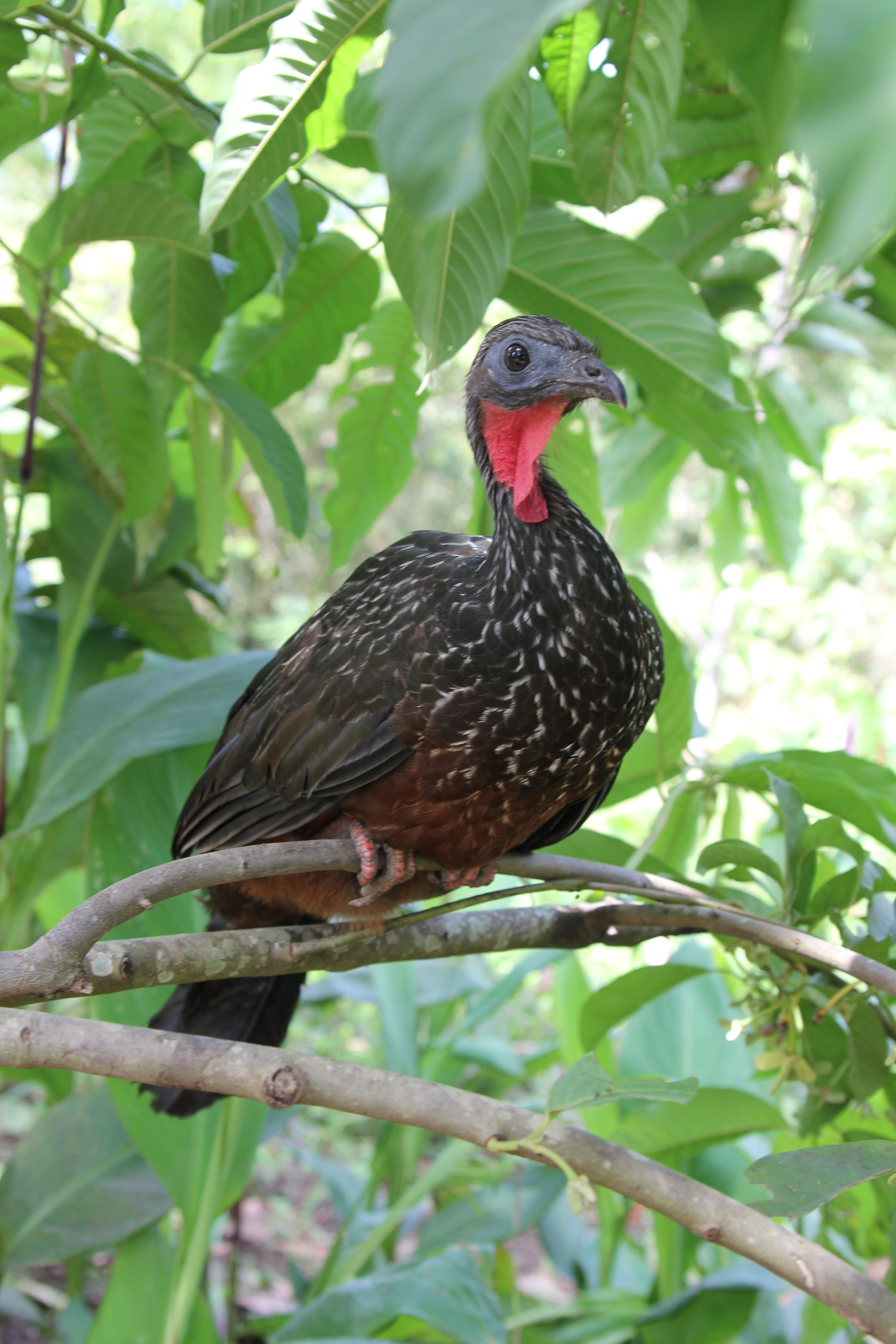
Spix's guan

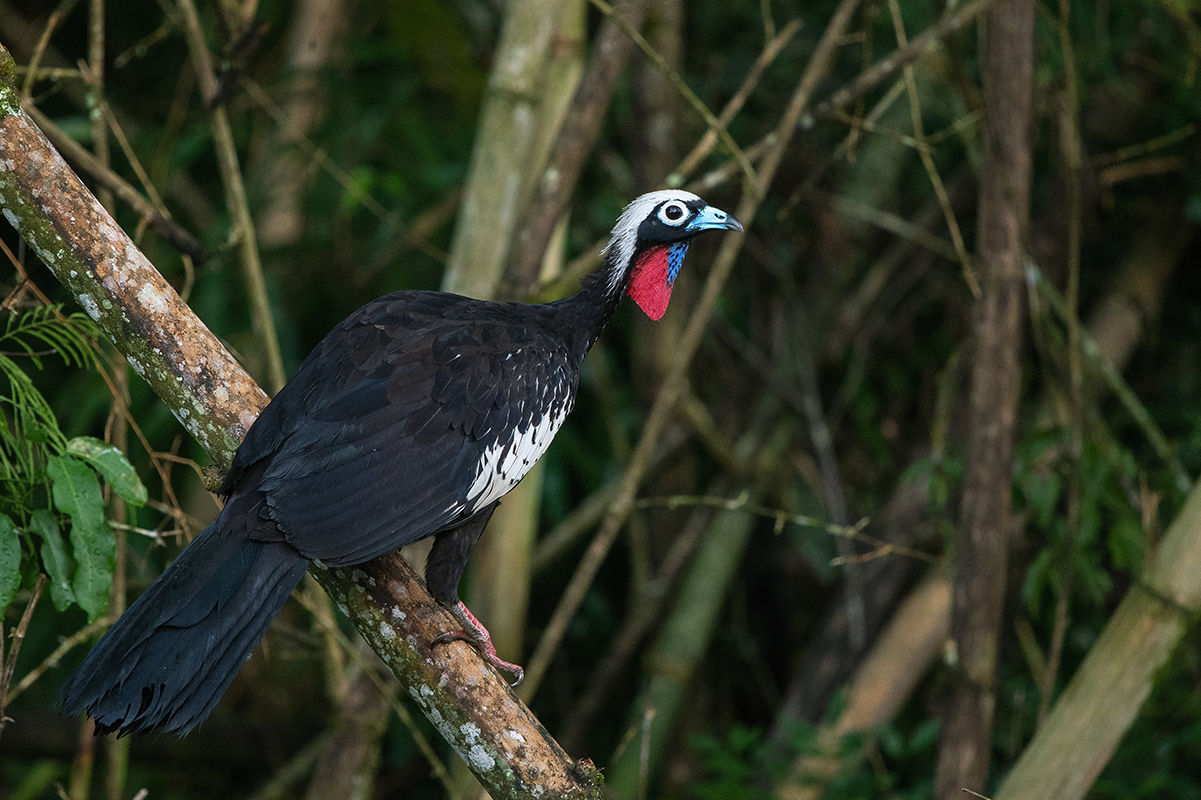
Black-fronted piping-guan

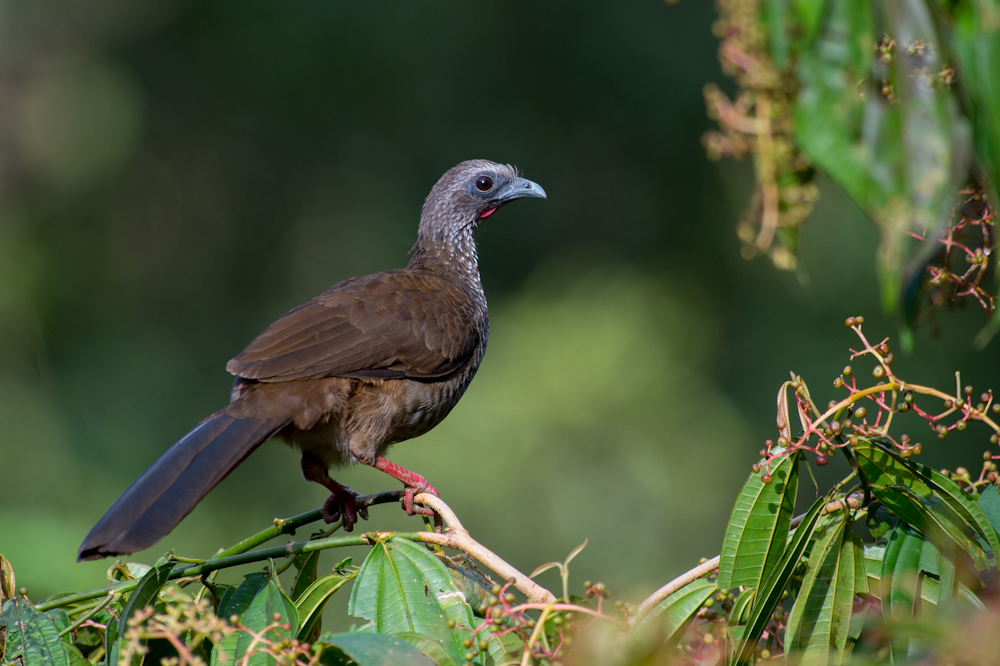
Speckled chachalaca

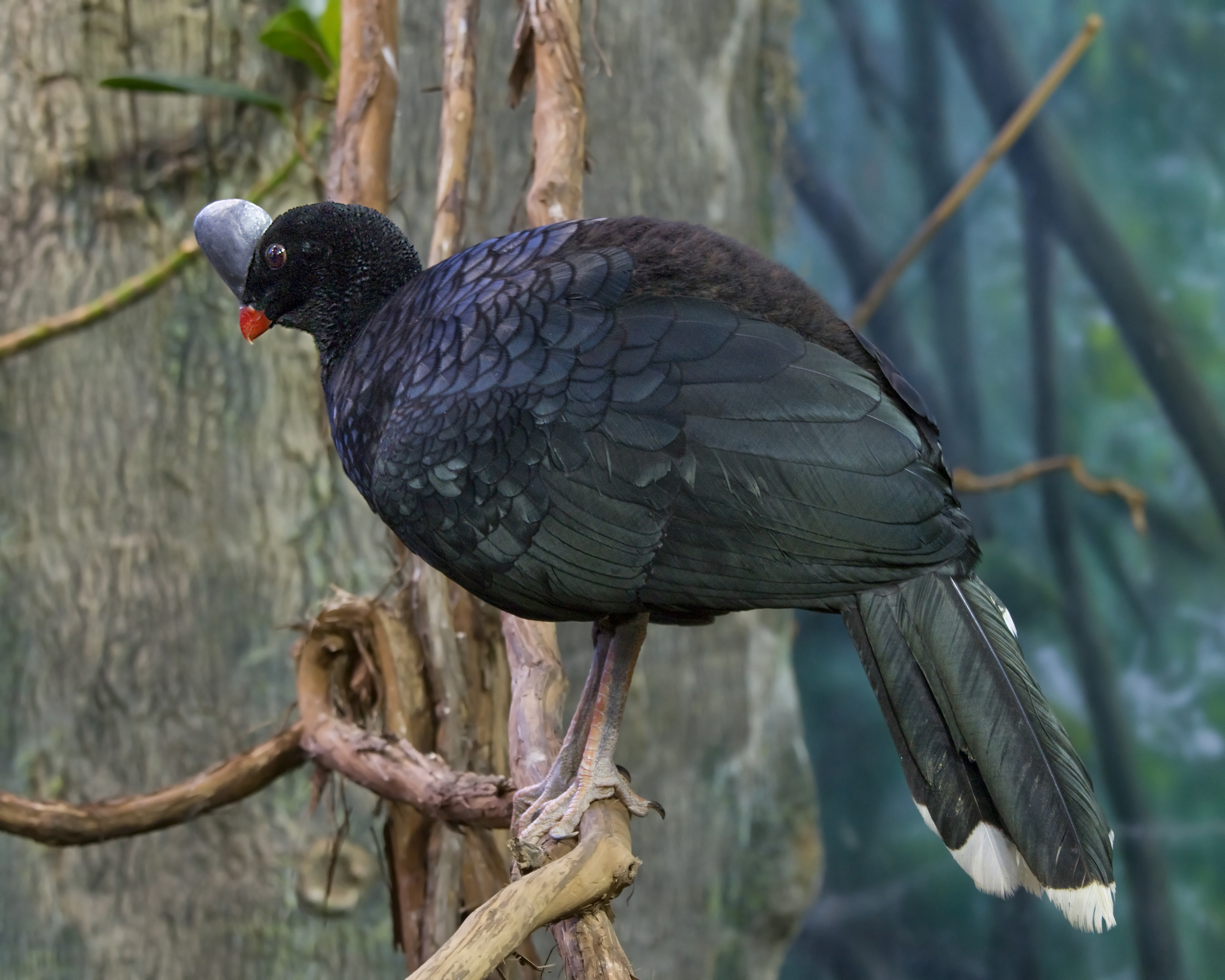
Helmeted curassow
- Sickle-winged guan, Chamaepetes goudotii (E-SA)
- Band-tailed guan, Penelope argyrotis (E-SA)
- Bearded guan, Penelope barbata (E-SA)
- Baudo guan, Penelope ortoni (E-SA)
- Andean guan, Penelope montagnii (E-SA)
- Marail guan, Penelope marail (E-SA)
- Rusty-margined guan, Penelope superciliaris (E-SA)
- Red-faced guan, Penelope dabbenei (E-SA)
- Spix's guan, Penelope jacquacu (E-SA)
- Crested guan, Penelope purpurascens
- Cauca guan, Penelope perspicax (E-CO)
- White-winged guan, Penelope albipennis (E-PE)
- Yungas guan, Penelope bridgesi (E-SA)
- Dusky-legged guan, Penelope obscura (E-SA)
- White-crested guan, Penelope pileata (E-BR)
- Chestnut-bellied guan, Penelope ochrogaster (E-BR)
- White-browed guan, Penelope jacucaca (E-BR)
- Trinidad piping-guan, Pipile pipile (E-TT)
- Blue-throated piping-guan, Pipile cumanensis (E-SA)
- Red-throated piping-guan, Pipile cujubi (E-SA)
- Black-fronted piping-guan, Pipile jacutinga (E-SA)
- Wattled guan, Aburria aburri (E-SA)
- Gray-headed chachalaca, Ortalis cinereiceps
- Chestnut-winged chachalaca, Ortalis garrula (E-CO)
- Rufous-vented chachalaca, Ortalis ruficauda (E-SA)
- Rufous-headed chachalaca, Ortalis erythroptera (E-SA)
- Chaco chachalaca, Ortalis canicollis (E-SA)
- Colombian chachalaca, Ortalis columbiana (E-CO)
- Speckled chachalaca, Ortalis guttata (E-SA)
- East Brazilian chachalaca, Ortalis araucuan (E-BR)
- Scaled chachalaca, Ortalis squamata (E-BR)
- Variable chachalaca, Ortalis motmot (E-SA)
- Chestnut-headed chachalaca, Ortalis ruficeps (E-BR)
- Buff-browed chachalaca, Ortalis superciliaris (E-BR)
- Nocturnal curassow, Nothocrax urumutum (E-SA)
- Great curassow, Crax rubra
- Blue-billed curassow, Crax alberti (E-CO)
- Yellow-knobbed curassow, Crax daubentoni (E-SA)
- Black curassow, Crax alector (E-SA)
- Wattled curassow, Crax globulosa (E-SA)
- Bare-faced curassow, Crax fasciolata (E-SA)
- Red-billed curassow, Crax blumenbachii (E-BR)
- Crestless curassow, Mitu tomentosum (E-SA)
- Salvin's curassow, Mitu salvini (E-SA)
- Razor-billed curassow, Mitu tuberosum (E-SA)
- Alagoas curassow, Mitu mitu (E-BR) (extinct in the wild)
- Helmeted curassow, Pauxi pauxi (E-SA)
- Sira curassow, Pauxi koepckeae (E-PE)
- Horned curassow, Pauxi unicornis (E-BO)

== New World quails ==
Order: Galliformes Family: Odontophoridae

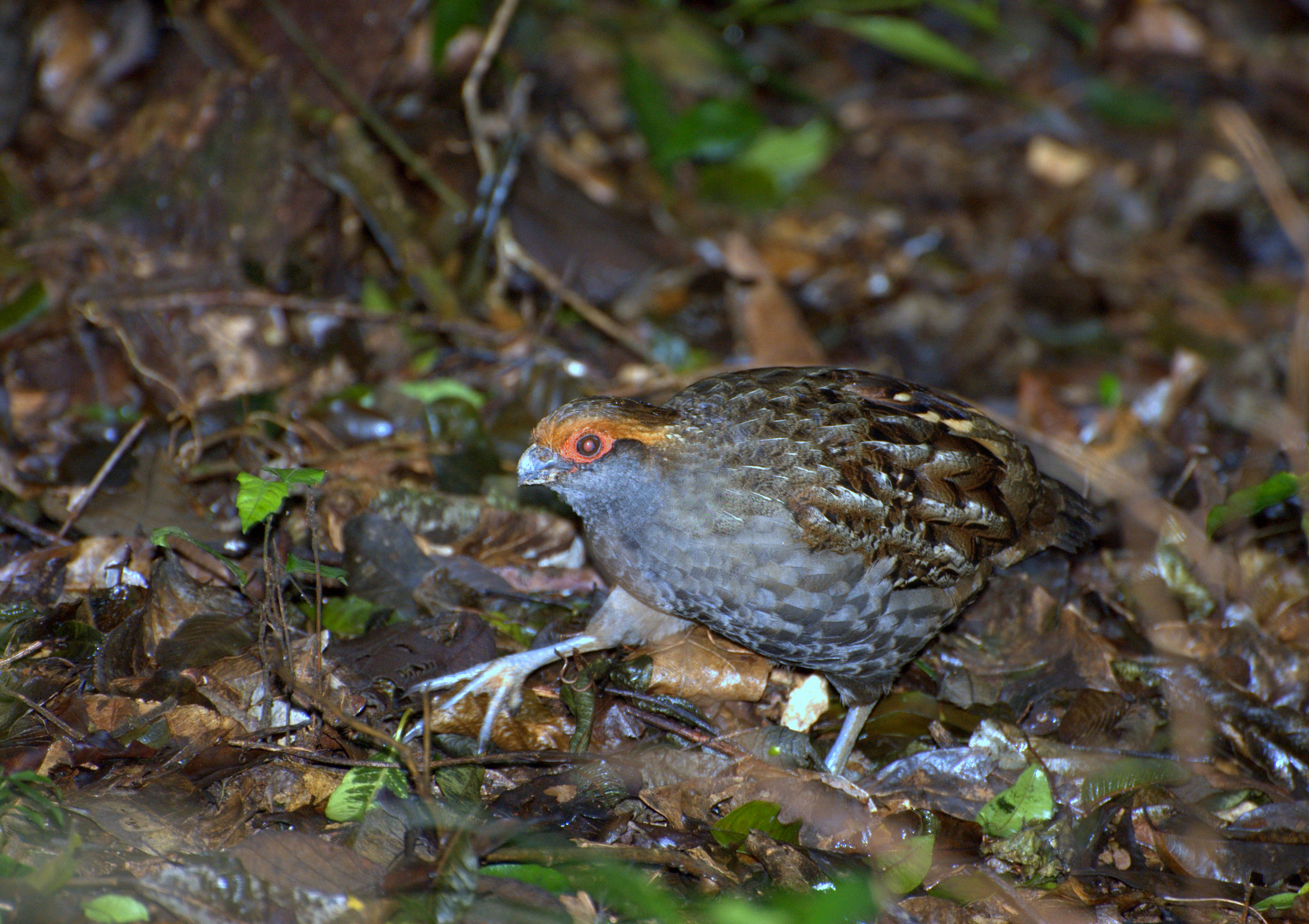
Spot-winged wood-quail

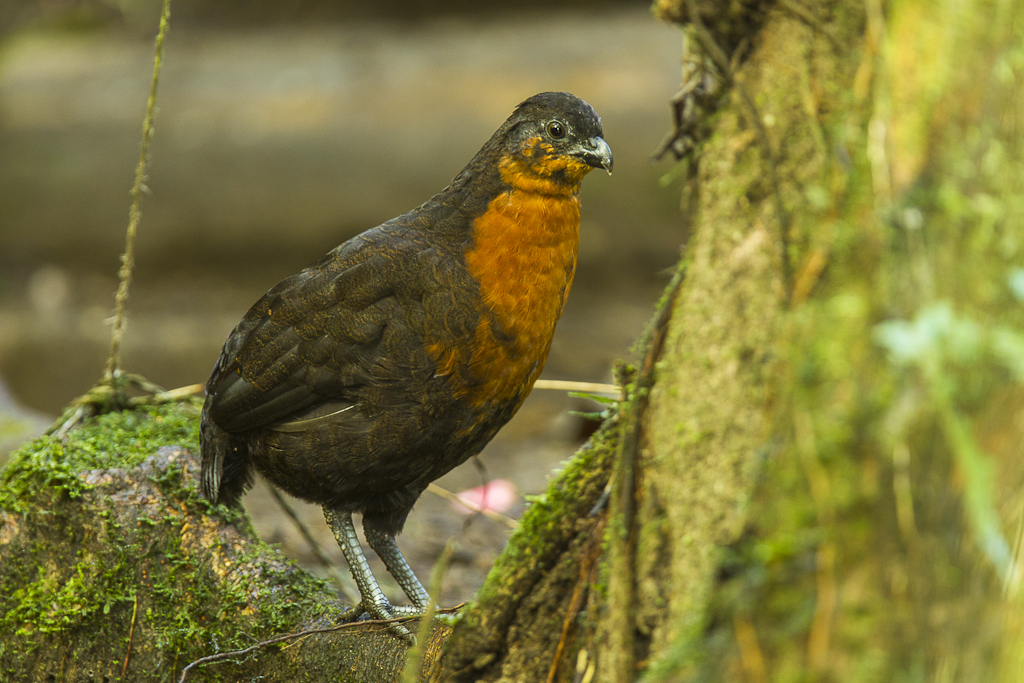
Dark-backed wood-quail

New World quail are small, plump terrestrial birds only distantly related to the quails of the Old World, but named for their similar appearance and habits.

- Tawny-faced quail, Rhynchortyx cinctus
- Crested bobwhite, Colinus cristatus
- California quail, Callipepla californica (I)
- Marbled wood-quail, Odontophorus gujanensis
- Spot-winged wood-quail, Odontophorus capueira (E-SA)
- Black-fronted wood-quail, Odontophorus atrifrons (E-SA)
- Rufous-fronted wood-quail, Odontophorus erythrops (E-SA)
- Chestnut wood-quail, Odontophorus hyperythrus (E-CO)
- Dark-backed wood-quail, Odontophorus melanonotus (E-SA)
- Rufous-breasted wood-quail, Odontophorus speciosus (E-SA)
- Tacarcuna wood-quail, Odontophorus dialeucos
- Gorgeted wood-quail, Odontophorus strophium (E-CO)
- Venezuelan wood-quail, Odontophorus columbianus (E-VE)
- Stripe-faced wood-quail, Odontophorus balliviani (E-SA)
- Starred wood-quail, Odontophorus stellatus (E-SA)

== Pheasants ==
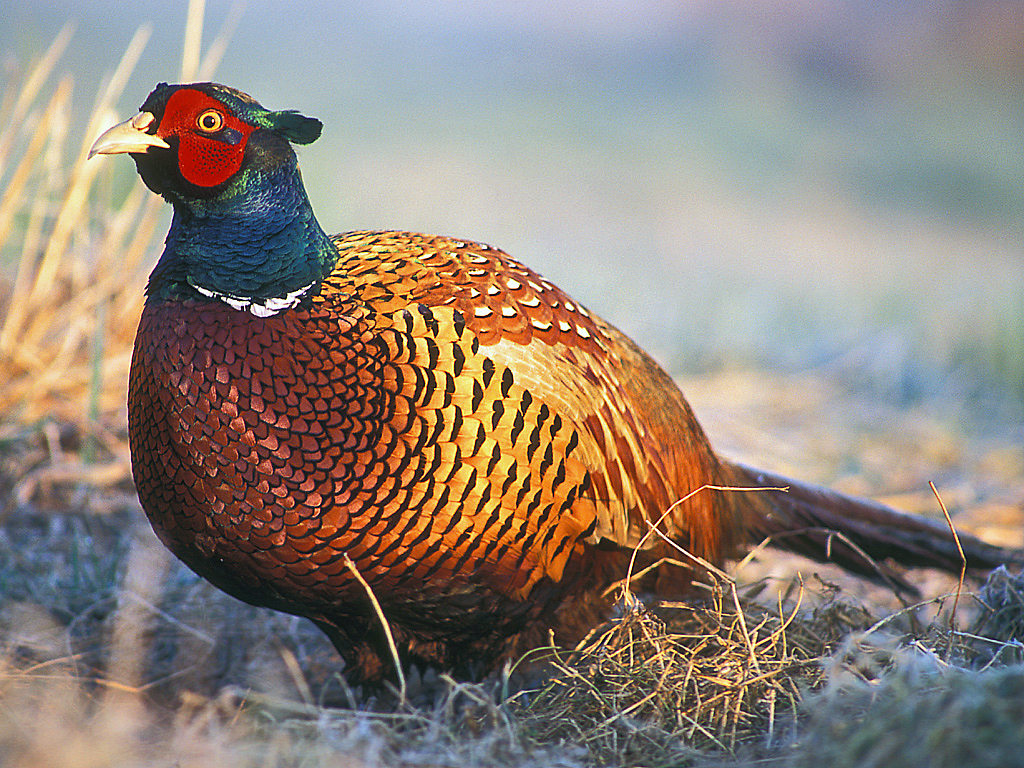
Ring-necked pheasant

Order: Galliformes Family: Phasianidae

Phasianidae consists of the pheasants and their allies. These are terrestrial species, variable in size but generally plump with broad relatively short wings. Many species are gamebirds or have been domesticated as a food source for humans.

- Ring-necked pheasant, Phasianus colchicus (I)
- Silver pheasant, Lophura nycthemera (I)

== Flamingos ==
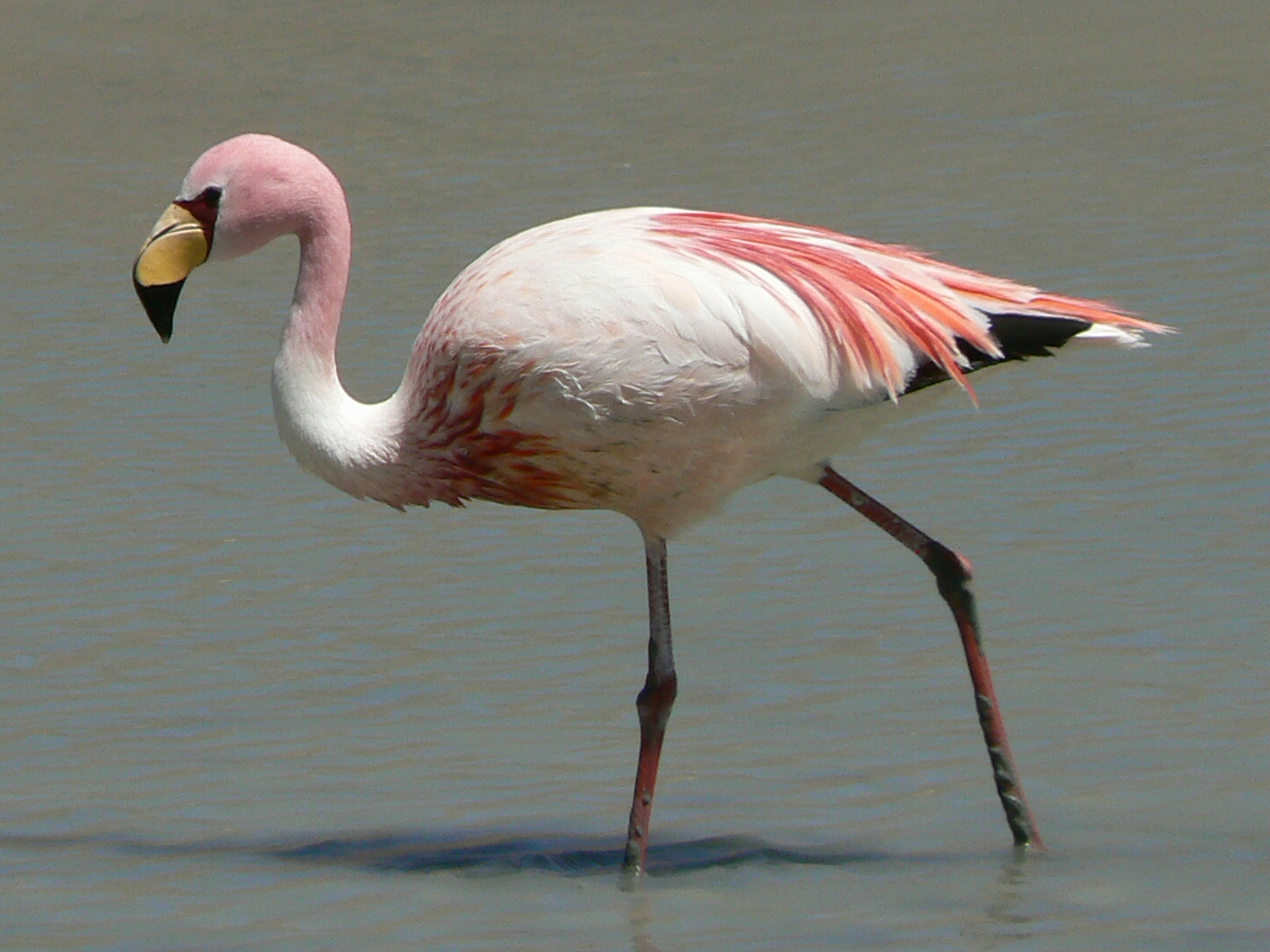
James's flamingo

Order: Phoenicopteriformes Family: Phoenicopteridae

Flamingos are gregarious wading birds, usually 3 to 5 feet (0.9 to 1.5 m) tall, found in both the Western and Eastern Hemispheres. Flamingos filter-feed on shellfish and algae. Their oddly shaped beaks are specially adapted to separate mud and silt from the food they consume and, uniquely, are used upside-down.

- Chilean flamingo, Phoenicopterus chilensis (E-SA)
- American flamingo, Phoenicopterus ruber
- Greater flamingo, Phoenicopterus roseus (UC) (V, not on the SACC list)
- Andean flamingo, Phoenicoparrus andinus (E-SA)
- James's flamingo, Phoenicoparrus jamesi (E-SA)

== Grebes ==
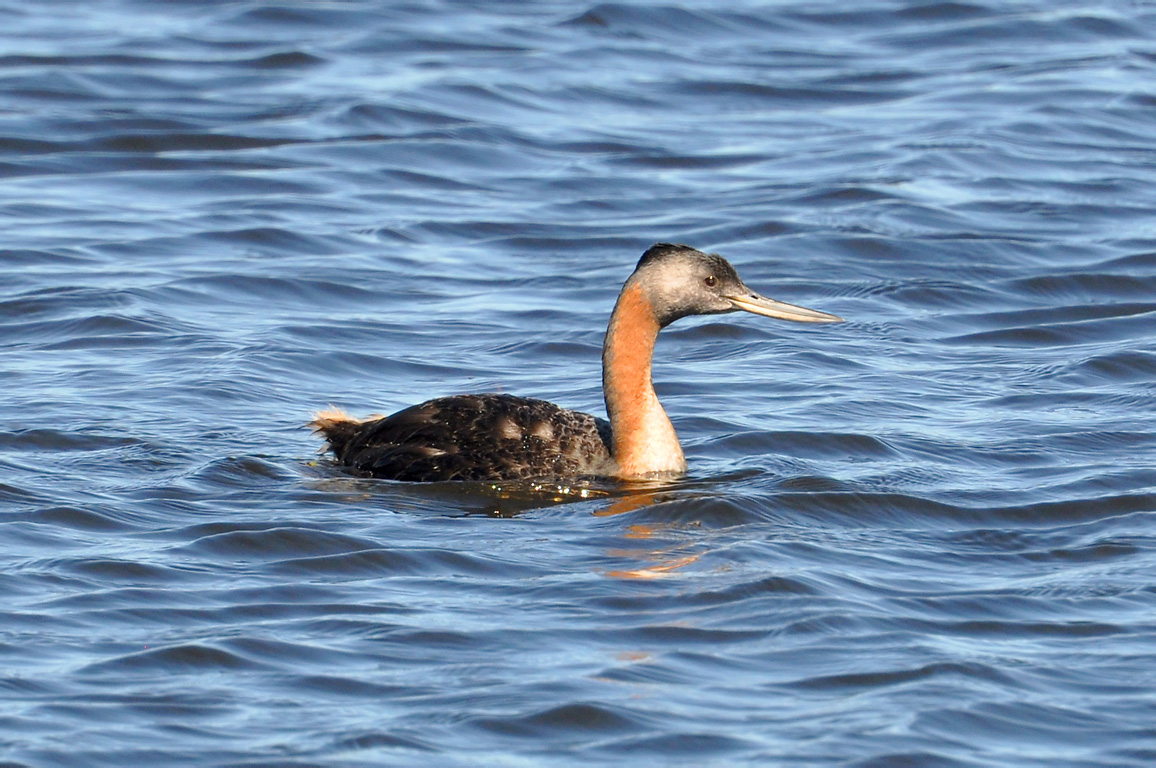
Great grebe

Order: Podicipediformes Family: Podicipedidae

Grebes are small to medium-large freshwater diving birds. They have lobed toes and are excellent swimmers and divers. However, they have their feet placed far back on the body, making them quite ungainly on land.

- White-tufted grebe, Rollandia rolland (E-SA)
- Titicaca grebe, Rollandia microptera (E-SA)
- Least grebe, Tachybaptus dominicus
- Pied-billed grebe, Podilymbus podiceps (All)
- Great grebe, Podiceps major (E-SA)
- Colombian grebe, Podiceps andinus (E-CO) (extinct)
- Silvery grebe, Podiceps occipitalis (E-SA)
- Junin grebe, Podiceps taczanowskii (E-PE)
- Hooded grebe, Podiceps gallardoi (E-AR)

== Pigeons ==
Order: Columbiformes Family: Columbidae

Pigeons and doves are stout-bodied birds with short necks and short slender bills with a fleshy cere.

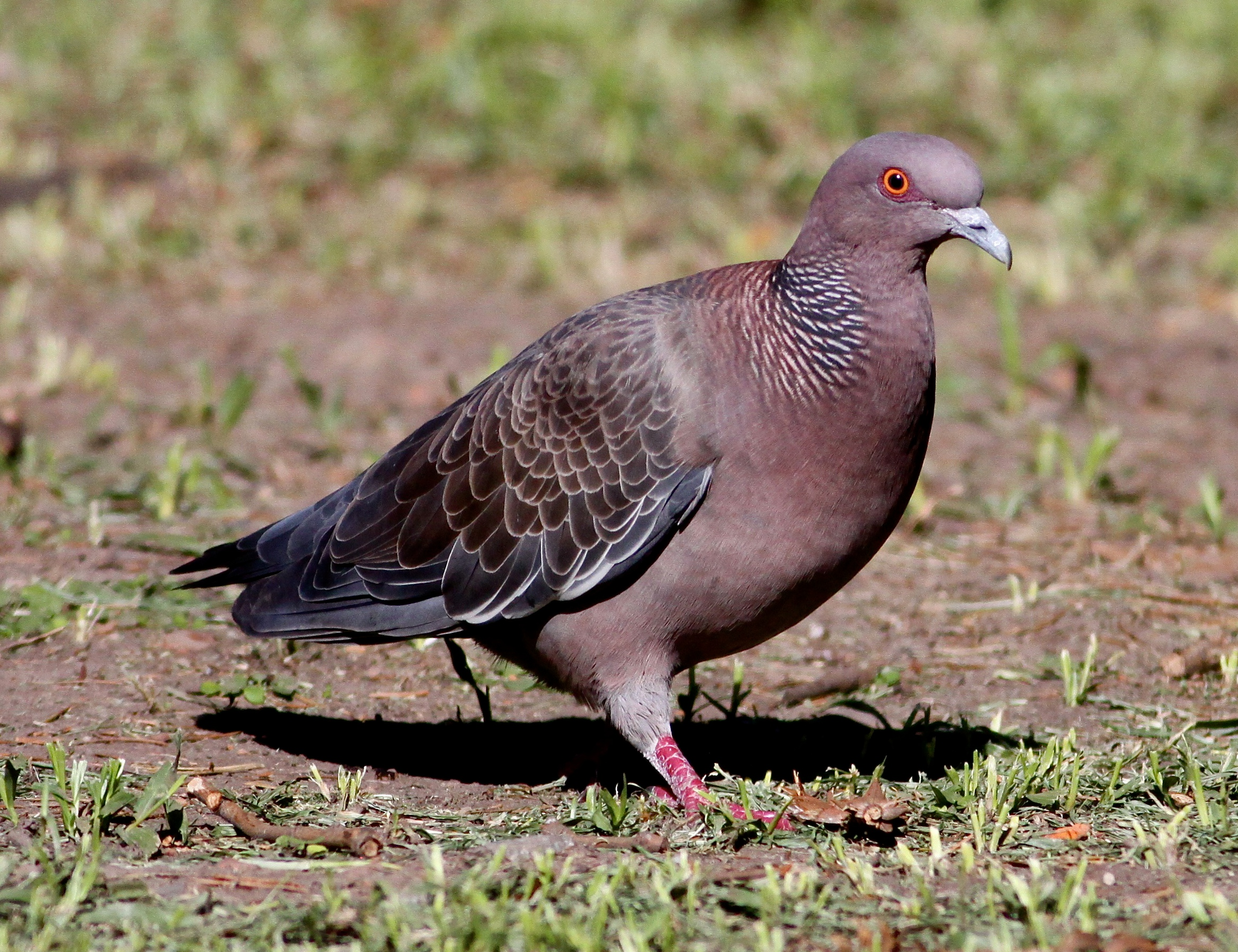
Picazuro pigeon

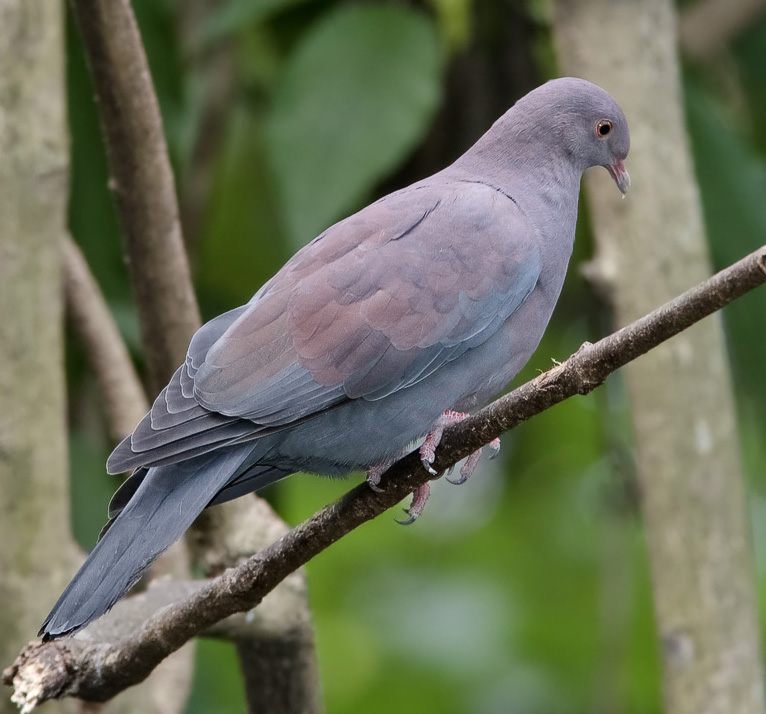
Peruvian pigeon

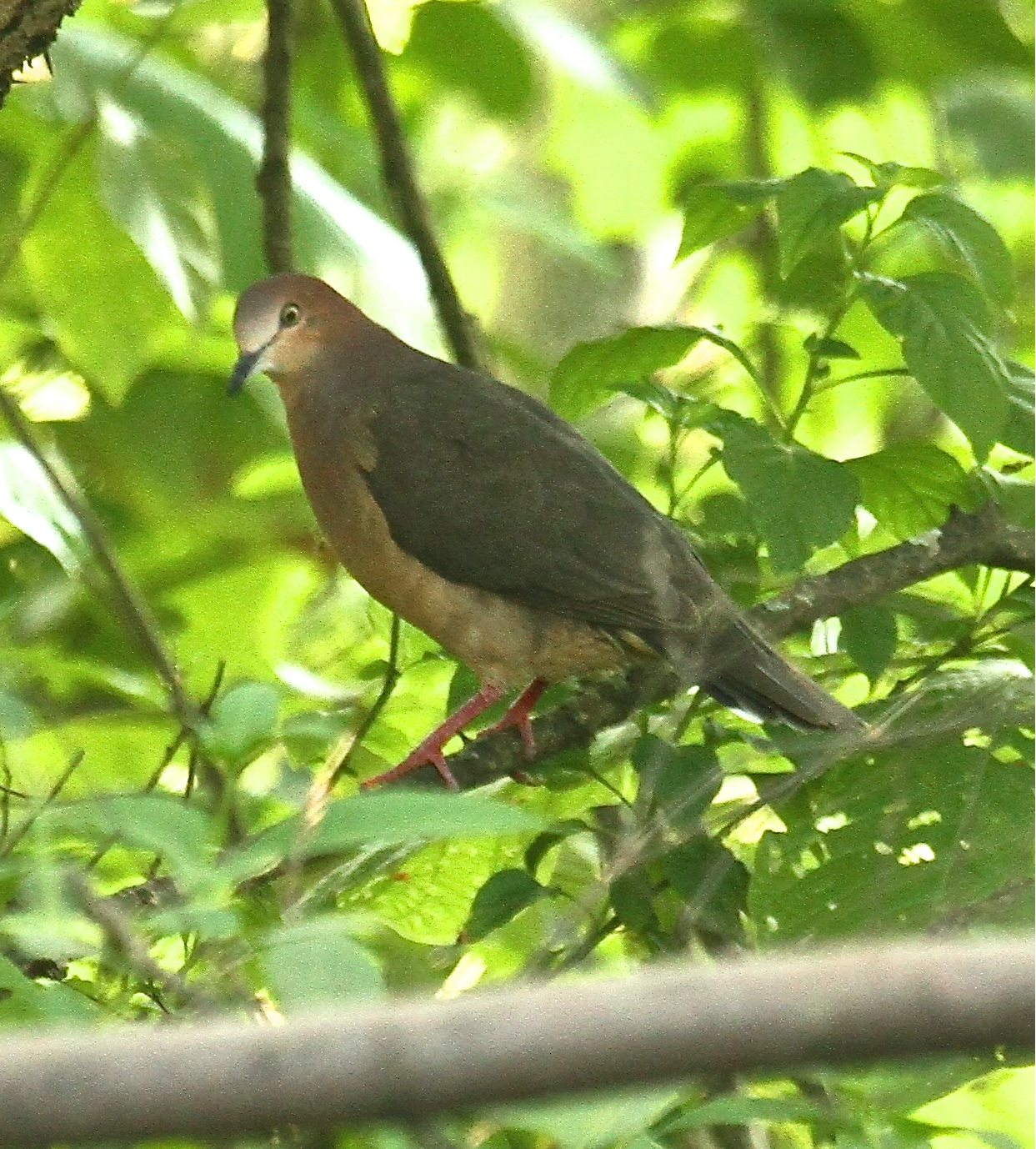
Ochre-bellied dove

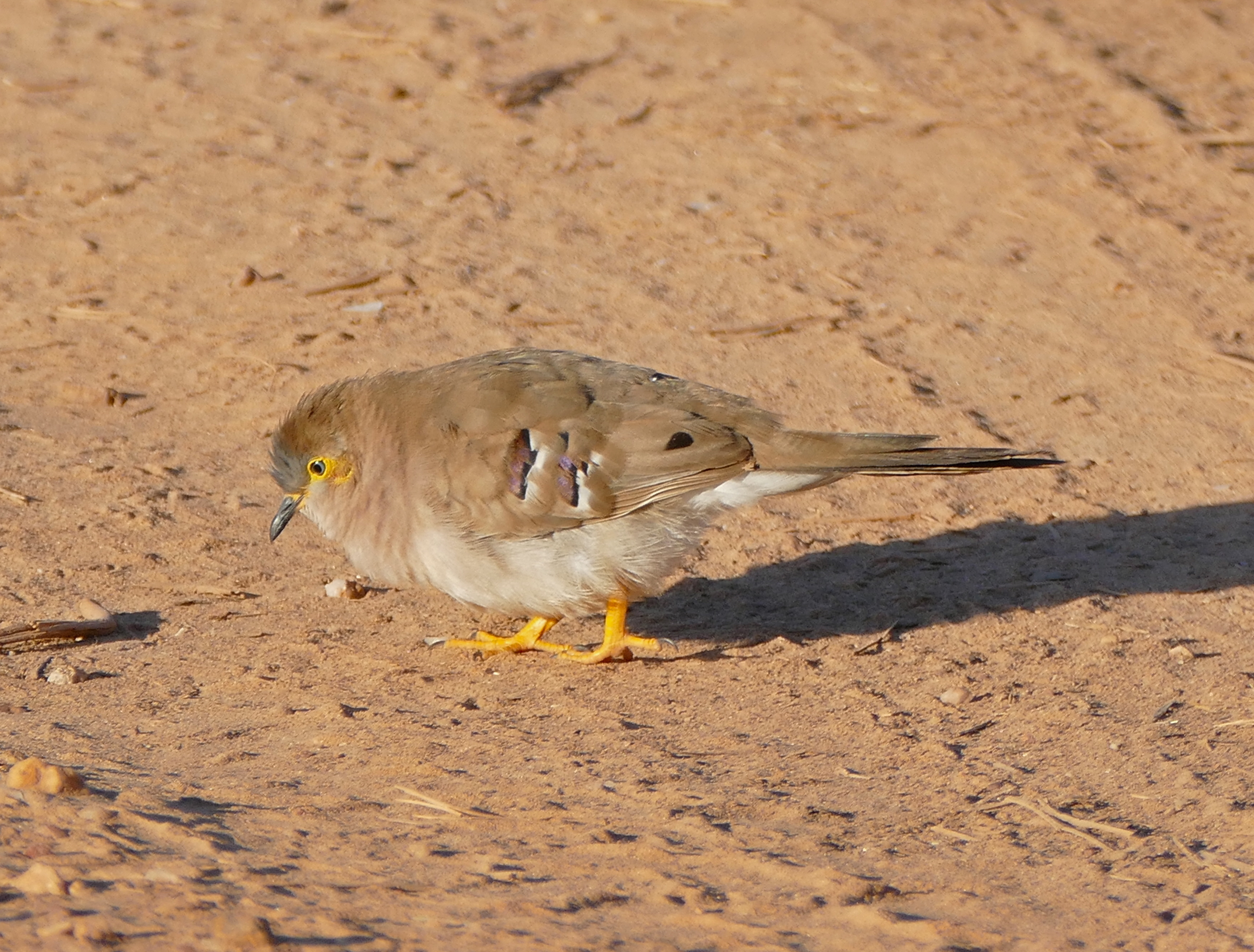
Long-tailed ground dove

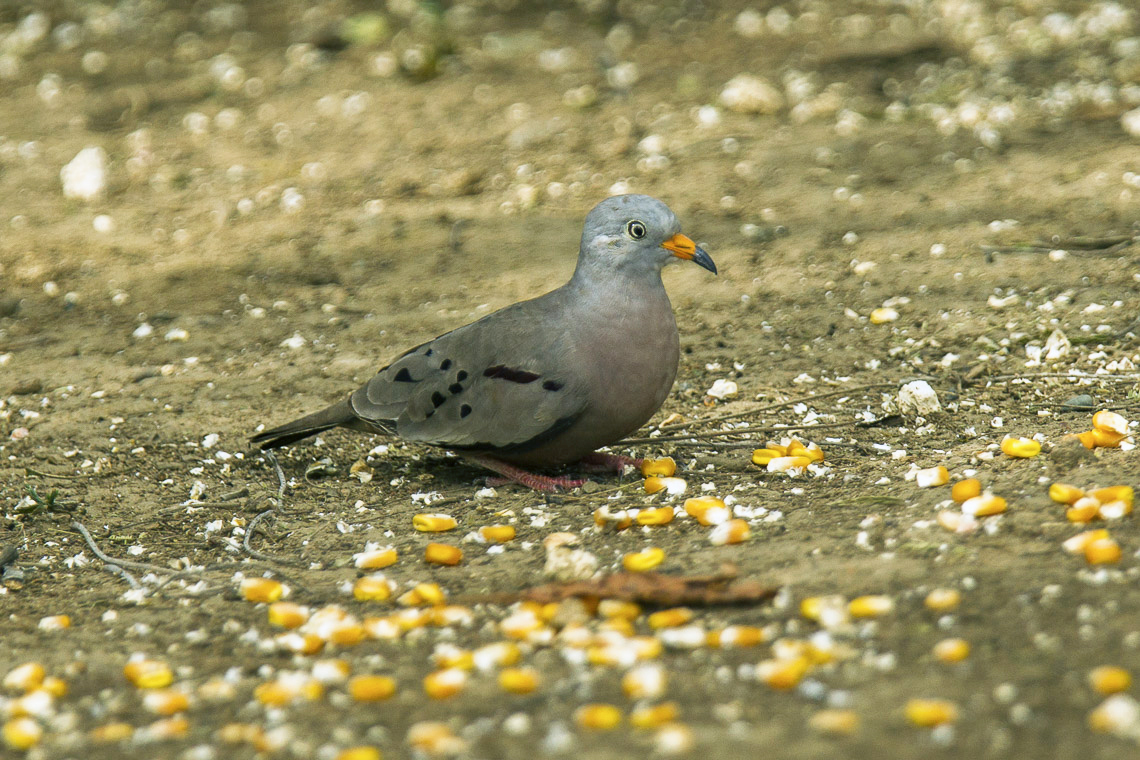
Croaking ground dove
- Rock pigeon, Columba livia (I)
- White-crowned pigeon, Patagioenas leucocephala
- Scaled pigeon, Patagioenas speciosa
- Scaly-naped pigeon, Patagioenas squamosa
- Picazuro pigeon, Patagioenas picazuro (E-SA)
- Bare-eyed pigeon, Patagioenas corensis (E-SA)
- Spot-winged pigeon, Patagioenas maculosa (E-SA)
- Band-tailed pigeon, Patagioenas fasciata
- Chilean pigeon, Patagioenas araucana (E-SA)
- Pale-vented pigeon, Patagioenas cayennensis
- Peruvian pigeon, Patagioenas oenops (E-PE)
- Plumbeous pigeon, Patagioenas plumbea
- Ruddy pigeon, Patagioenas subvinacea
- Short-billed pigeon, Patagioenas nigrirostris
- Dusky pigeon, Patagioenas goodsoni
- Eurasian collared dove, Streptopelia decaocto (I)
- Purple quail-dove, Geotrygon purpurata (E-SA)
- Sapphire quail-dove, Geotrygon saphirina (E-SA)
- Ruddy quail-dove, Geotrygon montana
- Violaceous quail-dove, Geotrygon violacea
- Olive-backed quail-dove, Leptotrygon veraguensis
- White-tipped dove, Leptotila verreauxi
- Gray-chested dove, Leptotila cassinii
- Tolima dove, Leptotila conoveri (E-CO)
- Ochre-bellied dove, Leptotila ochraceiventris (E-SA)
- Gray-headed dove, Leptotila plumbeiceps
- Gray-fronted dove, Leptotila rufaxilla (E-SA)
- Pallid dove, Leptotila pallida (E-SA)
- Large-tailed dove, Leptotila megalura (E-SA)
- White-throated quail-dove, Zentrygon frenata (E-SA)
- Lined quail-dove, Zentrygon linearis (E-SA)
- Russet-crowned quail-dove, Zentrygon goldmani
- White-winged dove, Zenaida asiatica (V)
- West Peruvian dove, Zenaida meloda (E-SA)
- Galapagos dove, Zenaida galapagoensis (E-GA)
- Eared dove, Zenaida auriculata (All)
- Mourning dove, Zenaida macroura (V)
- Blue ground dove, Claravis pretiosa
- Long-tailed ground dove, Uropelia campestris (E-SA)
- Maroon-chested ground dove, Paraclaravis mondetoura
- Purple-winged ground dove, Paraclaravis geoffroyi (E-SA)
- Bare-faced ground dove, Metriopelia ceciliae (E-SA)
- Bare-eyed ground dove, Metriopelia morenoi (E-AR)
- Black-winged ground dove, Metriopelia melanoptera (E-SA)
- Golden-spotted ground dove, Metriopelia aymara (E-SA)
- Common ground dove, Columbina passerina
- Plain-breasted ground dove, Columbina minuta
- Ruddy ground dove, Columbina talpacoti
- Ecuadorian ground dove, Columbina buckleyi (E-SA)
- Scaled dove, Columbina squammata (E-SA)
- Picui ground dove, Columbina picui (E-SA)
- Croaking ground dove, Columbina cruziana (E-SA)
- Blue-eyed ground dove, Columbina cyanopis (E-BR)

== Cuckoos ==
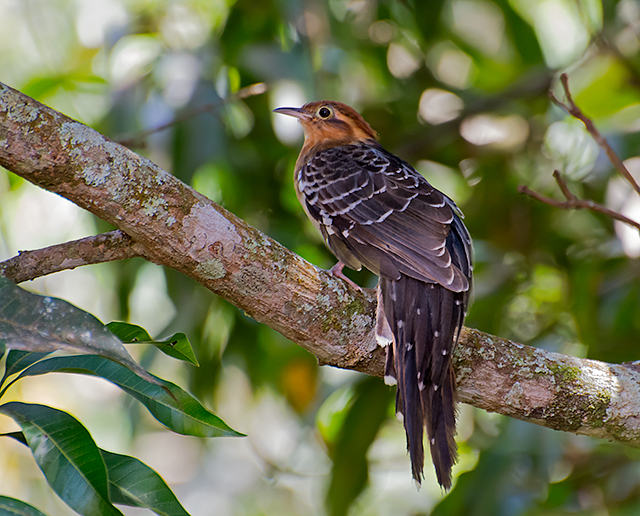
Pavonine cuckoo

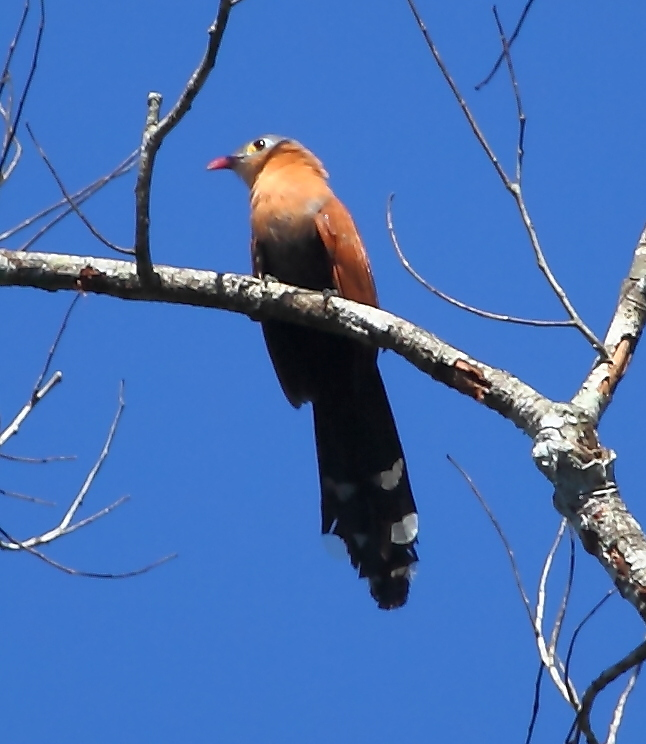
Black-bellied cuckoo

Order: Cuculiformes Family: Cuculidae

The family Cuculidae includes cuckoos, roadrunners, and anis. These birds are of variable size with slender bodies, long tails and strong legs.

- Guira cuckoo, Guira guira (E-SA)
- Greater ani, Crotophaga major
- Smooth-billed ani, Crotophaga ani
- Groove-billed ani, Crotophaga sulcirostris
- Striped cuckoo, Tapera naevia
- Pheasant cuckoo, Dromococcyx phasianellus
- Pavonine cuckoo, Dromococcyx pavoninus (E-SA)
- Rufous-vented ground-cuckoo, Neomorphus geoffroyi
- Scaled ground-cuckoo, Neomorphus squamiger (E-BR)
- Banded ground-cuckoo, Neomorphus radiolosus (E-SA)
- Rufous-winged ground-cuckoo, Neomorphus rufipennis (E-SA)
- Red-billed ground-cuckoo, Neomorphus pucheranii (E-SA)
- Little cuckoo, Coccycua minuta
- Dwarf cuckoo, Coccycua pumila (E-SA)
- Ash-colored cuckoo, Coccycua cinerea (E-SA)
- Squirrel cuckoo, Piaya cayana
- Black-bellied cuckoo, Piaya melanogaster (E-SA)
- Dark-billed cuckoo, Coccyzus melacoryphus (E-SA)
- Yellow-billed cuckoo, Coccyzus americanus (All)
- Pearly-breasted cuckoo, Coccyzus euleri (E-SA)
- Mangrove cuckoo, Coccyzus minor
- Black-billed cuckoo, Coccyzus erythropthalmus
- Gray-capped cuckoo, Coccyzus lansbergi (E-SA)
- Common cuckoo, Cuculus canorus (V)

== Oilbird ==
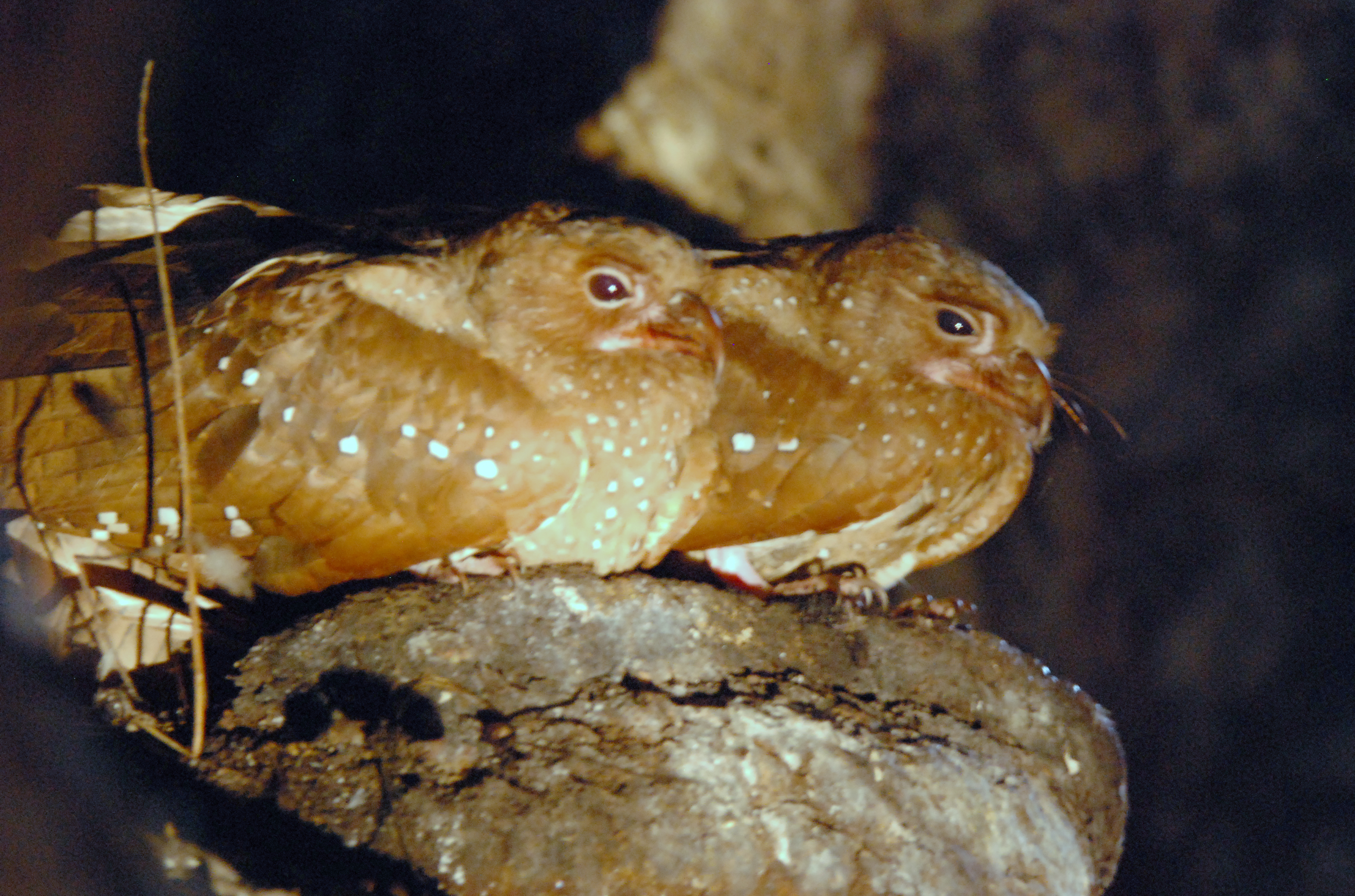
Oilbirds

Order: Steatornithiformes Family: Steatornithidae

The oilbird is a slim, long-winged bird related to the nightjars. It is nocturnal and a specialist feeder on the fruit of the oil palm.

- Oilbird, Steatornis caripensis

== Potoos ==
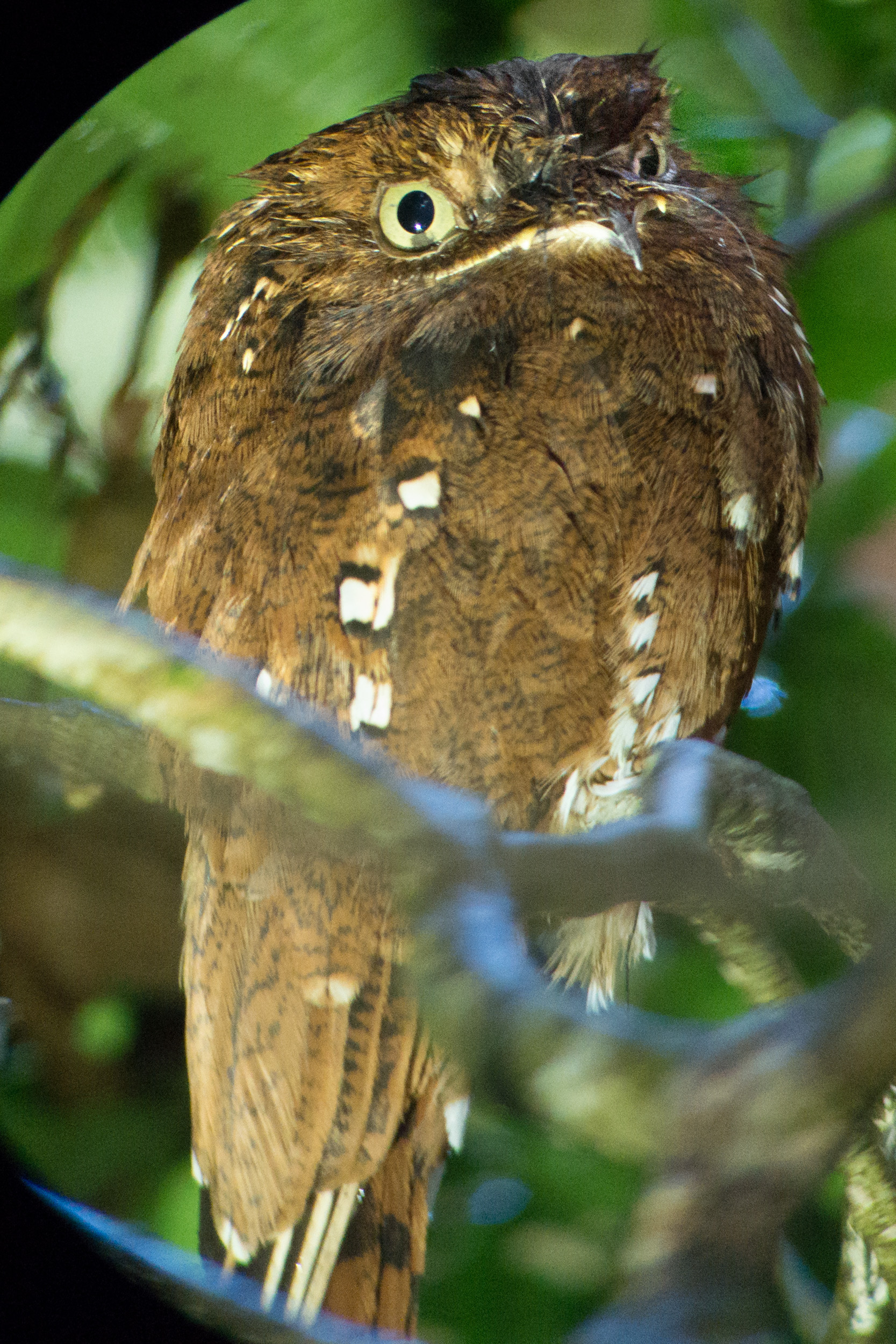
Rufous potoo

Order: Nyctibiiformes Family: Nyctibiidae

Potoos (sometimes called poor-me-ones) are large near passerine birds related to the nightjars and frogmouths. They are nocturnal insectivores which lack the bristles around the mouth found in the true nightjars.

- Rufous potoo, Phyllaemulor bracteatus (E-SA)
- Great potoo, Nyctibius grandis
- Long-tailed potoo, Nyctibius aethereus (E-SA)
- Common potoo, Nyctibius griseus
- Andean potoo, Nyctibius maculosus (E-SA)
- White-winged potoo, Nyctibius leucopterus (E-SA)

== Nightjars ==
Order: Caprimulgiformes Family: Caprimulgidae

Nightjars are medium-sized nocturnal birds that usually nest on the ground. They have long wings, short legs, and very short bills. Most have small feet, of little use for walking, and long pointed wings. Their soft plumage is camouflaged to resemble bark or leaves.

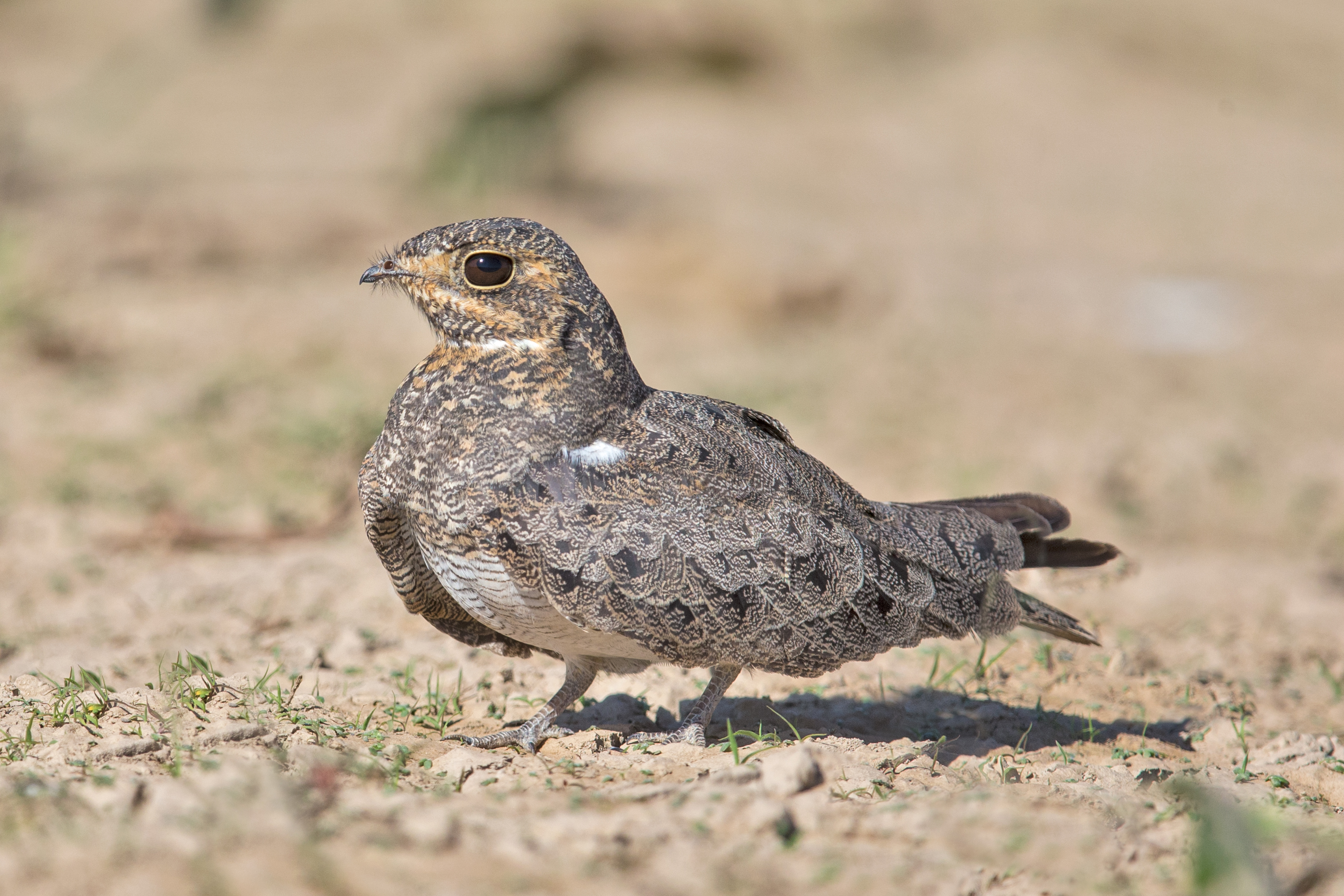
Nacunda nighthawk

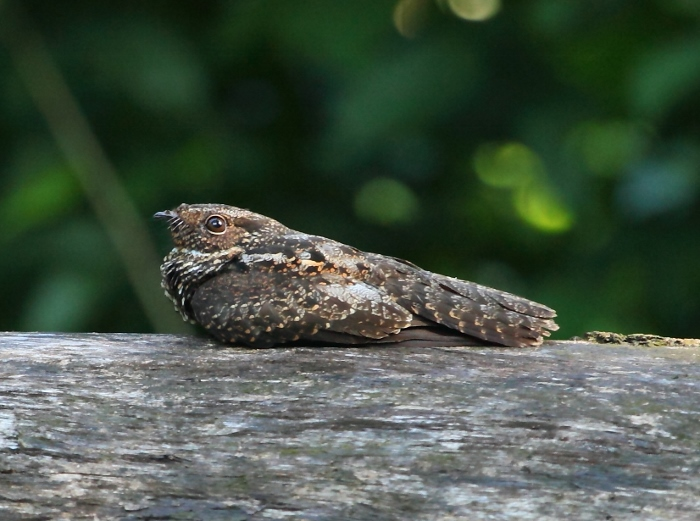
Blackish nightjar

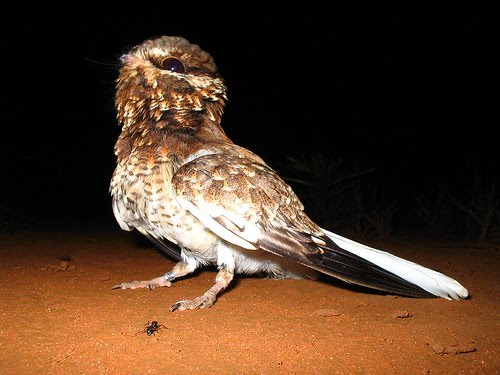
White-winged nightjar

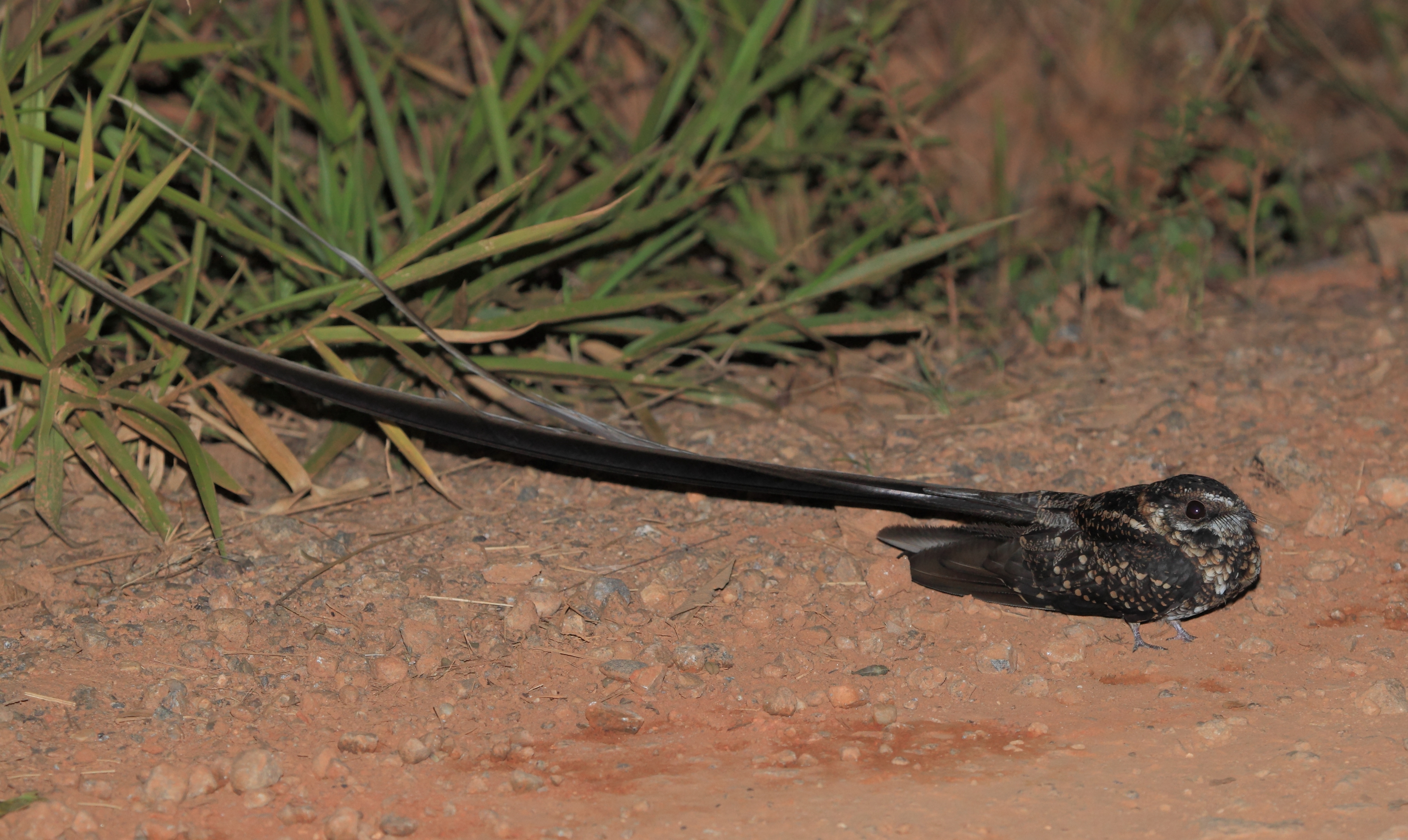
Long-trained nightjar

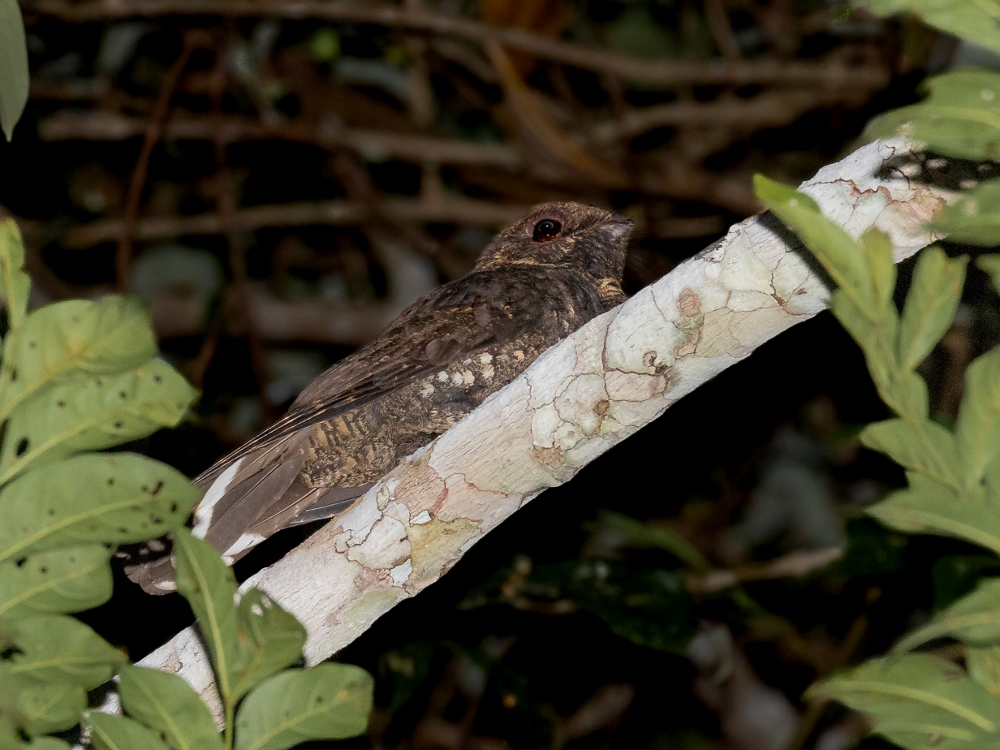
Silky-tailed nightjar
- Nacunda nighthawk, Chordeiles nacunda (E-SA)
- Least nighthawk, Chordeiles pusillus (E-SA)
- Sand-colored nighthawk, Chordeiles rupestris (E-SA)
- Lesser nighthawk, Chordeiles acutipennis
- Common nighthawk, Chordeiles minor
- Antillean nighthawk, Chordeiles gundlachii (V)
- Band-tailed nighthawk, Nyctiprogne leucopyga (E-SA) (see note) (Note: The SACC has split Nyctiprogne atifascia from Nyctiprogne leucopyga (Proposal 673) but has not assigned English names, so the proposal has not been implemented and the counts do not reflect the change.)
- Bahian nighthawk, Nyctiprogne vielliardi (E-BR)
- Short-tailed nighthawk, Lurocalis semitorquatus
- Rufous-bellied nighthawk, Lurocalis rufiventris (E-SA)
- Blackish nightjar, Nyctipolus nigrescens (E-SA)
- Pygmy nightjar, Nyctipolus hirundinaceus (E-BR)
- Common pauraque, Nyctidromus albicollis
- Scrub nightjar, Nyctidromus anthonyi (E-SA)
- Roraiman nightjar, Tepuiornis whitelyi (E-SA)
- Swallow-tailed nightjar, Uropsalis segmentata (E-SA)
- Lyre-tailed nightjar, Uropsalis lyra (E-SA)
- Tschudi's nightjar, Quechuavis decussata (E-SA)
- Todd's nightjar, Setopagis heterura (E-SA)
- Little nightjar, Setopagis parvula (E-SA)
- Cayenne nightjar, Setopagis maculosa (E-FG)
- Spot-tailed nightjar, Hydropsalis maculicaudus
- Long-trained nightjar, Hydropsalis forcipata (E-SA)
- White-tailed nightjar, Hydropsalis cayennensis
- Ladder-tailed nightjar, Hydropsalis climacocerca (E-SA)
- Scissor-tailed nightjar, Hydropsalis torquata (E-SA)
- Band-winged nightjar, Systellura longirostris (E-SA)
- White-winged nightjar, Eleothreptus candicans (E-SA)
- Sickle-winged nightjar, Eleothreptus anomalus (E-SA)
- Choco poorwill, Nyctiphrynus rosenbergi (E-SA)
- Ocellated poorwill, Nyctiphrynus ocellatus
- Silky-tailed nightjar, Antrostomus sericocaudatus (E-SA)
- Chuck-will's-widow, Antrostomus carolinensis
- Rufous nightjar, Antrostomus rufus

== Swifts ==
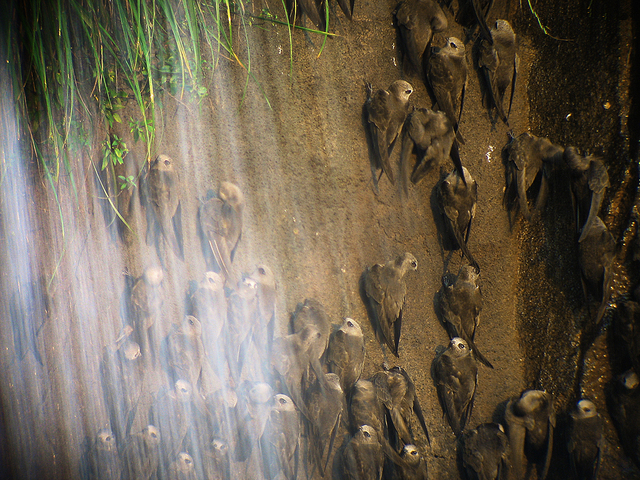
Great dusky swifts

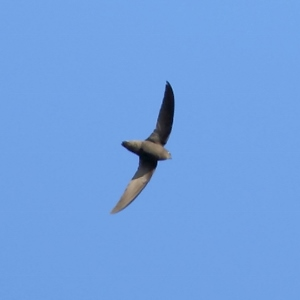
Sick's swift

Order: Apodiformes Family: Apodidae

Swifts are small birds which spend the majority of their lives flying. These birds have very short legs and never settle voluntarily on the ground, perching instead only on vertical surfaces. Many swifts have long swept-back wings which resemble a crescent or boomerang.

- Spot-fronted swift, Cypseloides cherriei
- White-chinned swift, Cypseloides cryptus
- Black swift, Cypseloides niger
- White-chested swift, Cypseloides lemosi (E-SA)
- Rothschild's swift, Cypseloides rothschildi (E-SA)
- Sooty swift, Cypseloides fumigatus (E-SA)
- Great dusky swift, Cypseloides senex (E-SA)
- Chestnut-collared swift, Streptoprocne rutila
- Tepui swift, Streptoprocne phelpsi (E-SA)
- White-collared swift, Streptoprocne zonaris
- Biscutate swift, Streptoprocne biscutata (E-SA)
- Gray-rumped swift, Chaetura cinereiventris
- Band-rumped swift, Chaetura spinicaudus
- Pale-rumped swift, Chaetura egregia (E-SA)
- Chimney swift, Chaetura pelagica
- Vaux's swift, Chaetura vauxi
- Chapman's swift, Chaetura chapmani
- Ashy-tailed swift, Chaetura andrei (E-SA)
- Sick's swift, Chaetura meridionalis (E-SA)
- Short-tailed swift, Chaetura brachyura
- White-tipped swift, Aeronautes montivagus (E-SA)
- Andean swift, Aeronautes andecolus (E-SA)
- Pygmy palm swift, Tachornis furcata (E-SA)
- Fork-tailed palm-swift, Tachornis squamata (E-SA)
- Lesser swallow-tailed swift, Panyptila cayennensis
- Common swift, Apus apus (V)
- Alpine swift, Tachymarptis melba (UC) (V, not on the SACC list)

== Hummingbirds ==
Order: Apodiformes Family: Trochilidae

Hummingbirds are small birds capable of hovering in mid-air due to the rapid flapping of their wings. They are the only birds that can fly backwards.

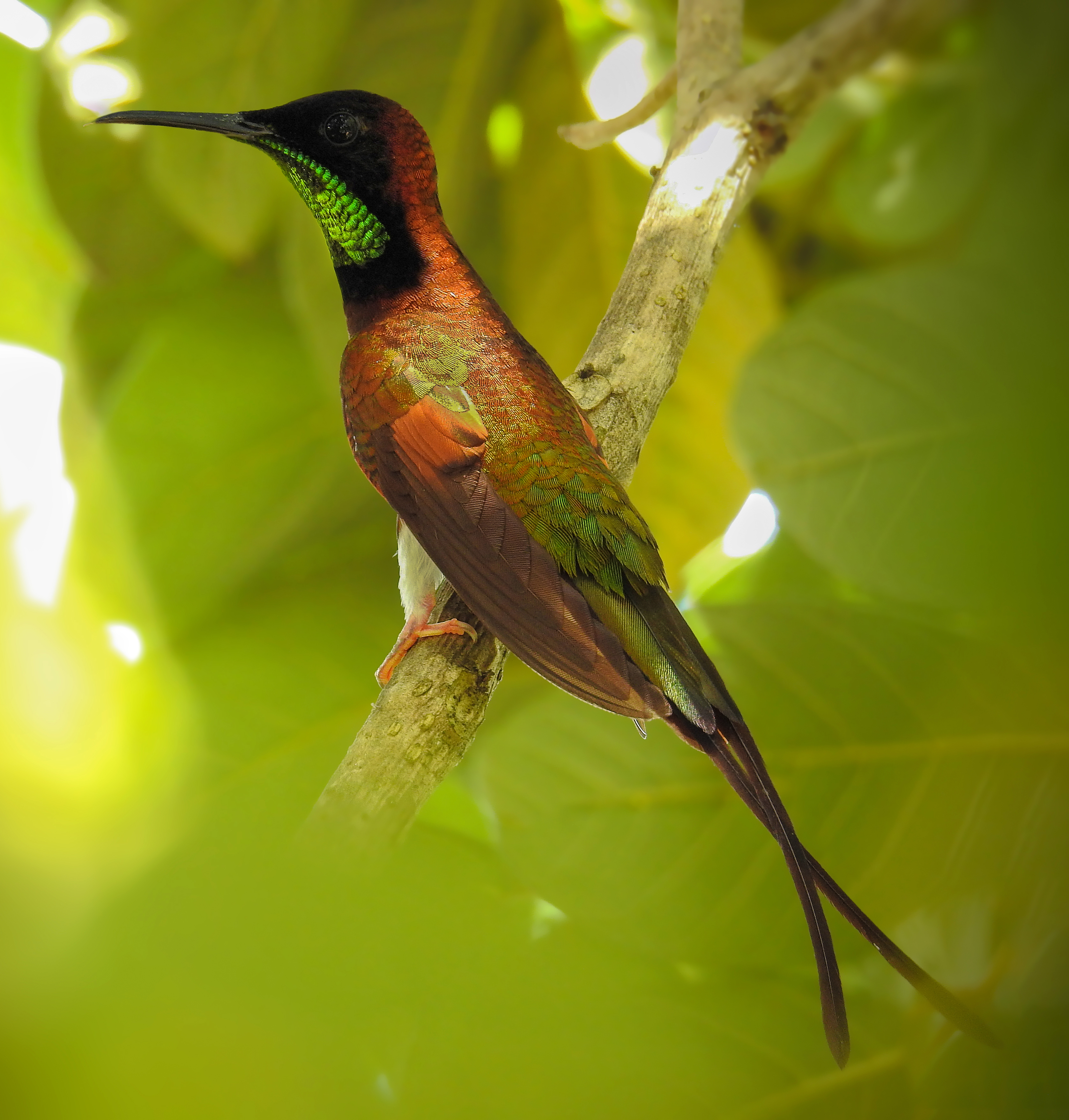
Crimson topaz

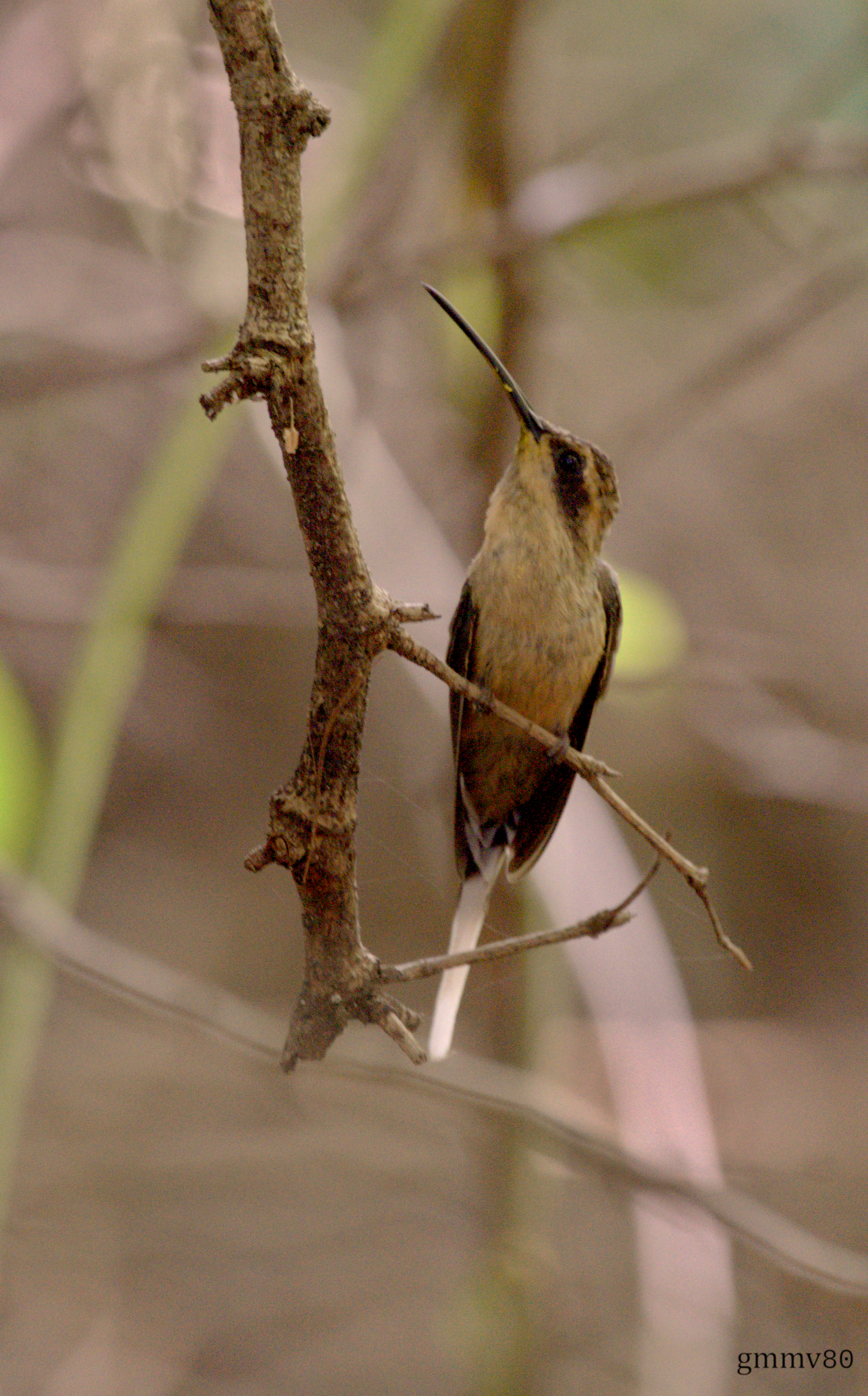
Buff-bellied hermit

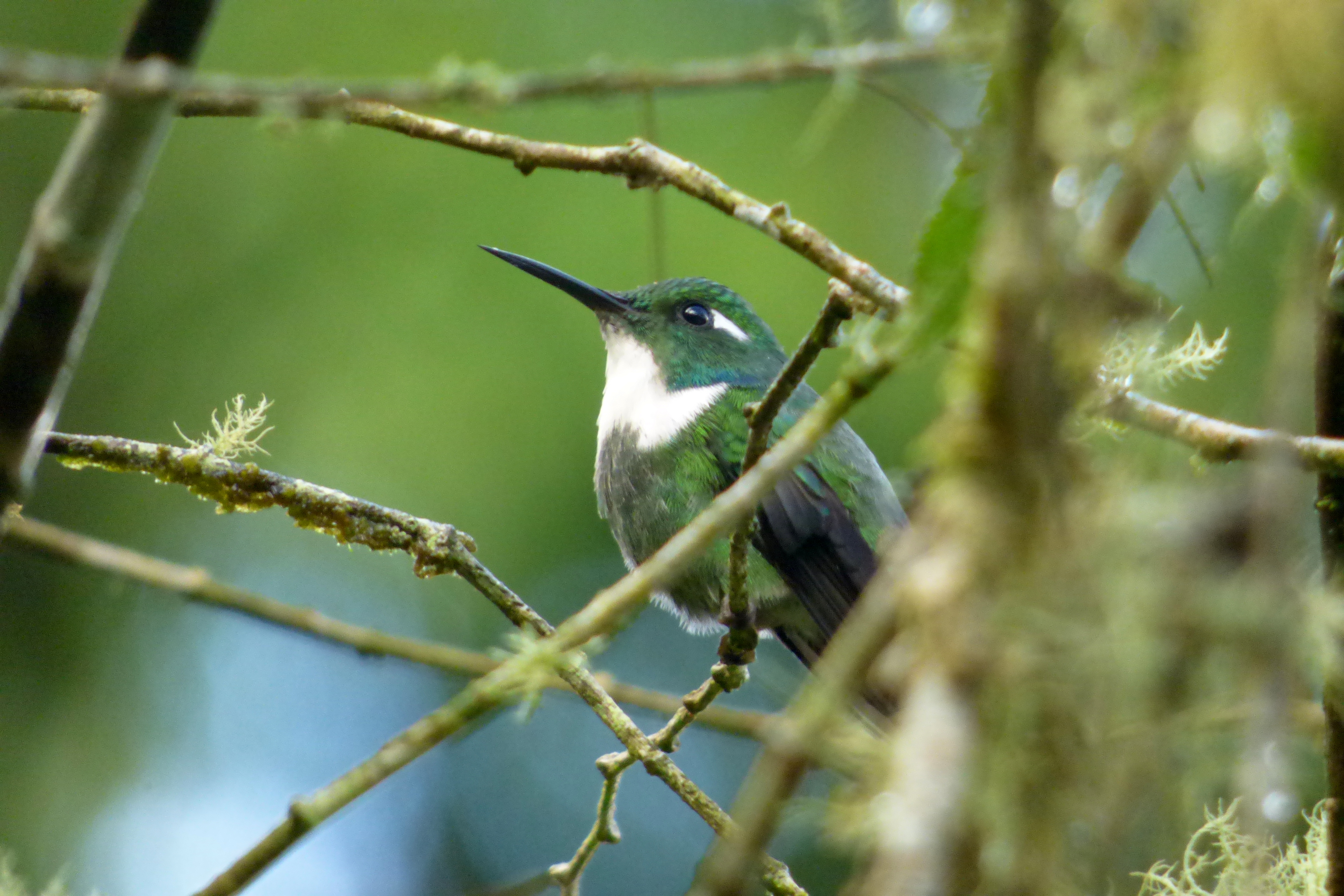
Geoffroy's daggerbill

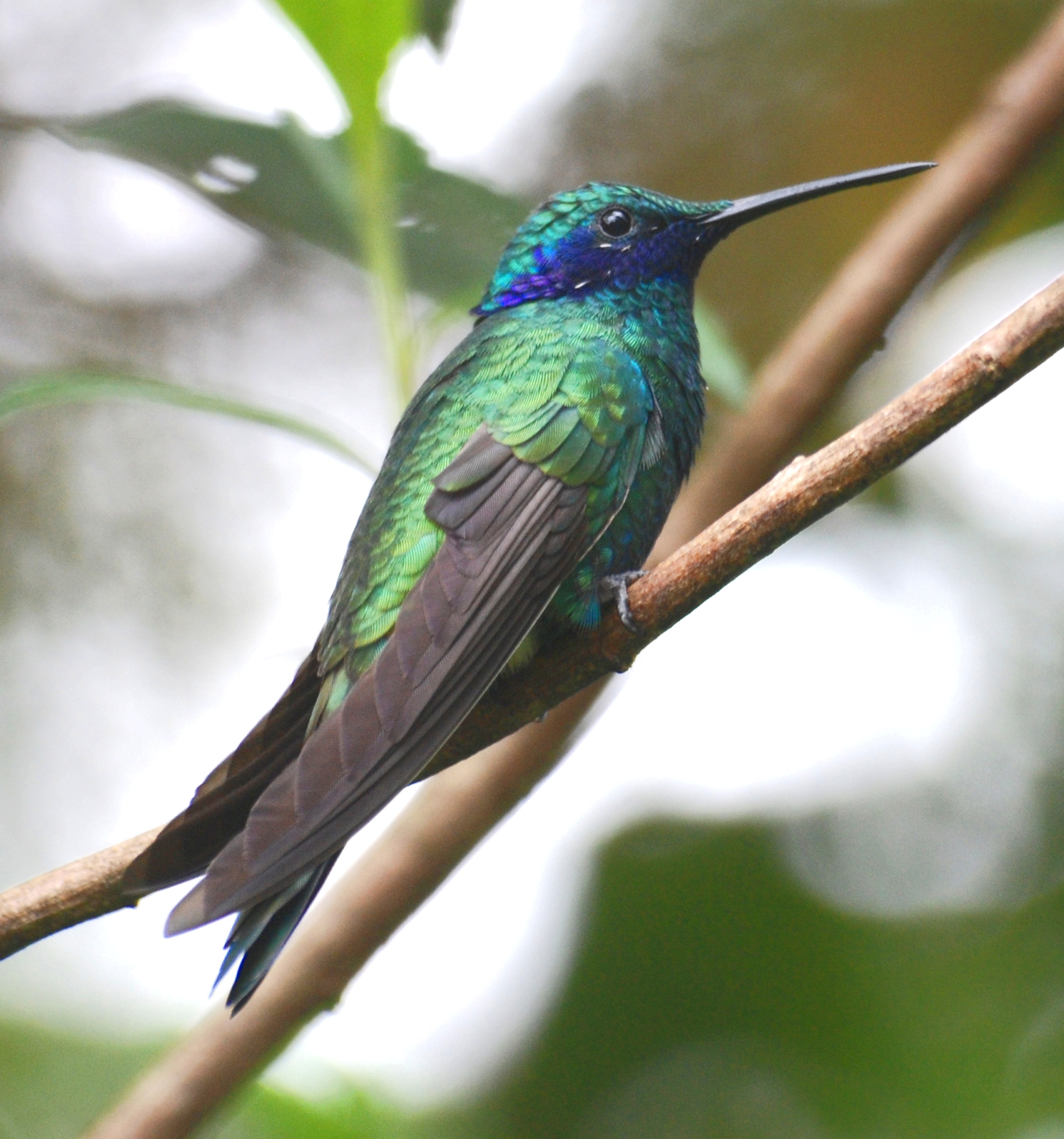
Sparkling violetear

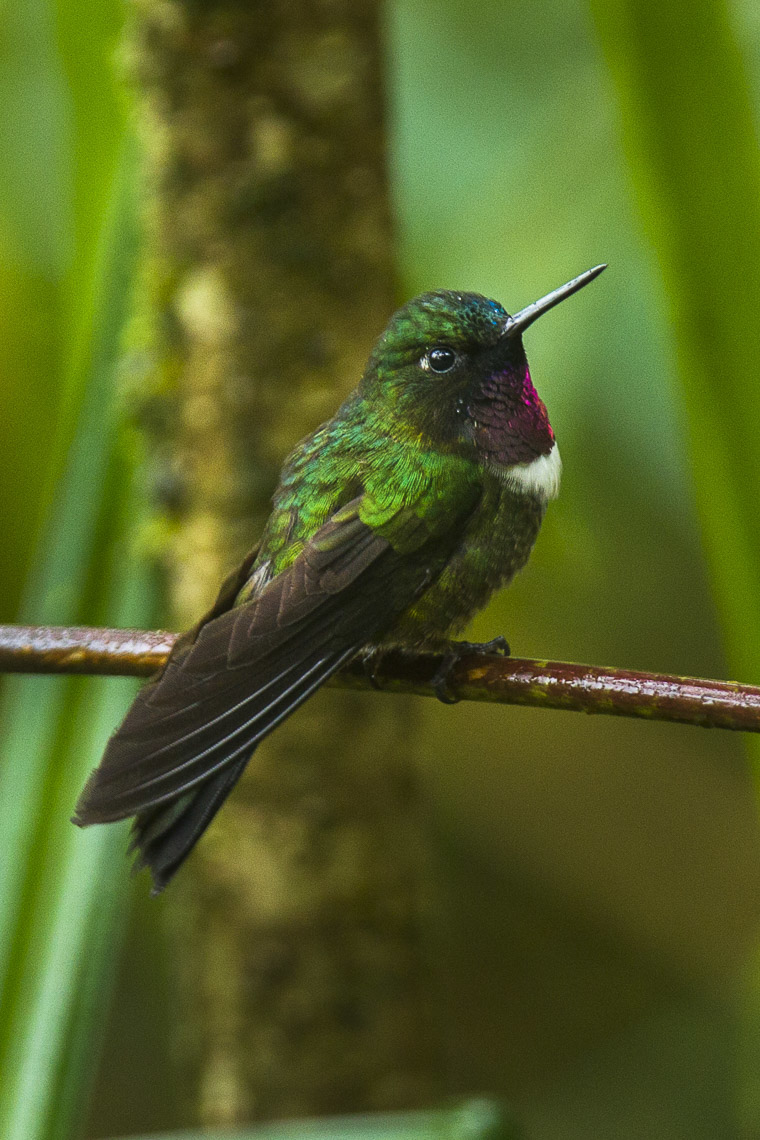
Amethyst-throated sunangel

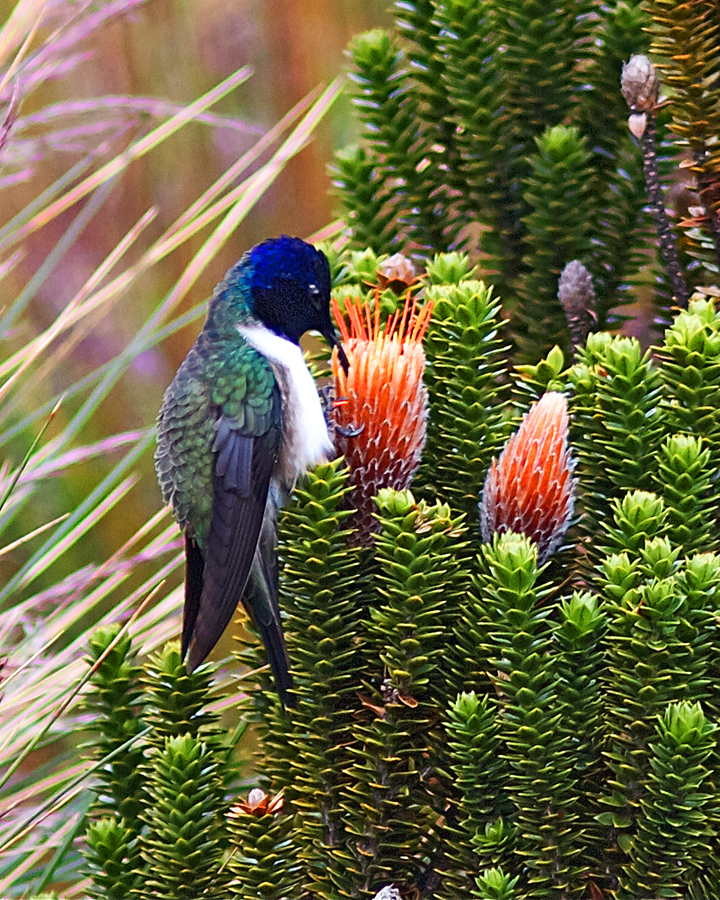
Ecuadorian hillstar

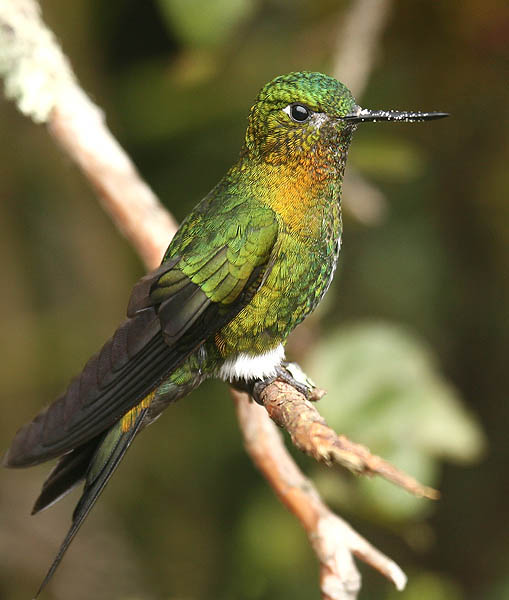
Golden-breasted puffleg

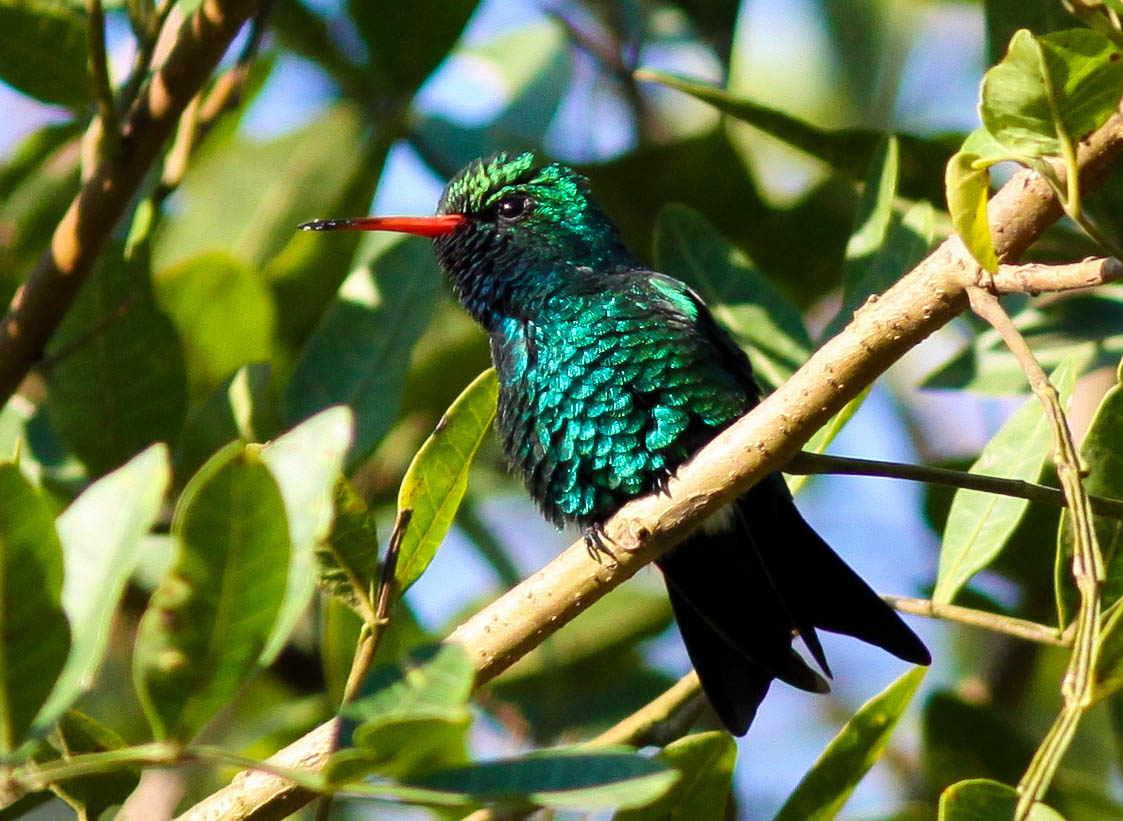
Glittering-bellied emerald

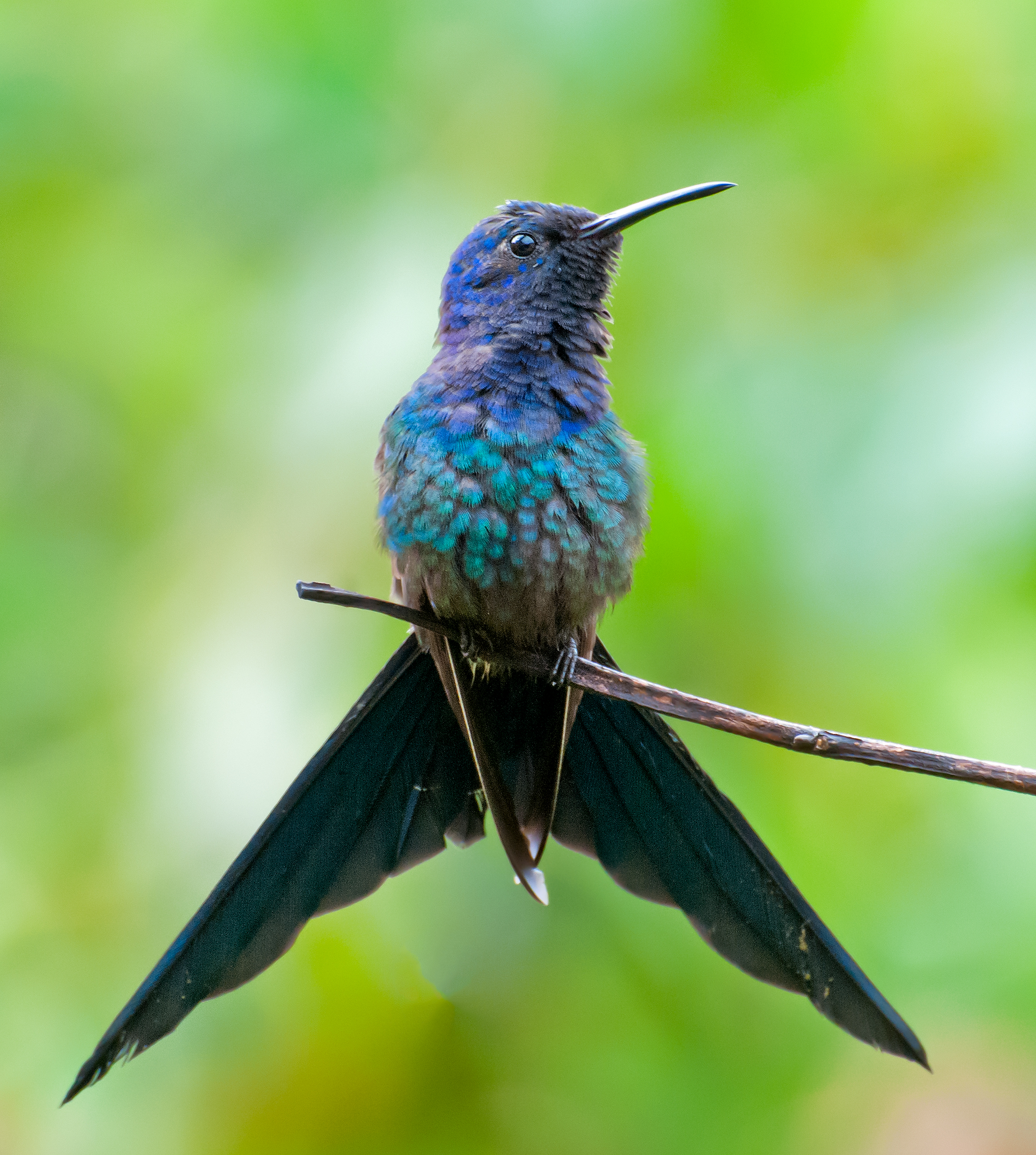
Swallow-tailed hummingbird

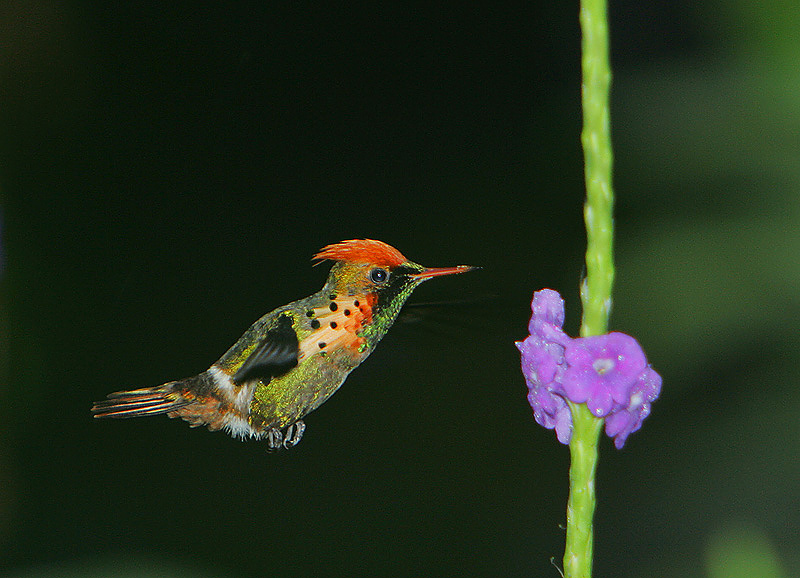
Tufted coquette

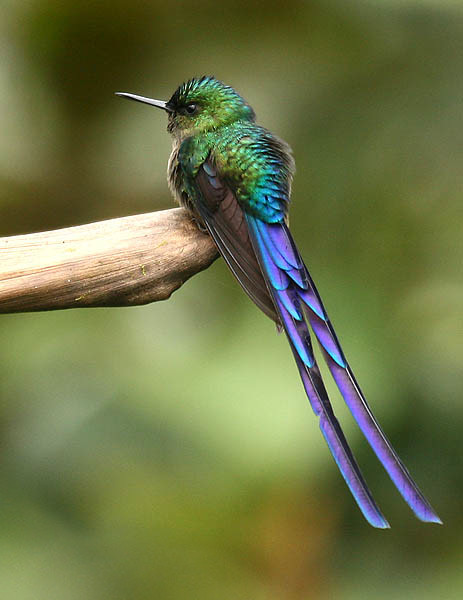
Violet-tailed sylph

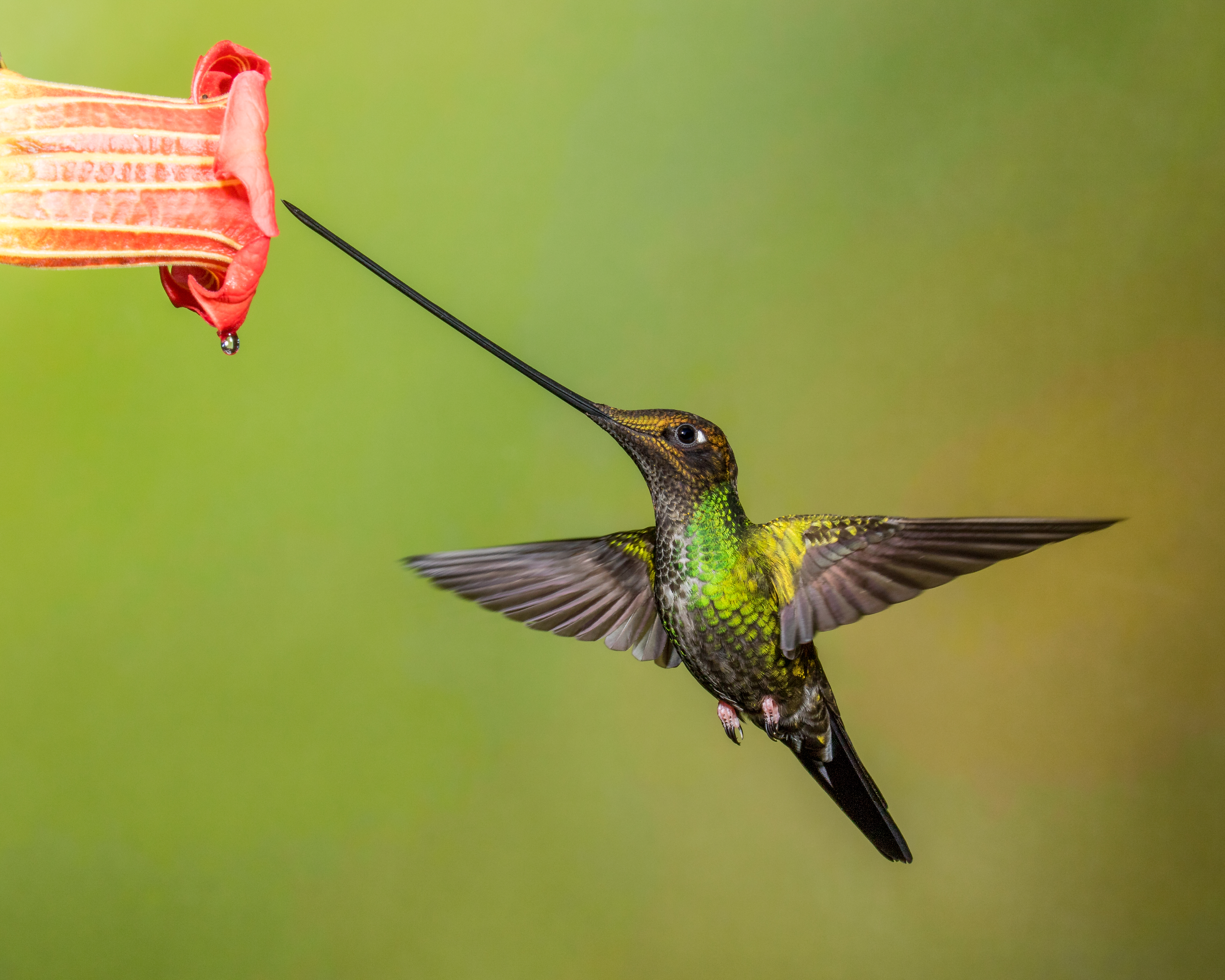
Sword-billed hummingbird

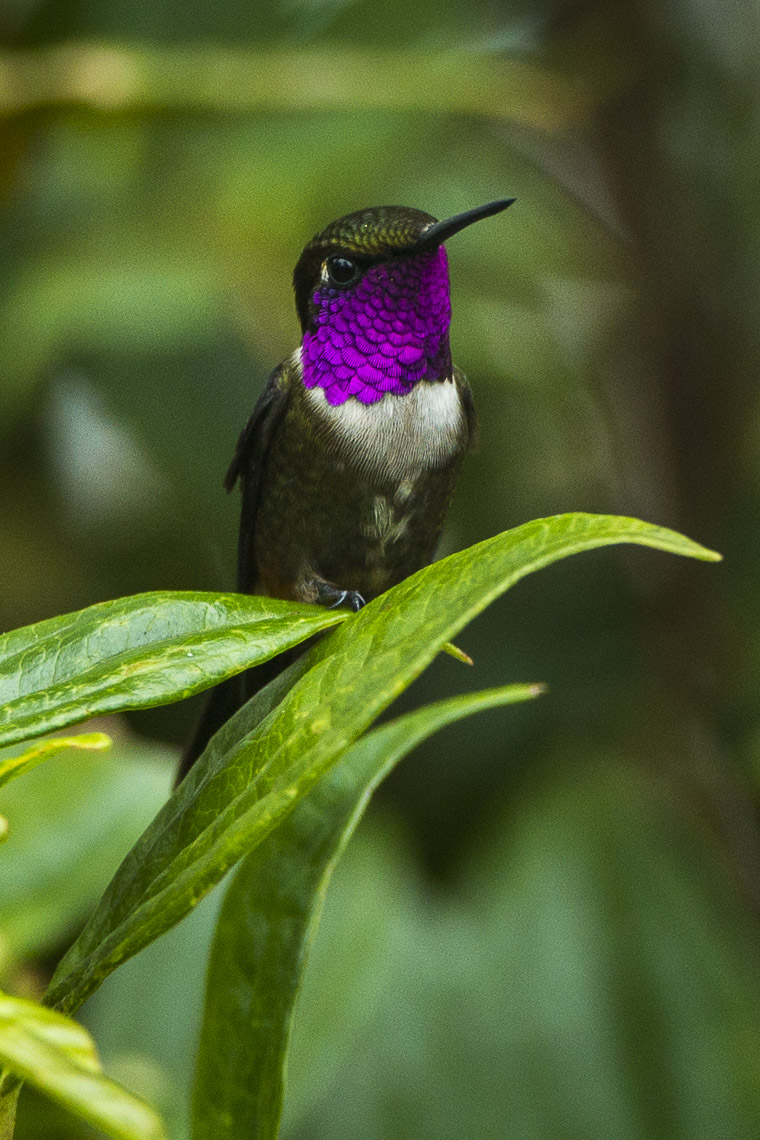
Purple-throated woodstar

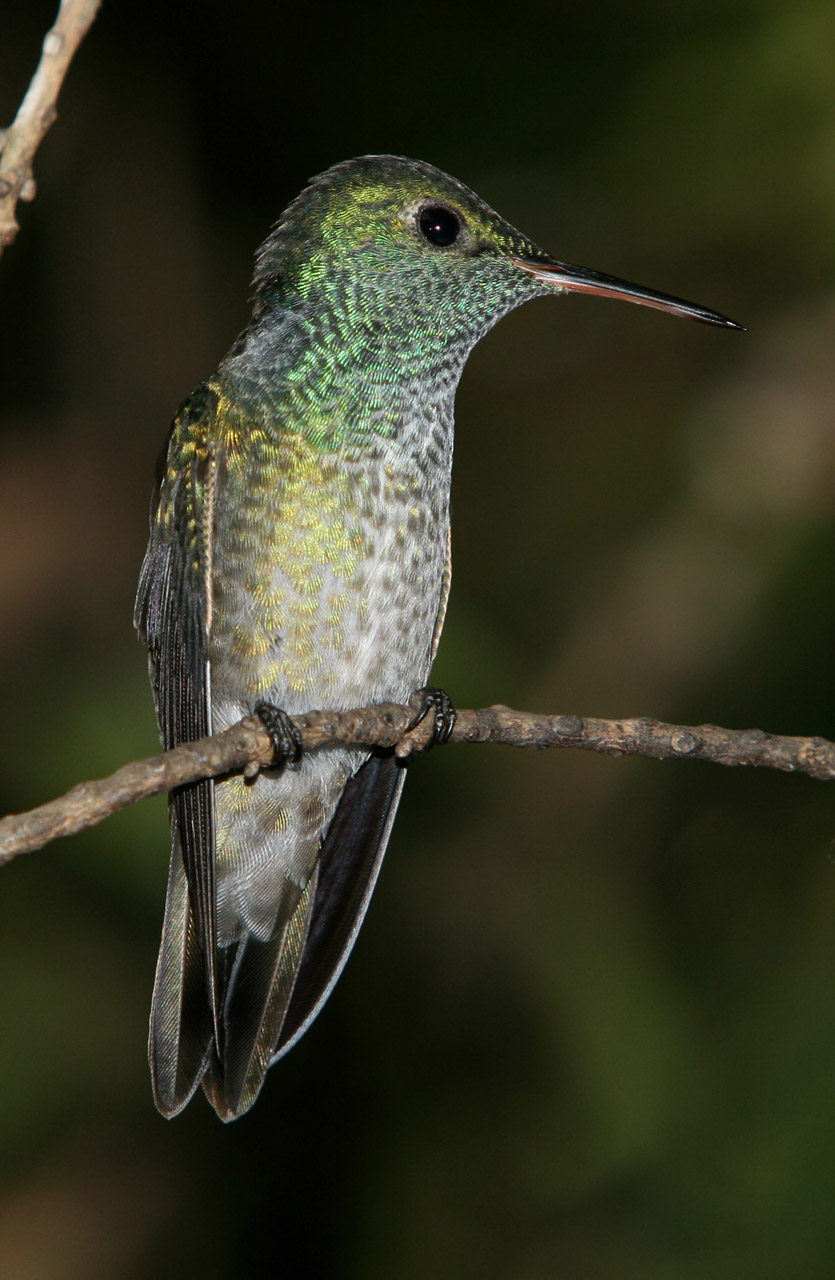
Versicolored emerald
- Crimson topaz, Topaza pella (E-SA)
- Fiery topaz, Topaza pyra (E-SA)
- White-necked jacobin, Florisuga mellivora
- Black jacobin, Florisuga fusca (E-SA)
- White-tipped sicklebill, Eutoxeres aquila
- Buff-tailed sicklebill, Eutoxeres condamini (E-SA)
- Saw-billed hermit, Ramphodon naevius (E-BR)
- Hook-billed hermit, Glaucis dohrnii (E-BR)
- Bronzy hermit, Glaucis aeneus
- Rufous-breasted hermit, Glaucis hirsutus
- Band-tailed barbthroat, Threnetes ruckeri
- Pale-tailed barbthroat, Threnetes leucurus (E-SA)
- Sooty barbthroat, Threnetes niger (E-SA)
- Broad-tipped hermit, Anopetia gounellei (E-BR)
- Dusky-throated hermit, Phaethornis squalidus (E-BR)
- Streak-throated hermit, Phaethornis rupurumii (E-SA)
- Little hermit, Phaethornis longuemareus (E-SA)
- Tapajos hermit, Phaethornis aethopygus (E-BR)
- Minute hermit, Phaethornis idaliae (E-BR)
- Cinnamon-throated hermit, Phaethornis nattereri (E-SA)
- Black-throated hermit, Phaethornis atrimentalis (E-SA)
- Stripe-throated hermit, Phaethornis striigularis
- Gray-chinned hermit, Phaethornis griseogularis (E-SA)
- Reddish hermit, Phaethornis ruber (E-SA)
- White-browed hermit, Phaethornis stuarti (E-SA)
- Buff-bellied hermit, Phaethornis subochraceus (E-SA)
- Sooty-capped hermit, Phaethornis augusti (E-SA)
- Planalto hermit, Phaethornis pretrei (E-SA)
- Scale-throated hermit, Phaethornis eurynome (E-SA)
- Pale-bellied hermit, Phaethornis anthophilus
- White-bearded hermit, Phaethornis hispidus (E-SA)
- White-whiskered hermit, Phaethornis yaruqui (E-SA)
- Green hermit, Phaethornis guy
- Tawny-bellied hermit, Phaethornis syrmatophorus (E-SA)
- Koepcke's hermit, Phaethornis koepckeae (E-PE)
- Needle-billed hermit, Phaethornis philippii (E-SA)
- Straight-billed hermit, Phaethornis bourcieri (E-SA)
- Long-billed hermit, Phaethornis longirostris
- Long-tailed hermit, Phaethornis superciliosus (E-SA)
- Great-billed hermit, Phaethornis malaris (E-SA)
- Green-fronted lancebill, Doryfera ludovicae
- Blue-fronted lancebill, Doryfera johannae (E-SA)
- White-throated daggerbill, Schistes albogularis (E-SA)
- Geoffroy's daggerbill, Schistes geoffroyi (E-SA)
- Hyacinth visorbearer, Augastes scutatus (E-BR)
- Hooded visorbearer, Augastes lumachella (E-BR)
- Brown violetear, Colibri delphinae
- Lesser violetear, Colibri cyanotus
- Sparkling violetear, Colibri coruscans (E-SA)
- White-vented violetear, Colibri serrirostris (E-SA)
- Tooth-billed hummingbird, Androdon aequatorialis
- Horned sungem, Heliactin bilophus (E-SA)
- Purple-crowned fairy, Heliothryx barroti
- Black-eared fairy, Heliothryx auritus (E-SA)
- White-tailed goldenthroat, Polytmus guainumbi (E-SA)
- Tepui goldenthroat, Polytmus milleri (E-VE)
- Green-tailed goldenthroat, Polytmus theresiae (E-SA)
- Fiery-tailed awlbill, Avocettula recurvirostris (E-SA)
- Ruby-topaz hummingbird, Chrysolampis mosquitus
- Green-throated mango, Anthracothorax viridigula (E-SA)
- Green-breasted mango, Anthracothorax prevostii
- Black-throated mango, Anthracothorax nigricollis
- Orange-throated sunangel, Heliangelus mavors (E-SA)
- Amethyst-throated sunangel, Heliangelus amethysticollis (E-SA)
- Gorgeted sunangel, Heliangelus strophianus (E-SA)
- Tourmaline sunangel, Heliangelus exortis (E-SA)
- Little sunangel, Heliangelus micraster (E-SA)
- Purple-throated sunangel, Heliangelus viola (E-SA)
- Bogota sunangel, Heliangelus zusii (E-CO)(possibly extinct)
- Royal sunangel, Heliangelus regalis (E-SA)
- Green-backed firecrown, Sephanoides sephaniodes (E-SA)
- Juan Fernandez firecrown, Sephanoides fernandensis (E-CH)
- Green thorntail, Discosura conversii
- Wire-crested thorntail, Discosura popelairii
- Black-bellied thorntail, Discosura langsdorffi
- Coppery thorntail, Discosura letitiae (E-BO)
- Racket-tipped thorntail, Discosura longicaudus (E-SA)
- Tufted coquette, Lophornis ornatus (E-SA)
- Dot-eared coquette, Lophornis gouldii (E-SA)
- Frilled coquette, Lophornis magnificus (E-BR)
- Rufous-crested coquette, Lophornis delattrei
- Spangled coquette, Lophornis stictolophus (E-SA)
- Butterfly coquette, Lophornis verreauxii (E-SA)
- Festive coquette, Lophornis chalybeus (E-BR)
- Peacock coquette, Lophornis pavoninus (E-SA)
- Ecuadorian piedtail, Phlogophilus hemileucurus (E-SA)
- Peruvian piedtail, Phlogophilus harterti (E-PE)
- Speckled hummingbird, Adelomyia melanogenys (E-SA)
- Long-tailed sylph, Aglaiocercus kingii (E-SA)
- Violet-tailed sylph, Aglaiocercus coelestis (E-SA)
- Venezuelan sylph, Aglaiocercus berlepschi (E-VE)
- Red-tailed comet, Sappho sparganurus (E-SA)
- Bronze-tailed comet, Polyonymus caroli (E-PE)
- Gray-bellied comet, Taphrolesbia griseiventris (E-PE)
- Andean hillstar, Oreotrochilus estella (E-SA)
- White-sided hillstar, Oreotrochilus leucopleurus (E-SA)
- Ecuadorian hillstar, Oreotrochilus chimborazo (E-SA)
- Blue-throated hillstar, Oreotrochilus cyanolaemus (E-EC)
- Green-headed hillstar, Oreotrochilus stolzmanni (E-SA)
- Black-breasted hillstar, Oreotrochilus melanogaster (E-PE)
- Wedge-tailed hillstar, Oreotrochilus adela (E-SA)
- Mountain avocetbill, Opisthoprora euryptera (E-SA)
- Black-tailed trainbearer, Lesbia victoriae (E-SA)
- Green-tailed trainbearer, Lesbia nuna (E-SA)
- Black-backed thornbill, Ramphomicron dorsale (E-CO)
- Purple-backed thornbill, Ramphomicron microrhynchum (E-SA)
- Bearded mountaineer, Oreonympha nobilis (E-PE)
- Buffy helmetcrest, Oxypogon stuebelii (E-CO)
- Blue-bearded helmetcrest, Oxypogon cyanolaemus (E-CO)
- White-bearded helmetcrest, Oxypogon lindenii (E-VE)
- Green-bearded helmetcrest, Oxypogon guerinii (E-CO)
- Rufous-capped thornbill, Chalcostigma ruficeps (E-SA)
- Olivaceous thornbill, Chalcostigma olivaceum (E-SA)
- Blue-mantled thornbill, Chalcostigma stanleyi (E-SA)
- Bronze-tailed thornbill, Chalcostigma heteropogon (E-SA)
- Rainbow-bearded thornbill, Chalcostigma herrani (E-SA)
- Tyrian metaltail, Metallura tyrianthina (E-SA)
- Perija metaltail, Metallura iracunda (E-SA)
- Viridian metaltail, Metallura williami (E-SA)
- Violet-throated metaltail, Metallura baroni (E-EC)
- Neblina metaltail, Metallura odomae (E-SA)
- Coppery metaltail, Metallura theresiae (E-PE)
- Fire-throated metaltail, Metallura eupogon (E-PE)
- Scaled metaltail, Metallura aeneocauda (E-SA)
- Black metaltail, Metallura phoebe (E-PE)
- Greenish puffleg, Haplophaedia aureliae
- Buff-thighed puffleg, Haplophaedia assimilis (E-SA)
- Hoary puffleg, Haplophaedia lugens (E-SA)
- Black-breasted puffleg, Eriocnemis nigrivestis (E-EC)
- Gorgeted puffleg, Eriocnemis isabellae (E-CO)
- Glowing puffleg, Eriocnemis vestita (E-SA)
- Black-thighed puffleg, Eriocnemis derbyi (E-SA)
- Turquoise-throated puffleg, Eriocnemis godini (E-SA)
- Coppery-bellied puffleg, Eriocnemis cupreoventris (E-SA)
- Sapphire-vented puffleg, Eriocnemis luciani (E-SA)
- Golden-breasted puffleg, Eriocnemis mosquera (E-SA)
- Blue-capped puffleg, Eriocnemis glaucopoides (E-SA)
- Colorful puffleg, Eriocnemis mirabilis (E-CO)
- Emerald-bellied puffleg, Eriocnemis aline (E-SA)
- Marvelous spatuletail, Loddigesia mirabilis (E-PE)
- Shining sunbeam, Aglaeactis cupripennis (E-SA)
- White-tufted sunbeam, Aglaeactis castelnaudii (E-PE)
- Purple-backed sunbeam, Aglaeactis aliciae (E-PE)
- Black-hooded sunbeam, Aglaeactis pamela (E-BO)
- Bronzy inca, Coeligena coeligena (E-SA)
- Brown inca, Coeligena wilsoni (E-SA)
- Black inca, Coeligena prunellei (E-CO)
- Collared inca, Coeligena torquata (E-SA)
- Violet-throated starfrontlet, Coeligena violifer (E-SA)
- Rainbow starfrontlet, Coeligena iris (E-SA)
- White-tailed starfrontlet, Coeligena phalerata (E-CO)
- Dusky starfrontlet, Coeligena orina (E-CO)
- Buff-winged starfrontlet, Coeligena lutetiae (E-SA)
- Golden-bellied starfrontlet, Coeligena bonapartei (E-SA)
- Blue-throated starfrontlet, Coeligena helianthea (E-SA)
- Mountain velvetbreast, Lafresnaya lafresnayi (E-SA)
- Sword-billed hummingbird, Ensifera ensifera (E-SA)
- Great sapphirewing, Pterophanes cyanopterus (E-SA)
- Buff-tailed coronet, Boissonneaua flavescens (E-SA)
- Chestnut-breasted coronet, Boissonneaua matthewsii (E-SA)
- Velvet-purple coronet, Boissonneaua jardini (E-SA)
- Booted racket-tail, Ocreatus underwoodii (E-SA)
- Rufous-gaped hillstar, Urochroa bougueri (E-SA)
- Green-backed hillstar, Urochroa leucura (E-SA)
- Purple-bibbed whitetip, Urosticte benjamini (E-SA)
- Rufous-vented whitetip, Urosticte ruficrissa (E-SA)
- Velvet-browed brilliant, Heliodoxa xanthogonys (E-SA)
- Pink-throated brilliant, Heliodoxa gularis (E-SA)
- Rufous-webbed brilliant, Heliodoxa branickii (E-PE)
- Black-throated brilliant, Heliodoxa schreibersii (E-SA)
- Gould's jewelfront, Heliodoxa aurescens (E-SA)
- Fawn-breasted brilliant, Heliodoxa rubinoides (E-SA)
- Green-crowned brilliant, Heliodoxa jacula
- Empress brilliant, Heliodoxa imperatrix (E-SA)
- Violet-fronted brilliant, Heliodoxa leadbeateri (E-SA)
- Brazilian ruby, Heliodoxa rubricauda (E-BR)
- Northern giant-hummingbird, Patagona peruviana (E-SA)
- Southern giant-hummingbird, Patagona gigas (E-SA)
- Violet-chested hummingbird, Sternoclyta cyanopectus (E-SA)
- Scissor-tailed hummingbird, Hylonympha macrocerca (E-VE)
- Long-billed starthroat, Heliomaster longirostris
- Stripe-breasted starthroat, Heliomaster squamosus (E-BR)
- Blue-tufted starthroat, Heliomaster furcifer (E-SA)
- Purple-collared woodstar, Myrtis fanny (E-SA)
- Chilean woodstar, Eulidia yarrellii (E-CH)
- Oasis hummingbird, Rhodopis vesper (E-SA)
- Peruvian sheartail, Thaumastura cora (E-SA)
- White-bellied woodstar, Chaetocercus mulsant (E-SA)
- Little woodstar, Chaetocercus bombus (E-SA)
- Gorgeted woodstar, Chaetocercus heliodor (E-SA)
- Santa Marta woodstar, Chaetocercus astreans (E-CO)
- Esmeraldas woodstar, Chaetocercus berlepschi (E-EC)
- Rufous-shafted woodstar, Chaetocercus jourdanii (E-SA)
- Short-tailed woodstar, Myrmia micrura (E-SA)
- Slender-tailed woodstar, Microstilbon burmeisteri (E-SA)
- Amethyst woodstar, Calliphlox amethystina
- Purple-throated woodstar, Philodice mitchellii (E-SA)
- Western emerald, Chlorostilbon melanorhynchus (E-SA)
- Red-billed emerald, Chlorostilbon gibsoni (E-SA)
- Blue-tailed emerald, Chlorostilbon mellisugus (E-SA)
- Chiribiquete emerald, Chlorostilbon olivaresi (E-CO)
- Glittering-bellied emerald, Chlorostilbon lucidus (E-SA)
- Coppery emerald, Chlorostilbon russatus (E-SA)
- Narrow-tailed emerald, Chlorostilbon stenurus (E-SA)
- Green-tailed emerald, Chlorostilbon alice (E-VE)
- Short-tailed emerald, Chlorostilbon poortmani (E-SA)
- Violet-headed hummingbird, Klais guimeti
- Green-crowned plovercrest, Stephanoxis lalandi (E-BR)
- Purple-crowned plovercrest, Stephanoxis loddigesii (E-SA)
- Santa Marta blossomcrown, Anthocephala floriceps (E-CO)
- Tolima blossomcrown, Anthocephala berlepschi (E-CO)
- Gray-breasted sabrewing, Campylopterus largipennis (E-SA)
- Outcrop sabrewing, Campylopterus calcirupicola (E-BR)
- Diamantina sabrewing, Campylopterus diamantinensis (E-BR)
- Rufous-breasted sabrewing, Campylopterus hyperythrus (E-SA)
- White-tailed sabrewing, Campylopterus ensipennis (E-SA)
- Lazuline sabrewing, Campylopterus falcatus (E-SA)
- Santa Marta sabrewing, Campylopterus phainopeplus (E-CO)
- Napo sabrewing, Campylopterus villaviscensio (E-SA)
- Buff-breasted sabrewing, Campylopterus duidae (E-SA)
- White-vented plumeleteer, Chalybura buffonii
- Bronze-tailed plumeleteer, Chalybura urochrysia
- Crowned woodnymph, Thalurania colombica
- Fork-tailed woodnymph, Thalurania furcata (E-SA)
- Long-tailed woodnymph, Thalurania watertonii (E-BR)
- Violet-capped woodnymph, Thalurania glaucopis (E-SA)
- Pirre hummingbird, Goldmania bella
- Violet-capped hummingbird, Goldmania violiceps
- Scaly-breasted hummingbird, Phaeochroa cuvierii
- Buffy hummingbird, Leucippus fallax (E-SA)
- Tumbes hummingbird, Thaumasius baeri (E-SA)
- Spot-throated hummingbird, Thaumasius taczanowskii (E-SA)
- Many-spotted hummingbird, Taphrospilus hypostictus (E-SA)
- Swallow-tailed hummingbird, Eupetomena macroura (E-SA)
- Sombre hummingbird, Eupetomena cirrochloris (E-BR)
- Olive-spotted hummingbird, Talaphorus chlorocercus (E-SA)
- Snowy-bellied hummingbird, Saucerottia edward
- Steely-vented hummingbird, Saucerottia saucerottei
- Indigo-capped hummingbird, Saucerottia cyanifrons (E-CO)
- Chestnut-bellied hummingbird, Saucerottia castaneiventris (E-CO)
- Green-bellied hummingbird, Saucerottia viridigaster (E-SA)
- Copper-rumped hummingbird, Saucerottia tobaci (E-SA)
- Rufous-tailed hummingbird, Amazilia tzacatl
- Amazilia hummingbird, Amazilis amazilia (E-SA)
- Andean emerald, Uranomitra franciae (E-SA)
- Versicolored emerald, Chrysuronia versicolor (E-SA)
- Shining-green hummingbird, Chrysuronia goudoti (E-SA)
- Golden-tailed sapphire, Chrysuronia oenone (E-SA)
- Sapphire-throated hummingbird, Chrysuronia coeruleogularis
- Sapphire-bellied hummingbird, Chrysuronia lilliae (E-CO)
- Humboldt's sapphire, Chrysuronia humboldtii
- Blue-headed sapphire, Chrysuronia grayi (E-SA)
- White-chested emerald, Chrysuronia brevirostris (E-SA)
- Plain-bellied emerald, Chrysuronia leucogaster (E-SA)
- White-throated hummingbird, Leucochloris albicollis (E-SA)
- Glittering-throated emerald, Chionomesa fimbriata (E-SA)
- Sapphire-spangled emerald, Chionomesa lactea (E-SA)
- Rufous-throated sapphire, Hylocharis sapphirina (E-SA)
- Gilded hummingbird, Hylocharis chrysura (E-SA)
- White-bellied hummingbird, Elliotomyia chionogaster (E-SA)
- Green-and-white hummingbird, Elliotomyia viridicauda (E-PE)
- Blue-chested hummingbird, Polyerata amabilis
- Purple-chested hummingbird, Polyerata rosenbergi (E-SA)
- Blue-throated goldentail, Chlorestes eliciae
- White-chinned sapphire, Chlorestes cyanus (E-SA)
- Violet-bellied hummingbird, Chlorestes julie
- Blue-chinned sapphire, Chlorestes notata (E-SA)

== Hoatzin ==
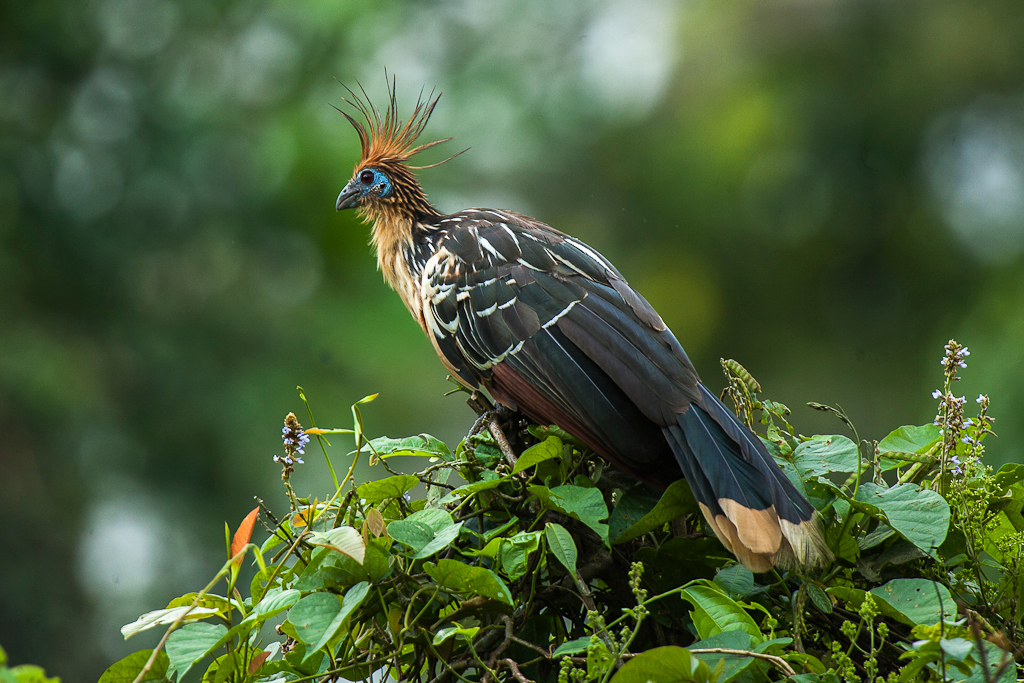
Hoatzin

Order: Opisthocomiformes Family: Opisthocomidae

The hoatzin is pheasant-sized, but much slimmer. It has a long tail and neck, but a small head with an unfeathered blue face and red eyes which are topped by a spiky crest. It is a weak flier which is found in the swamps of the Amazon and Orinoco rivers.

- Hoatzin, Opisthocomus hoazin (E-SA)

== Limpkin ==
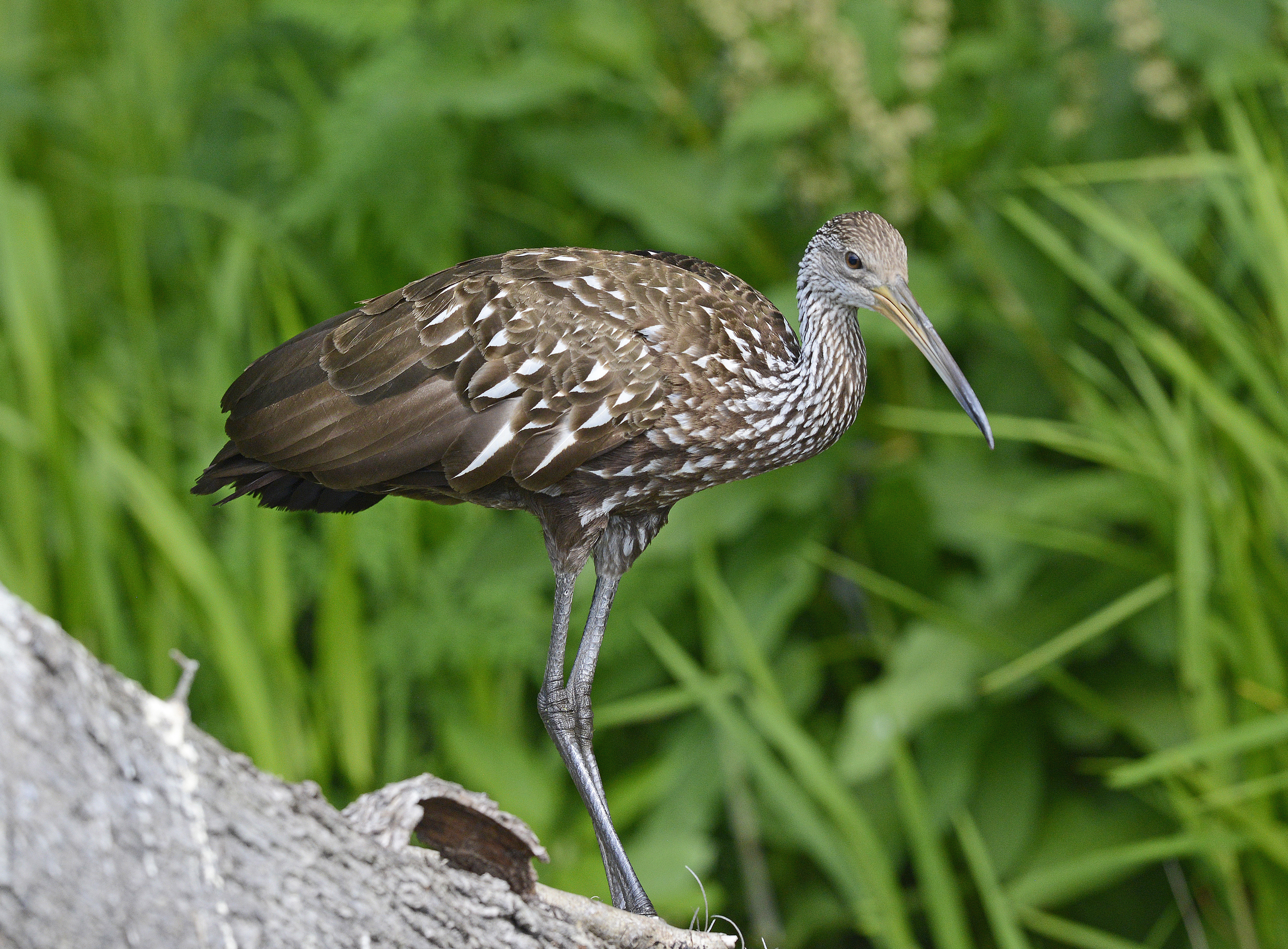
Limpkin

Order: Gruiformes Family: Aramidae

The limpkin resembles a large rail. It has drab-brown plumage and a grayer head and neck.

- Limpkin, Aramus guarauna

== Trumpeters ==
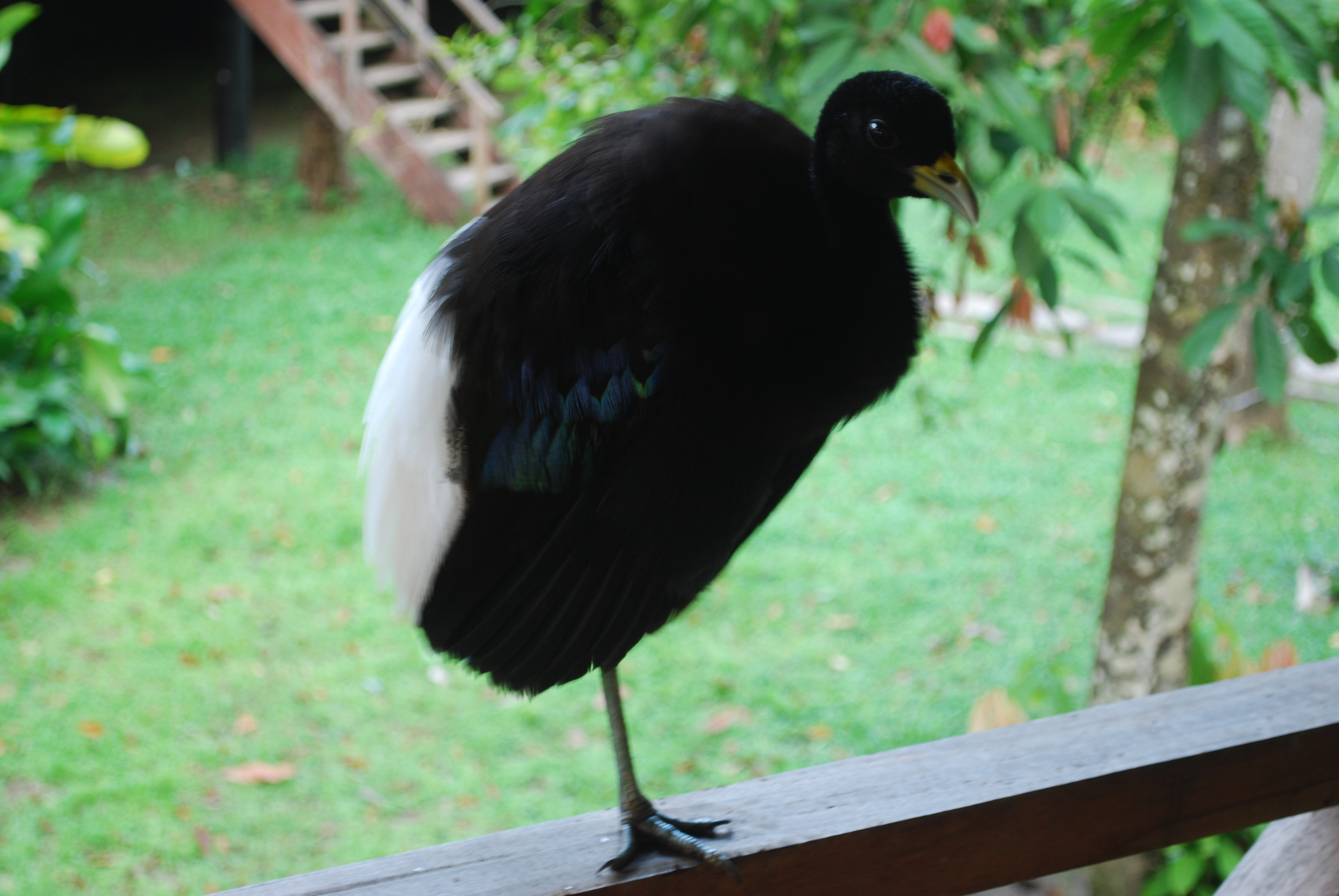
Pale-winged trumpeter

Order: Gruiformes Family: Psophiidae

Trumpeters are dumpy birds with long necks and legs and chicken-like bills. They are named for the trumpeting call of the male

- Gray-winged trumpeter, Psophia crepitans (E-SA)
- Pale-winged trumpeter, Psophia leucoptera (E-SA)
- Dark-winged trumpeter, Psophia viridis (E-BR)

== Rails ==
Order: Gruiformes Family: Rallidae

Rallidae is a large family of small to medium-sized birds which includes the rails, crakes, coots, and gallinules. Typically they inhabit dense vegetation in damp environments near lakes, swamps, or rivers. In general they are shy and secretive birds, making them difficult to observe. Most species have strong legs and long toes which are well adapted to soft uneven surfaces. They tend to have short, rounded wings and to be weak fliers.

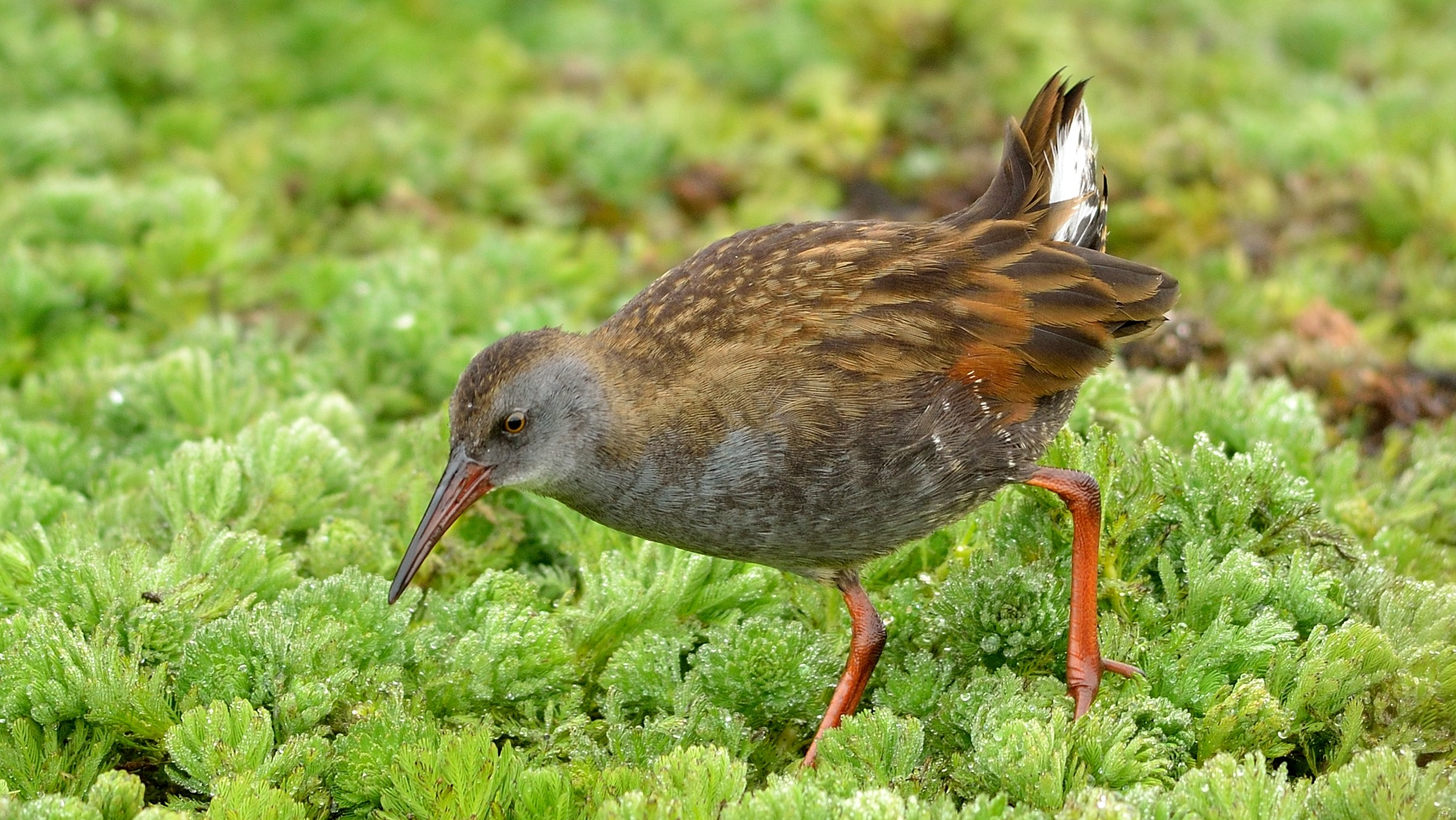
Bogota rail

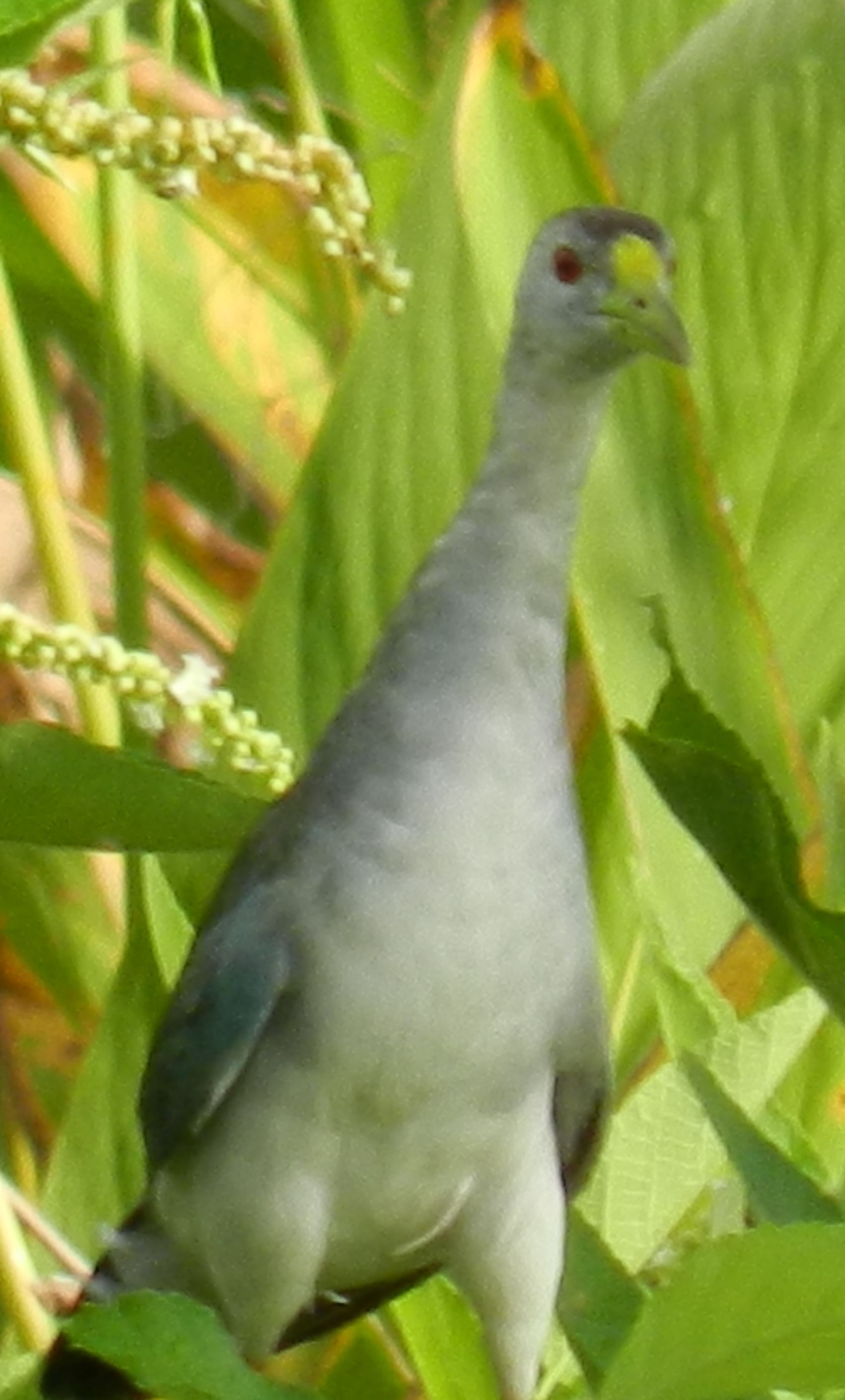
Azure gallinule

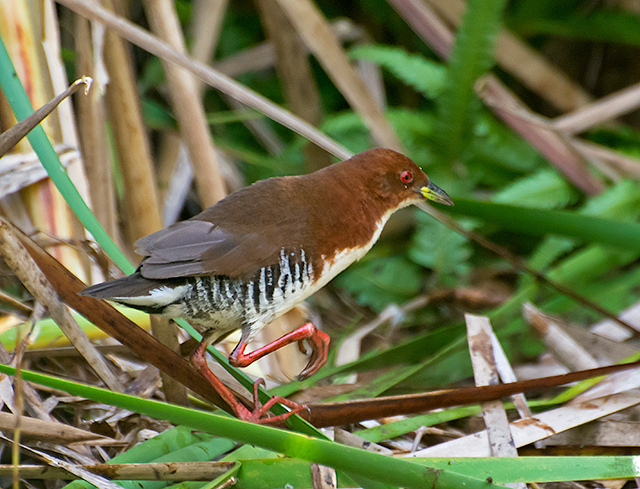
Rufous-sided crake

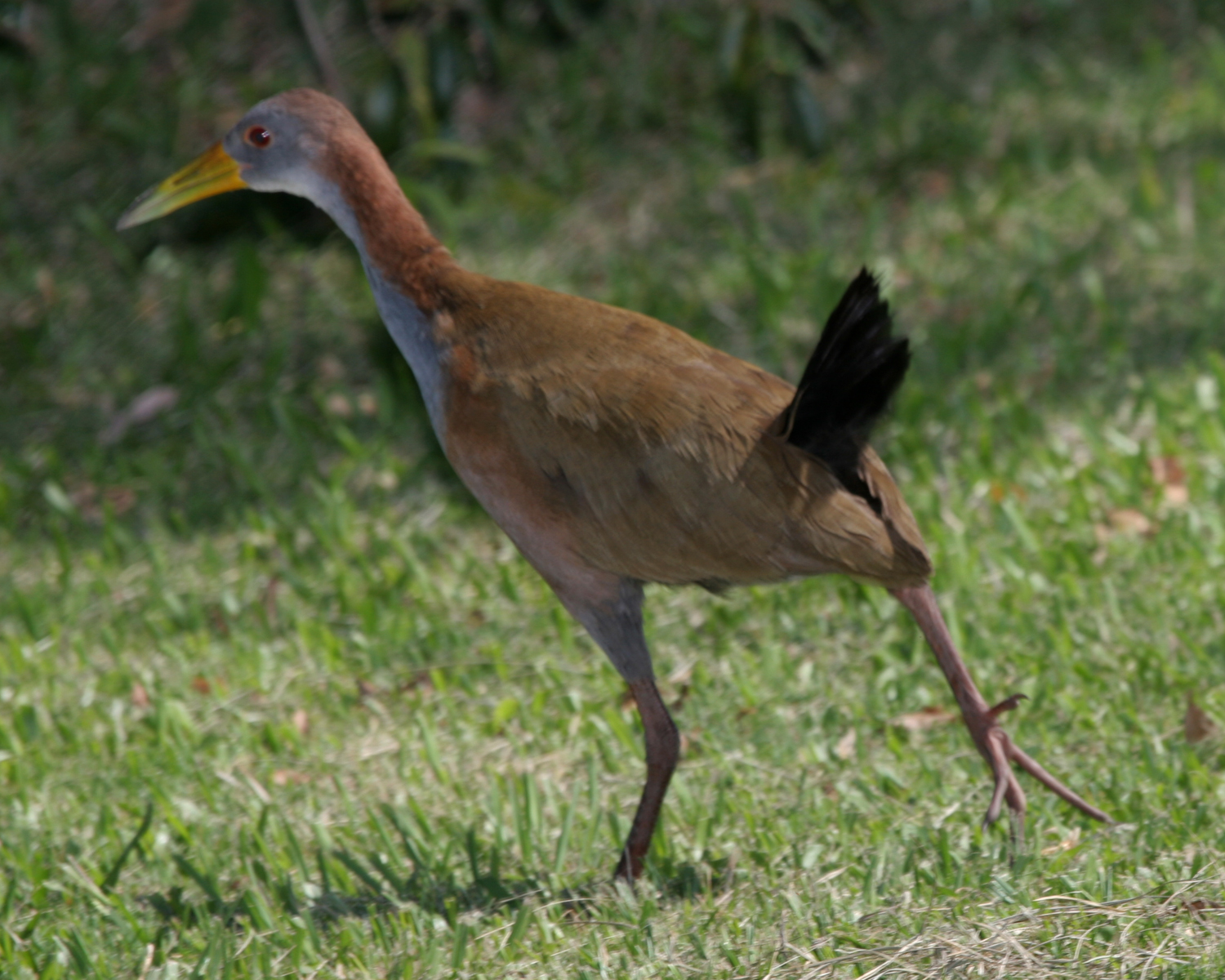
Giant wood-rail

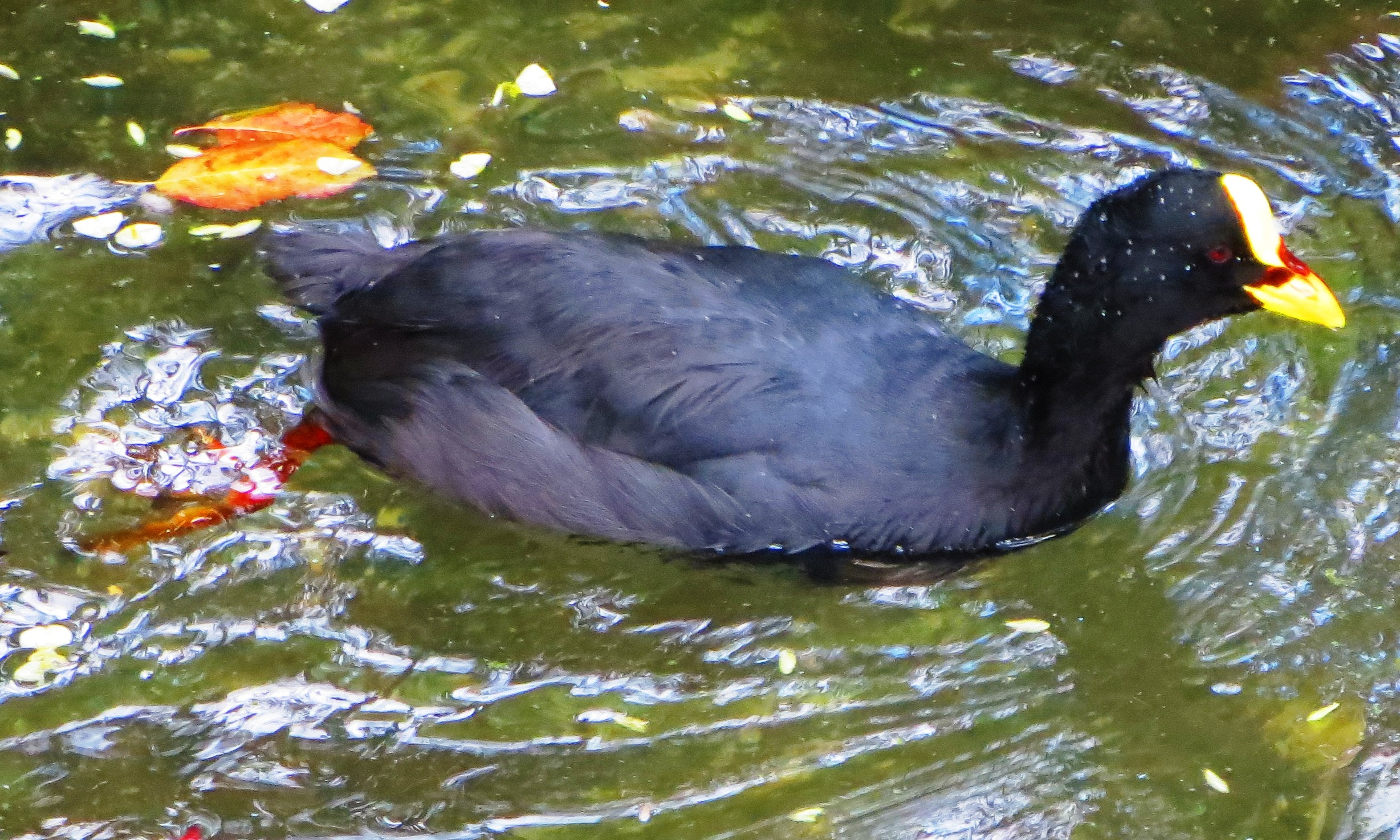
Red-gartered coot
- Corn crake, Crex crex (V)
- Mangrove rail, Rallus longirostris
- Plain-flanked rail, Rallus wetmorei (E-VE)
- Virginia rail, Rallus limicola
- Bogota rail, Rallus semiplumbeus (E-SA)
- Austral rail, Rallus antarcticus (E-SA)
- Purple gallinule, Porphyrio martinica (All)
- Azure gallinule, Porphyrio flavirostris (E-SA)
- Chestnut-headed crake, Anurolimnas castaneiceps (E-SA)
- Russet-crowned crake, Anurolimnas viridis (E-SA)
- Black-banded crake, Anurolimnas fasciatus (E-SA)
- Rusty-flanked crake, Laterallus levraudi (E-VE)
- Rufous-sided crake, Laterallus melanophaius (E-SA)
- White-throated crake, Laterallus albigularis
- Gray-breasted crake, Laterallus exilis
- Galapagos rail, Laterallus spilonota (E-GA)
- Black rail, Laterallus jamaicensis
- Red-and-white crake, Laterallus leucopyrrhus (E-SA)
- Rufous-faced crake, Laterallus xenopterus (E-SA)
- Speckled rail, Coturnicops notatus (E-SA)
- Ocellated crake, Micropygia schomburgkii (E-SA)
- Ash-throated crake, Mustelirallus albicollis (E-SA)
- Colombian crake, Mustelirallus colombianus
- Paint-billed crake, Mustelirallus erythrops
- Spotted rail, Pardirallus maculatus
- Blackish rail, Pardirallus nigricans (E-SA)
- Plumbeous rail, Pardirallus sanguinolentus (E-SA)
- Giant wood-rail, Aramides ypecaha (E-SA)
- Brown wood-rail, Aramides wolfi (E-SA)
- Little wood-rail, Aramides mangle (E-BR)
- Gray-cowled wood-rail, Aramides cajaneus
- Rufous-necked wood-rail, Aramides axillaris
- Red-winged wood-rail, Aramides calopterus (E-SA)
- Slaty-breasted wood-rail, Aramides saracura (E-SA)
- Uniform crake, Amaurolimnas concolor
- Spot-flanked gallinule, Porphyriops melanops (E-SA)
- Yellow-breasted crake, Porzana flaviventer
- Dot-winged crake, Porzana spiloptera (E-SA)
- Sora, Porzana carolina
- Common gallinule, Gallinula galeata
- Lesser moorhen, Gallinula angulata (V)
- Red-fronted coot, Fulica rufifrons (E-SA)
- Horned coot, Fulica cornuta (E-SA)
- Giant coot, Fulica gigantea (E-SA)
- Red-gartered coot, Fulica armillata (E-SA)
- American coot, Fulica americana
- Slate-colored coot, Fulica ardesiaca (E-SA)
- White-winged coot, Fulica leucoptera (E-SA)

== Finfoots ==
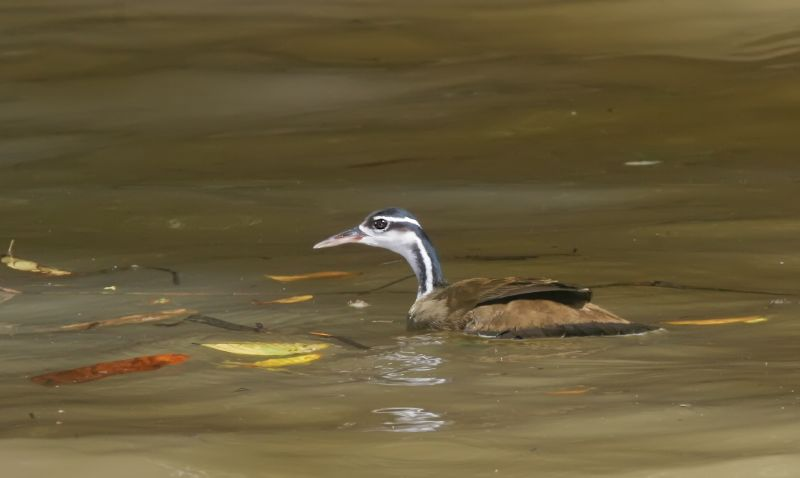
Sungrebe

Order: Gruiformes Family: Heliornithidae

Heliornithidae is a small family of tropical birds with webbed lobes on their feet similar to those of grebes and coots.

- Sungrebe, Heliornis fulica

== Plovers ==
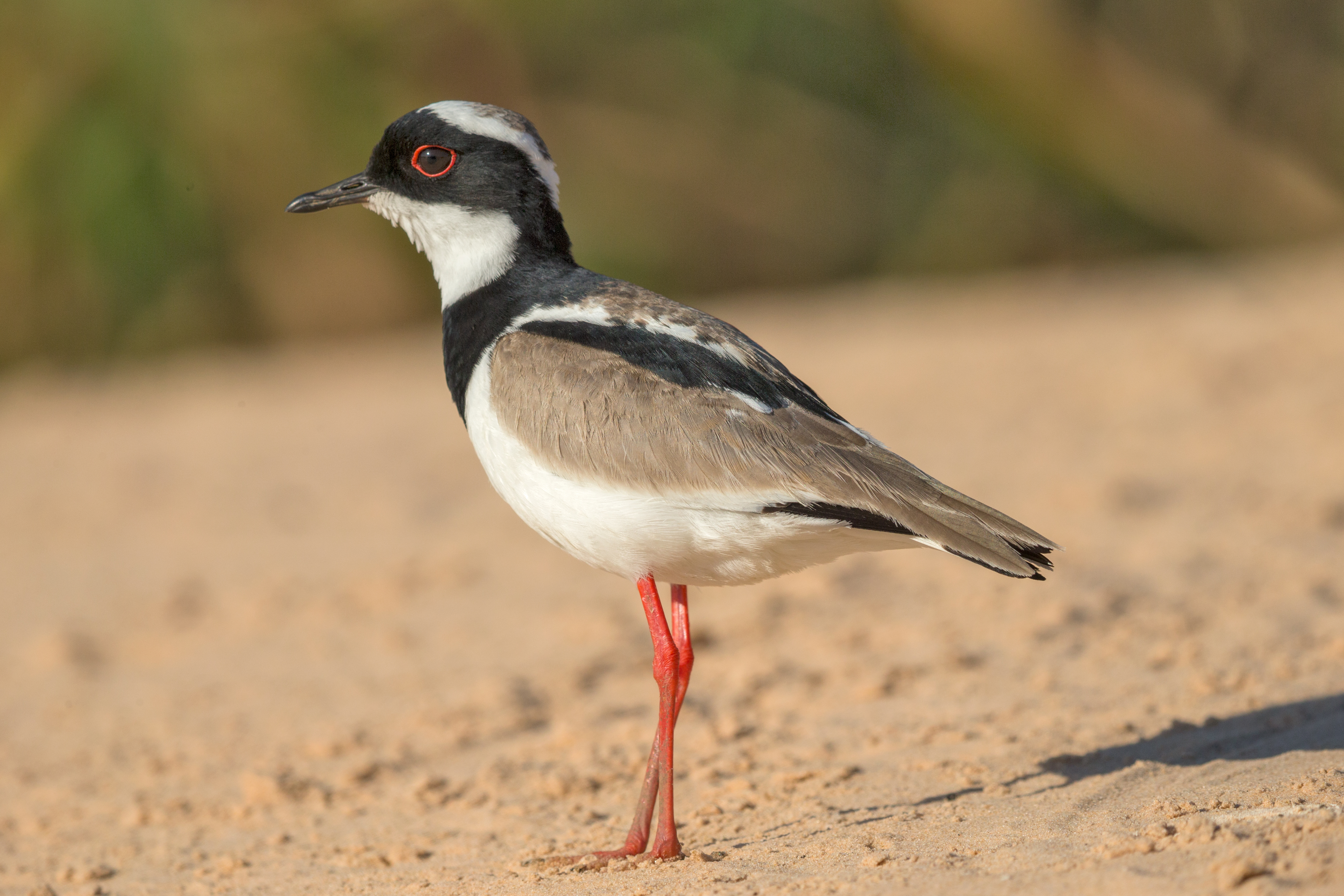
Pied lapwing

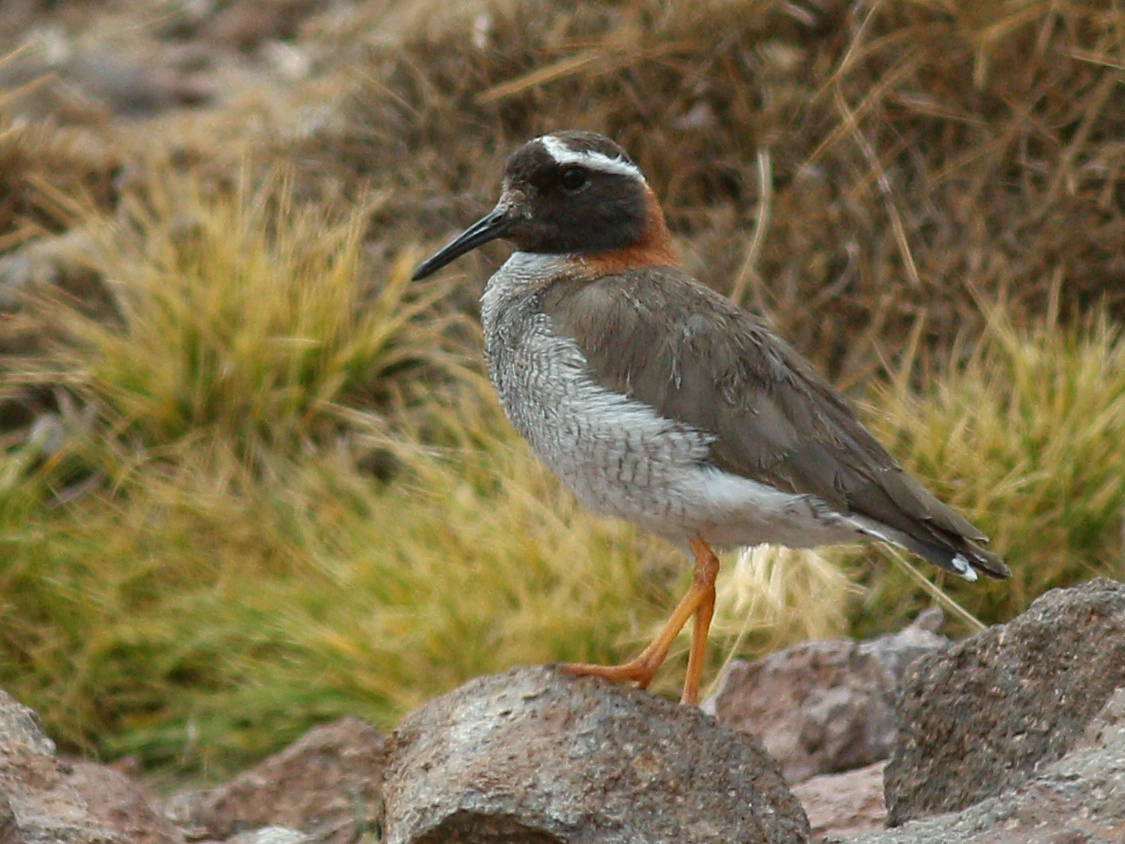
Diademed sandpiper-plover

Order: Charadriiformes Family: Charadriidae

The family Charadriidae includes the plovers, dotterels, and lapwings. They are small to medium-sized birds with compact bodies, short thick necks, and long, usually pointed, wings. They are found in open country worldwide, mostly in habitats near water.

- Black-bellied plover, Pluvialis squatarola
- American golden-plover, Pluvialis dominica (All)
- Pacific golden-plover, Pluvialis fulva (V)
- Tawny-throated dotterel, Oreopholus ruficollis (E-SA)
- Pied lapwing, Hoploxypterus cayanus (E-SA)
- Diademed sandpiper-plover, Phegornis mitchellii (E-SA)
- Rufous-chested dotterel, Zonibyx modestus (E-SA)
- Killdeer, Charadrius vociferus
- Semipalmated plover, Charadrius semipalmatus
- Piping plover, Charadrius melodus (V)
- Southern lapwing, Vanellus chilensis (All)
- Andean lapwing, Vanellus resplendens (E-SA)
- Lesser sand-plover, Anarynchus mongolus (V)
- Wilson's plover, Anarynchus wilsonia
- Collared plover, Anarynchus collaris
- Puna plover, Anarynchus alticola (E-SA)
- Two-banded plover, Anarynchus falklandicus (E-SA)
- Snowy plover, Anarynchus nivosus

== Oystercatchers ==
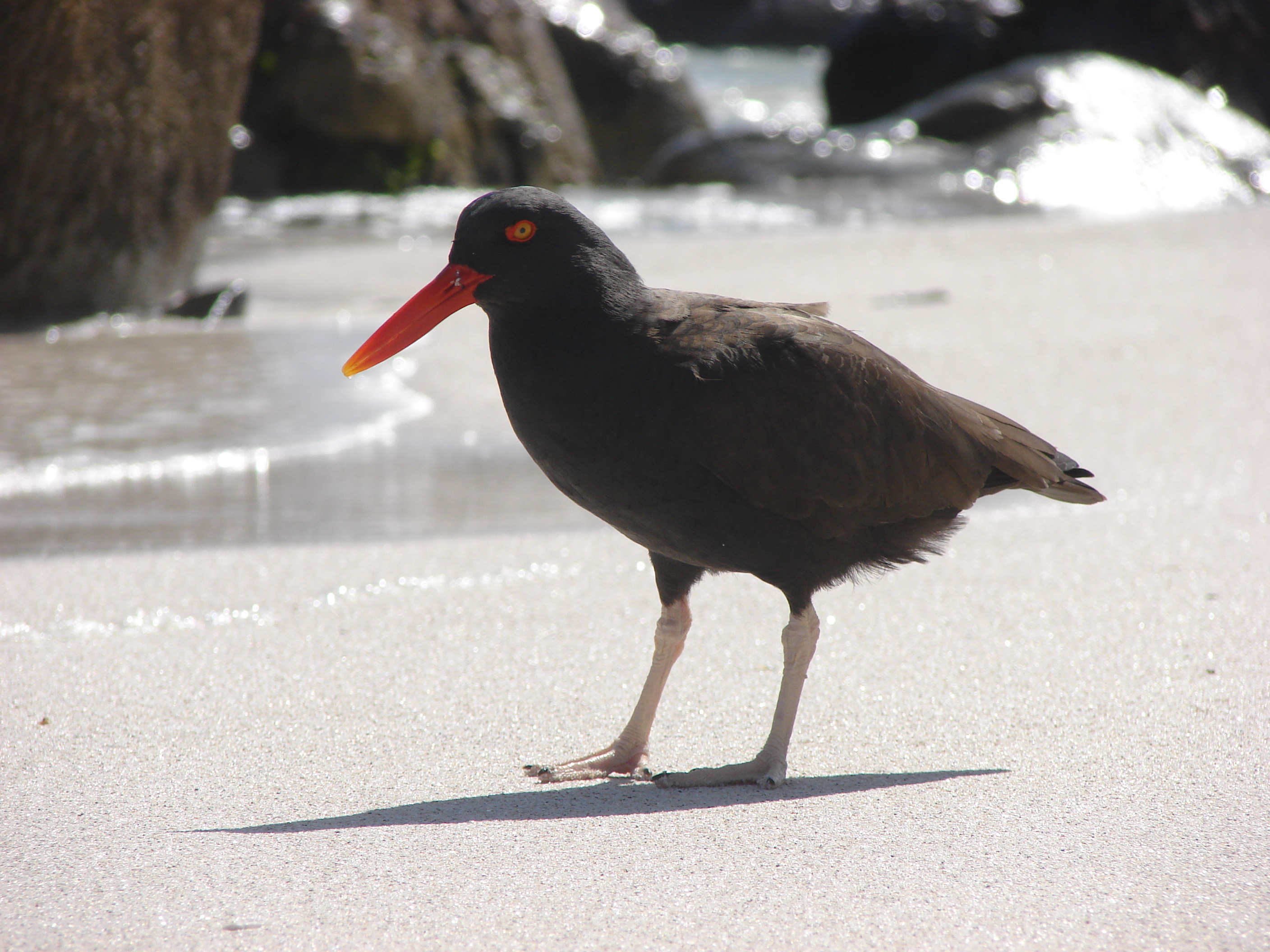
Blackish oystercatcher

Order: Charadriiformes Family: Haematopodidae

The oystercatchers are large and noisy plover-like birds, with strong bills used for smashing or prising open molluscs.

- American oystercatcher, Haematopus palliatus
- Blackish oystercatcher, Haematopus ater (E-SA)
- Magellanic oystercatcher, Haematopus leucopodus (E-SA)

== Avocets and stilts ==
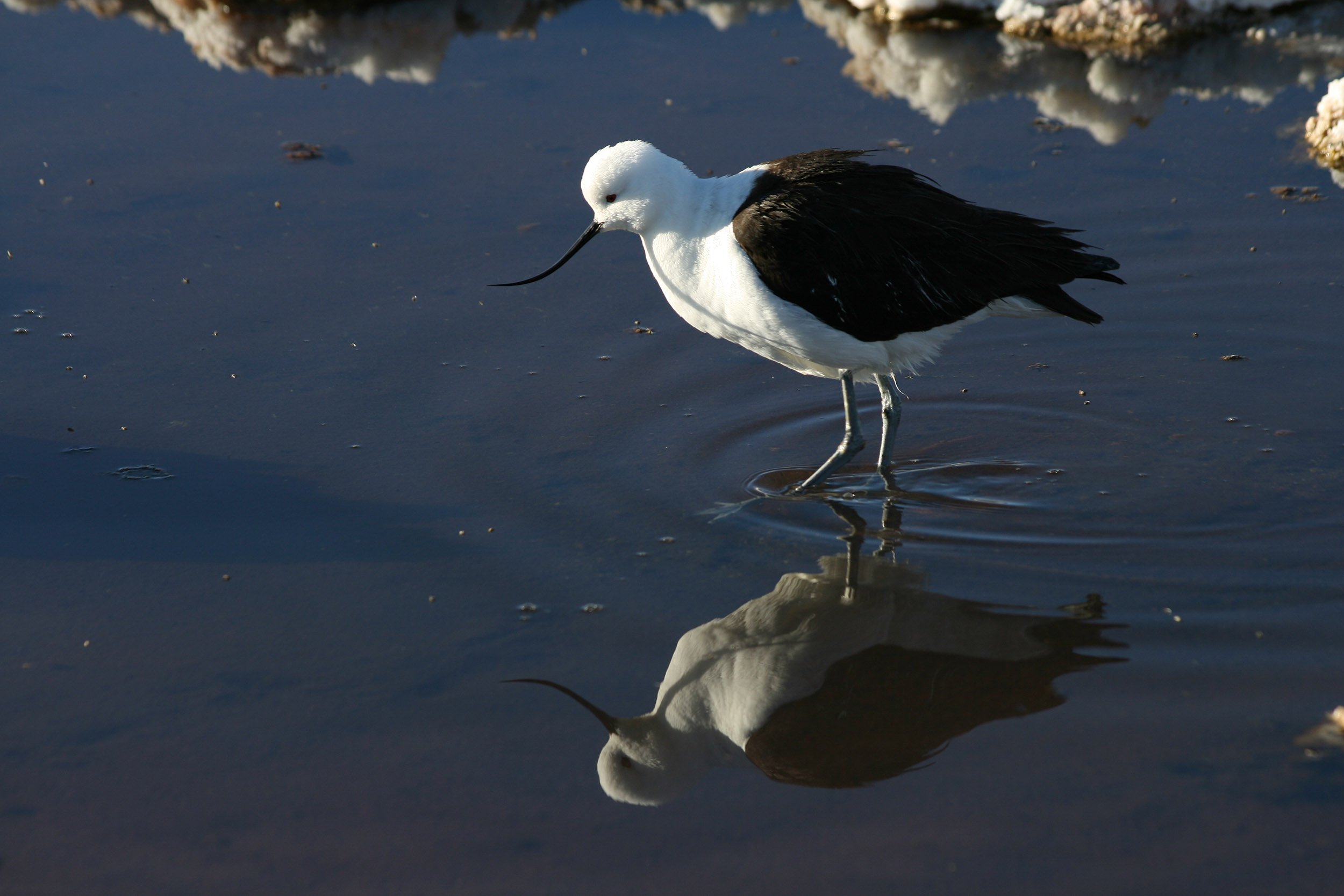
Andean avocet

Order: Charadriiformes Family: Recurvirostridae

Recurvirostridae is a family of large wading birds which includes the avocets and stilts. The avocets have long legs and long up-curved bills. The stilts have extremely long legs and long, thin, straight bills.

- Black-necked stilt, Himantopus mexicanus (All)
- American avocet, Recurvirostra americana (V)
- Andean avocet, Recurvirostra andina (E-SA)

== Thick-knees ==
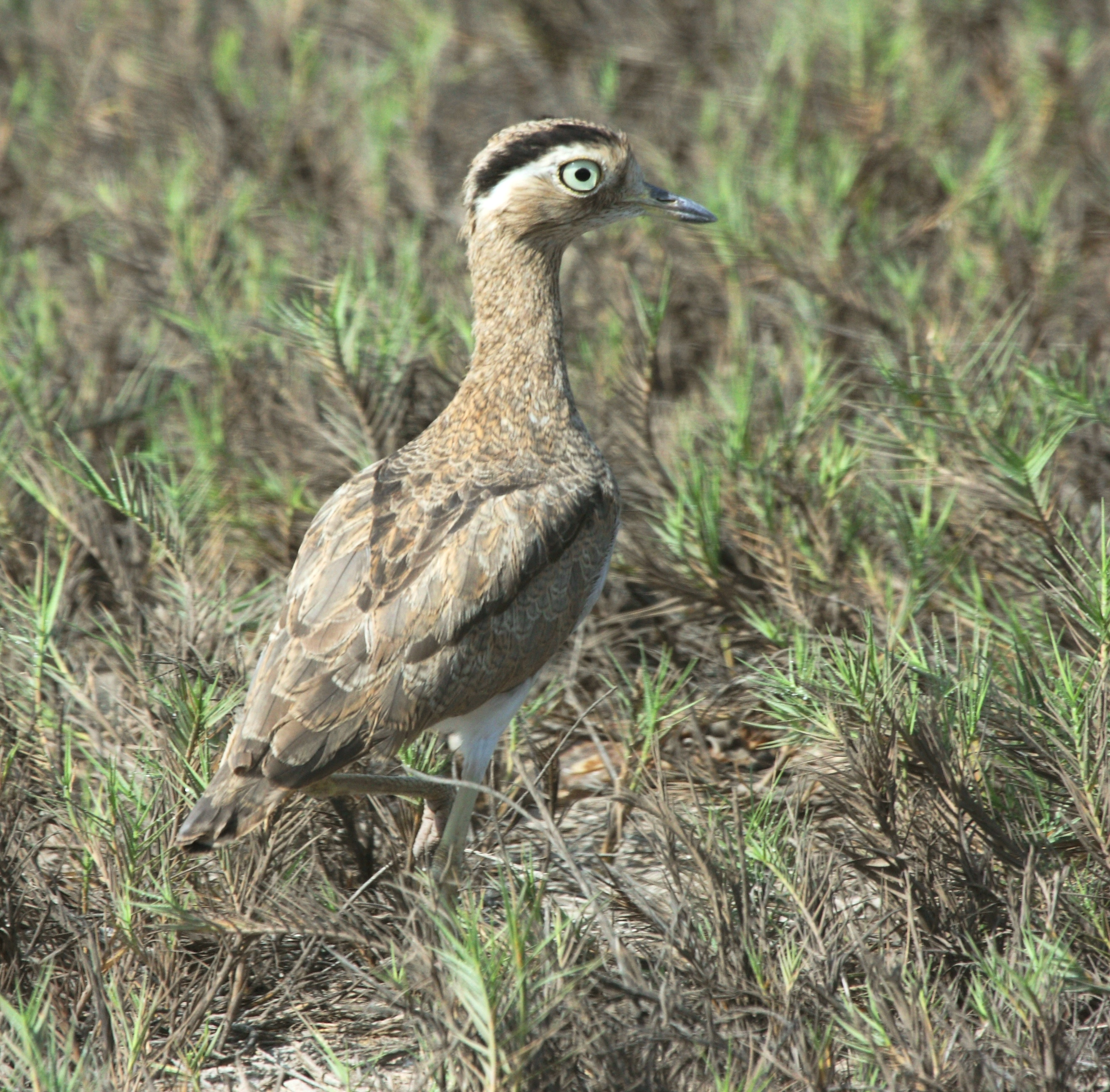
Peruvian thick-knee

Order: Charadriiformes Family: Burhinidae

The thick-knees are a group of waders found worldwide within the tropical zone, with some species also breeding in temperate Europe and Australia. They are medium to large waders with strong black or yellow-black bills, large yellow eyes, and cryptic plumage. Despite being classed as waders, most species have a preference for arid or semi-arid habitats.

- Double-striped thick-knee, Hesperoburhinus bistriatus
- Peruvian thick-knee, Hesperoburhinus superciliaris (E-SA)

== Sheathbills ==
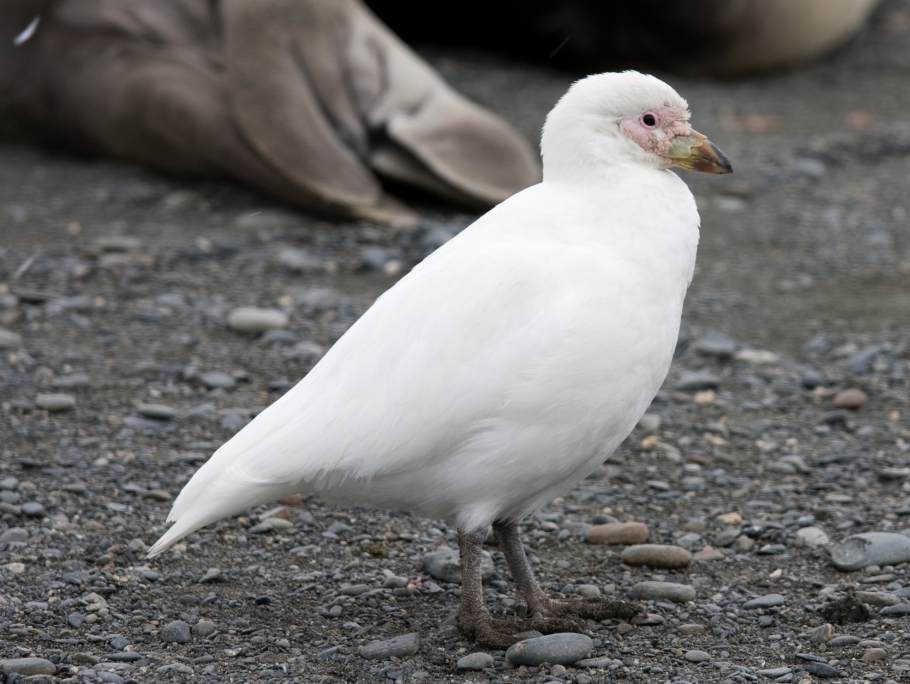
Snowy sheathbill

Order: Charadriiformes Family: Chionidae

The sheathbills are scavengers of the Antarctic regions. They have white plumage and look plump and dove-like but are believed to be similar to the ancestors of the modern gulls and terns.

- Snowy sheathbill, Chionis albus

== Magellanic plover ==
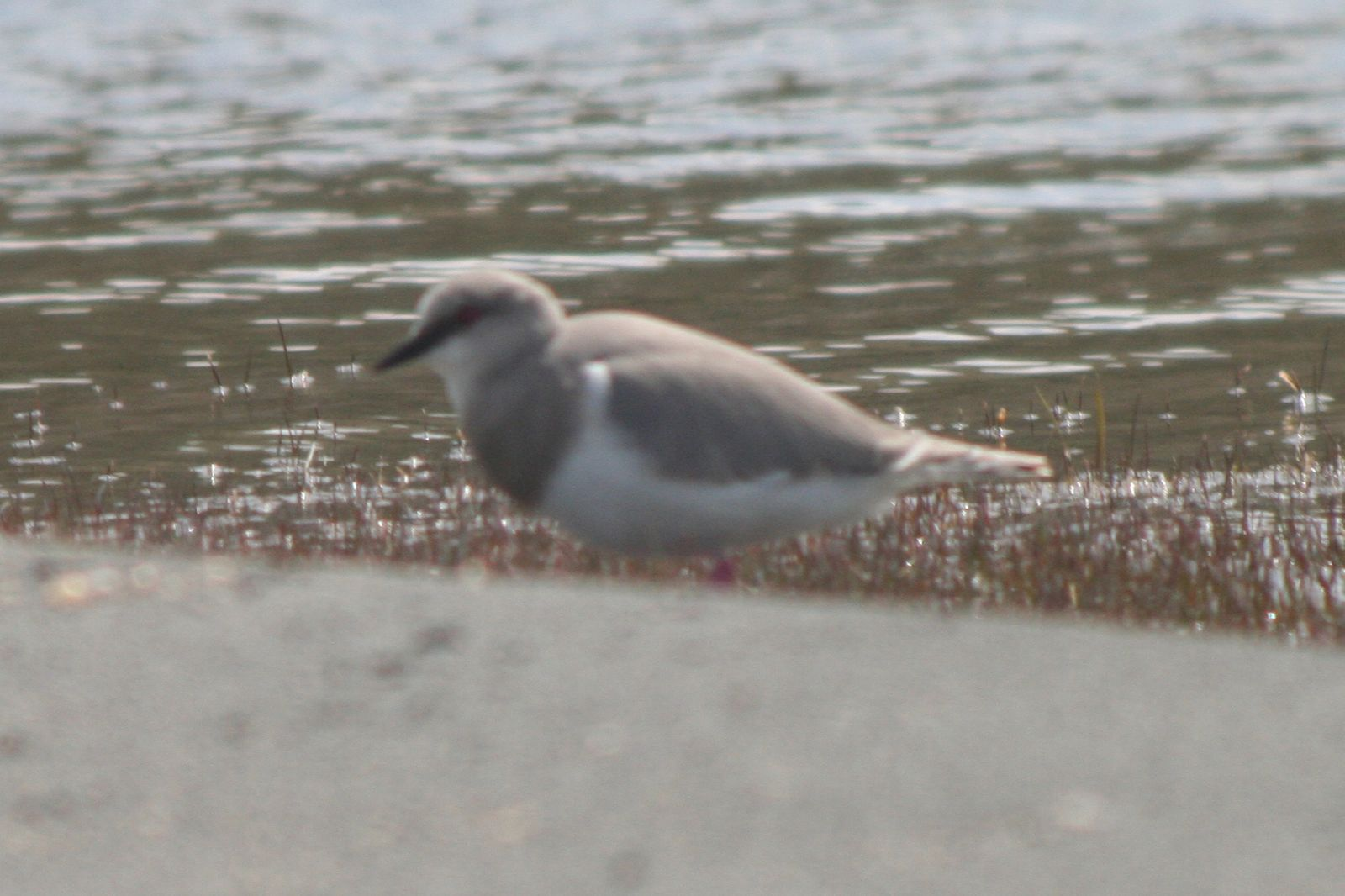
Magellanic plover

Order: Charadriiformes Family: Pluvianellidae

The Magellanic plover is a rare wader found only in southernmost South America. In its build and habits it is similar to a turnstone. Its upperparts and breast are pale gray and the rest of the underparts are white. It has short red legs, a black bill and a red eye. In young birds, the eyes and legs are yellowish.

- Magellanic plover, Pluvianellus socialis (E-SA)

== Sandpipers ==
Order: Charadriiformes Family: Scolopacidae

Scolopacidae is a large diverse family of small to medium-sized shorebirds including the sandpipers, curlews, godwits, shanks, tattlers, woodcocks, snipes, dowitchers, and phalaropes. The majority of these species eat small invertebrates picked out of the mud or soil. Variation in length of legs and bills enables multiple species to feed in the same habitat, particularly on the coast, without direct competition for food.

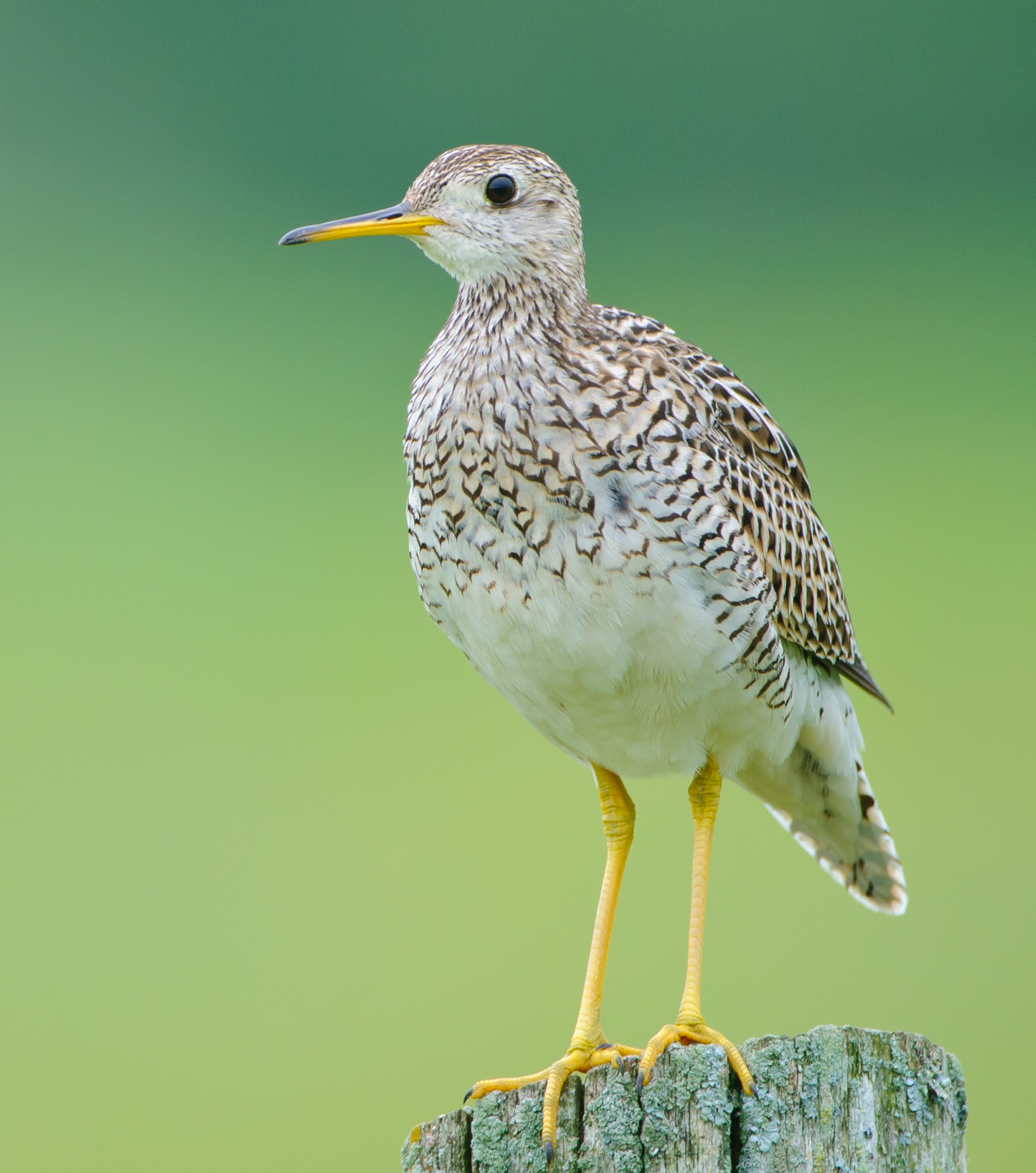
Upland sandpiper

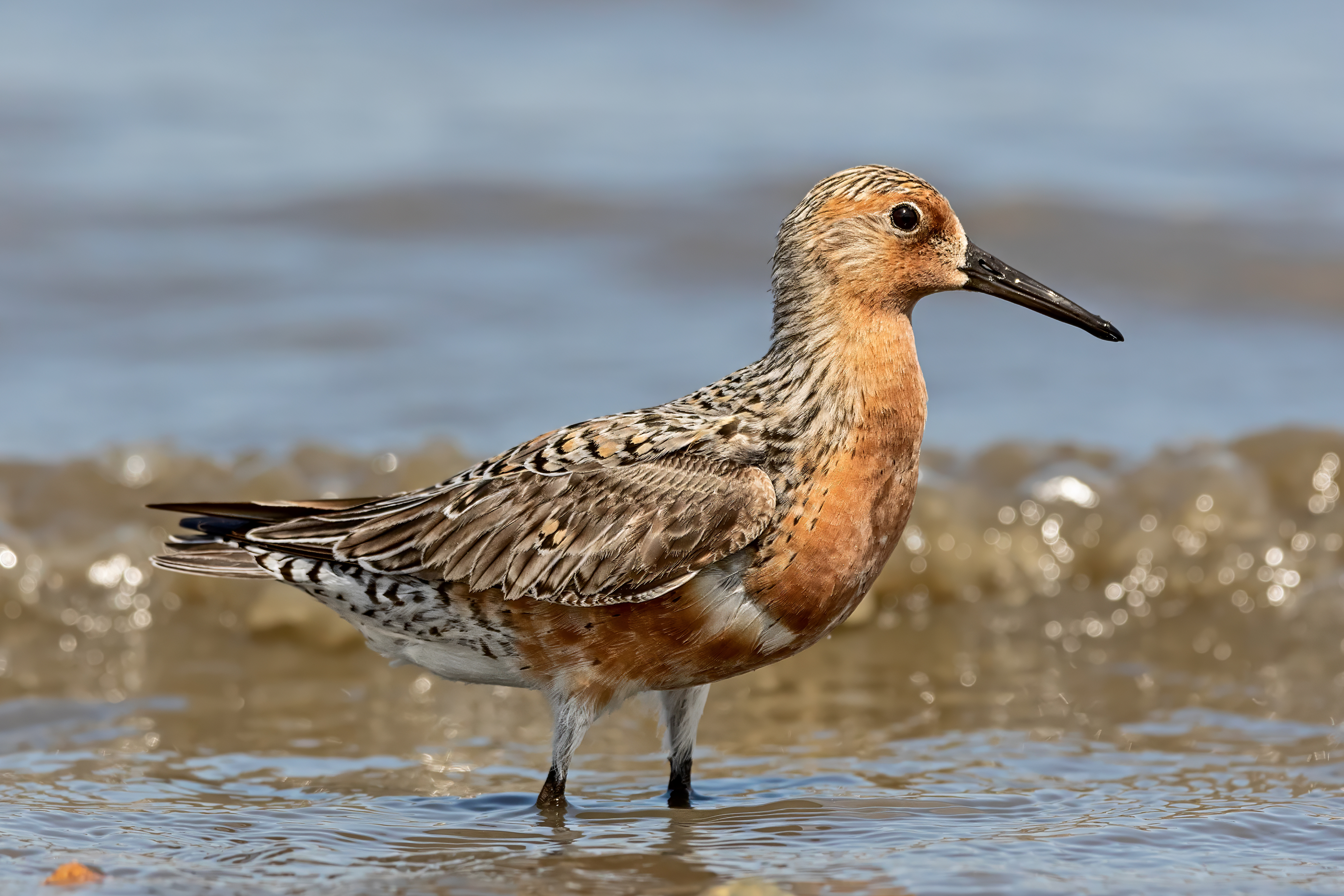
Red knot

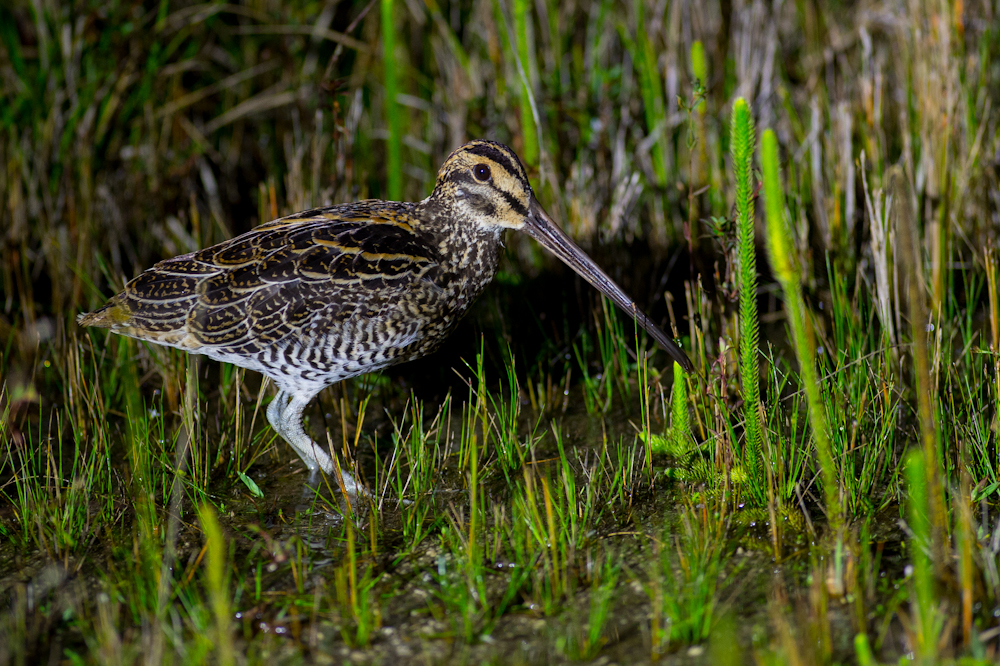
Giant snipe

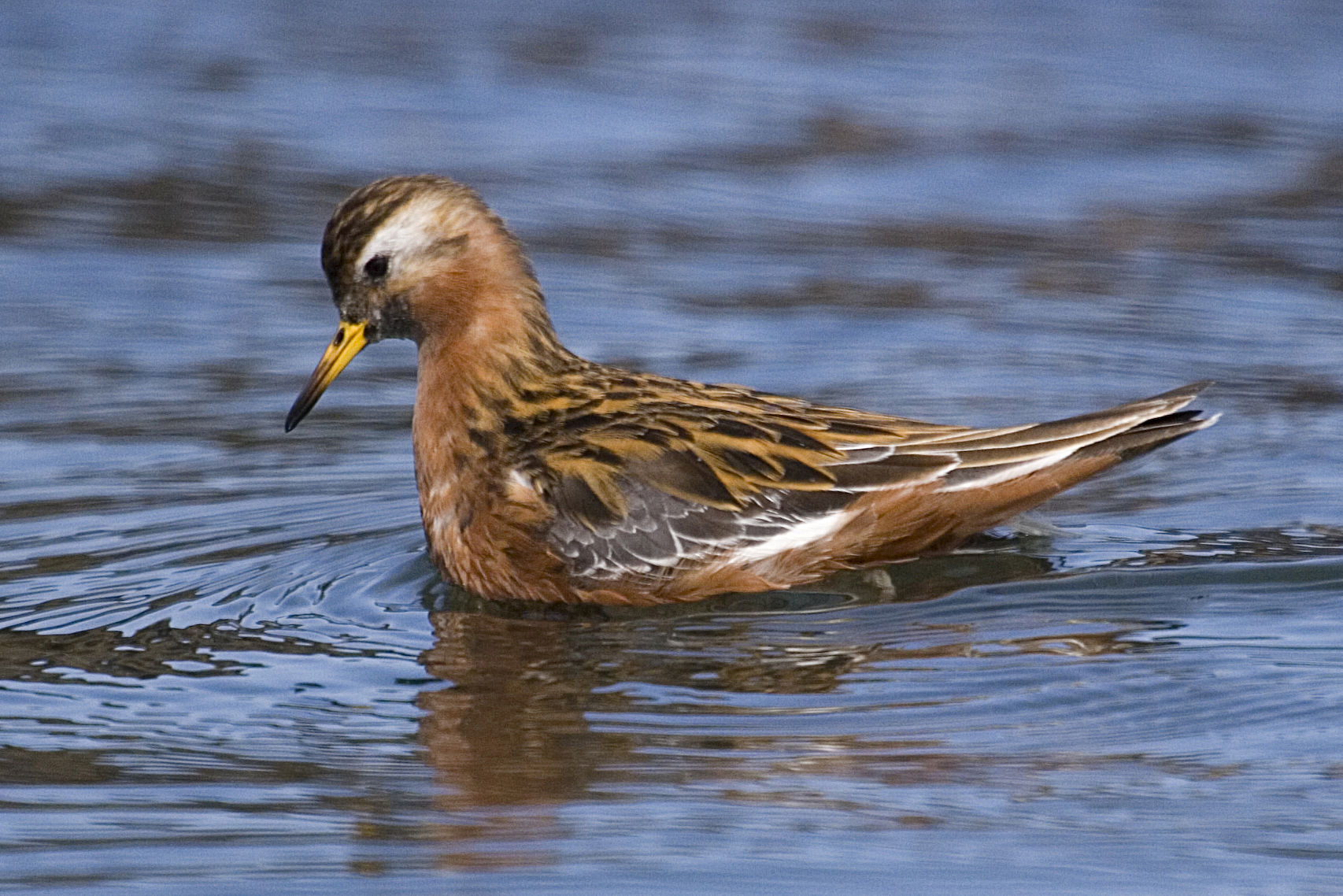
Red phalarope

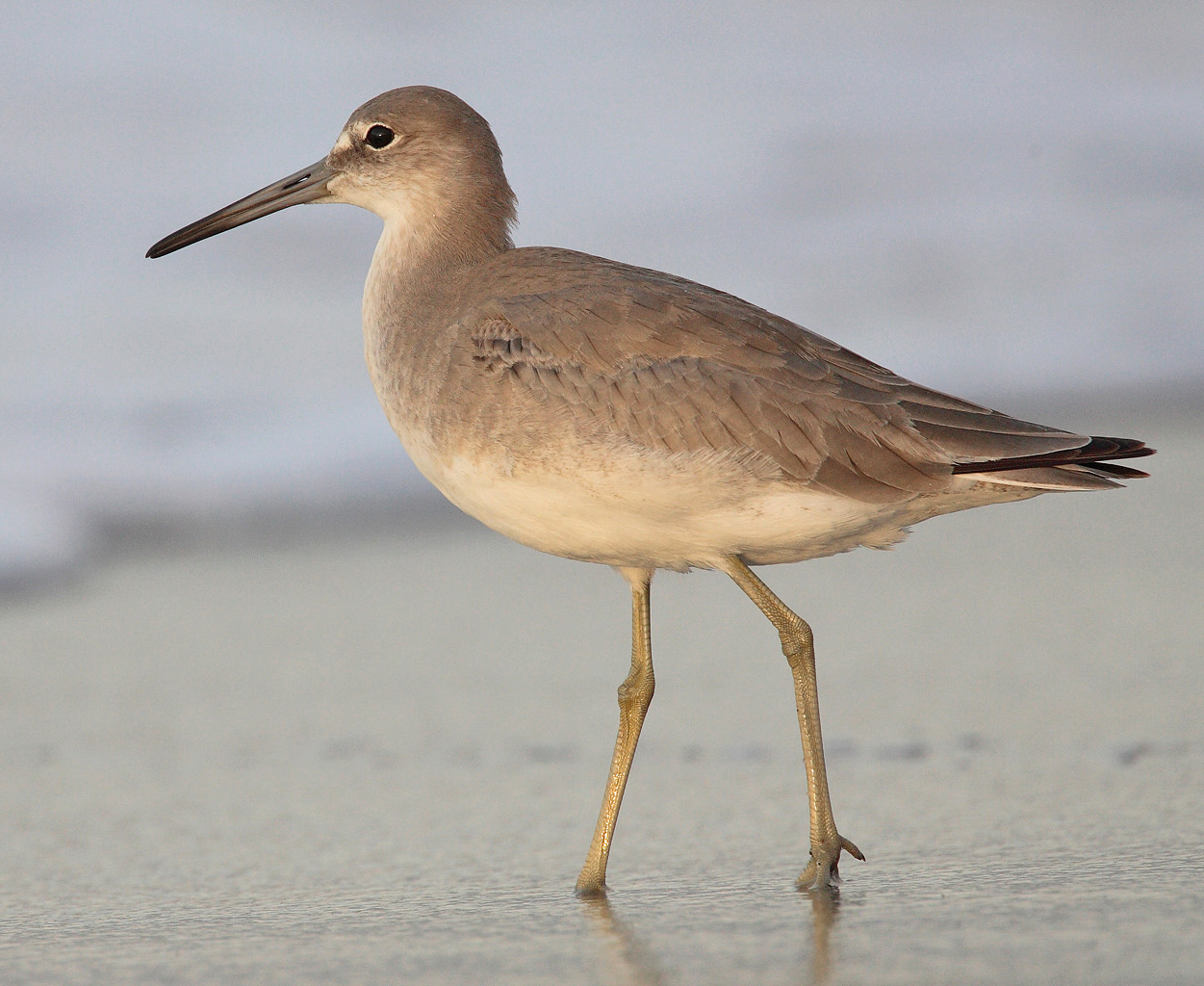
Willet
- Upland sandpiper, Bartramia longicauda (All)
- Eskimo curlew, Numenius borealis (extinct)
- Whimbrel, Numenius phaeopus
- Long-billed curlew, Numenius americanus (V)
- Eurasian curlew, Numenius arquata (V)
- Bar-tailed godwit, Limosa lapponica (V)
- Black-tailed godwit, Limosa limosa (V)
- Hudsonian godwit, Limosa haemastica
- Marbled godwit, Limosa fedoa
- Ruddy turnstone, Arenaria interpres (All)
- Red knot, Calidris canutus
- Surfbird, Calidris virgata
- Ruff, Calidris pugnax (V)
- Sharp-tailed sandpiper, Calidris acuminata (V)
- Stilt sandpiper, Calidris himantopus
- Curlew sandpiper, Calidris ferruginea (V)
- Sanderling, Calidris alba (All)
- Dunlin, Calidris alpina (V)
- Baird's sandpiper, Calidris bairdii
- Little stint, Calidris minuta (V)
- Least sandpiper, Calidris minutilla
- White-rumped sandpiper, Calidris fuscicollis (All)
- Buff-breasted sandpiper, Calidris subruficollis
- Pectoral sandpiper, Calidris melanotos (All)
- Semipalmated sandpiper, Calidris pusilla
- Western sandpiper, Calidris mauri
- Short-billed dowitcher, Limnodromus griseus
- Long-billed dowitcher, Limnodromus scolopaceus (V)
- Imperial snipe, Gallinago imperialis (E-SA)
- Jameson's snipe, Gallinago jamesoni (E-SA)
- Fuegian snipe, Gallinago stricklandii (E-SA)
- Noble snipe, Gallinago nobilis (E-SA)
- Giant snipe, Gallinago undulata (E-SA)
- Wilson's snipe, Gallinago delicata
- Pantanal snipe, Gallinago paraguaiae (E-SA)
- Magellanic snipe, Gallinago magellanica (E-SA)
- Puna snipe, Gallinago andina (E-SA)
- Wilson's phalarope, Phalaropus tricolor
- Red-necked phalarope, Phalaropus lobatus
- Red phalarope, Phalaropus fulicarius
- Terek sandpiper, Xenus cinereus (V)
- Spotted sandpiper, Actitis macularius
- Solitary sandpiper, Tringa solitaria
- Wandering tattler, Tringa incana
- Common greenshank, Tringa nebularia (V)
- Greater yellowlegs, Tringa melanoleuca (All)
- Willet, Tringa semipalmata
- Lesser yellowlegs, Tringa flavipes (All)
- Spotted redshank, Tringa erythropus (V)
- Common redshank, Tringa totanus (V)
- Wood sandpiper, Tringa glareola (V)

== Seedsnipes ==
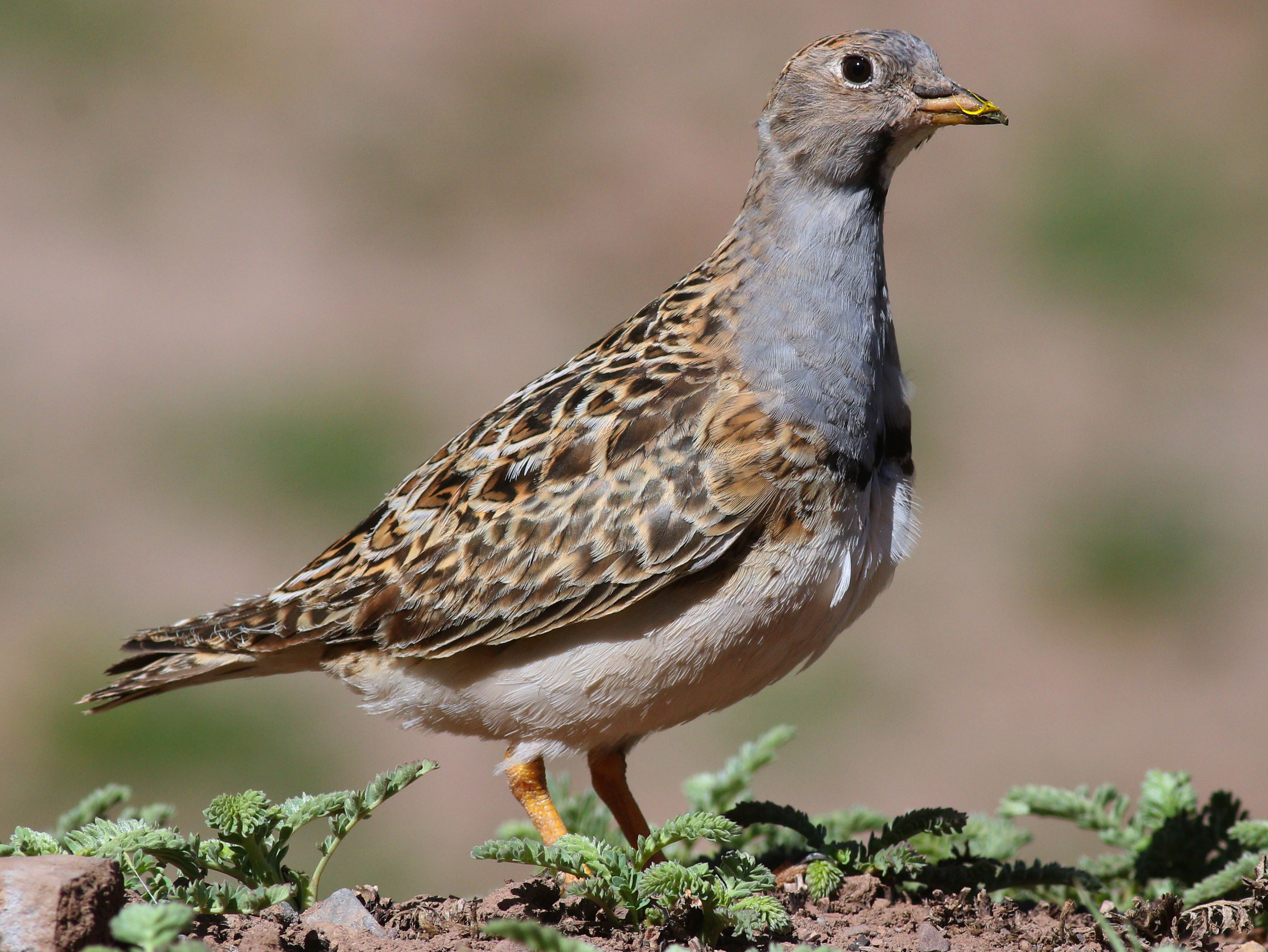
Gray-breasted seedsnipe

Order: Charadriiformes Family: Thinocoridae

The seedsnipes are a small family of birds that superficially resemble sparrows. They have short legs and long wings and are herbivorous waders.

- Rufous-bellied seedsnipe, Attagis gayi (E-SA)
- White-bellied seedsnipe, Attagis malouinus (E-SA)
- Gray-breasted seedsnipe, Thinocorus orbignyianus (E-SA)
- Least seedsnipe, Thinocorus rumicivorus (E-SA)

== Jacanas ==
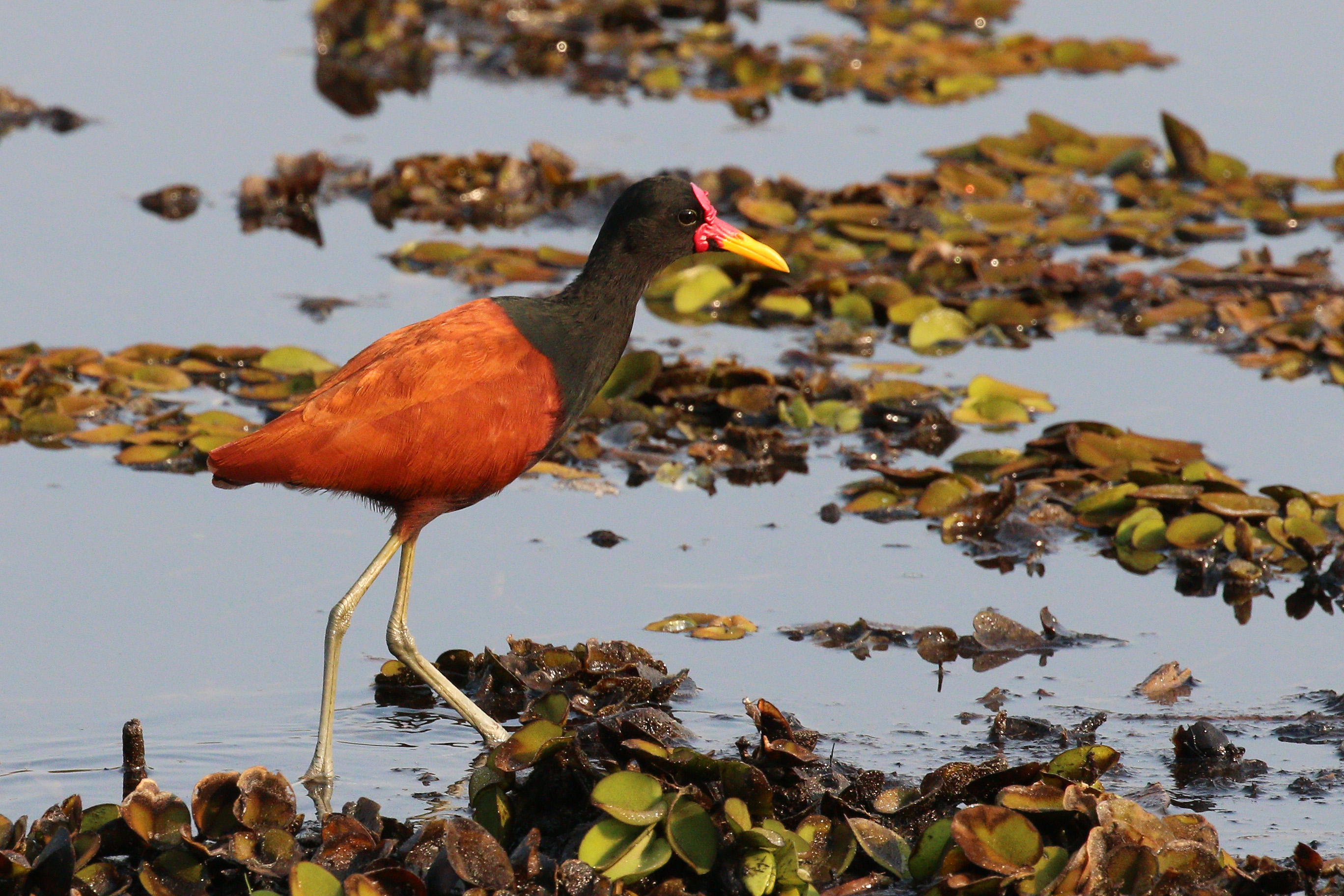
Wattled jacana

Order: Charadriiformes Family: Jacanidae

The jacanas are a family of waders found throughout the tropics. They are identifiable by their huge feet and claws which enable them to walk on floating vegetation in the shallow lakes that are their preferred habitat.

- Wattled jacana, Jacana jacana

== Painted-snipes ==
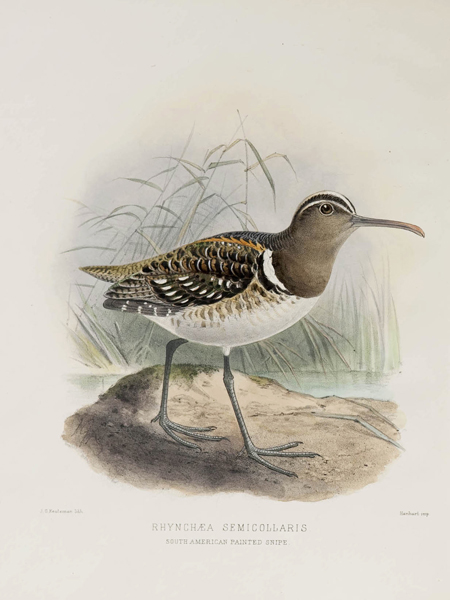
South American painted-snipe

Order: Charadriiformes Family: Rostratulidae

Painted-snipes are short-legged, long-billed birds similar in shape to the true snipes, but more brightly colored.

- South American painted-snipe, Nycticryphes semicollaris (E-SA)

== Pratincoles and coursers ==
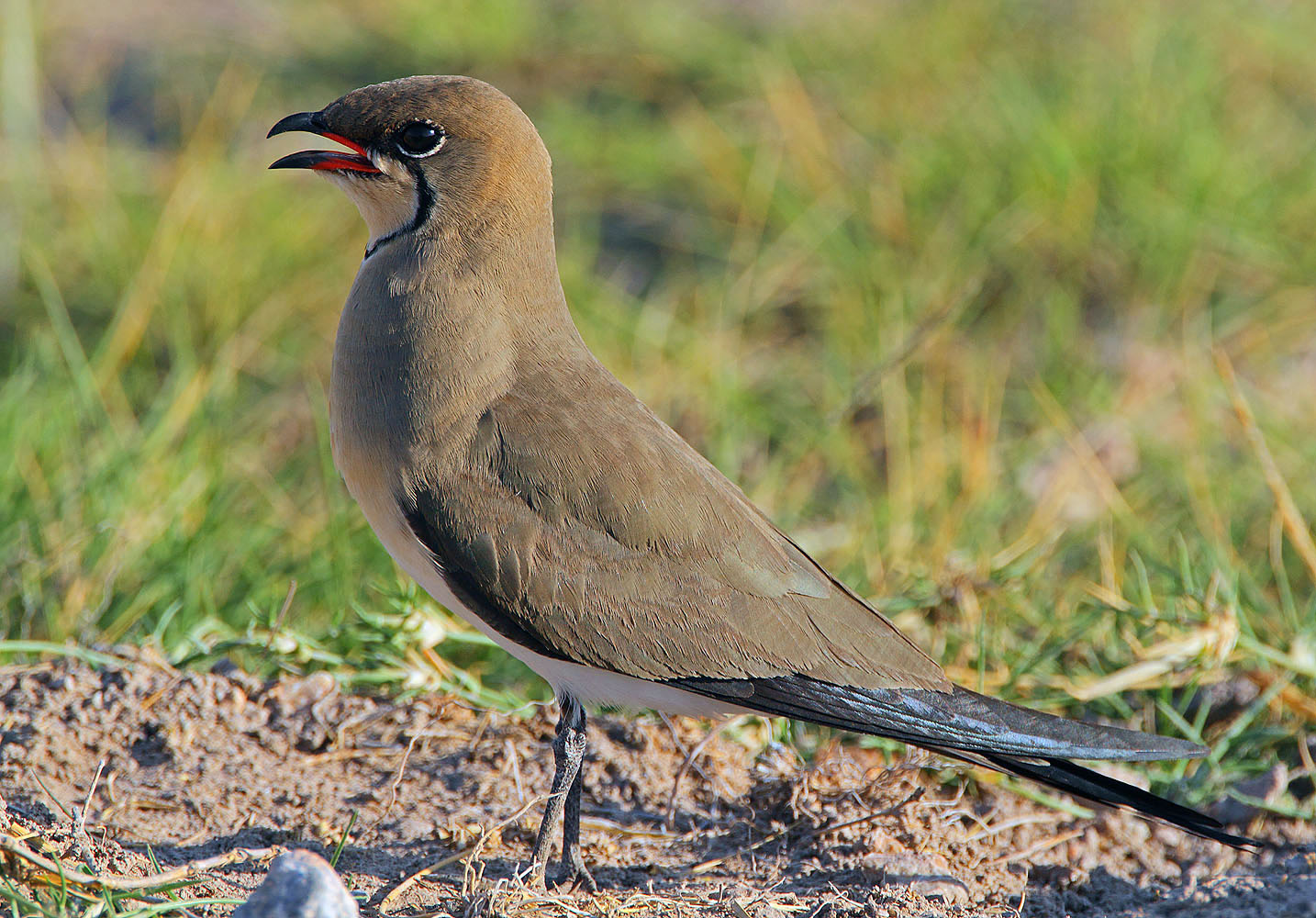
Collared pratincole

Order: Charadriiformes Family: Glareolidae

Glareolidae is a family of wading birds comprising the pratincoles, which have short legs, long pointed wings and long forked tails, and the coursers, which have long legs, short wings and long, pointed bills which curve downwards.

- Collared pratincole, Glareola pratincola (V)

== Skuas ==
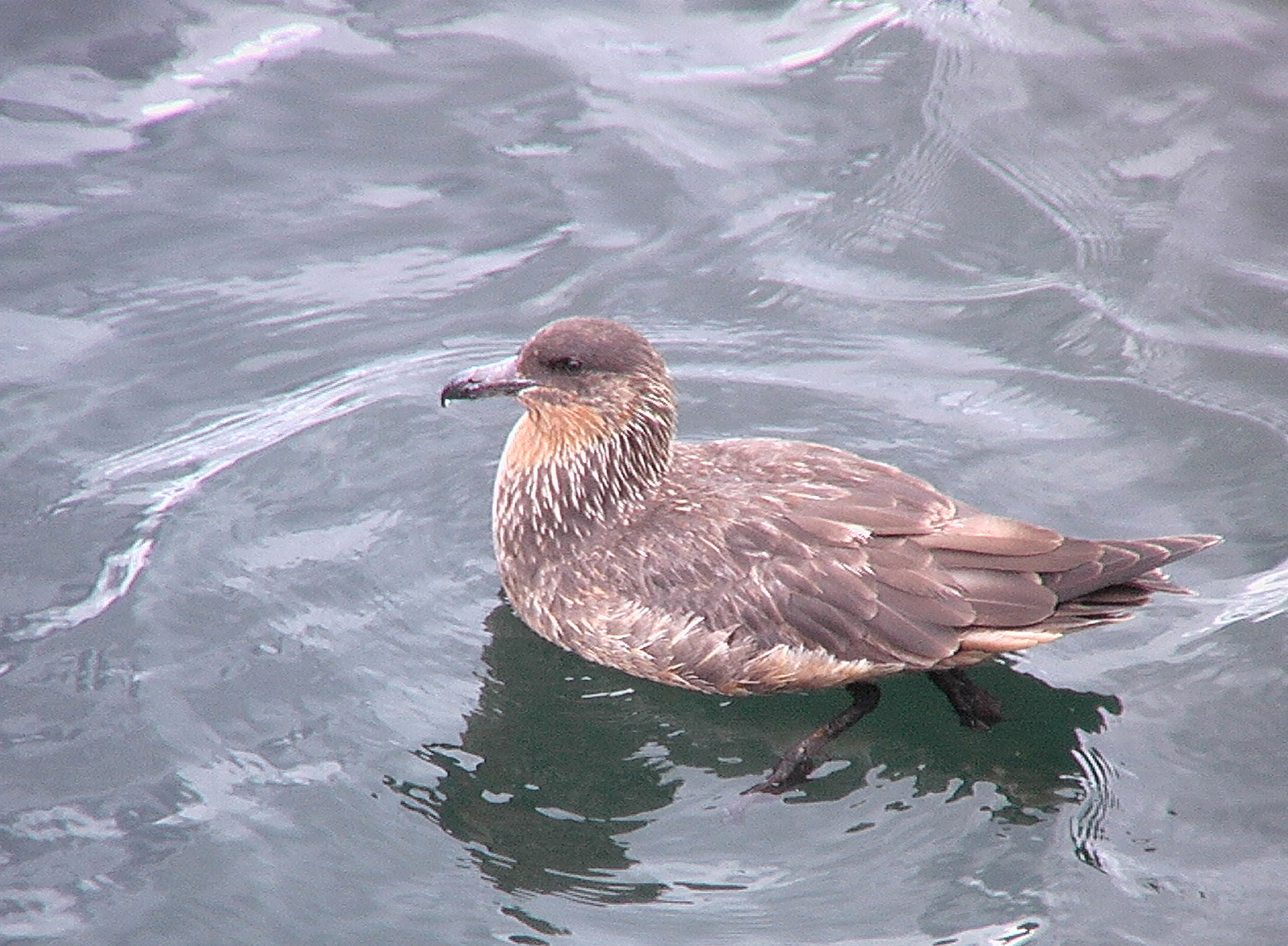
Chilean skua

Order: Charadriiformes Family: Stercorariidae

The birds of the family Stercorariidae are, in general, medium to large birds, typically with gray or brown plumage, often with white markings on the wings. They nest on the ground in temperate and arctic regions and are long-distance migrants.

- Great skua, Stercorarius skua (V)
- Chilean skua, Stercorarius chilensis (E-SA)
- South polar skua, Stercorarius maccormicki
- Brown skua, Stercorarius antarcticus
- Pomarine jaeger, Stercorarius pomarinus
- Parasitic jaeger, Stercorarius parasiticus
- Long-tailed jaeger, Stercorarius longicaudus

== Skimmers ==
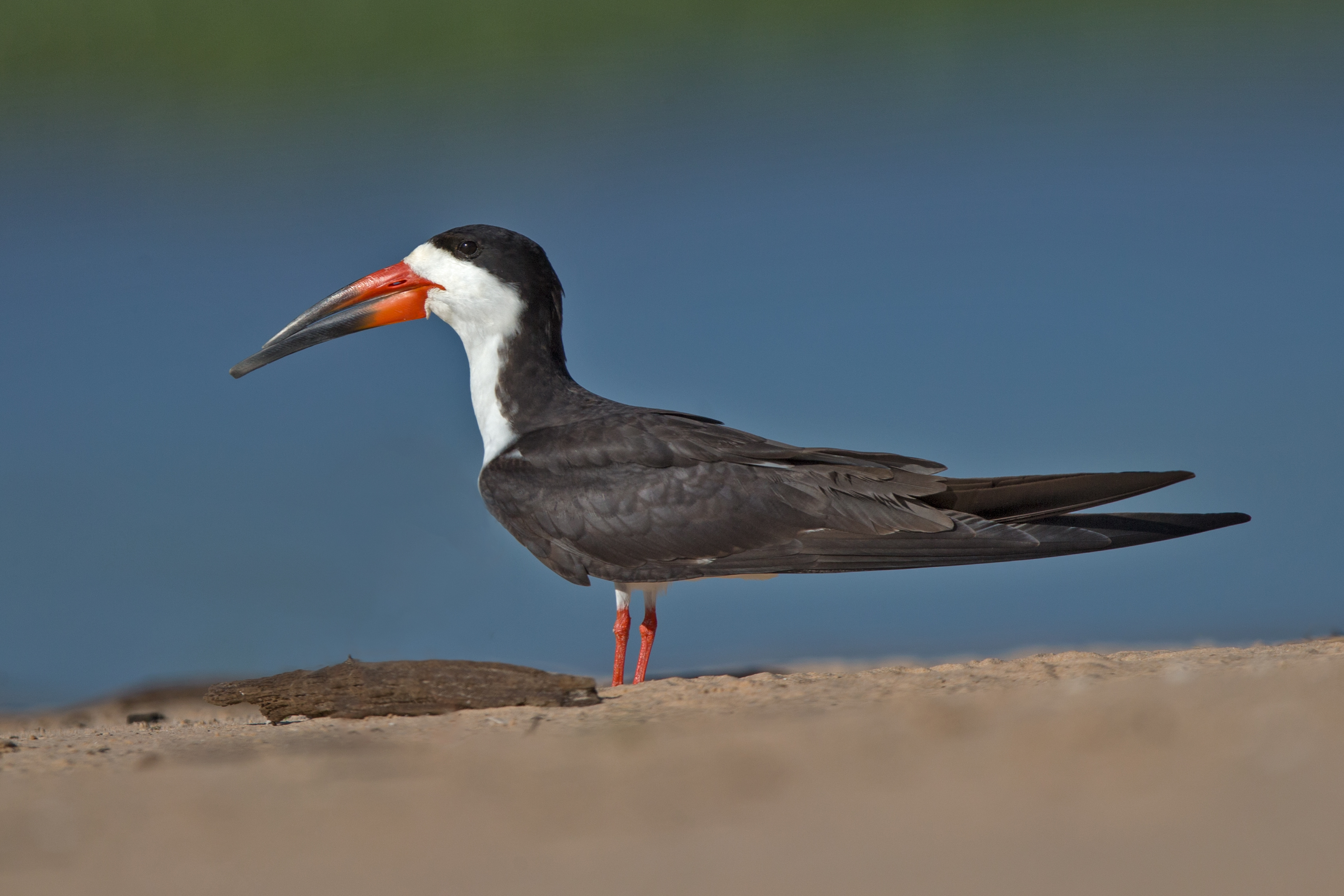
Black skimmer

Order: Charadriiformes Family: Rynchopidae

Skimmers are a small family of tropical tern-like birds. They have an elongated lower mandible which they use to feed by flying low over the water surface and skimming the water for small fish.

- Black skimmer, Rynchops niger

== Gulls ==
Order: Charadriiformes Family: Laridae

Laridae is a family of medium to large seabirds and includes gulls and terns. Gulls are typically gray or white, often with black markings on the head or wings. They have longish bills and webbed feet. Terns are a group of generally medium to large seabirds typically with gray or white plumage, often with black markings on the head. Most terns hunt fish by diving but some pick insects off the surface of fresh water. Terns are generally long-lived birds, with several species known to live in excess of 30 years.

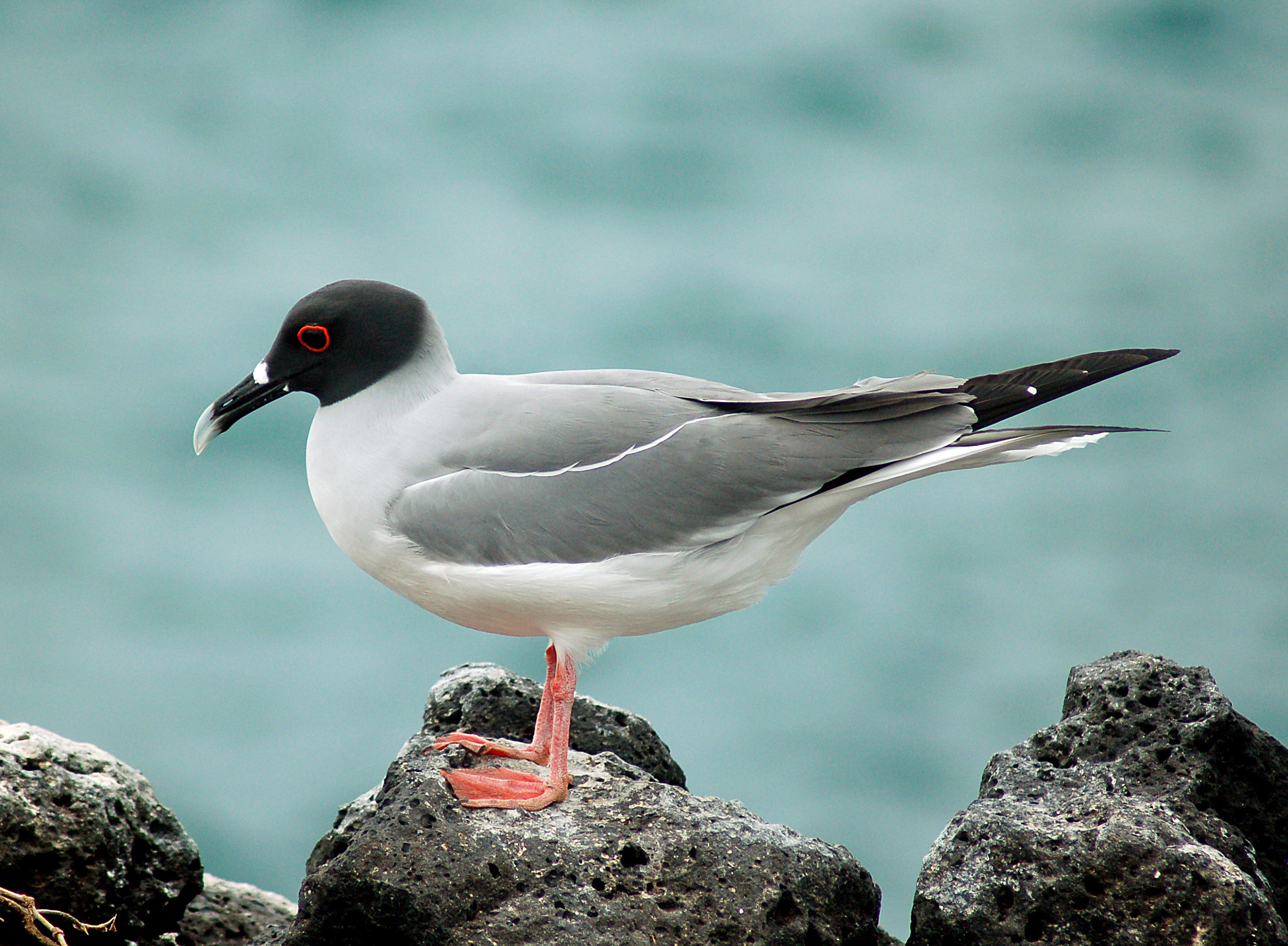
Swallow-tailed gull

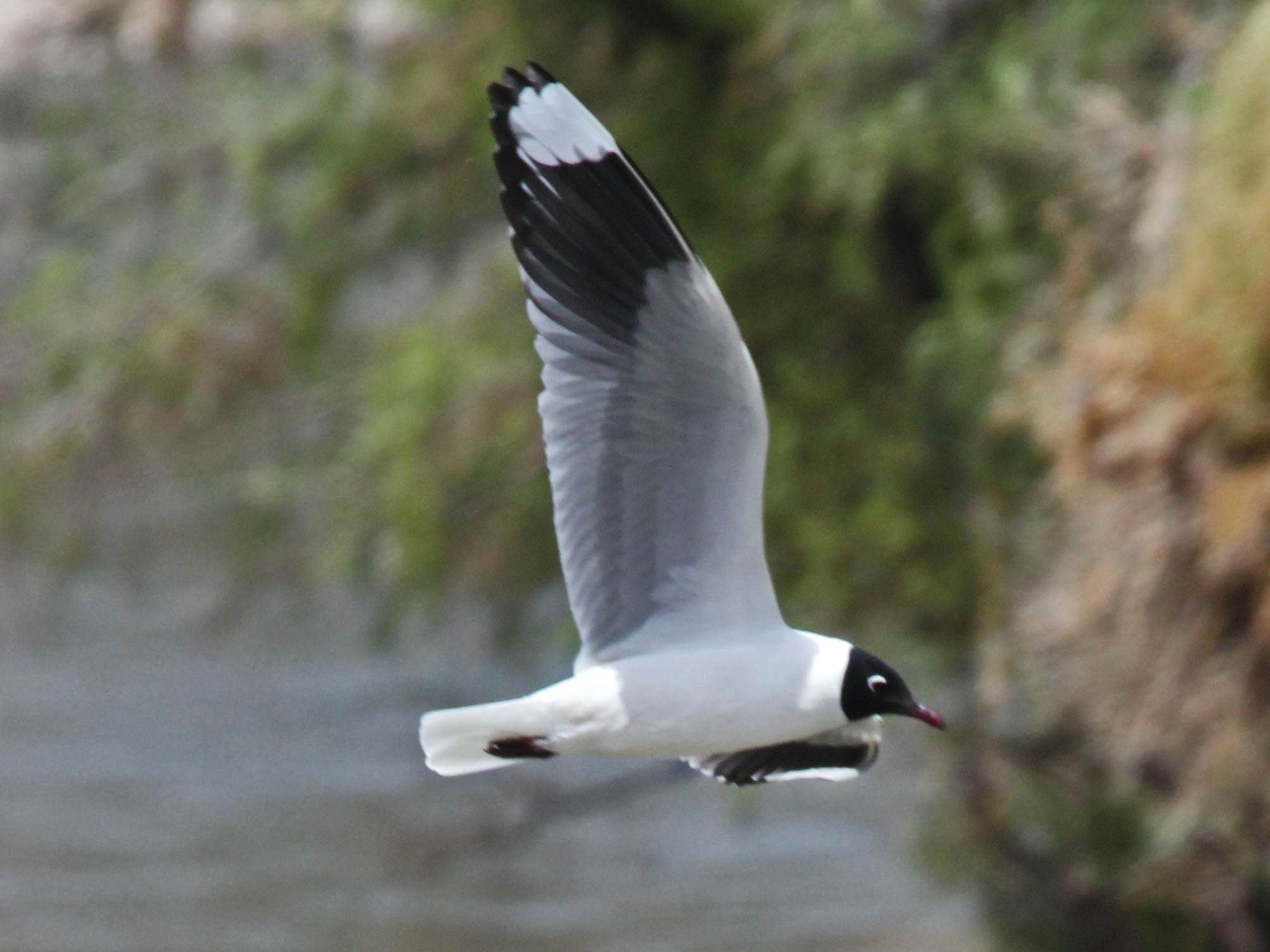
Andean gull

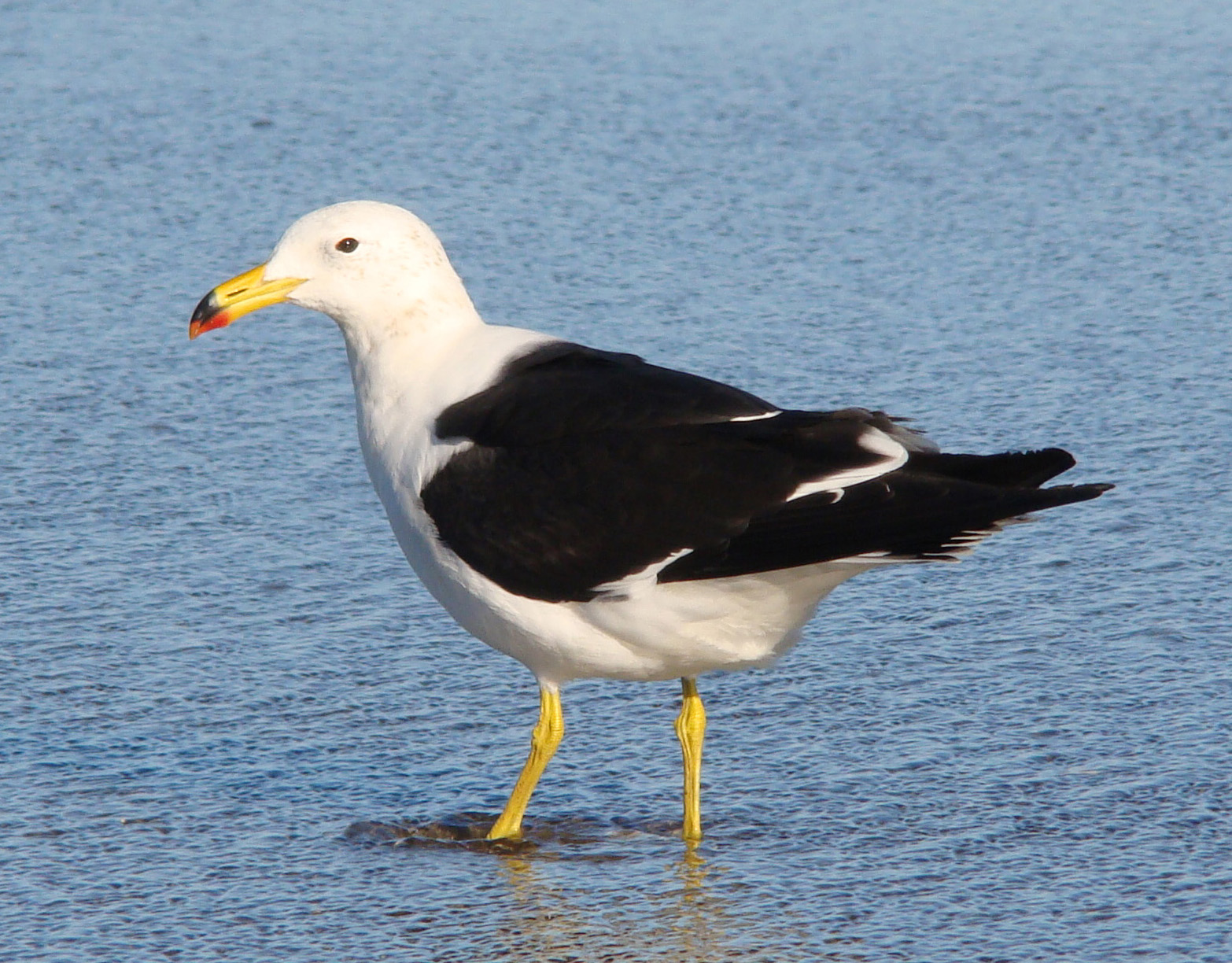
Olrog's gull

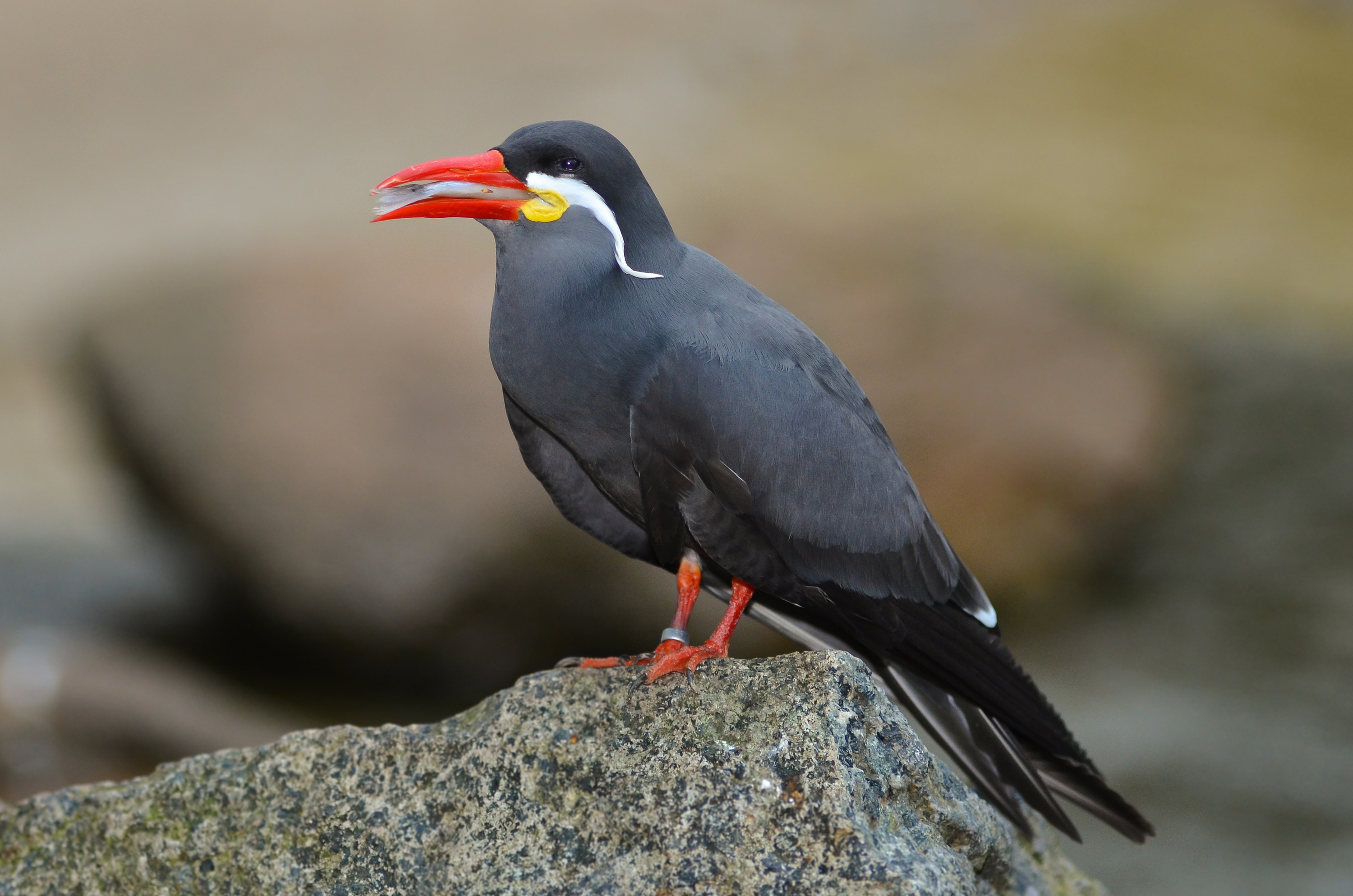
Inca tern

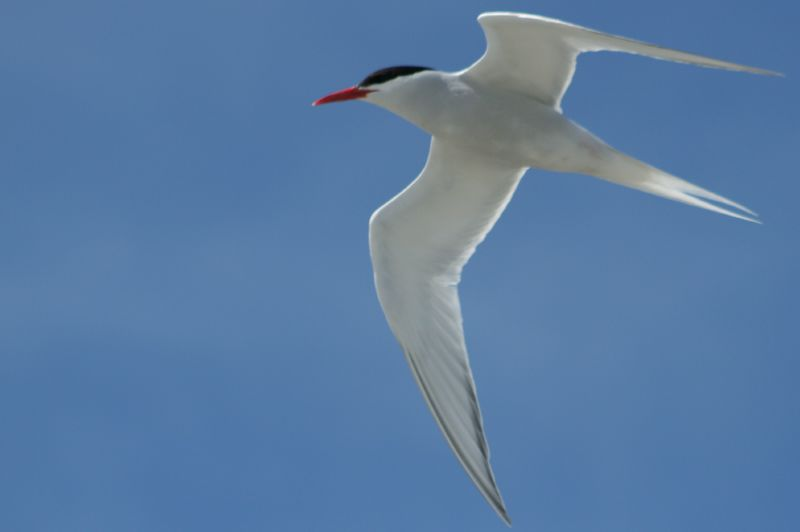
South American tern
- Swallow-tailed gull, Creagrus furcatus (E-SA)
- Black-legged kittiwake, Rissa tridactyla (V)
- Sabine's gull, Xema sabini
- Bonaparte's gull, Chroicocephalus philadelphia (V)
- Andean gull, Chroicocephalus serranus (E-SA)
- Brown-hooded gull, Chroicocephalus maculipennis (E-SA)
- Gray-hooded gull, Chroicocephalus cirrocephalus
- Black-headed gull, Chroicocephalus ridibundus (V)
- Little gull, Hydrocoloeus minutus (V)
- Dolphin gull, Leucophaeus scoresbii (E-SA)
- Gray gull, Leucophaeus modestus
- Laughing gull, Leucophaeus atricilla
- Franklin's gull, Leucophaeus pipixcan
- Lava gull, Leucophaeus fuliginosus (E-GA)
- Audouin's gull, Ichthyaetus auduoinii (V)
- Belcher's gull, Larus belcheri (E-SA)
- Olrog's gull, Larus atlanticus (E-SA)
- Ring-billed gull, Larus delawarensis (V)
- California gull, Larus californicus (V)
- Great black-backed gull, Larus marinus (V)
- Kelp gull, Larus dominicanus
- Lesser black-backed gull, Larus fuscus (V)
- Herring gull, Larus argentatus
- Brown noddy, Anous stolidus
- Black noddy, Anous minutus
- Gray noddy, Anous albivitta
- Atlantic white-tern, Gygis alba
- Blue-billed white-tern, Gygis candida
- Sooty tern, Onychoprion fuscatus
- Bridled tern, Onychoprion anaethetus
- Least tern, Sternula antillarum
- Yellow-billed tern, Sternula superciliaris (E-SA)
- Peruvian tern, Sternula lorata (E-SA)
- Large-billed tern, Phaetusa simplex (E-SA)
- Gull-billed tern, Gelochelidon nilotica
- Caspian tern, Hydroprogne caspia
- Inca tern, Larosterna inca (E-SA)
- Whiskered tern, Chlidonias hybrida (V)
- Black tern, Chlidonias niger
- White-winged tern, Chlidonias leucopterus (V)
- Common tern, Sterna hirundo (All)
- Roseate tern, Sterna dougallii
- Arctic tern, Sterna paradisaea
- South American tern, Sterna hirundinacea (E-SA)
- Antarctic tern, Sterna vittata
- Forster's tern, Sterna forsteri (V)
- Snowy-crowned tern, Sterna trudeaui
- Elegant tern, Thalasseus elegans
- Sandwich tern, Thalasseus sandvicensis
- Royal tern, Thalasseus maximus

== Sunbittern ==
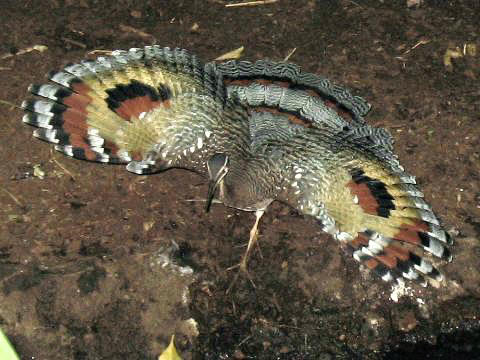
Sunbittern

Order: Eurypygiformes Family: Eurypygidae

The sunbittern is a bittern-like bird of tropical regions of the Americas and the sole member of the family Eurypygidae (sometimes spelled Eurypigidae) and genus Eurypyga.

- Sunbittern, Eurypyga helias

== Tropicbirds ==
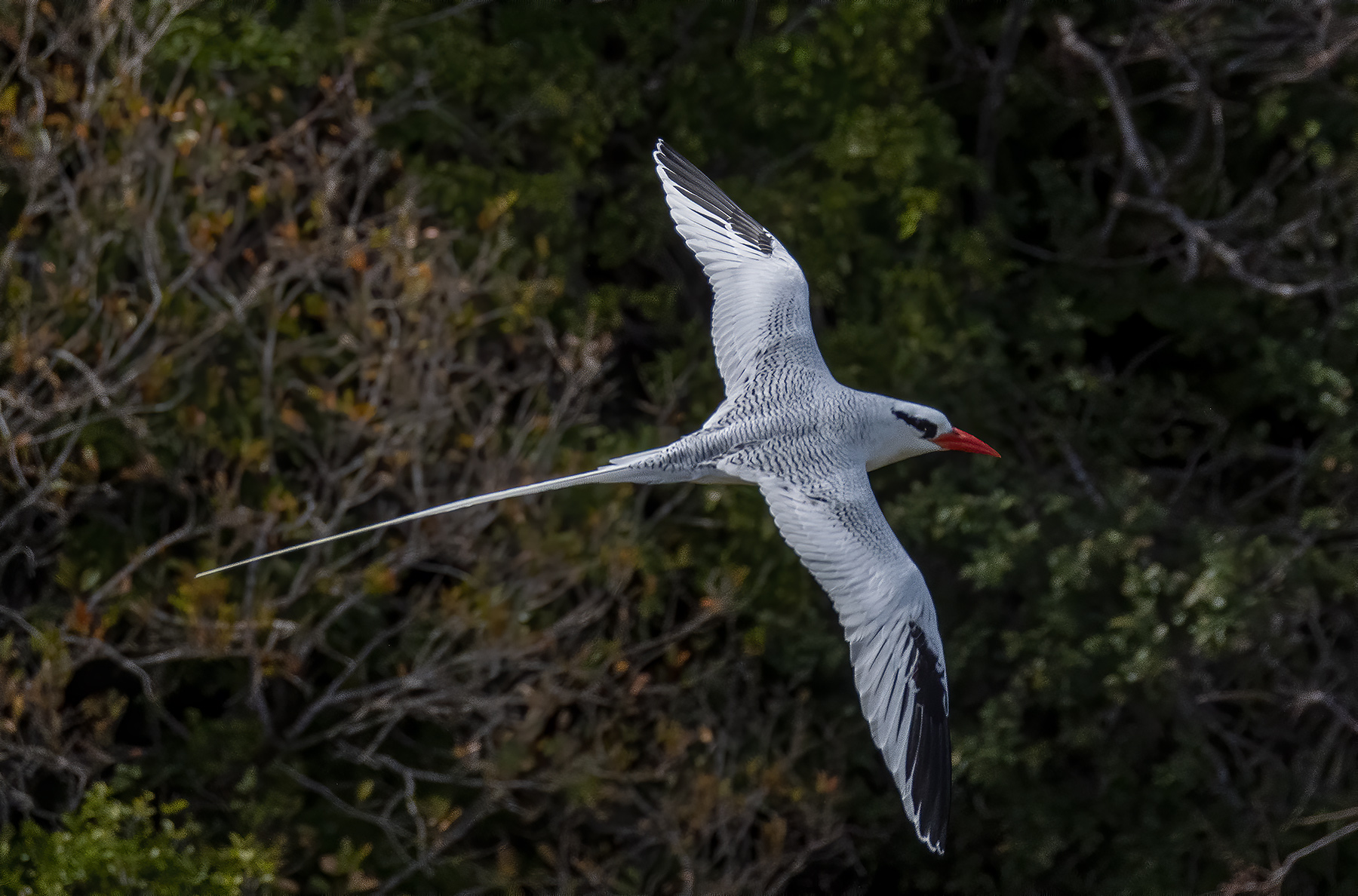
Red-billed tropicbird

Order: Phaethontiformes Family: Phaethontidae

Tropicbirds are slender white birds of tropical oceans, with exceptionally long central tail feathers. Their heads and long wings have black markings.

- Red-billed tropicbird, Phaethon aethereus
- Red-tailed tropicbird, Phaethon rubricauda (V)
- White-tailed tropicbird, Phaethon lepturus

== Penguins ==
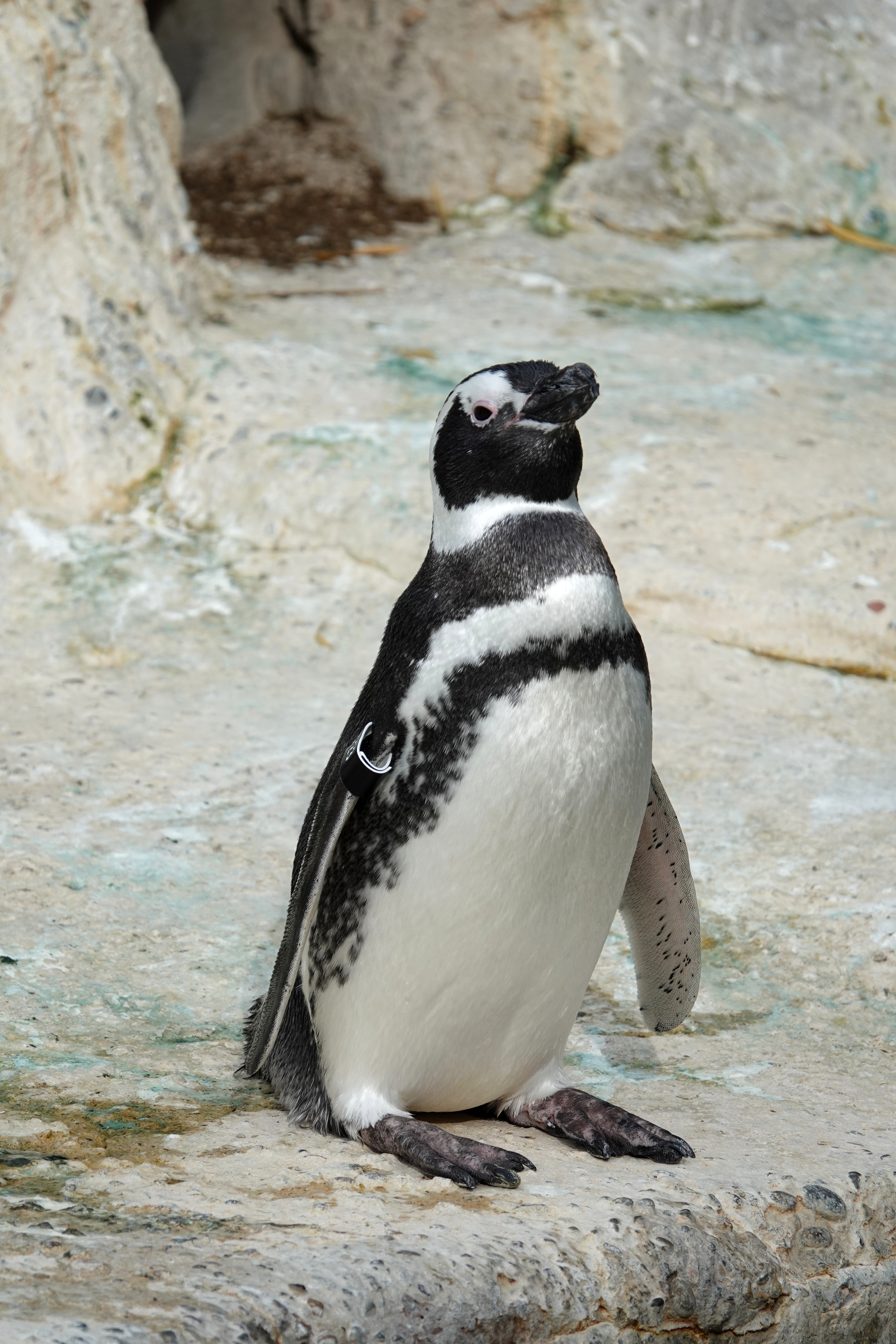
Magellanic penguin

Order: Sphenisciformes Family: Spheniscidae

The penguins are a group of aquatic, flightless birds living almost exclusively in the Southern Hemisphere. Most penguins feed on krill, fish, squid, and other forms of sealife caught while swimming underwater.

- King penguin, Aptenodytes patagonicus
- Emperor penguin, Aptenodytes forsteri (V)
- Gentoo penguin, Pygoscelis papua
- Adelie penguin, Pygoscelis adeliae (V)
- Chinstrap penguin, Pygoscelis antarcticus
- Little penguin, Eudyptula minor (V)
- Humboldt penguin, Spheniscus humboldti (E-SA)
- Galapagos penguin, Spheniscus mendiculus
- Magellanic penguin, Spheniscus magellanicus (E-SA)
- Erect-crested penguin, Eudyptes sclateri (V)
- Macaroni penguin, Eudyptes chrysolophus
- Tristan penguin, Eudyptes moseleyi (V)
- Rockhopper penguin, Eudyptes chrysocome
- Snares penguin, Eudyptes robustus (V)

== Albatrosses ==
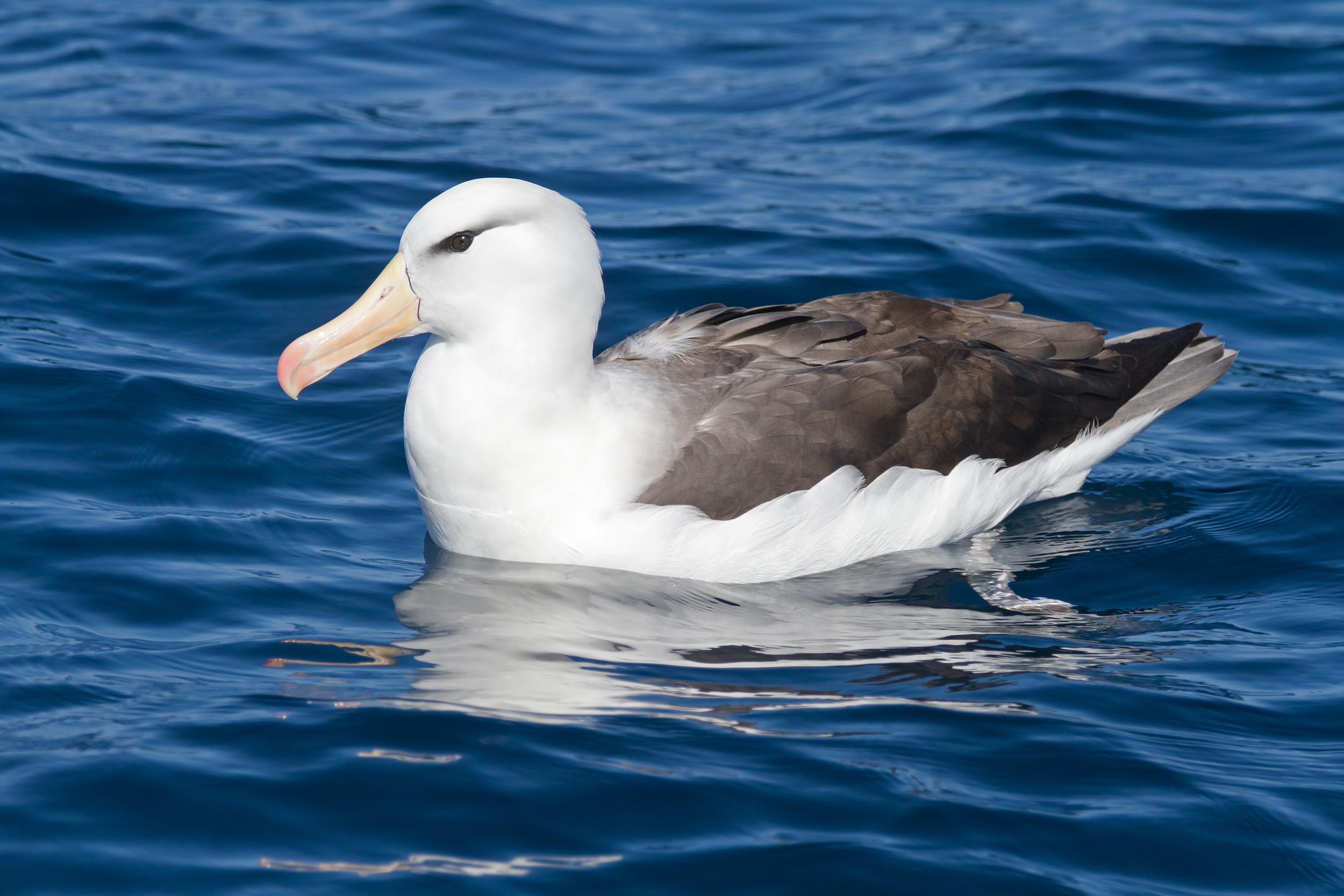
Black-browed albatross

Order: Procellariiformes Family: Diomedeidae

Albatrosses are among the largest of flying birds, and the great albatrosses from the genus Diomedea have the largest wingspans of any extant birds.

- Waved albatross, Phoebastria irrorata
- Royal albatross, Diomedea epomophora
- Wandering albatross, Diomedea exulans
- Sooty albatross, Phoebetria fusca (V)
- Light-mantled albatross, Phoebetria palpebrata
- Yellow-nosed albatross, Thalassarche chlororhynchos
- Black-browed albatross, Thalassarche melanophris
- Gray-headed albatross, Thalassarche chrysostoma
- Buller's albatross, Thalassarche bulleri
- White-capped albatross, Thalassarche cauta
- Salvin's albatross, Thalassarche salvini
- Chatham albatross, Thalassarche eremita

== Southern storm-petrels ==
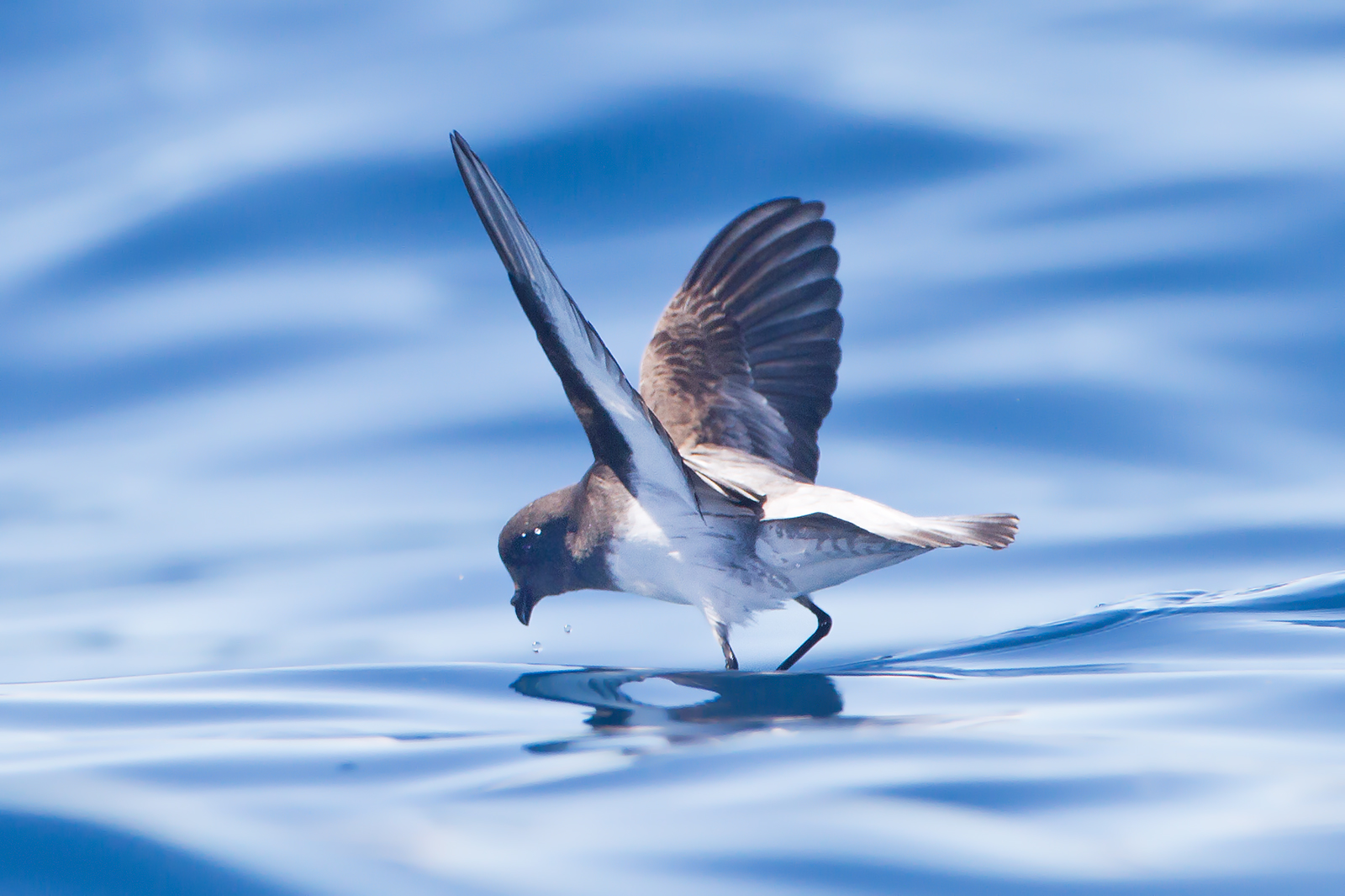
Gray-backed storm-petrel

Order: Procellariiformes Family: Oceanitidae

The storm-petrels are the smallest seabirds, relatives of the petrels, feeding on planktonic crustaceans and small fish picked from the surface, typically while hovering. The flight is fluttering and sometimes bat-like. Until 2018, this family's species were included with the other storm-petrels in family Hydrobatidae.

- White-bellied storm-petrel, Fregetta grallaria
- Black-bellied storm-petrel, Fregetta tropica
- Wilson's storm-petrel, Oceanites oceanicus
- Pincoya storm-petrel, Oceanites pincoyae (E-SA)
- Elliot's storm-petrel, Oceanites gracilis
- Gray-backed storm-petrel, Garrodia nereis
- White-faced storm-petrel, Pelagodroma marina

== Northern storm-petrels ==
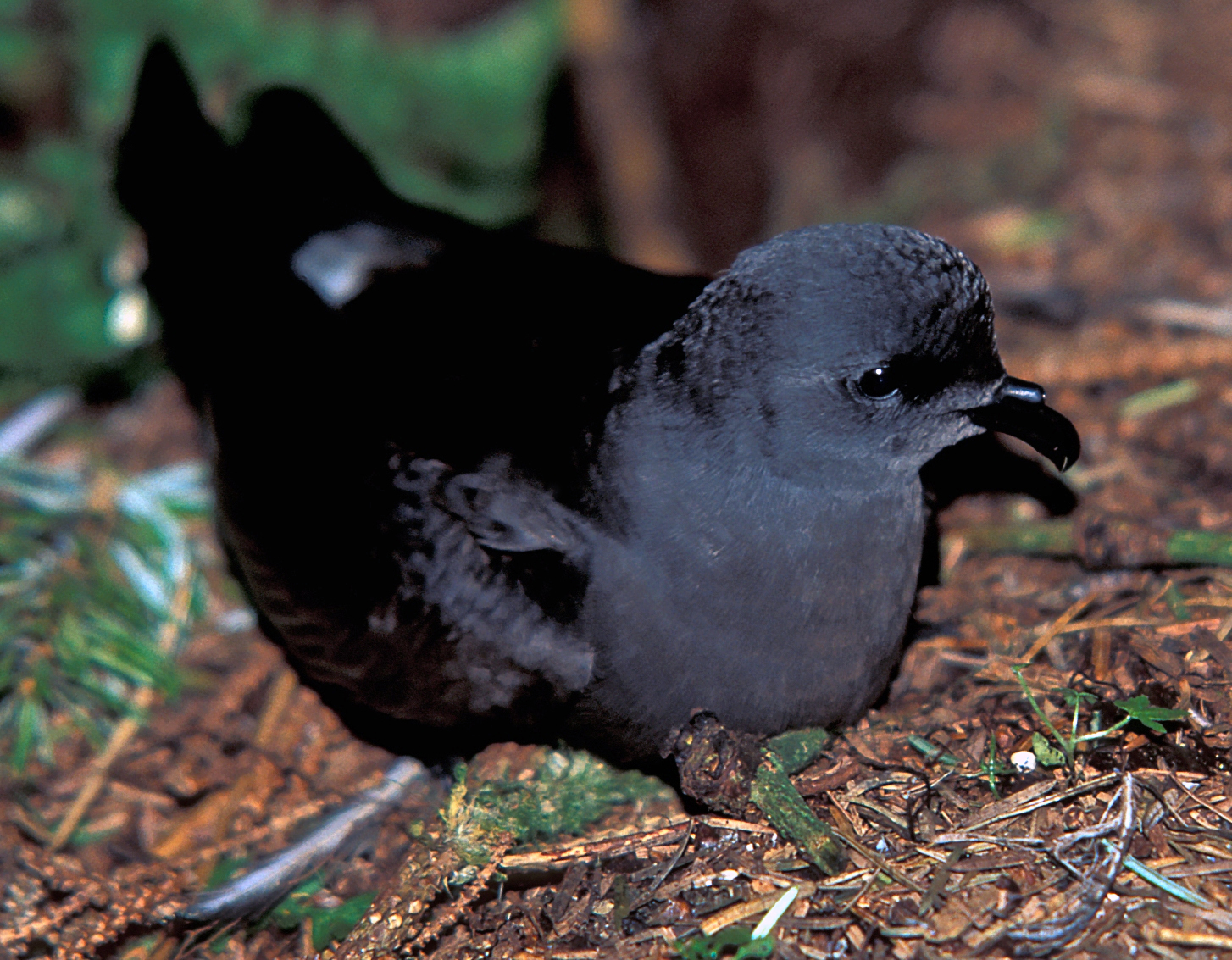
Leach's storm-petrel

Order: Procellariiformes Family: Hydrobatidae

Though the members of this family are similar in many respects to the southern storm-petrels, including their general appearance and habits, there are enough genetic differences to warrant their placement in a separate family.

- Least storm-petrel, Hydrobates microsoma
- Wedge-rumped storm-petrel, Hydrobates tethys
- Band-rumped storm-petrel, Hydrobates castro
- Leach's storm-petrel, Hydrobates leucorhous
- Markham's storm-petrel, Hydrobates markhami
- Hornby's storm-petrel, Hydrobates hornbyi
- Black storm-petrel, Hydrobates melania

== Shearwaters ==
Order: Procellariiformes Family: Procellariidae

The procellariids are the main group of medium-sized "true petrels", characterized by united nostrils with medium septum and a long outer functional primary.

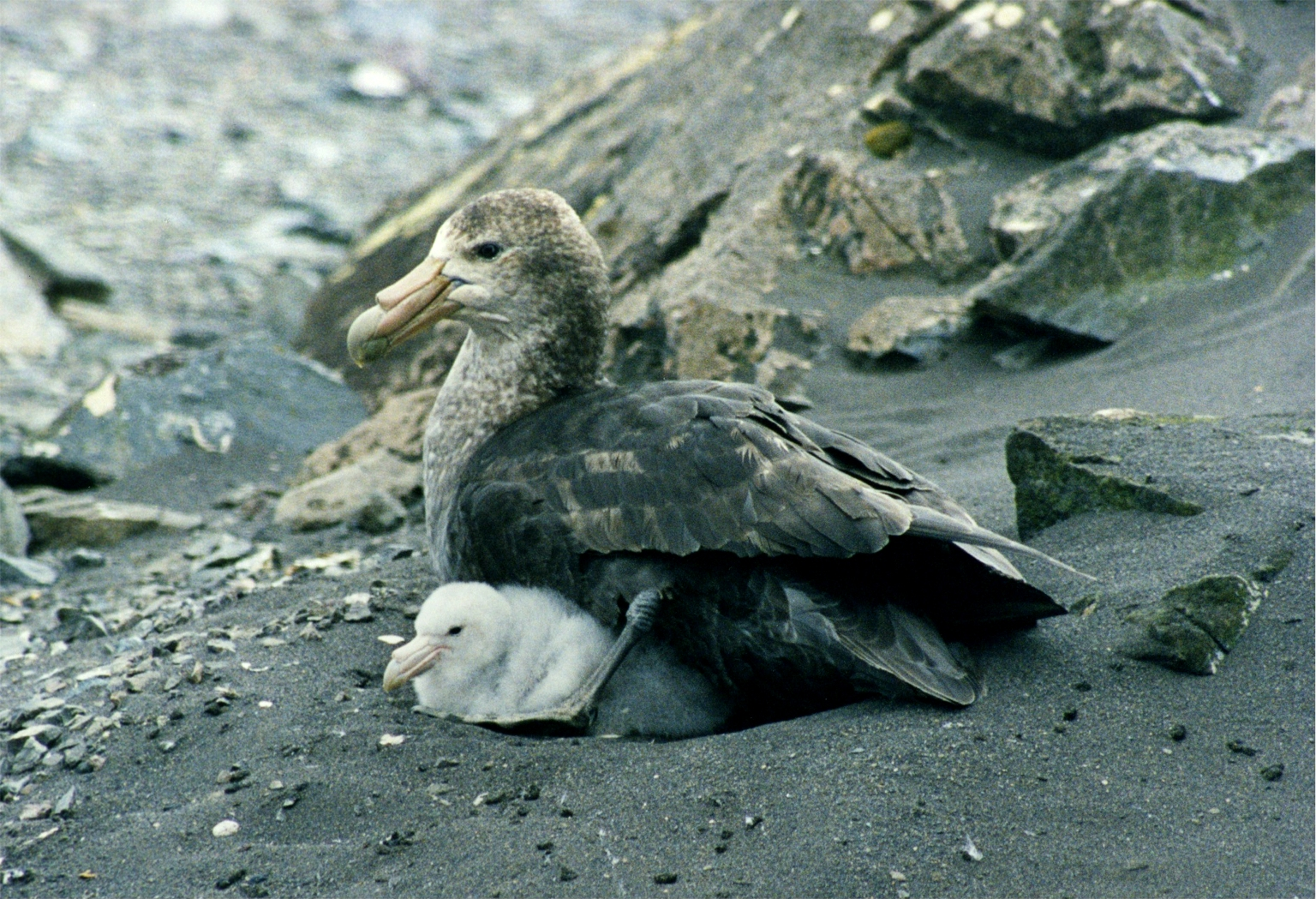
Southern giant-petrel

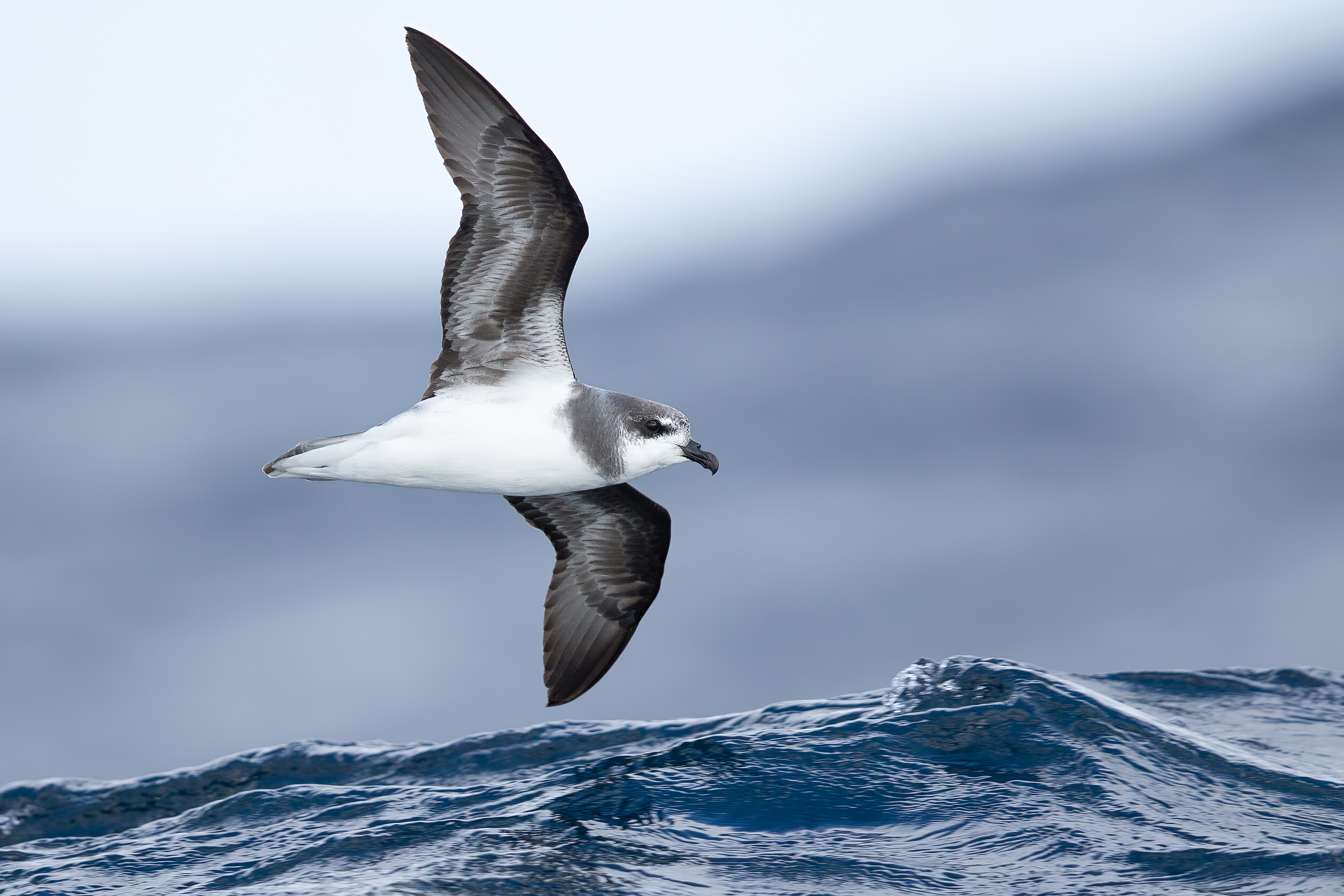
Soft-plumaged petrel

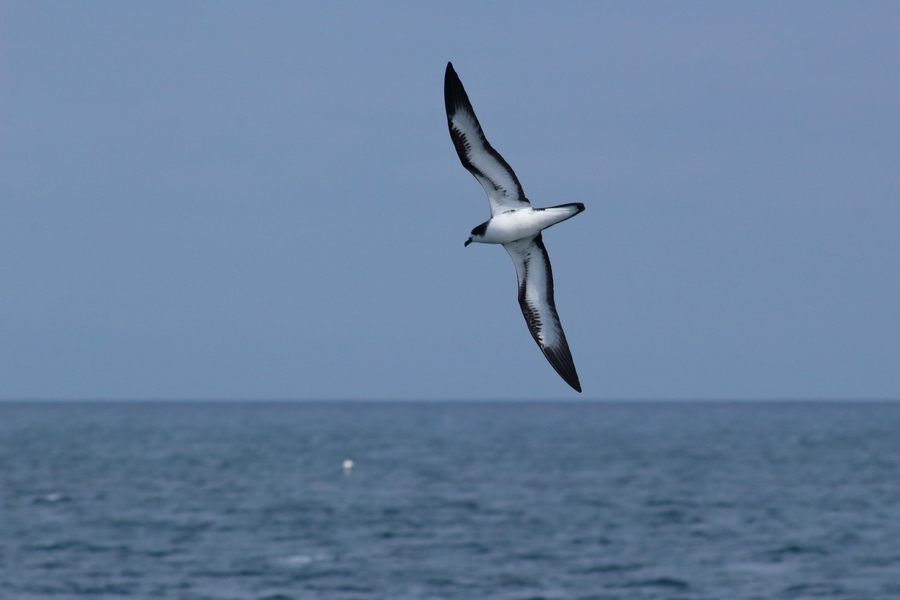
Galapagos petrel

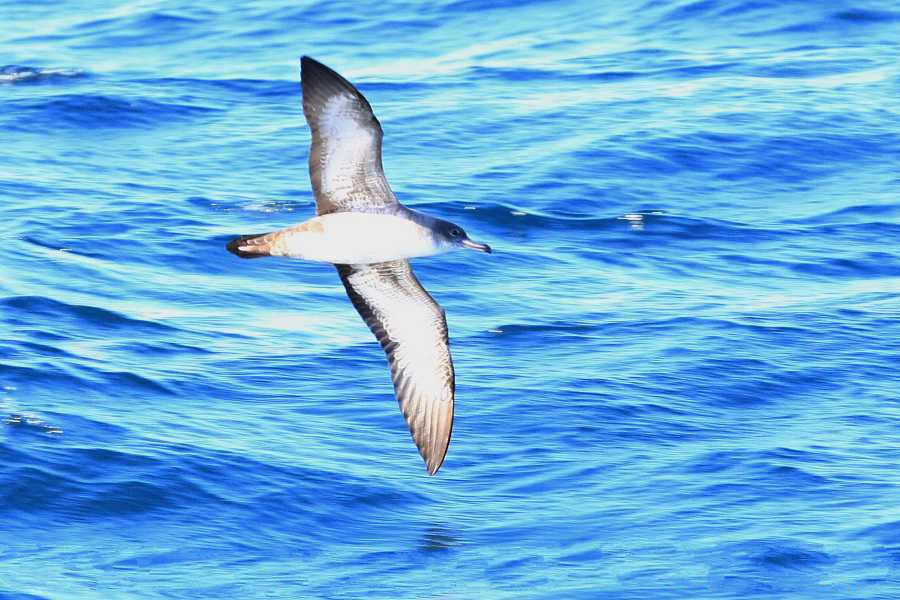
Pink-footed shearwater

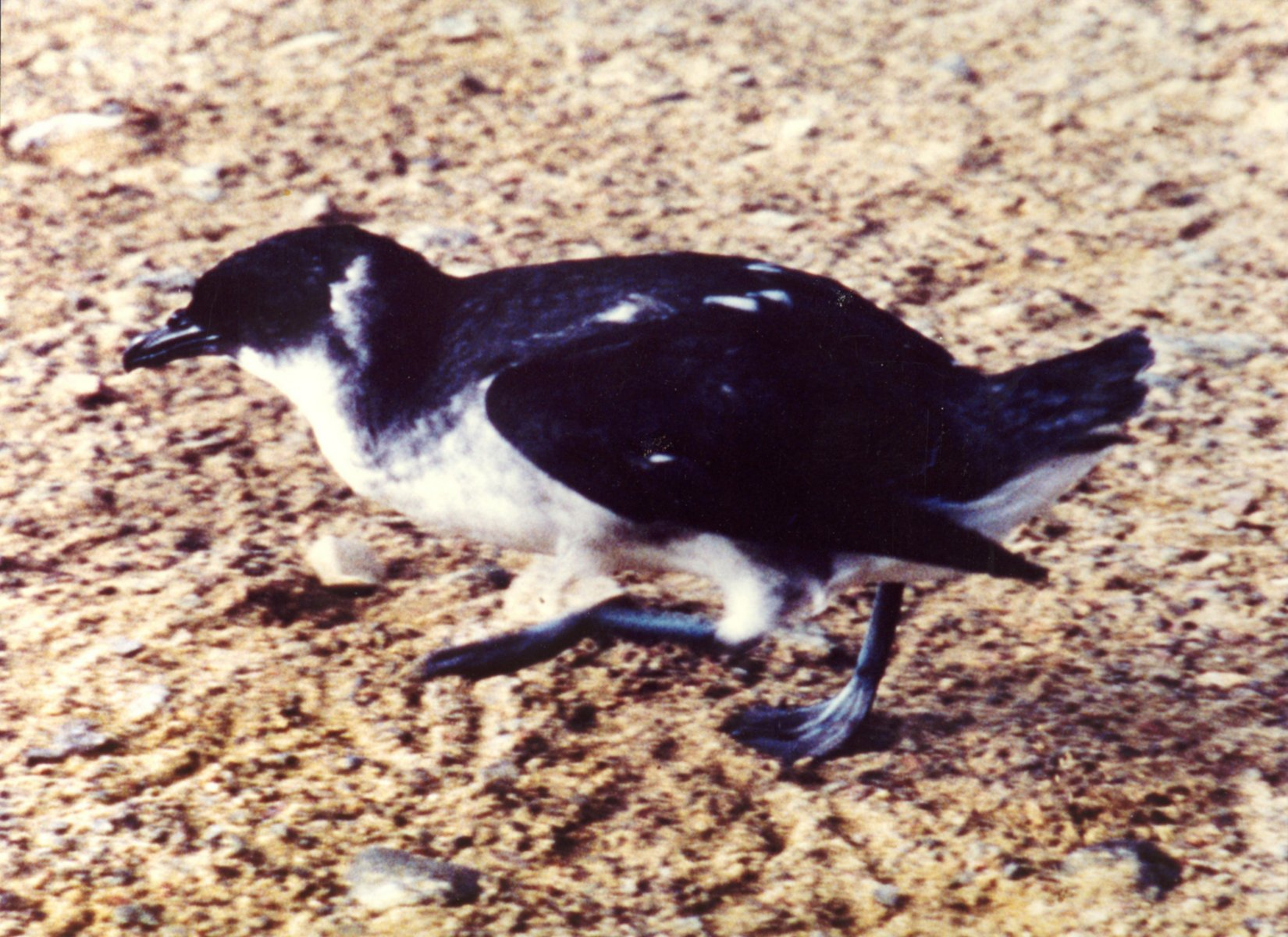
Peruvian diving-petrel
- Northern fulmar, Fulmarus glacialis (V)
- Southern giant-petrel, Macronectes giganteus
- Northern giant-petrel, Macronectes halli
- Southern fulmar, Fulmarus glacialoides
- Antarctic petrel, Thalassoica antarctica (V)
- Pintado petrel, Daption capense
- Snow petrel, Pagodroma nivea (V)
- Kerguelen petrel, Aphrodroma brevirostris
- Gould's petrel, Pterodroma leucoptera (V)
- Great-winged petrel, Pterodroma macroptera (V)
- Soft-plumaged petrel, Pterodroma mollis
- Black-capped petrel, Pterodroma hasitata
- Atlantic petrel, Pterodroma incerta
- White-headed petrel, Pterodroma lessonii
- Cook's petrel, Pterodroma cookii
- Black-winged petrel, Pterodroma nigripennis (V)
- Chatham petrel, Pterodroma axillaris (V)
- Masatierra petrel, Pterodroma defilippiana
- Stejneger's petrel, Pterodroma longirostris
- Murphy's petrel, Pterodroma ultima (V)
- Kermadec petrel, Pterodroma neglecta
- Trindade petrel, Pterodroma arminjoniana
- Mottled petrel, Pterodroma inexpectata (V)
- Galapagos petrel, Pterodroma phaeopygia
- Juan Fernandez petrel, Pterodroma externa
- Fea's petrel, Pterodroma feae
- Blue petrel, Halobaena caerulea
- Fairy prion, Pachyptila turtur
- Broad-billed prion, Pachyptila vittata (V)
- Antarctic prion, Pachyptila desolata
- Slender-billed prion, Pachyptila belcheri
- Bulwer's petrel, Bulweria bulwerii (V)
- Gray petrel, Procellaria cinerea
- White-chinned petrel, Procellaria aequinoctialis
- Spectacled petrel, Procellaria conspicillata
- Parkinson's petrel, Procellaria parkinsoni
- Westland petrel, Procellaria westlandica
- Cory's shearwater, Calonectris diomedea
- Cape Verde shearwater, Calonectris edwardsii (V)
- Wedge-tailed shearwater, Ardenna pacifica
- Buller's shearwater, Ardenna bulleri
- Short-tailed shearwater, Ardenna tenuirostris (V)
- Sooty shearwater, Ardenna grisea
- Great shearwater, Ardenna gravis
- Pink-footed shearwater, Ardenna creatopus
- Flesh-footed shearwater, Ardenna carneipes
- Christmas shearwater, Puffinus navtitatis (V)
- Manx shearwater, Puffinus puffinus
- Galapagos shearwater, Puffinus subalaris
- Little shearwater, Puffinus assimilis
- Audubon's shearwater, Puffinus lherminieri
- Peruvian diving-petrel, Pelecanoides garnotii (E-SA)
- Common diving-petrel, Pelecanoides urinatrix
- South Georgia diving-petrel, Pelecanoides georgicus (V)
- Magellanic diving-petrel, Pelecanoides magellani (E-SA)

== Storks ==
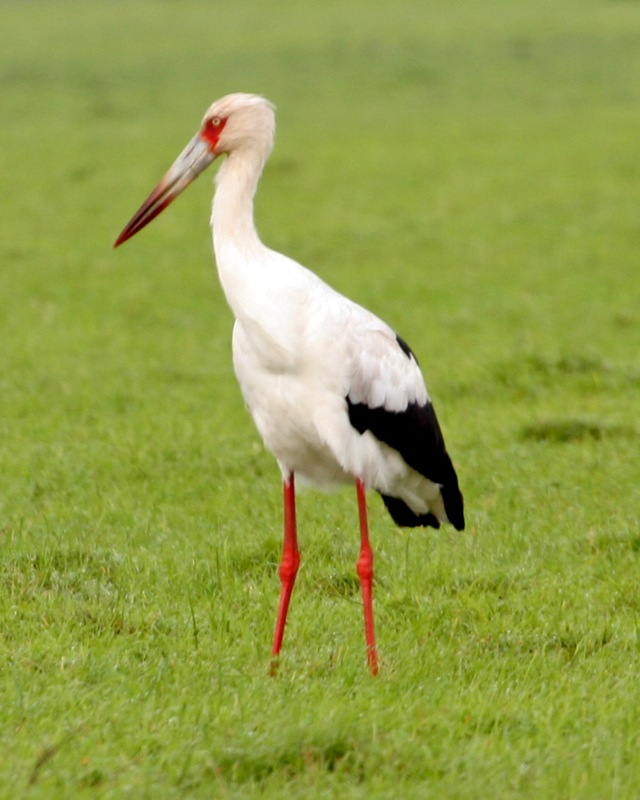
Maguari stork

Order: Ciconiiformes Family: Ciconiidae

Storks are large, long-legged, long-necked wading birds with long, stout bills. Storks are mute, but bill-clattering is an important mode of communication at the nest. Their nests can be large and may be reused for many years. Many species are migratory.

- Maguari stork, Ciconia maguari (E-SA)
- Jabiru, Jabiru mycteria
- Wood stork, Mycteria americana

== Frigatebirds ==
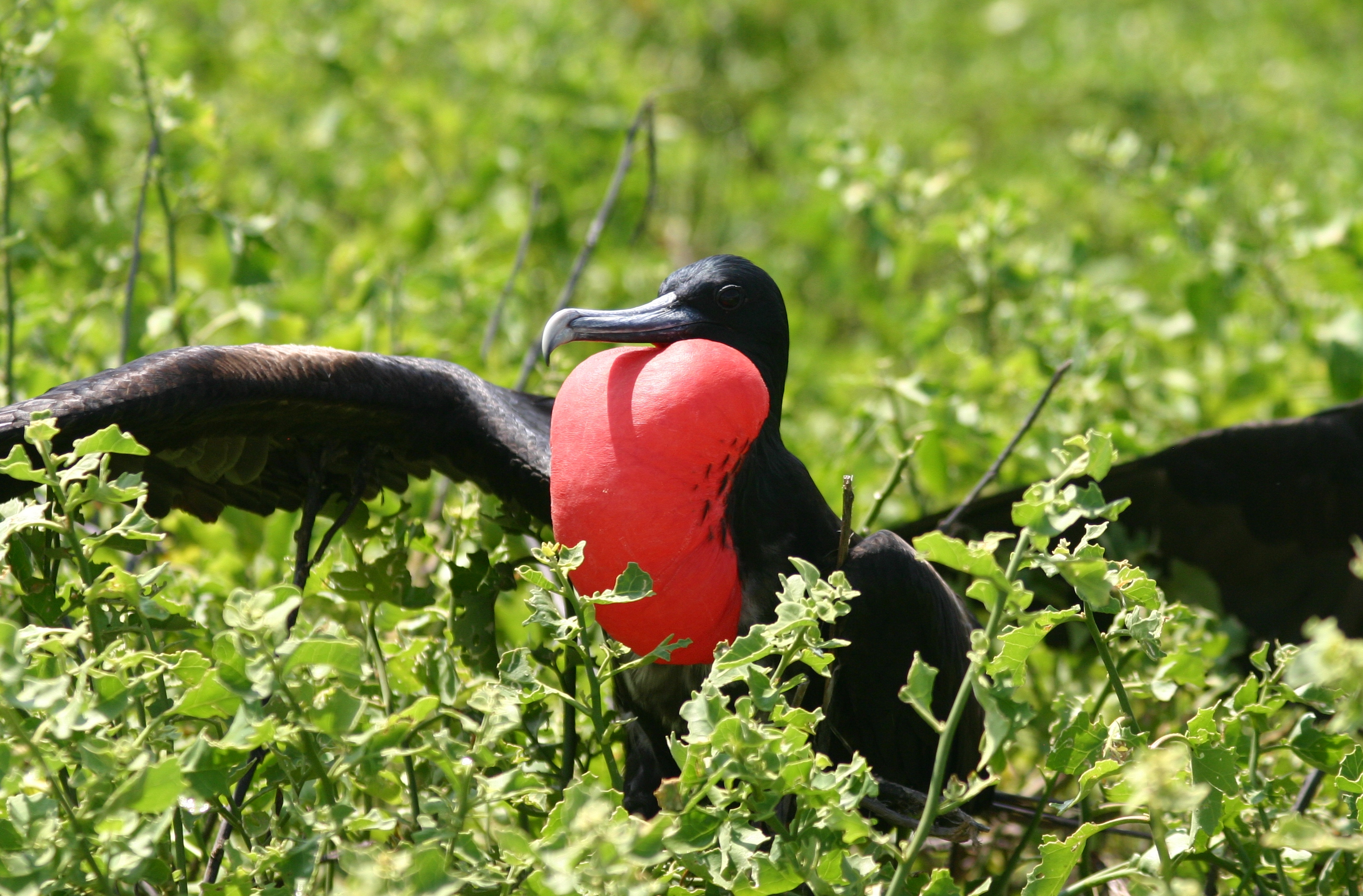
Great frigatebird

Order: Suliformes Family: Fregatidae

Frigatebirds are large seabirds usually found over tropical oceans. They are large, black-and-white or completely black, with long wings and deeply forked tails. The males have colored inflatable throat pouches. They do not swim or walk and cannot take off from a flat surface. Having the largest wingspan-to-body-weight ratio of any bird, they are essentially aerial, able to stay aloft for more than a week.

- Lesser frigatebird, Fregata ariel
- Ascension frigatebird, Fregata aquila (V)
- Magnificent frigatebird, Fregata magnificens
- Great frigatebird, Fregata minor

== Boobies ==
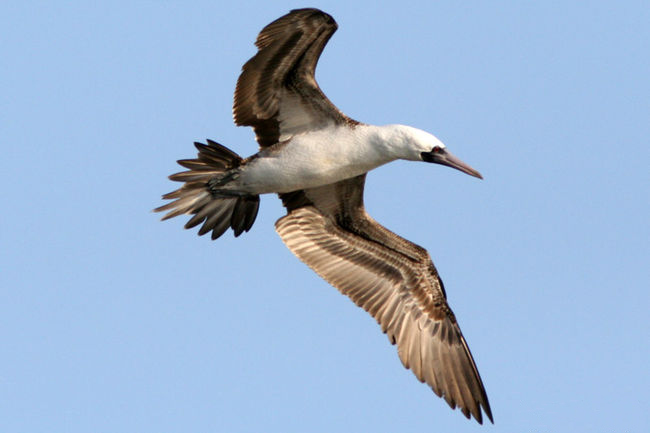
Peruvian booby

Order: Suliformes Family: Sulidae

The sulids comprise the gannets and boobies. Both groups are medium to large coastal seabirds that plunge-dive for fish.

- Cape gannet, Morus capensis (V)
- Australasian gannet, Morus serrator (V)
- Blue-footed booby, Sula nebouxii
- Peruvian booby, Sula variegata (E-SA)
- Masked booby, Sula dactylatra
- Nazca booby, Sula granti
- Red-footed booby, Sula sula
- Brown booby, Sula leucogaster
- Brewster's booby, Sula brewsteri

== Anhingas ==
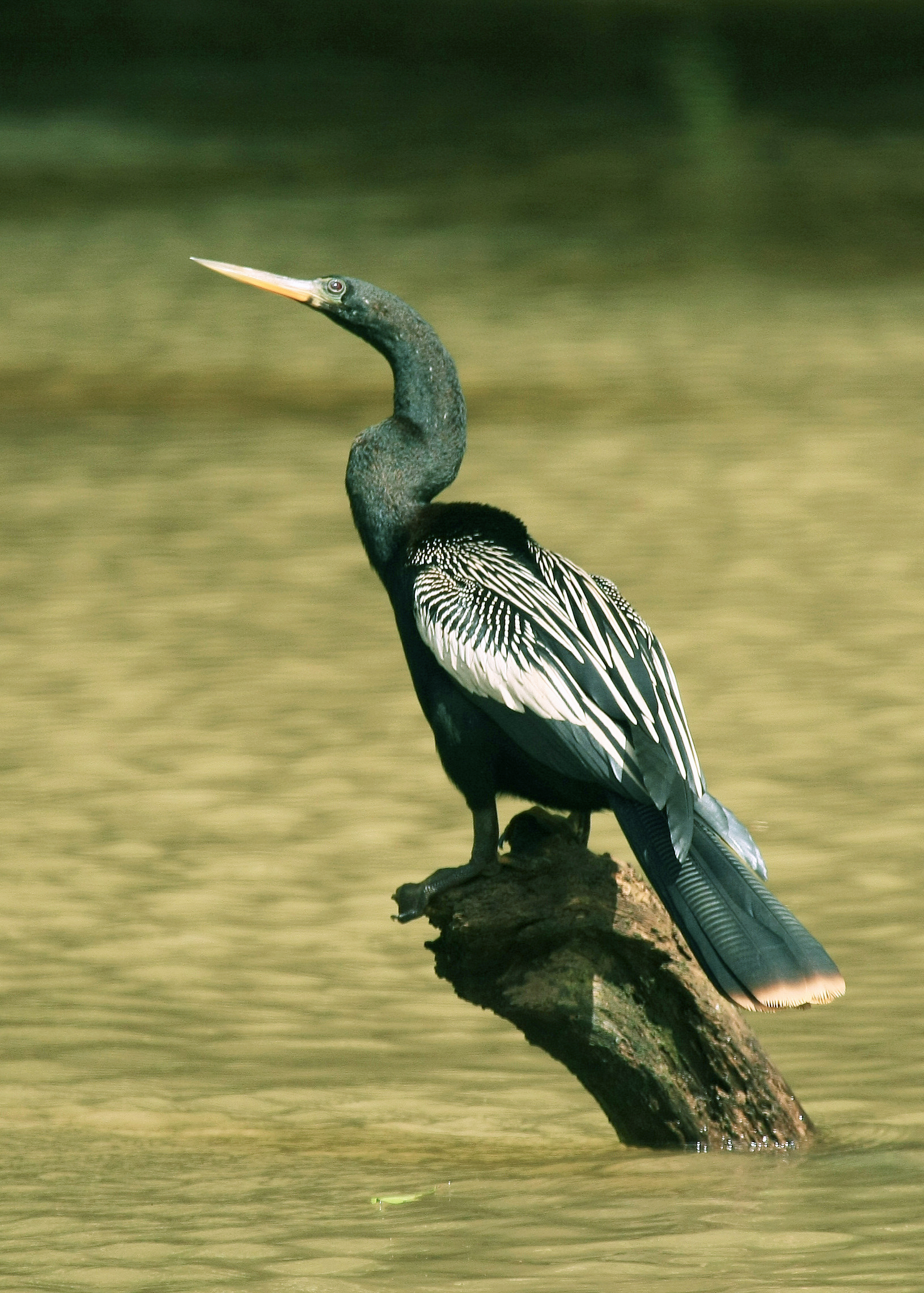
Anhinga

Order: Suliformes Family: Anhingidae

Anhingas are often called "snake-birds" because of their long thin neck, which gives a snake-like appearance when they swim with their bodies submerged. The males have black and dark-brown plumage, an erectile crest on the nape, and a larger bill than the female. The females have much paler plumage especially on the neck and underparts. The darters have completely webbed feet and their legs are short and set far back on the body. Their plumage is somewhat permeable, like that of cormorants, and they spread their wings to dry after diving.

- Anhinga, Anhinga anhinga

== Cormorants ==
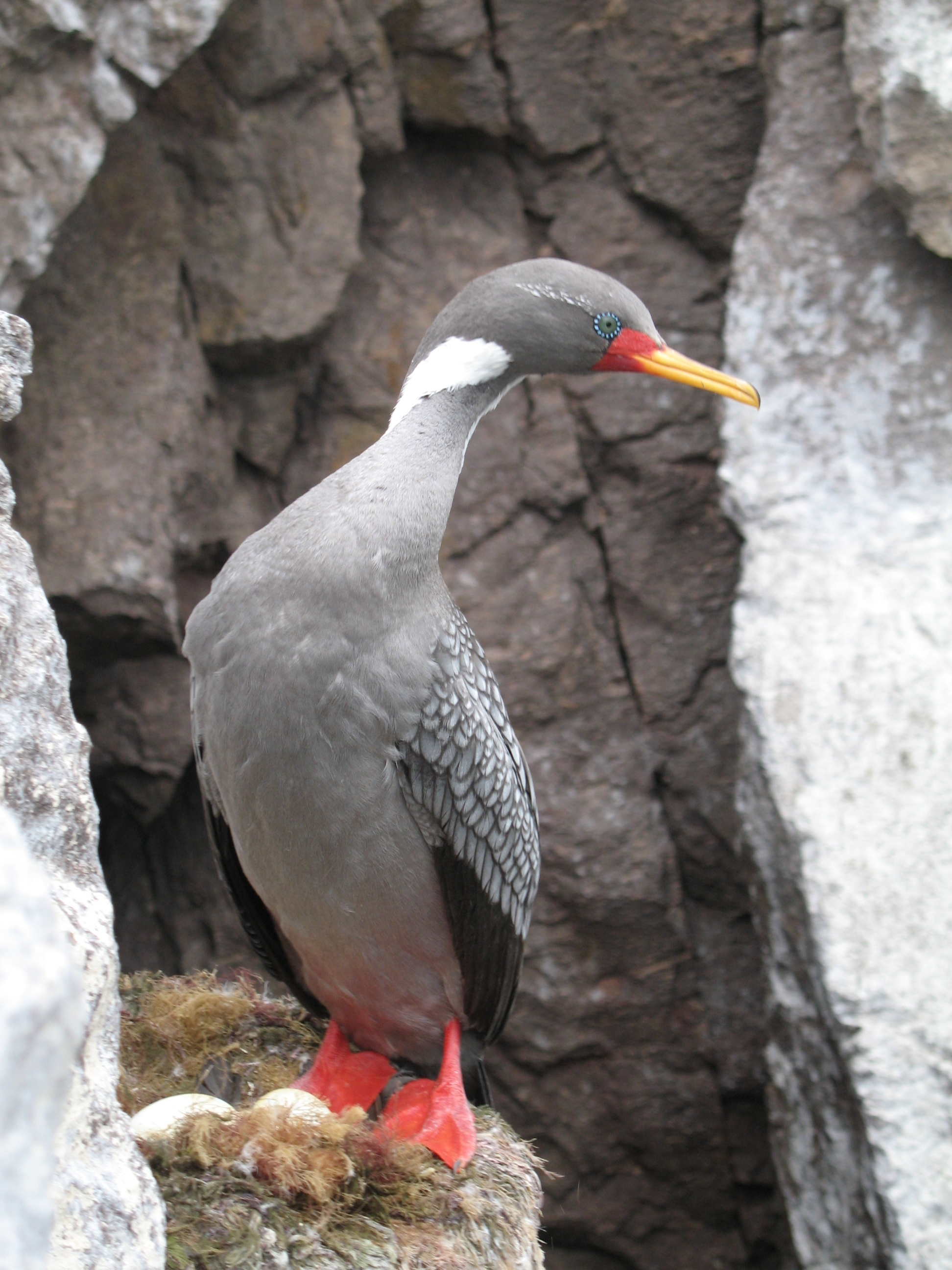
Red-legged cormorant

Order: Suliformes Family: Phalacrocoracidae

Phalacrocoracidae is a family of medium to large coastal, fish-eating seabirds that includes cormorants and shags. Plumage coloration varies, with the majority having mainly dark plumage, some species being black-and-white, and a few being colorful.

- Red-legged cormorant, Phalacrocorax gaimardi (E-SA)
- Flightless cormorant, Phalacrocorax harrisi (E-GA)
- Neotropic cormorant, Phalacrocorax brasilianus (All)
- Magellanic cormorant, Phalacrocorax magellanicus (E-SA)
- Guanay cormorant, Phalacrocorax bougainvillii (E-SA)
- Imperial cormorant, Phalacrocorax atriceps (E-SA)

== Pelicans ==
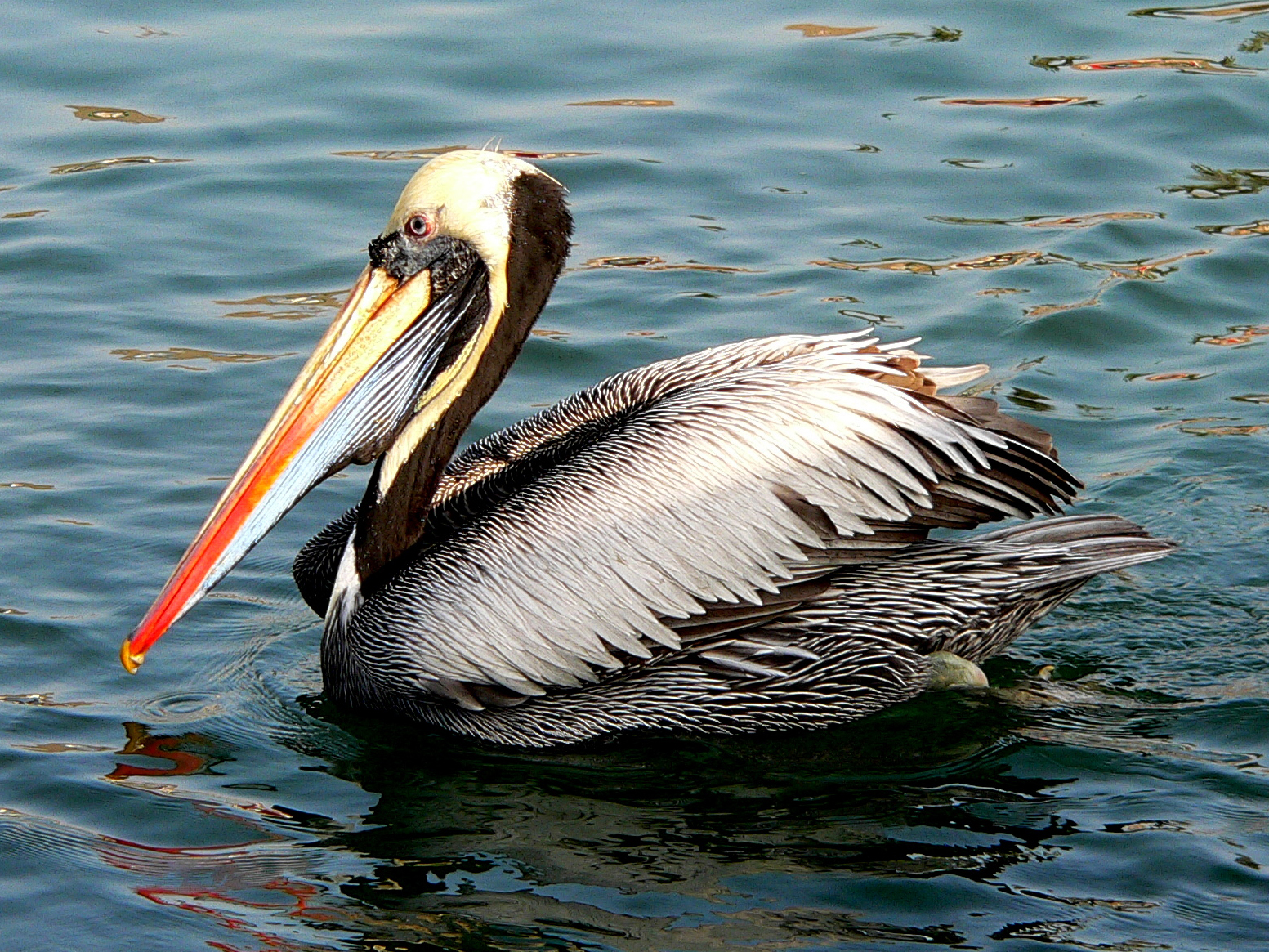
Peruvian pelican

Order: Pelecaniformes Family: Pelecanidae

Pelicans are large water birds with a distinctive pouch under their beak. As with other members of the order Pelecaniformes, they have webbed feet with four toes.

- Brown pelican, Pelecanus occidentalis
- Peruvian pelican, Pelecanus thagus (E-SA)

== Herons ==
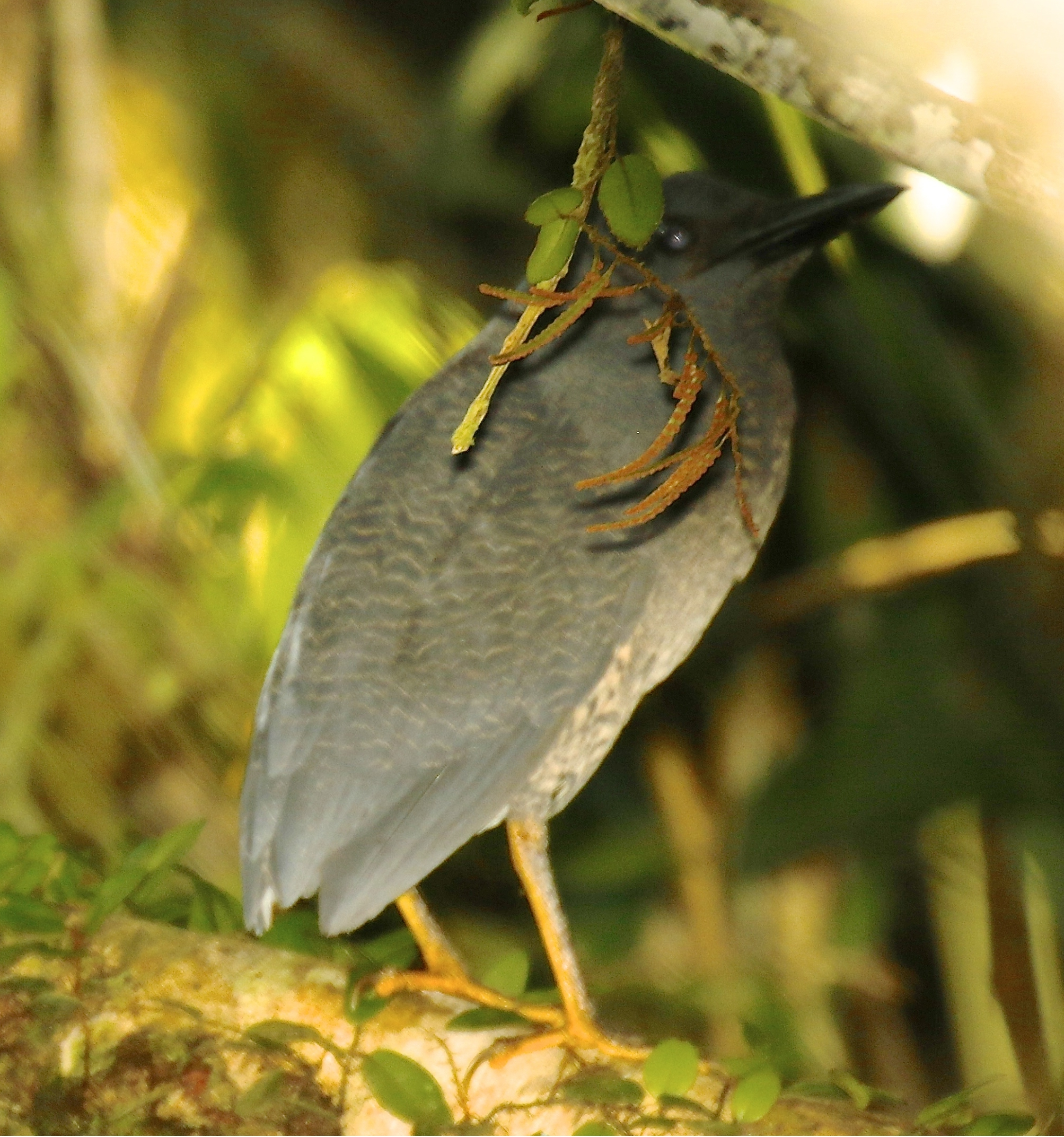
Zigzag heron

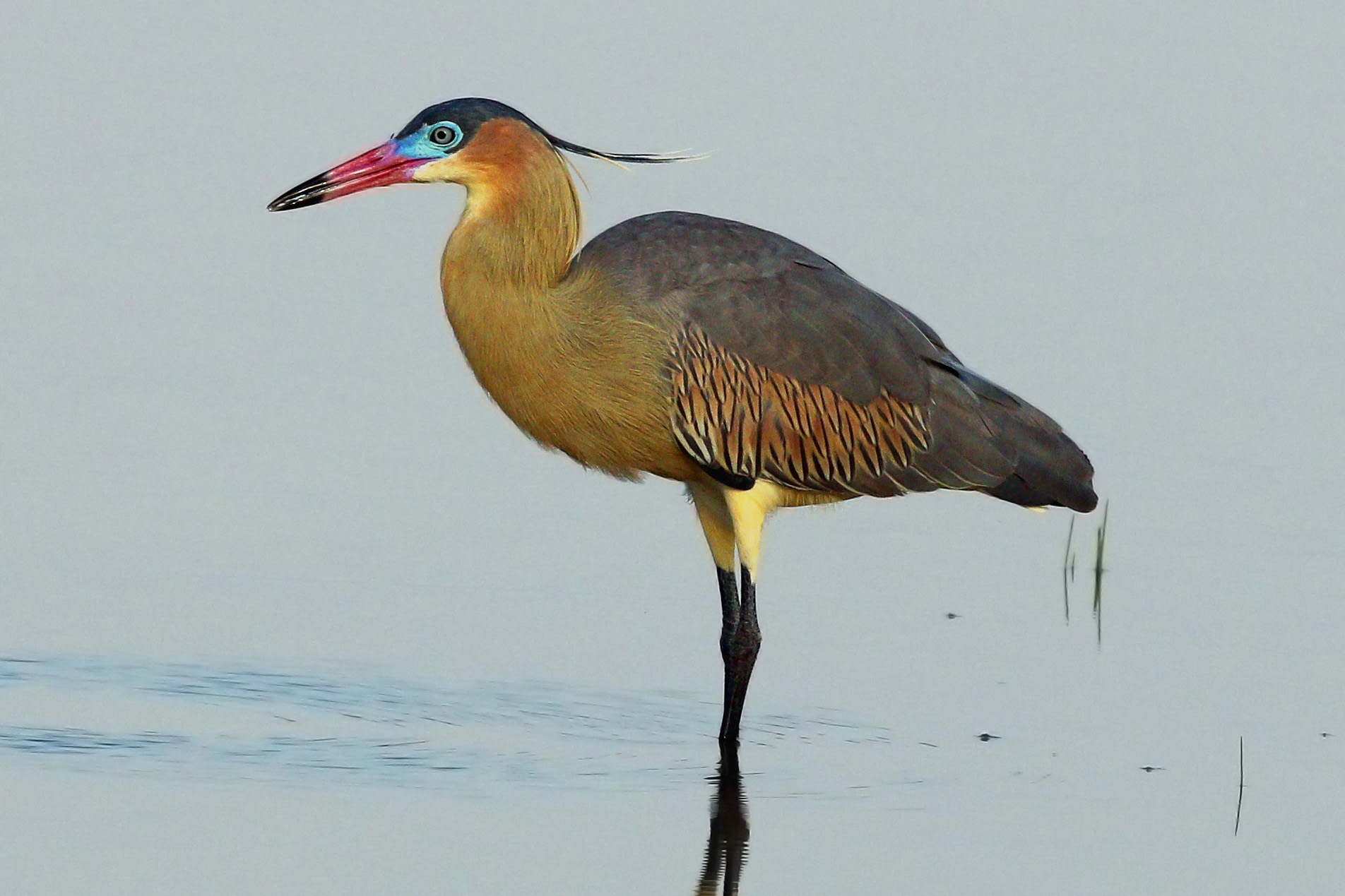
Whistling heron

Order: Pelecaniformes Family: Ardeidae

The family Ardeidae contains the bitterns, herons, and egrets. Herons and egrets are medium to large wading birds with long necks and legs. Bitterns tend to be shorter necked and more wary. Members of Ardeidae fly with their necks retracted, unlike other long-necked birds such as storks, ibises, and spoonbills.

- Rufescent tiger-heron, Tigrisoma lineatum
- Bare-throated tiger-heron, Tigrisoma mexicanum
- Fasciated tiger-heron, Tigrisoma fasciatum
- Boat-billed heron, Cochlearius cochlearius
- Agami heron, Agamia agami
- Zigzag heron, Zebrilus undulatus (E-SA)
- Stripe-backed bittern, Ixobrychus involucris (E-SA)
- Least bittern, Ixobrychus exilis
- Pinnated bittern, Botaurus pinnatus
- Capped heron, Pilherodius pileatus
- Whistling heron, Syrigma sibilatrix (E-SA)
- Little blue heron, Egretta caerulea
- Tricolored heron, Egretta tricolor
- Reddish egret, Egretta rufescens
- Snowy egret, Egretta thula (All)
- Little egret, Egretta garzetta (V)
- Western reef-heron, Egretta gularis (V)
- Yellow-crowned night-heron, Nyctanassa violacea
- Black-crowned night-heron, Nycticorax nycticorax (All)
- Striated heron, Butorides striata (All)
- Green heron, Butorides virescens
- Squacco heron, Ardeola ralloides (V)
- Cattle egret, Ardea ibis (All)
- Great egret, Ardea alba (All)
- Gray heron, Ardea cinerea (V)
- Great blue heron, Ardea herodias
- Cocoi heron, Ardea cocoi
- Purple heron, Ardea purpurea (V)

== Ibises ==
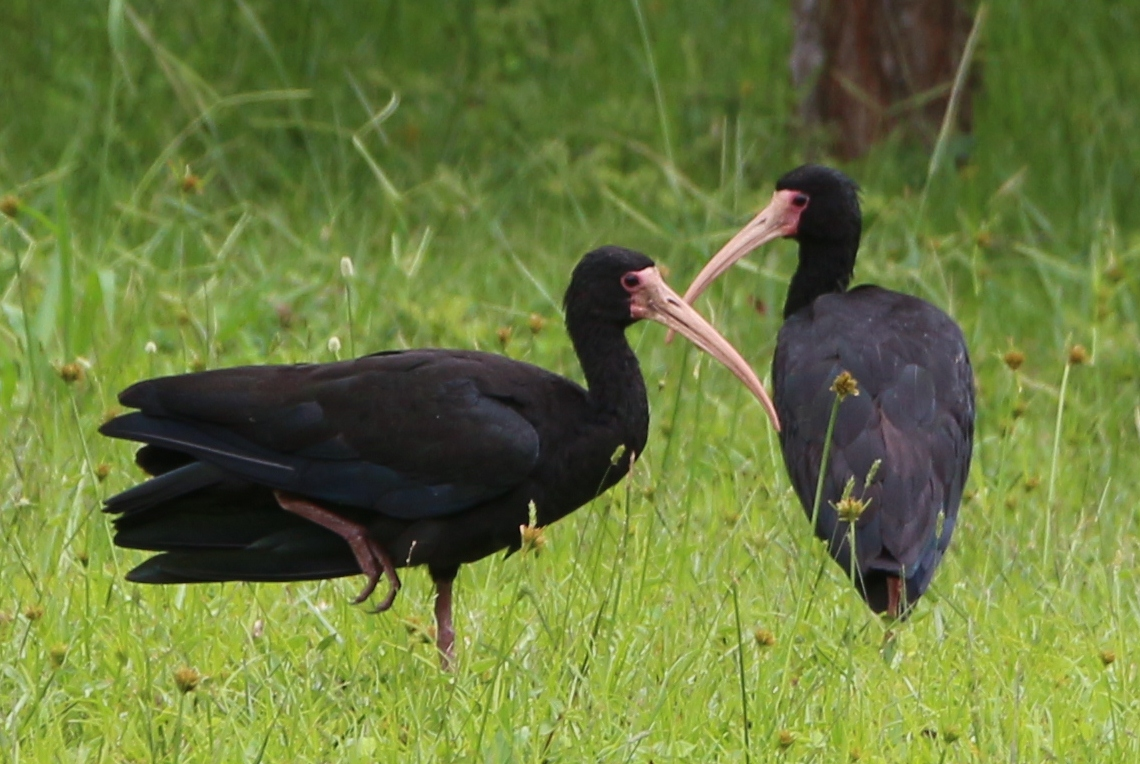
Sharp-tailed ibis

Order: Pelecaniformes Family: Threskiornithidae

Threskiornithidae is a family of large terrestrial and wading birds which includes the ibises and spoonbills. They have long, broad wings with 11 primary and about 20 secondary feathers. They are strong fliers and despite their size and weight, very capable soarers.

- White ibis, Eudocimus albus
- Scarlet ibis, Eudocimus ruber (E-SA)
- Glossy ibis, Plegadis falcinellus
- White-faced ibis, Plegadis chihi
- Puna ibis, Plegadis ridgwayi (E-SA)
- Sharp-tailed ibis, Cercibis oxycerca (E-SA)
- Green ibis, Mesembrinibis cayennensis
- Bare-faced ibis, Phimosus infuscatus (E-SA)
- Plumbeous ibis, Theristicus caerulescens (E-SA)
- Buff-necked ibis, Theristicus caudatus (E-SA)
- Andean ibis, Theristicus branickii (E-SA)
- Black-faced ibis, Theristicus melanopis (E-SA)
- Eurasian spoonbill, Platalea leucorodia (V)
- Roseate spoonbill, Platalea ajaja (All)

== New World vultures ==
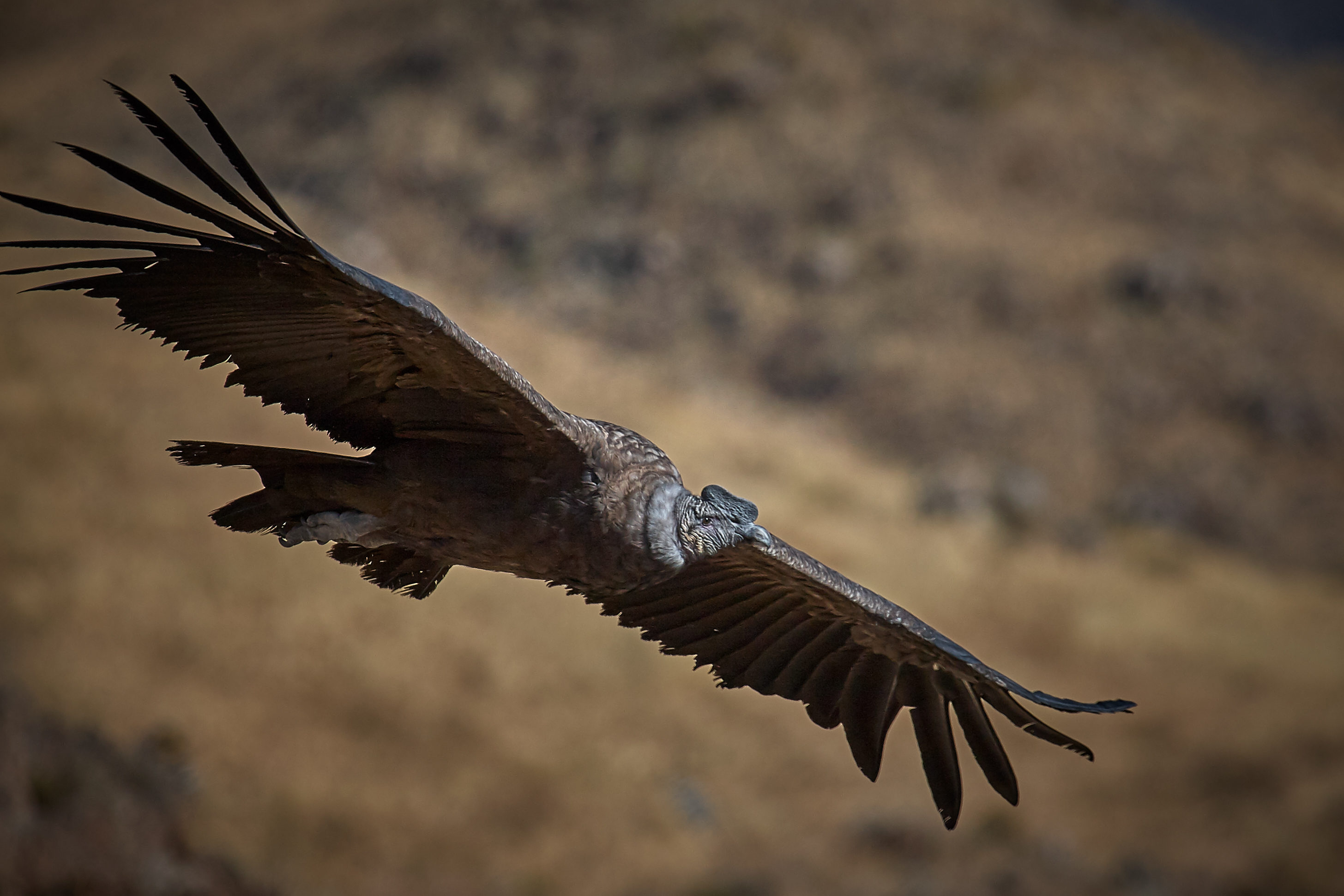
Andean condor

Order: Cathartiformes Family: Cathartidae

The New World vultures are not closely related to Old World vultures, but superficially resemble them because of convergent evolution. Like the Old World vultures, they are scavengers. However, unlike Old World vultures, which find carcasses by sight, New World vultures have a good sense of smell with which they locate carrion.

- King vulture, Sarcoramphus papa
- Andean condor, Vultur gryphus (E-SA)
- Black vulture, Coragyps atratus
- Turkey vulture, Cathartes aura
- Lesser yellow-headed vulture, Cathartes burrovianus
- Greater yellow-headed vulture, Cathartes melambrotus (E-SA)

== Osprey ==
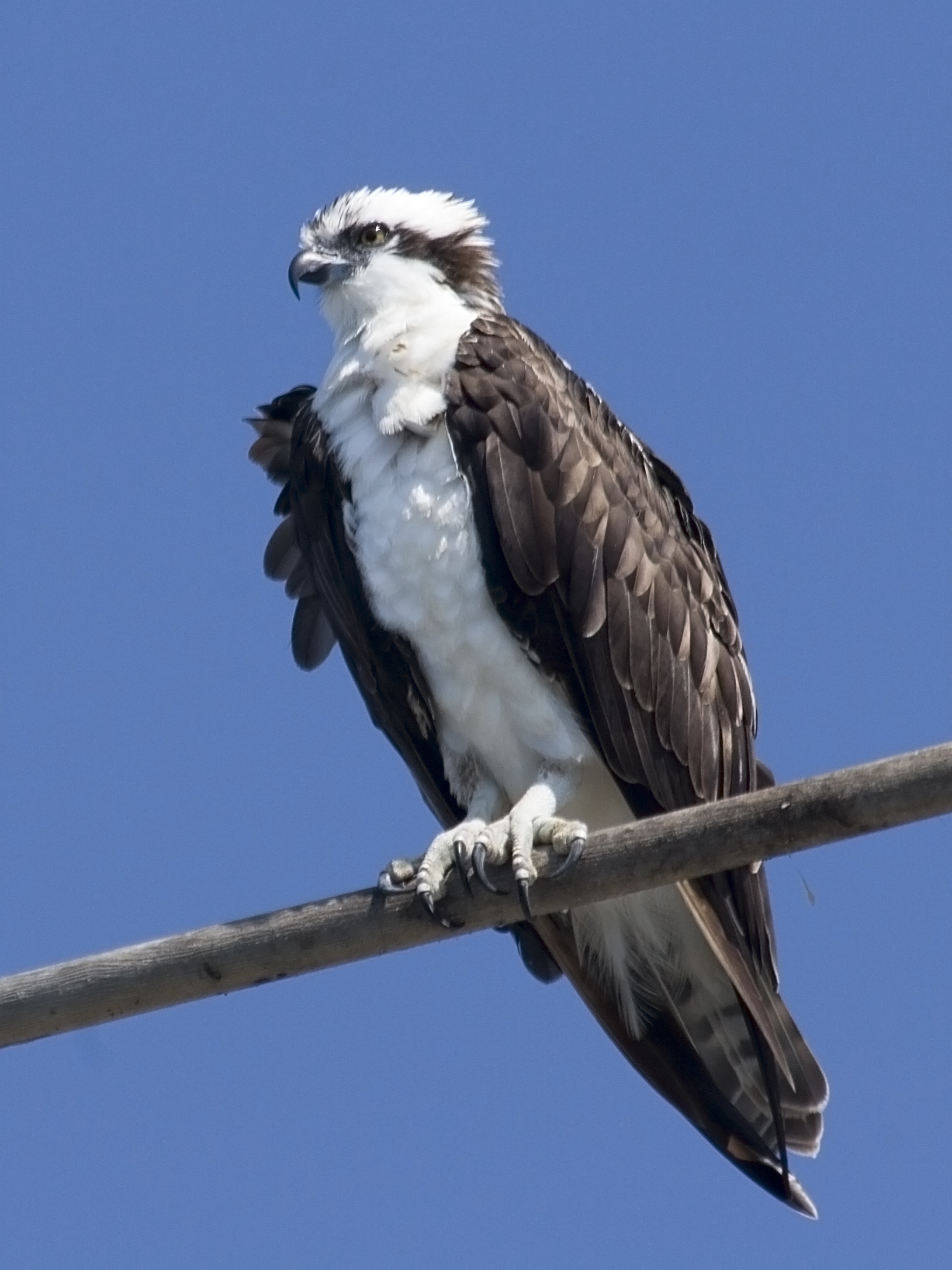
Osprey

Order: Accipitriformes Family: Pandionidae

The family Pandionidae contains only one species, the osprey. The osprey is a medium-large raptor which is a specialist fish-eater with a worldwide distribution.

- Osprey, Pandion haliaetus

== Hawks ==
Order: Accipitriformes Family: Accipitridae

Accipitridae is a family of birds of prey, which includes hawks, eagles, kites, harriers, and Old World vultures. These birds have powerful hooked beaks for tearing flesh from their prey, strong legs, powerful talons, and keen eyesight.

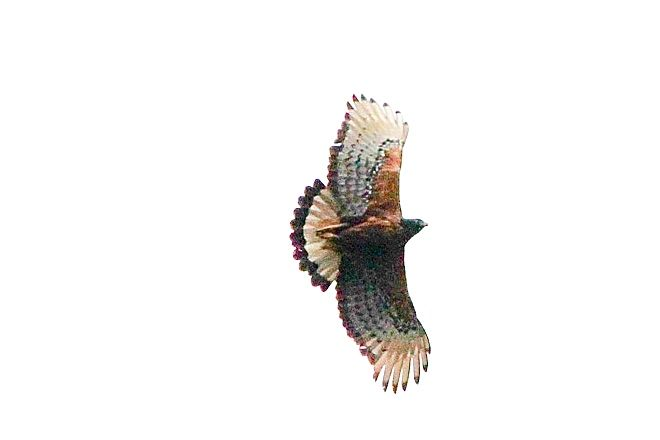
Black-and-chestnut eagle

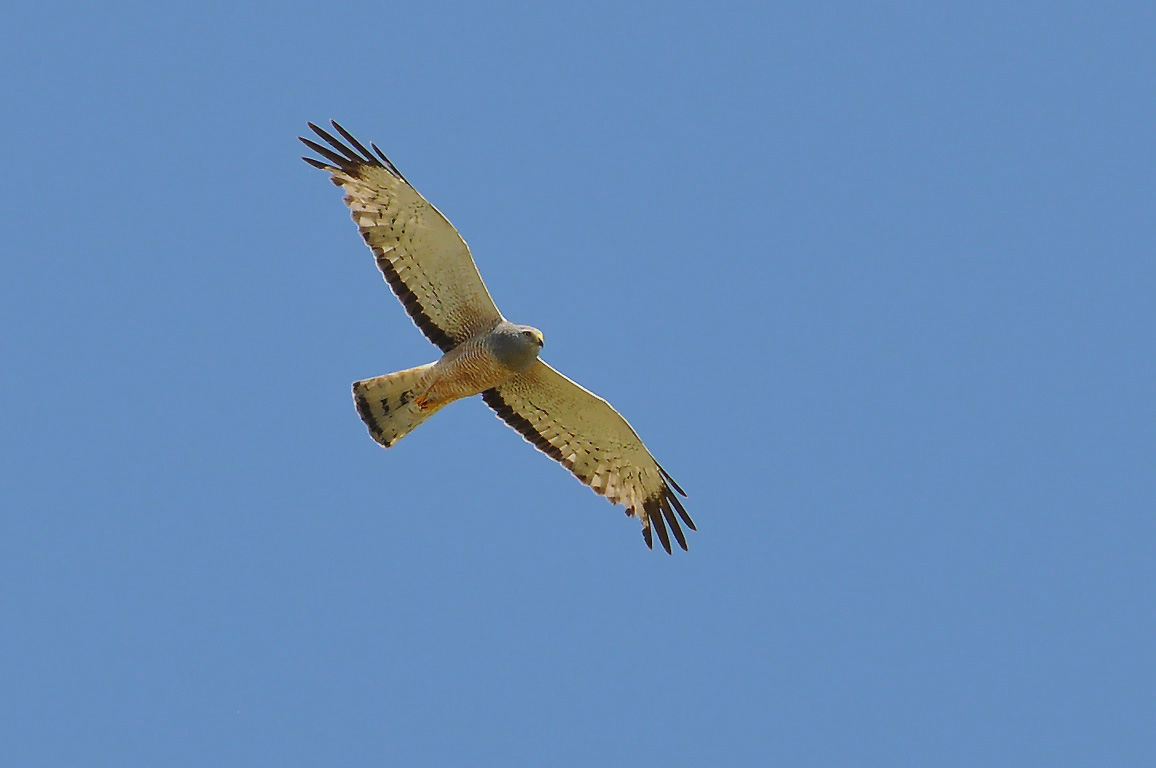
Cinereous harrier

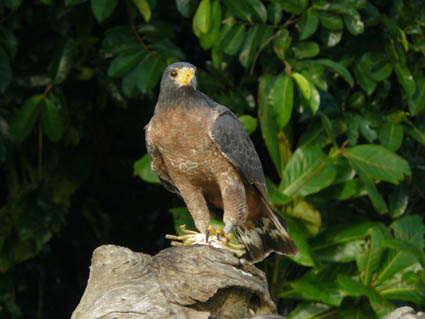
Rufous crab hawk

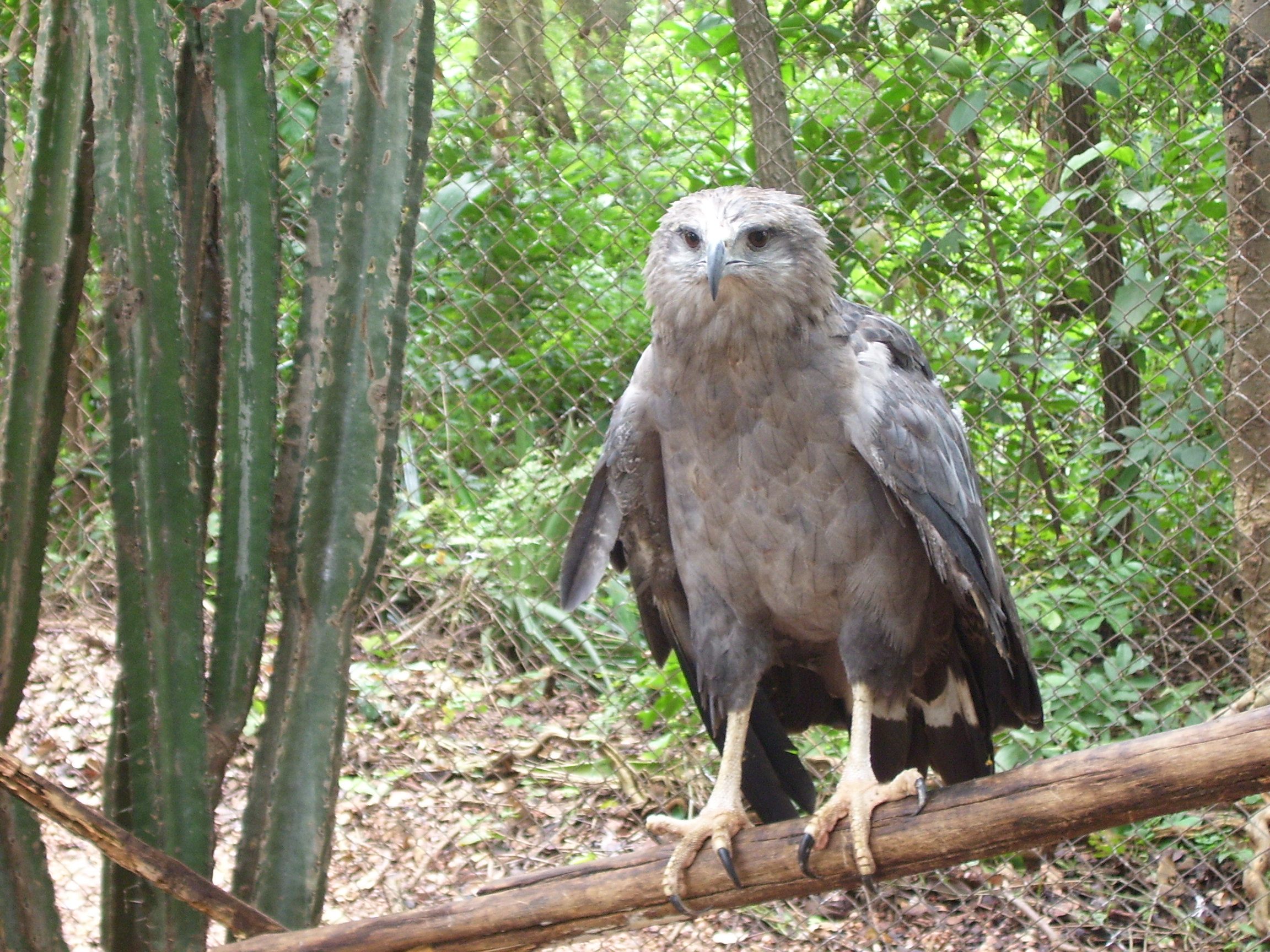
Chaco eagle

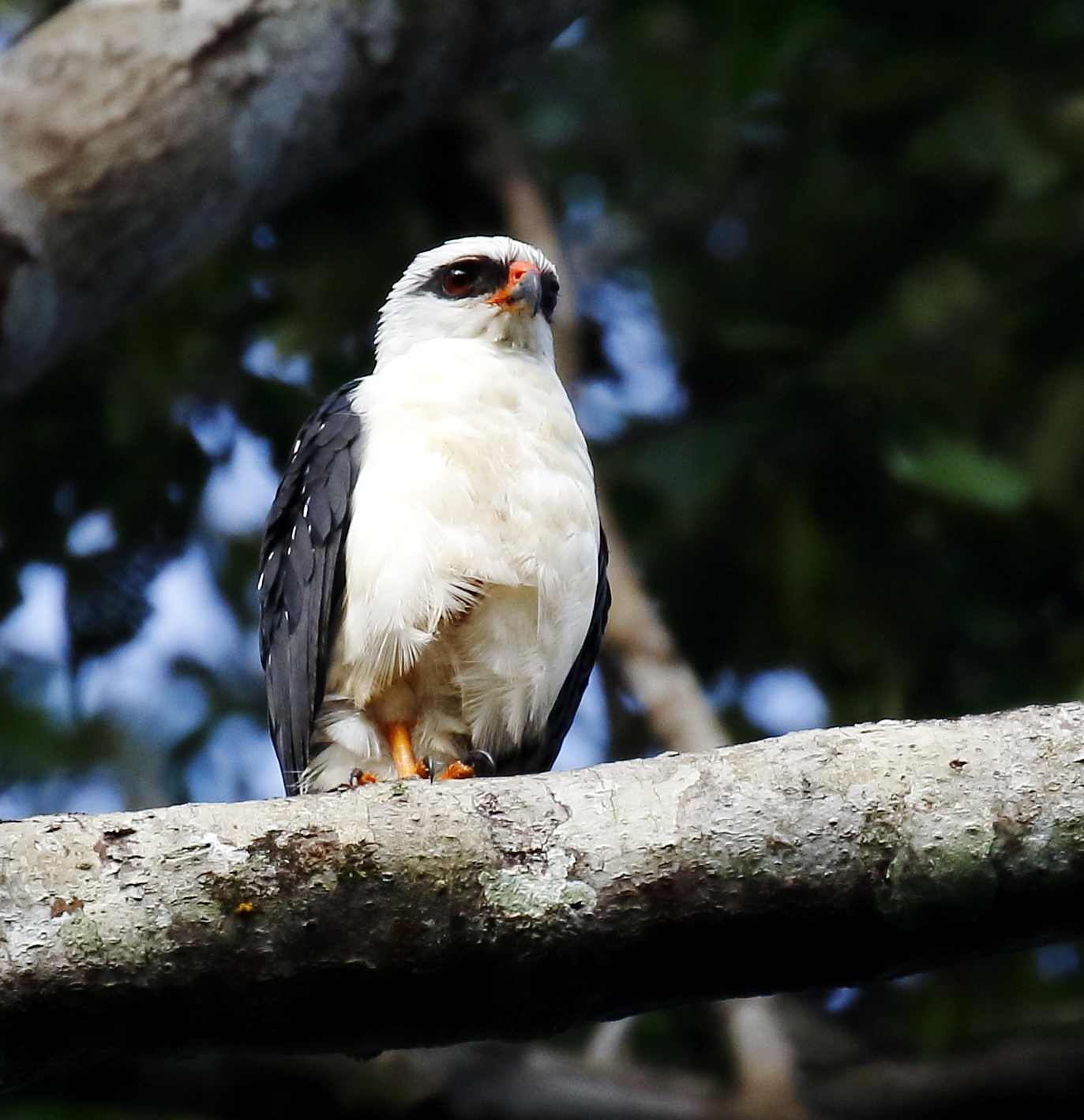
Black-faced hawk
- Pearl kite, Gampsonyx swainsonii
- White-tailed kite, Elanus leucurus
- Hook-billed kite, Chondrohierax uncinatus
- Gray-headed kite, Leptodon cayanensis
- White-collared kite, Leptodon forbesi (E-BR)
- Swallow-tailed kite, Elanoides forficatus
- Crested eagle, Morphnus guianensis
- Harpy eagle, Harpia harpyja
- Black hawk-eagle, Spizaetus tyrannus
- Black-and-white hawk-eagle, Spizaetus melanoleucus
- Ornate hawk-eagle, Spizaetus ornatus
- Black-and-chestnut eagle, Spizaetus isidori (E-SA)
- Black-collared hawk, Busarellus nigricollis
- Snail kite, Rostrhamus sociabilis
- Slender-billed kite, Helicolestes hamatus
- Double-toothed kite, Harpagus bidentatus
- Rufous-thighed kite, Harpagus diodon (E-SA)
- Mississippi kite, Ictinia mississippiensis
- Plumbeous kite, Ictinia plumbea
- Gray-bellied hawk, Accipiter poliogaster (E-SA)
- Sharp-shinned hawk, Accipiter striatus
- Cooper's hawk, Astur cooperii (V)
- Bicolored hawk, Astur bicolor
- Northern harrier, Circus hudsonius
- Cinereous harrier, Circus cinereus (E-SA)
- Long-winged harrier, Circus buffoni (E-SA)
- Tiny hawk, Microspizias superciliosus
- Semicollared hawk, Microspizias collaris (E-SA)
- Black kite, Milvus migrans (V)
- Crane hawk, Geranospiza caerulescens
- Plumbeous hawk, Cryptoleucopteryx plumbea
- Slate-colored hawk, Buteogallus schistaceus (E-SA)
- Common black hawk, Buteogallus anthracinus
- Rufous crab hawk, Buteogallus aequinoctialis (E-SA)
- Savanna hawk, Buteogallus meridionalis
- White-necked hawk, Buteogallus lacernulatus (E-BR)
- Great black hawk, Buteogallus urubitinga
- Solitary eagle, Buteogallus solitarius
- Chaco eagle, Buteogallus coronatus (E-SA)
- Barred hawk, Morphnarchus princeps
- Roadside hawk, Rupornis magnirostris
- Harris's hawk, Parabuteo unicinctus
- White-rumped hawk, Parabuteo leucorrhous (E-SA)
- White-tailed hawk, Geranoaetus albicaudatus
- Variable hawk, Geranoaetus polyosoma (E-SA)
- Black-chested buzzard-eagle, Geranoaetus melanoleucus (E-SA)
- Mantled hawk, Pseudastur polionotus (E-SA)
- White hawk, Pseudastur albicollis
- Gray-backed hawk, Pseudastur occidentalis (E-SA)
- Semiplumbeous hawk, Leucopternis semiplumbeus
- Black-faced hawk, Leucopternis melanops (E-SA)
- White-browed hawk, Leucopternis kuhli (E-SA)
- Gray-lined hawk, Buteo nitidus
- Broad-winged hawk, Buteo platypterus
- White-throated hawk, Buteo albigula (E-SA)
- Short-tailed hawk, Buteo brachyurus
- Swainson's hawk, Buteo swainsoni
- Galapagos hawk, Buteo galapagoensis (E-GA)
- Zone-tailed hawk, Buteo albonotatus
- Red-tailed hawk, Buteo jamaicensis (V)
- Rufous-tailed hawk, Buteo ventralis (E-SA)

== Barn owls ==
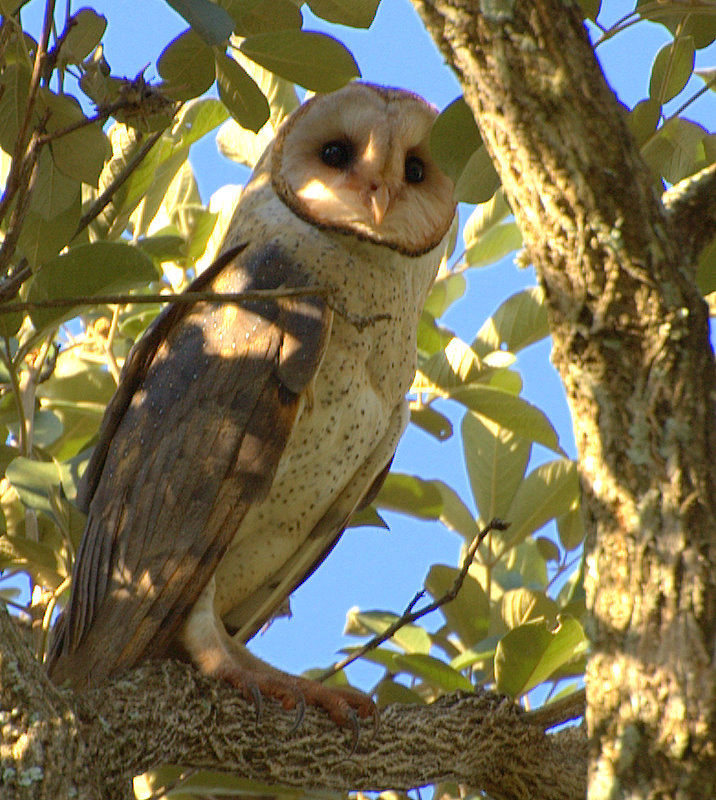
Barn owl

Order: Strigiformes Family: Tytonidae

Barn owls are medium to large owls with large heads and characteristic heart-shaped faces. They have long strong legs with powerful talons.

- American barn owl, Tyto furcata

== Owls ==
Order: Strigiformes Family: Strigidae

The typical owls are small to large solitary nocturnal birds of prey. They have large forward-facing eyes and ears, a hawk-like beak, and a conspicuous circle of feathers around each eye called a facial disk.

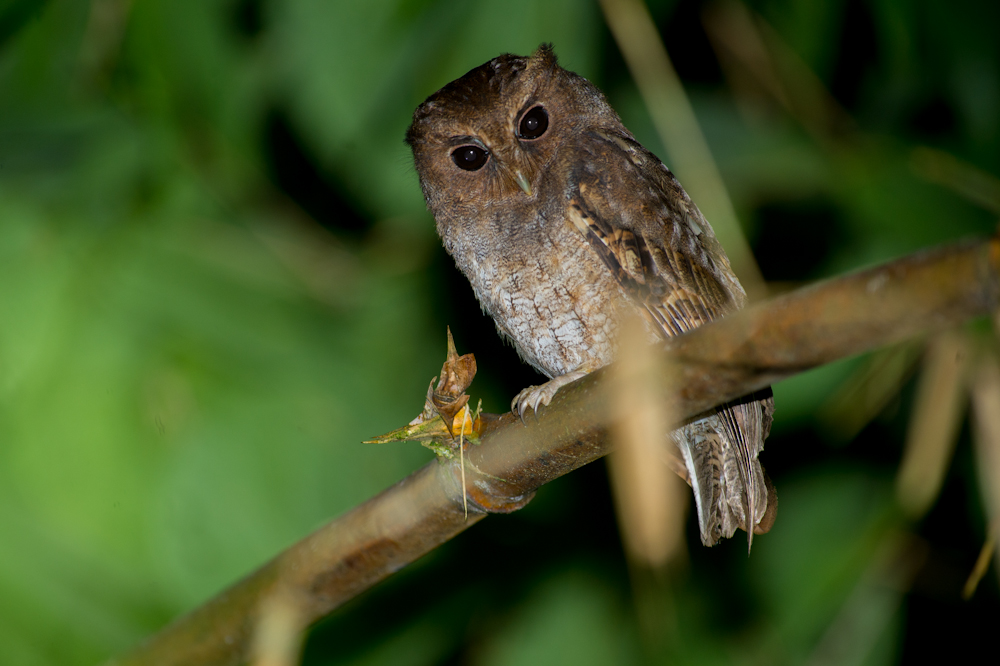
Rufescent screech-owl

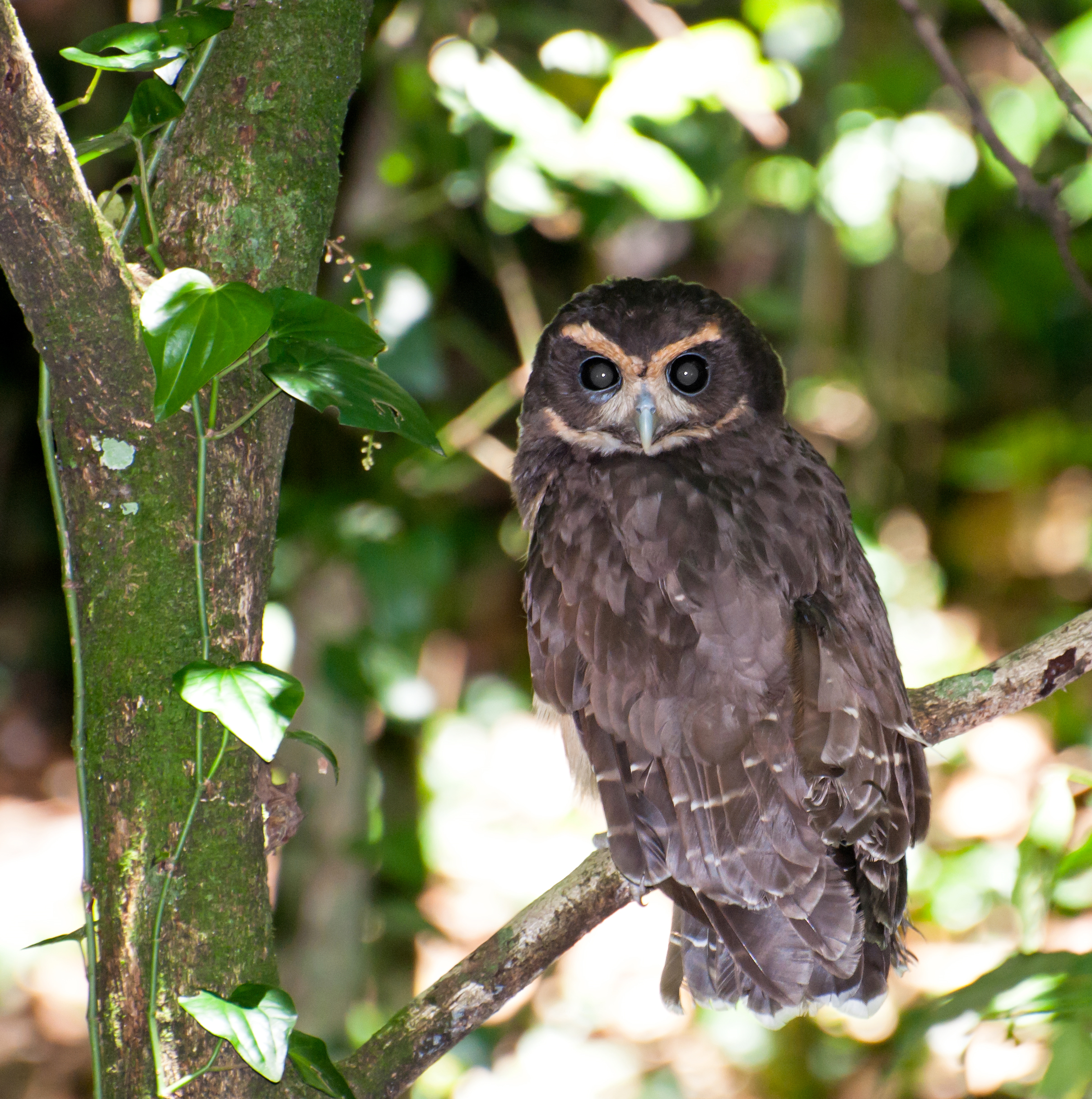
Tawny-browed owl

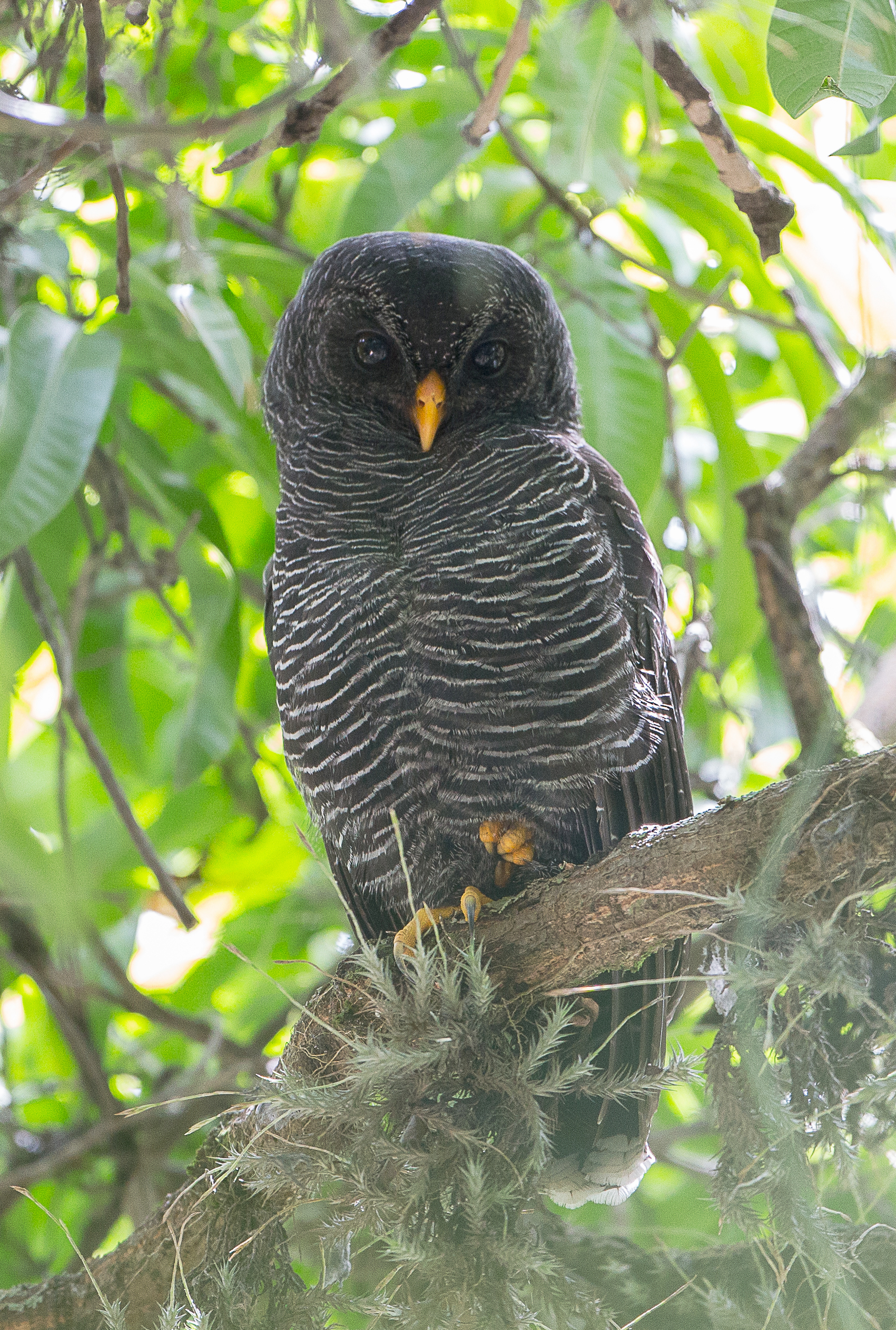
Black-banded owl

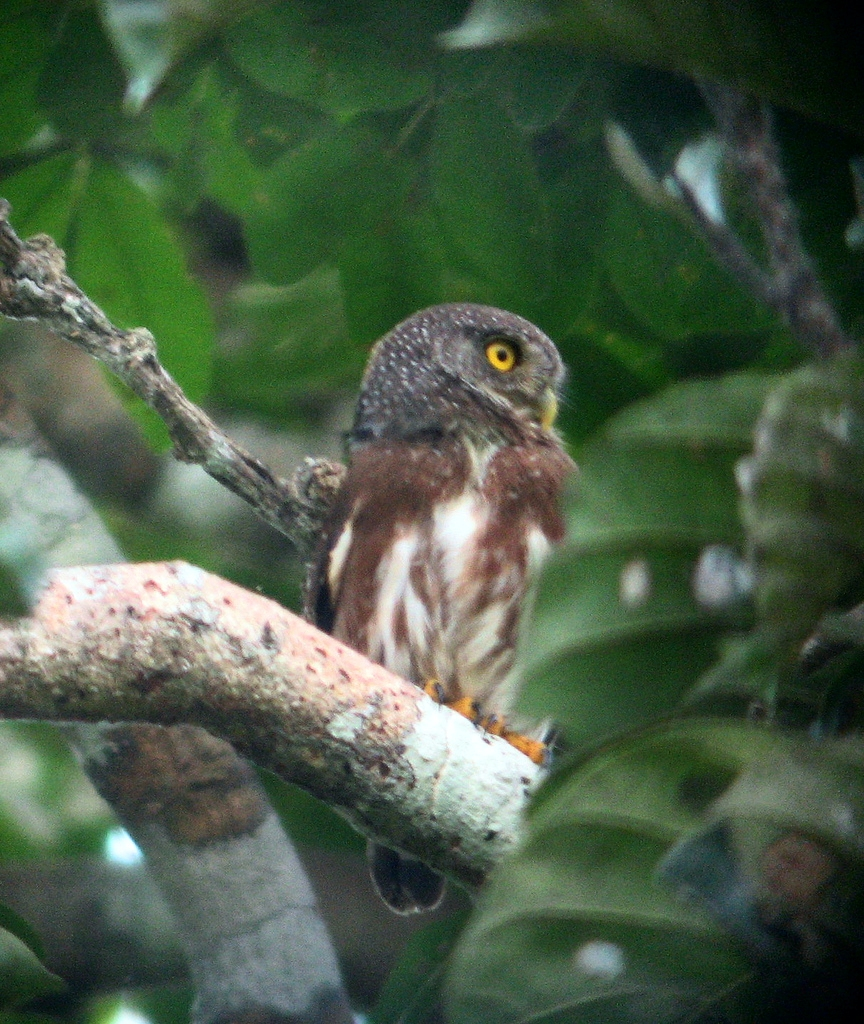
Amazonian pygmy-owl

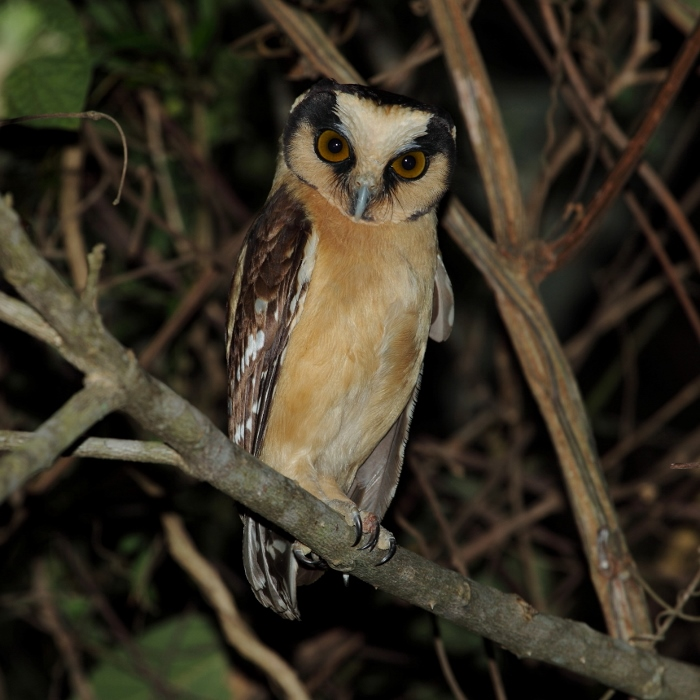
Buff-fronted owl
- Bare-shanked screech-owl, Megascops clarkii
- White-throated screech-owl, Megascops albogularis (E-SA)
- Tropical screech-owl, Megascops choliba
- Koepcke's screech-owl, Megascops koepckeae (E-SA)
- Rufescent screech-owl, Megascops ingens (E-SA)
- Cinnamon screech-owl, Megascops petersoni (E-SA)
- Cloud-forest screech-owl, Megascops marshalli (E-SA)
- Montane forest screech-owl, Megascops hoyi (E-SA)
- Choco screech-owl, Megascops centralis
- Foothill screech-owl, Megascops roraimae (E-SA)
- Long-tufted screech-owl, Megascops sanctaecatarinae (E-SA)
- Santa Marta screech-owl, Megascops gilesi (E-CO)
- Peruvian screech-owl, Megascops roboratus (E-SA)
- Tawny-bellied screech-owl, Megascops watsonii (E-SA)
- Black-capped screech-owl, Megascops atricapilla (E-SA)
- Crested owl, Lophostrix cristata
- Spectacled owl, Pulsatrix perspicillata
- Tawny-browed owl, Pulsatrix koeniswaldiana (E-SA)
- Band-bellied owl, Pulsatrix melanota (E-SA)
- Paramo horned owl, Bubo nigrescens (E-SA)
- Tropical horned owl, Bubo nacurutu (E-SA)
- Magellanic horned owl, Bubo magellanicus (E-SA)
- Rusty-barred owl, Strix hylophila (E-SA)
- Chaco owl, Strix chacoensis (E-SA)
- Rufous-legged owl, Strix rufipes (E-SA)
- Mottled owl, Strix virgata
- Black-and-white owl, Strix nigrolineata
- Black-banded owl, Strix huhula (E-SA)
- Rufous-banded owl, Strix albitarsis (E-SA)
- Cloud-forest pygmy-owl, Glaucidium nubicola (E-SA)
- Andean pygmy-owl, Glaucidium jardinii (E-SA)
- Yungas pygmy-owl, Glaucidium bolivianum (E-SA)
- Subtropical pygmy-owl, Glaucidium parkeri (E-SA)
- Central American pygmy-owl, Glaucidium griseiceps
- Amazonian pygmy-owl, Glaucidium hardyi (E-SA)
- Pernambuco pygmy-owl, Glaucidium mooreorum (E-BR)
- Least pygmy-owl, Glaucidium minutissimum (E-BR)
- Ferruginous pygmy-owl, Glaucidium brasilianum
- Peruvian pygmy-owl, Glaucidium peruanum (E-SA)
- Austral pygmy-owl, Glaucidium nana (E-SA)
- Long-whiskered owlet, Xenoglaux loweryi (E-PE)
- Burrowing owl, Athene cunicularia (All)
- Buff-fronted owl, Aegolius harrisii (E-SA)
- Striped owl, Asio clamator
- Stygian owl, Asio stygius
- Short-eared owl, Asio flammeus

== Trogons ==
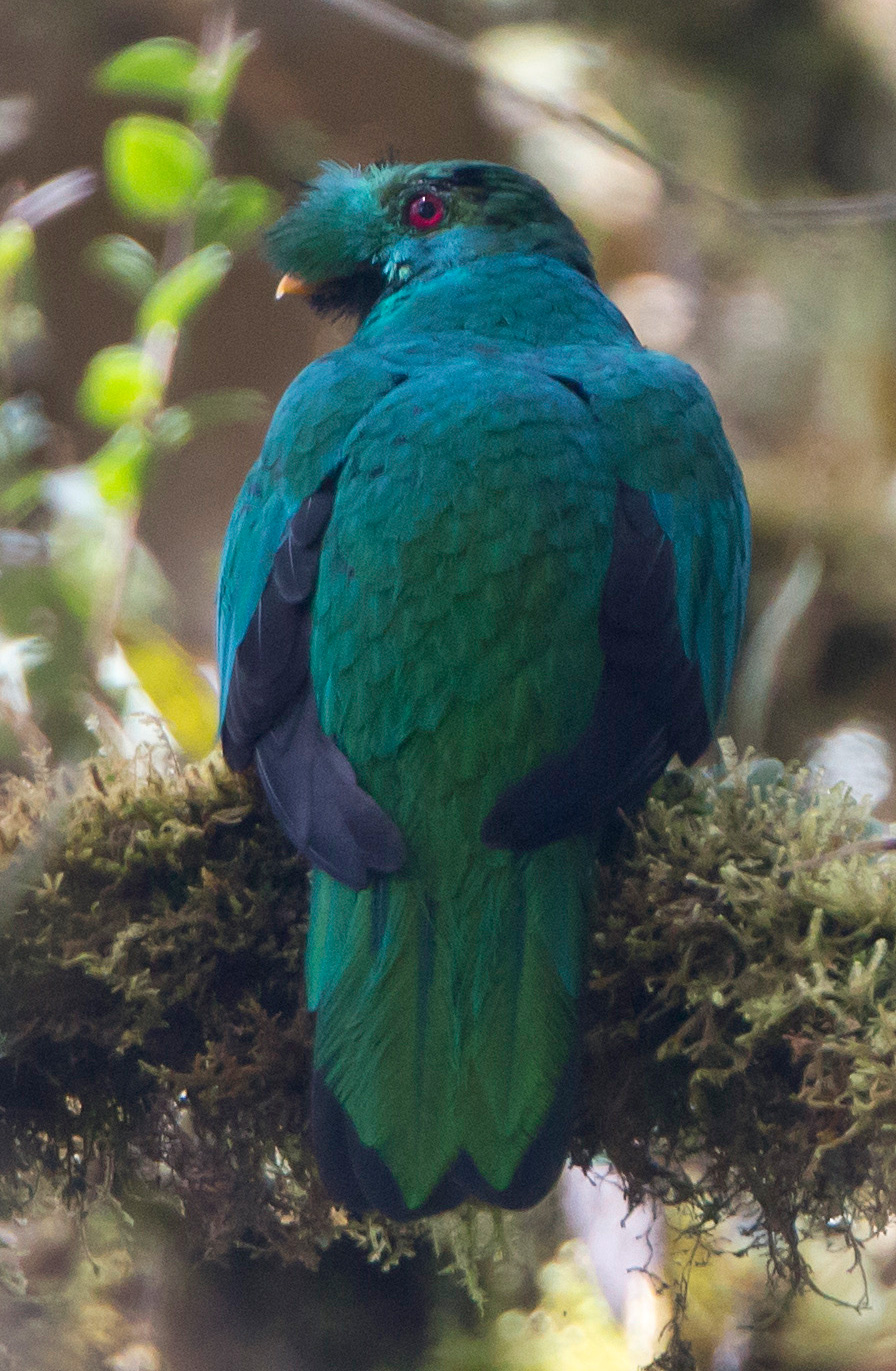
Crested quetzal

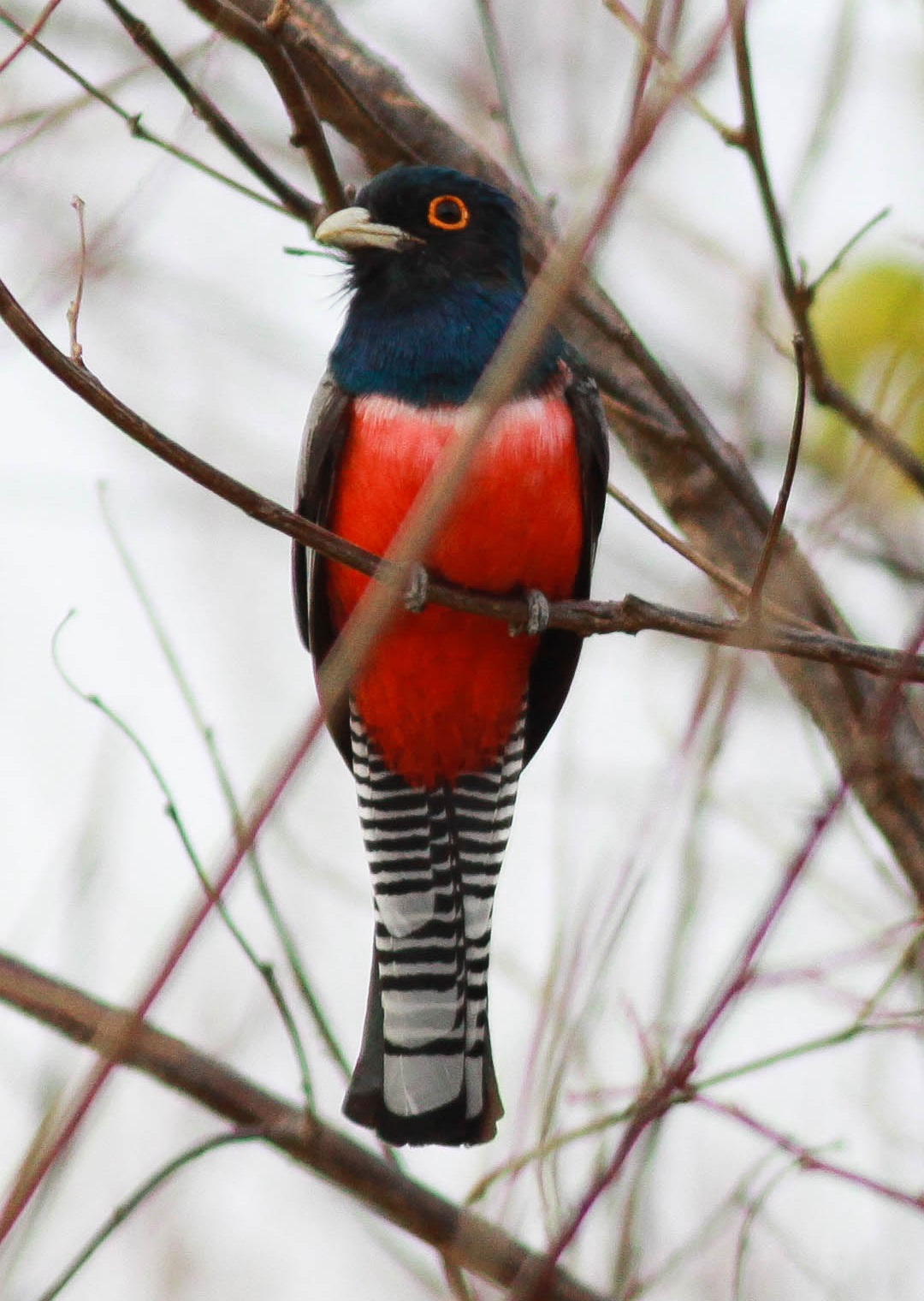
Blue-crowned trogon

Order: Trogoniformes Family: Trogonidae

The family Trogonidae includes trogons and quetzals. Found in tropical woodlands worldwide, they feed on insects and fruit, and their broad bills and weak legs reflect their diet and arboreal habits. Although their flight is fast, they are reluctant to fly any distance. Trogons have soft, often colorful, feathers with distinctive male and female plumage.

- Pavonine quetzal, Pharomachrus pavoninus (E-SA)
- Golden-headed quetzal, Pharomachrus auriceps
- White-tipped quetzal, Pharomachrus fulgidus (E-SA)
- Crested quetzal, Pharomachrus antisianus (E-SA)
- Slaty-tailed trogon, Trogon massena
- Blue-tailed trogon, Trogon comptus (E-SA)
- Ecuadorian trogon, Trogon mesurus (E-SA)
- Black-tailed trogon, Trogon melanurus
- White-tailed trogon, Trogon chionurus
- Green-backed trogon, Trogon viridis
- Gartered violaceous-trogon, Trogon caligatus
- Amazonian violaceous-trogon, Trogon ramonianus (E-SA)
- Guianan violaceous-trogon, Trogon violaceus (E-SA)
- Blue-crowned trogon, Trogon curucui (E-SA)
- Surucua trogon, Trogon surrucura (E-SA)
- Graceful black-throated trogon, Trogon tenellus
- Kerr's black-throated trogon, Trogon cupreicauda (E-SA)
- Amazonian black-throated trogon, Trogon rufus (E-SA)
- Atlantic black-throated trogon, Trogon chrysochloros (E-SA)
- Collared trogon, Trogon collaris
- Masked trogon, Trogon personatus (E-SA)

== Motmots ==
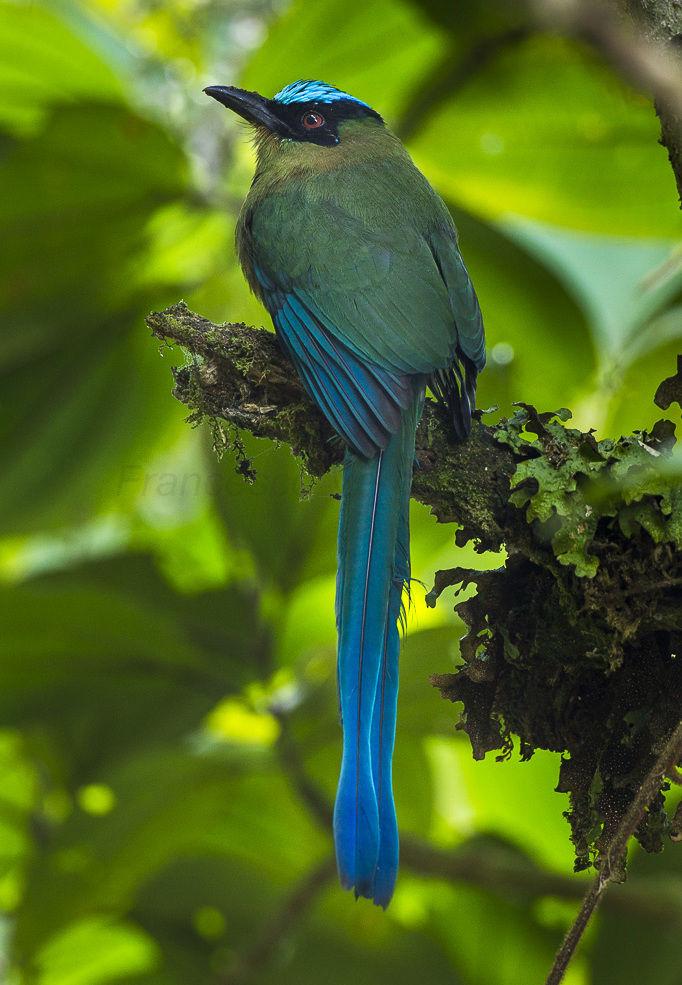
Andean motmot

Order: Coraciiformes Family: Momotidae

Motmots have colorful plumage and long, graduated tails which they display by waggling back and forth. In most of the species, the barbs near the ends of the two longest (central) tail feathers are weak and fall off, leaving a length of bare shaft and creating a racket-shaped tail.

- Tody motmot, Hylomanes momotula
- Broad-billed motmot, Electron platyrhynchum
- Rufous motmot, Baryphthengus martii
- Rufous-capped motmot, Baryphthengus ruficapillus
- Whooping motmot, Momotus subrufescens
- Trinidad motmot, Momotus bahamensis (E-TT)
- Amazonian motmot, Momotus momota (E-SA)
- Andean motmot, Momotus aequatorialis (E-SA)

== Kingfishers ==
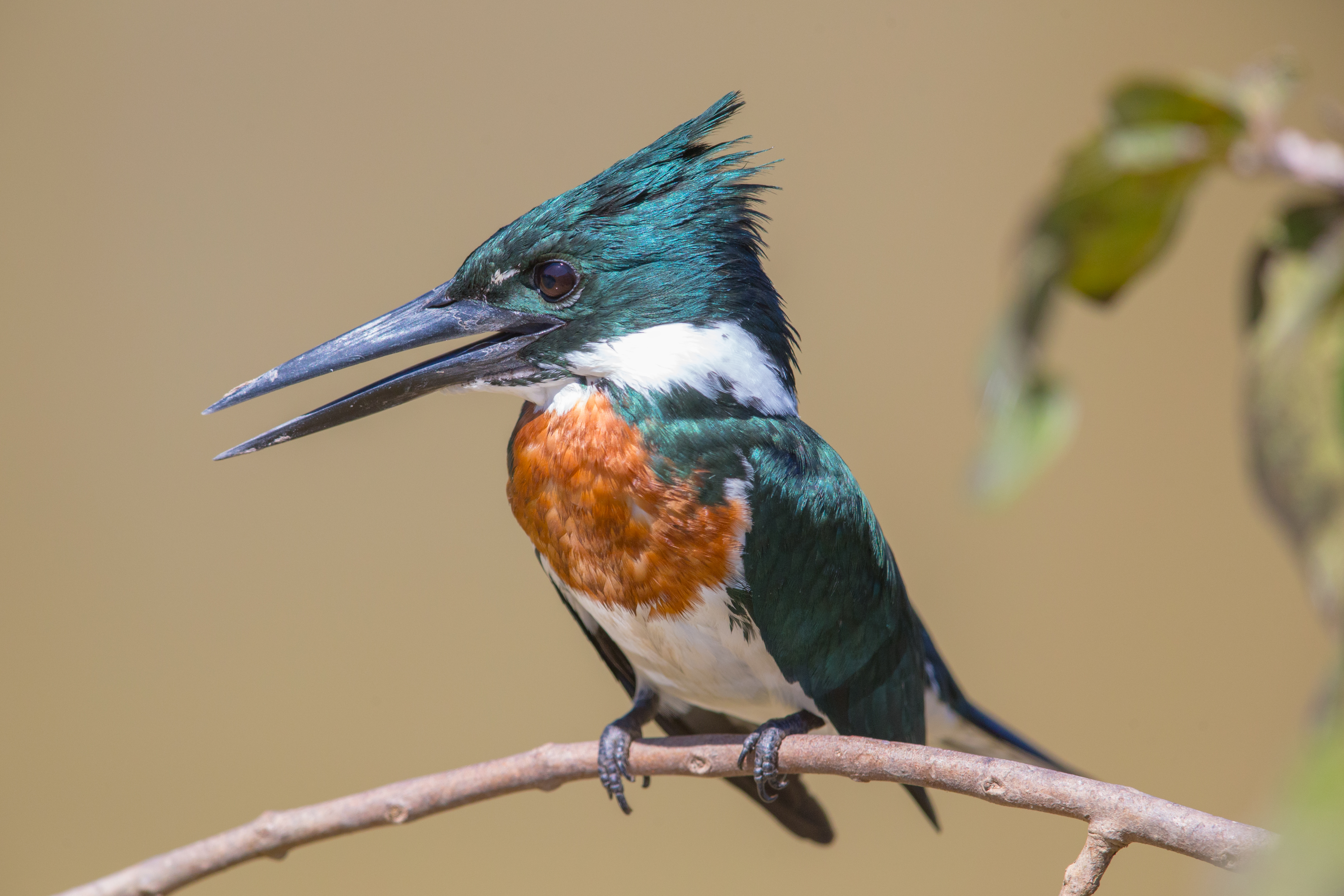
Amazon kingfisher

Order: Coraciiformes Family: Alcedinidae

Kingfishers are medium-sized birds with large heads, long pointed bills, short legs, and stubby tails.

- Ringed kingfisher, Megaceryle torquata
- Belted kingfisher, Megaceryle alcyon
- Amazon kingfisher, Chloroceryle amazona
- American pygmy kingfisher, Chloroceryle aenea
- Green kingfisher, Chloroceryle americana
- Green-and-rufous kingfisher, Chloroceryle inda

== Jacamars ==
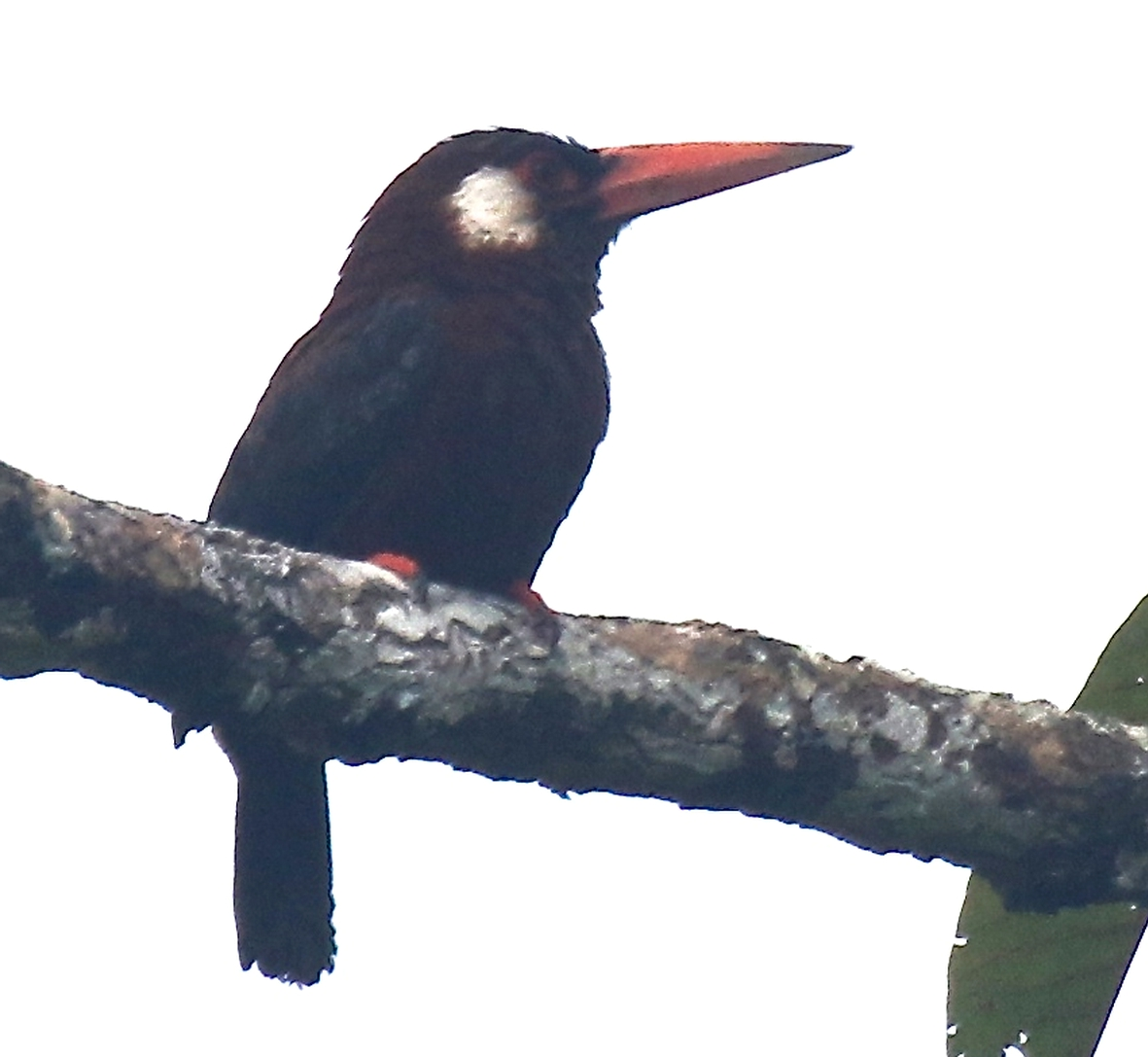
White-eared jacamar

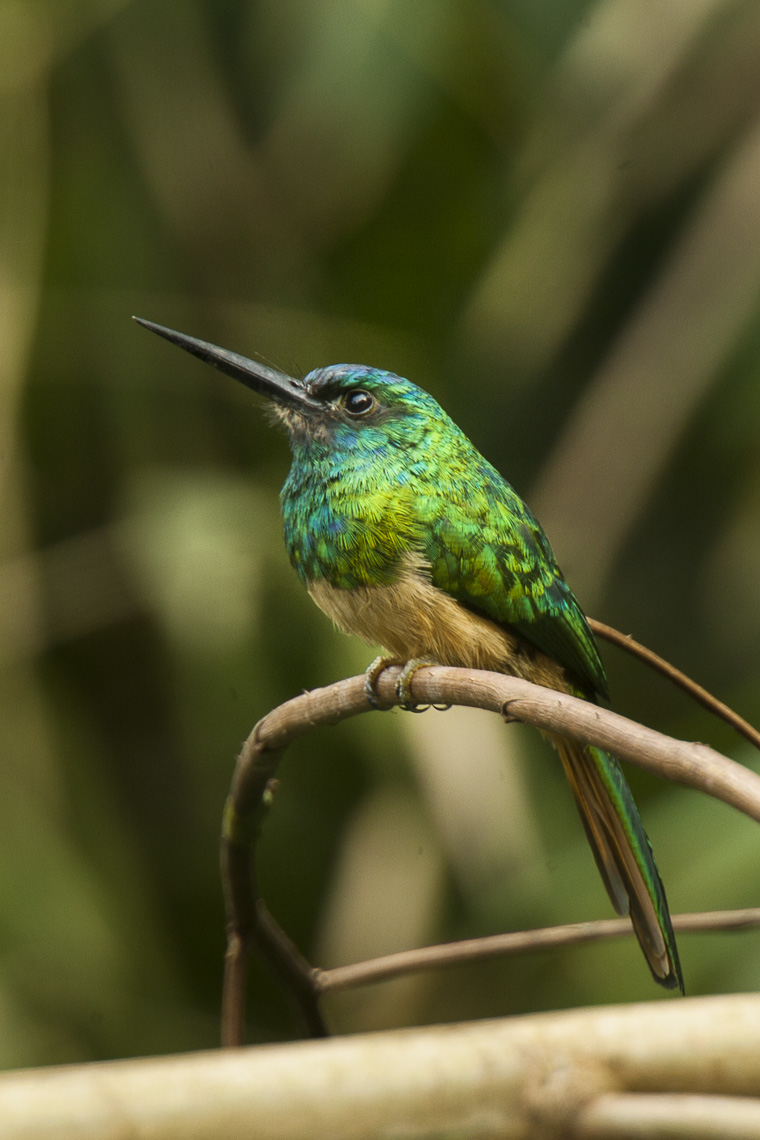
Bluish-fronted jacamar

Order: Galbuliformes Family: Galbulidae

Jacamars are near passerine birds from tropical South America with a range that extends up to Mexico. They feed on insects caught on the wing and are glossy, elegant birds with long bills and tails. They resemble the Old World bee-eaters, although they are more closely related to puffbirds.

- White-eared jacamar, Galbalcyrhynchus leucotis (E-SA)
- Purus jacamar, Galbalcyrhynchus purusianus (E-SA)
- White-throated jacamar, Brachygalba albogularis (E-SA)
- Brown jacamar, Brachygalba lugubris (E-SA)
- Pale-headed jacamar, Brachygalba goeringi (E-SA)
- Dusky-backed jacamar, Brachygalba salmoni
- Three-toed jacamar, Jacamaralcyon tridactyla (E-BR)
- Yellow-billed jacamar, Galbula albirostris (E-SA)
- Blue-cheeked jacamar, Galbula cyanicollis (E-SA)
- Rufous-tailed jacamar, Galbula ruficauda
- Green-tailed jacamar, Galbula galbula (E-SA)
- White-chinned jacamar, Galbula tombacea (E-SA)
- Bluish-fronted jacamar, Galbula cyanescens (E-SA)
- Coppery-chested jacamar, Galbula pastazae (E-SA)
- Purplish jacamar, Galbula chalcothorax (E-SA)
- Bronzy jacamar, Galbula leucogastra (E-SA)
- Paradise jacamar, Galbula dea (E-SA)
- Great jacamar, Jacamerops aureus

== Puffbirds ==
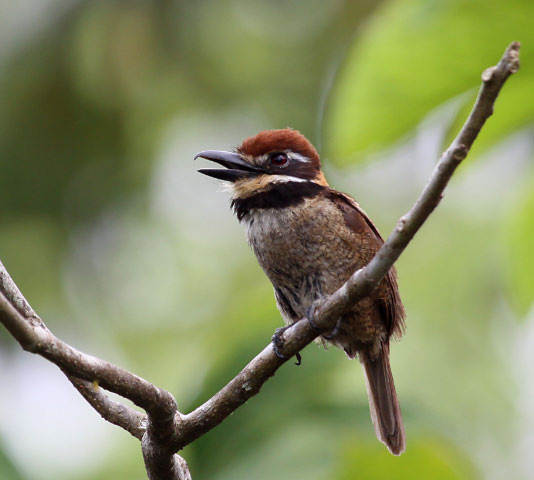
Chestnut-capped puffbird

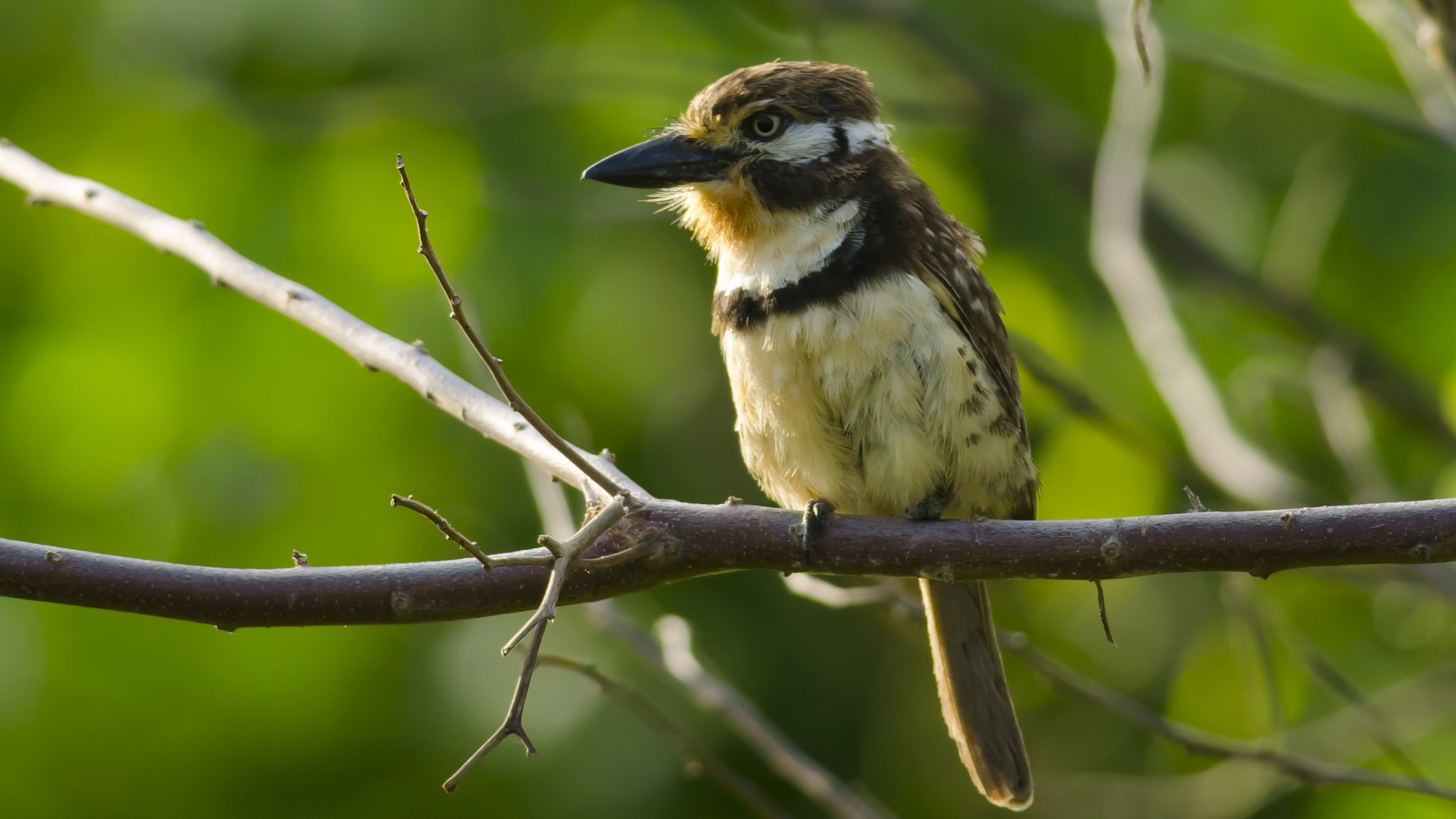
Russet-throated puffbird

Order: Galbuliformes Family: Bucconidae

Puffbirds are related to jacamars and have the same range, but lack the iridescent colors of that family. They are mainly brown, rufous, or gray, with large heads and flattened bills with hooked tips. The loose abundant plumage and short tails makes them look stout and puffy, giving rise to the English common name of the family.

- White-necked puffbird, Notharchus hyperrhynchus
- Guianan puffbird, Notharchus macrorhynchos (E-SA)
- Buff-bellied puffbird, Notharchus swainsoni (E-SA)
- Black-breasted puffbird, Notharchus pectoralis
- Brown-banded puffbird, Notharchus ordii (E-SA)
- Pied puffbird, Notharchus tectus
- Chestnut-capped puffbird, Bucco macrodactylus (E-SA)
- Spotted puffbird, Bucco tamatia (E-SA)
- Sooty-capped puffbird, Bucco noanamae (E-CO)
- Collared puffbird, Bucco capensis (E-SA)
- Barred puffbird, Nystalus radiatus
- Western striolated-puffbird, Nystalus obamai (E-SA)
- Eastern striolated-puffbird, Nystalus striolatus (E-SA)
- White-eared puffbird, Nystalus chacuru (E-SA)
- Spot-backed puffbird, Nystalus maculatus (E-SA)
- Russet-throated puffbird, Hypnelus ruficollis (E-SA)
- White-chested puffbird, Malacoptila fusca (E-SA)
- Semicollared puffbird, Malacoptila semicincta (E-SA)
- Crescent-chested puffbird, Malacoptila striata (E-BR)
- Rufous-necked puffbird, Malacoptila rufa (E-SA)
- White-whiskered puffbird, Malacoptila panamensis
- Black-streaked puffbird, Malacoptila fulvogularis (E-SA)
- Moustached puffbird, Malacoptila mystacalis (E-SA)
- Lanceolated monklet, Micromonacha lanceolata
- Rusty-breasted nunlet, Nonnula rubecula (E-SA)
- Fulvous-chinned nunlet, Nonnula sclateri (E-SA)
- Brown nunlet, Nonnula brunnea (E-SA)
- Gray-cheeked nunlet, Nonnula frontalis
- Rufous-capped nunlet, Nonnula ruficapilla (E-SA)
- Chestnut-headed nunlet, Nonnula amaurocephala (E-BR)
- White-faced nunbird, Hapaloptila castanea (E-SA)
- Black nunbird, Monasa atra (E-SA)
- Black-fronted nunbird, Monasa nigrifrons (E-SA)
- White-fronted nunbird, Monasa morphoeus
- Yellow-billed nunbird, Monasa flavirostris (E-SA)
- Swallow-winged puffbird, Chelidoptera tenebrosa (E-SA)

== New World barbets ==
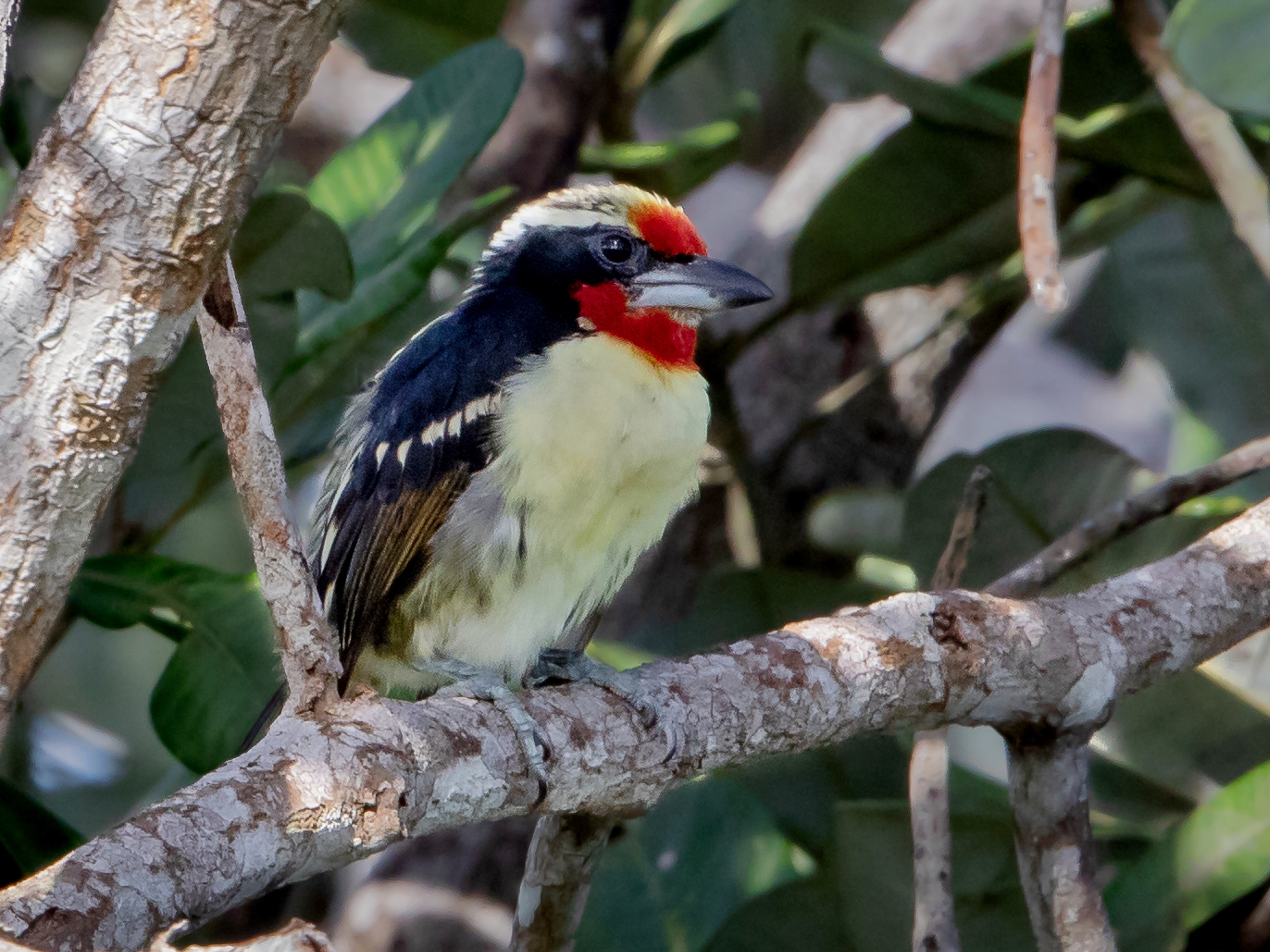
Black-spotted barbet

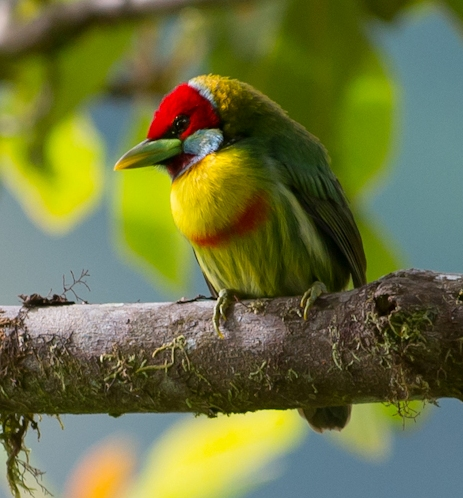
Versicolored barbet

Order: Piciformes Family: Capitonidae

Barbets are plump birds, with short necks and large heads. They get their name from the bristles which fringe their heavy bills. Most species are brightly colored.

- Scarlet-crowned barbet, Capito aurovirens (E-SA)
- Black-girdled barbet, Capito dayi (E-SA)
- Spot-crowned barbet, Capito maculicoronatus
- Orange-fronted barbet, Capito squamatus (E-SA)
- White-mantled barbet, Capito hypoleucus (E-CO)
- Scarlet-banded barbet, Capito wallacei (E-PE)
- Five-colored barbet, Capito quinticolor (E-SA)
- Brown-chested barbet, Capito brunneipectus (E-BR)
- Black-spotted barbet, Capito niger (E-SA)
- Gilded barbet, Capito auratus (E-SA)
- Lemon-throated barbet, Eubucco richardsoni (E-SA)
- Scarlet-hooded barbet, Eubucco tucinkae (E-SA)
- Red-headed barbet, Eubucco bourcierii
- Versicolored barbet, Eubucco versicolor (E-SA)

== Toucan barbet ==
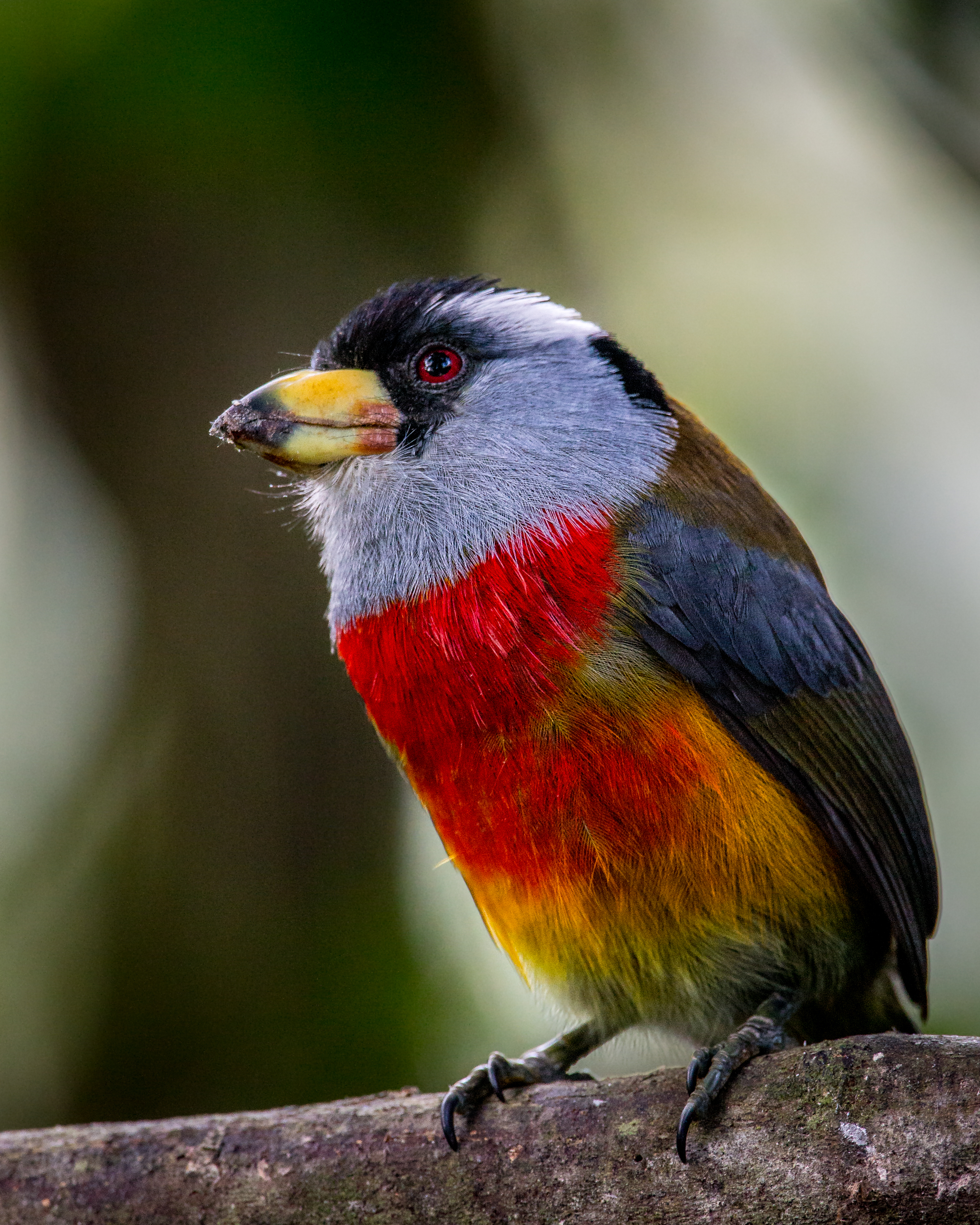
Toucan barbet

Order: Piciformes Family: Semnornithidae

Toucan barbets are birds of montane forests in the Neotropics. They are highly social and non-migratory.

- Toucan barbet, Semnornis ramphastinus (E-SA)

== Toucans ==
Order: Piciformes Family: Ramphastidae

Toucans are near passerine birds from the Neotropics. They are brightly marked and have enormous, colorful bills which in some species amount to half their body length.

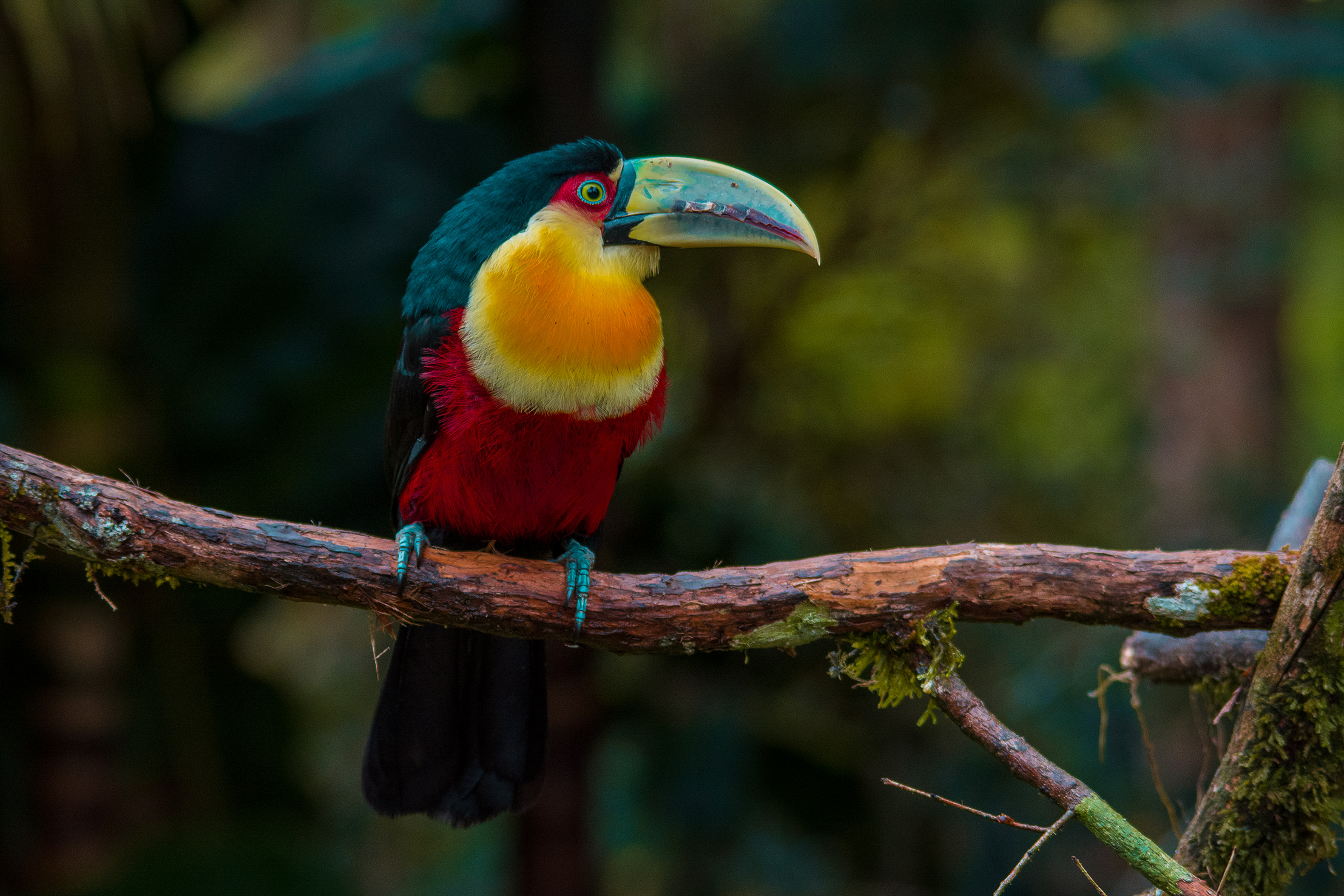
Red-breasted toucan

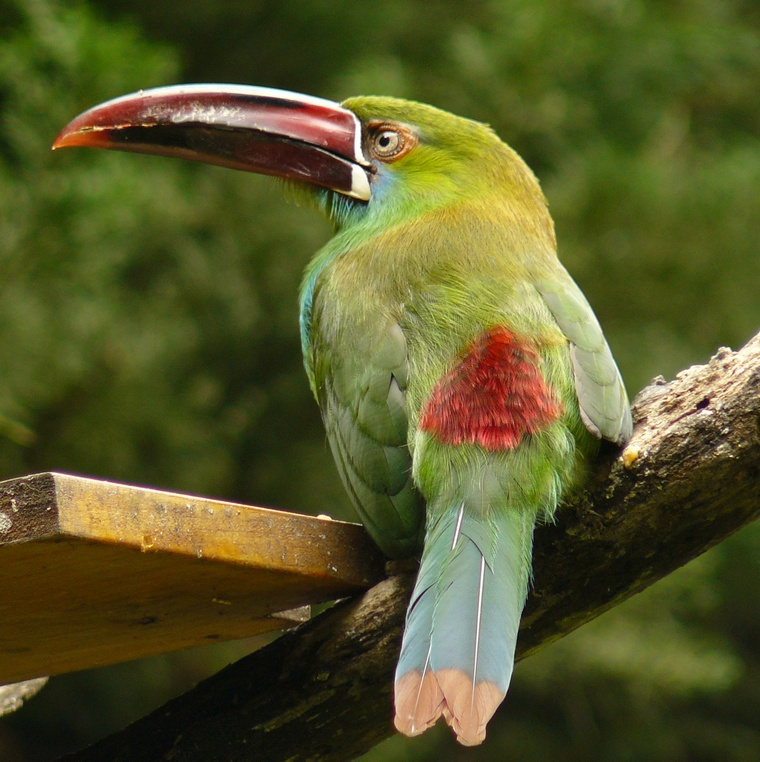
Crimson-rumped toucanet

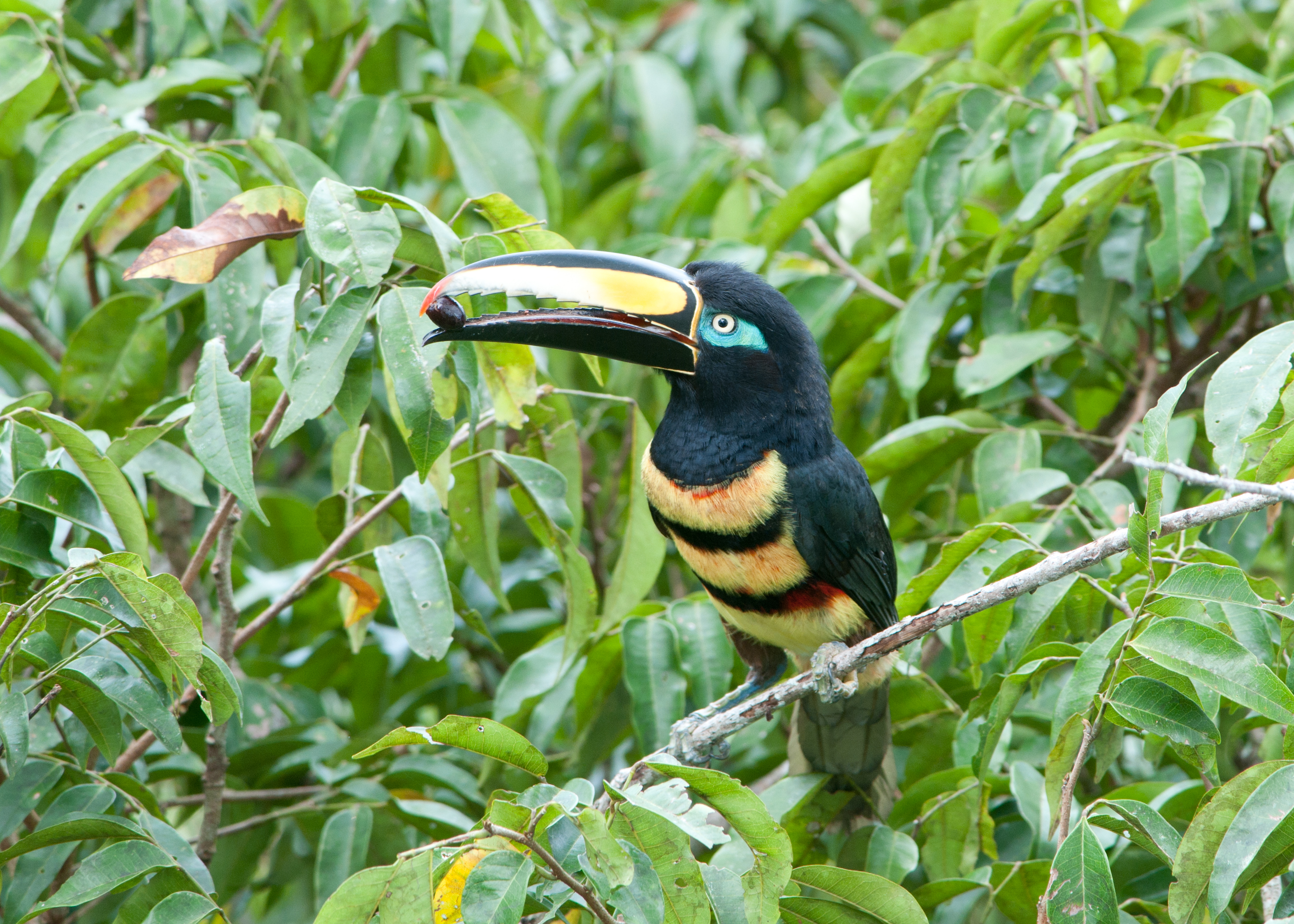
Many-banded aracari
- Toco toucan, Ramphastos toco (E-SA)
- Yellow-throated toucan, Ramphastos ambiguus
- White-throated toucan, Ramphastos tucanus (E-SA)
- Keel-billed toucan, Ramphastos sulfuratus
- Choco toucan, Ramphastos brevis
- Channel-billed toucan, Ramphastos vitellinus
- Red-breasted toucan, Ramphastos dicolorus (E-SA)
- Southern emerald-toucanet, Aulacorhynchus albivitta (E-SA)
- Groove-billed toucanet, Aulacorhynchus sulcatus (E-SA)
- Chestnut-tipped toucanet, Aulacorhynchus derbianus (E-SA)
- Tepui toucanet, Aulacorhynchus whitelianus (E-SA)
- Crimson-rumped toucanet, Aulacorhynchus haematopygus (E-SA)
- Yellow-browed toucanet, Aulacorhynchus huallagae (E-PE)
- Blue-banded toucanet, Aulacorhynchus coeruleicinctis (E-SA)
- Gray-breasted mountain-toucan, Andigena hypoglauca (E-SA)
- Plate-billed mountain-toucan, Andigena laminirostris (E-SA)
- Hooded mountain-toucan, Andigena cucullata (E-SA)
- Black-billed mountain-toucan, Andigena nigrirostris (E-SA)
- Yellow-eared toucanet, Selenidera spectabilis
- Guianan toucanet, Selenidera piperivora (E-SA)
- Golden-collared toucanet, Selenidera reinwardtii (E-SA)
- Tawny-tufted toucanet, Selenidera nattereri (E-SA)
- Gould's toucanet, Selenidera gouldii (E-SA)
- Spot-billed toucanet, Selenidera maculirostris (E-SA)
- Saffron toucanet, Pteroglossus bailloni (E-SA)
- Green aracari, Pteroglossus viridis (E-SA)
- Lettered aracari, Pteroglossus inscriptus (E-SA)
- Collared aracari, Pteroglossus torquatus
- Black-necked aracari, Pteroglossus aracari (E-SA)
- Chestnut-eared aracari, Pteroglossus castanotis (E-SA)
- Many-banded aracari, Pteroglossus pluricinctus (E-SA)
- Ivory-billed aracari, Pteroglossus azara (E-SA)
- Curl-crested aracari, Pteroglossus beauharnaisii (E-SA)
- Red-necked aracari, Pteroglossus bitorquatus (E-SA)

== Woodpeckers ==
Order: Piciformes Family: Picidae

Woodpeckers are small to medium-sized birds with chisel-like beaks, short legs, stiff tails, and long tongues used for capturing insects. Some species have feet with two toes pointing forward and two backward, while several species have only three toes. Many woodpeckers have the habit of tapping noisily on tree trunks with their beaks.

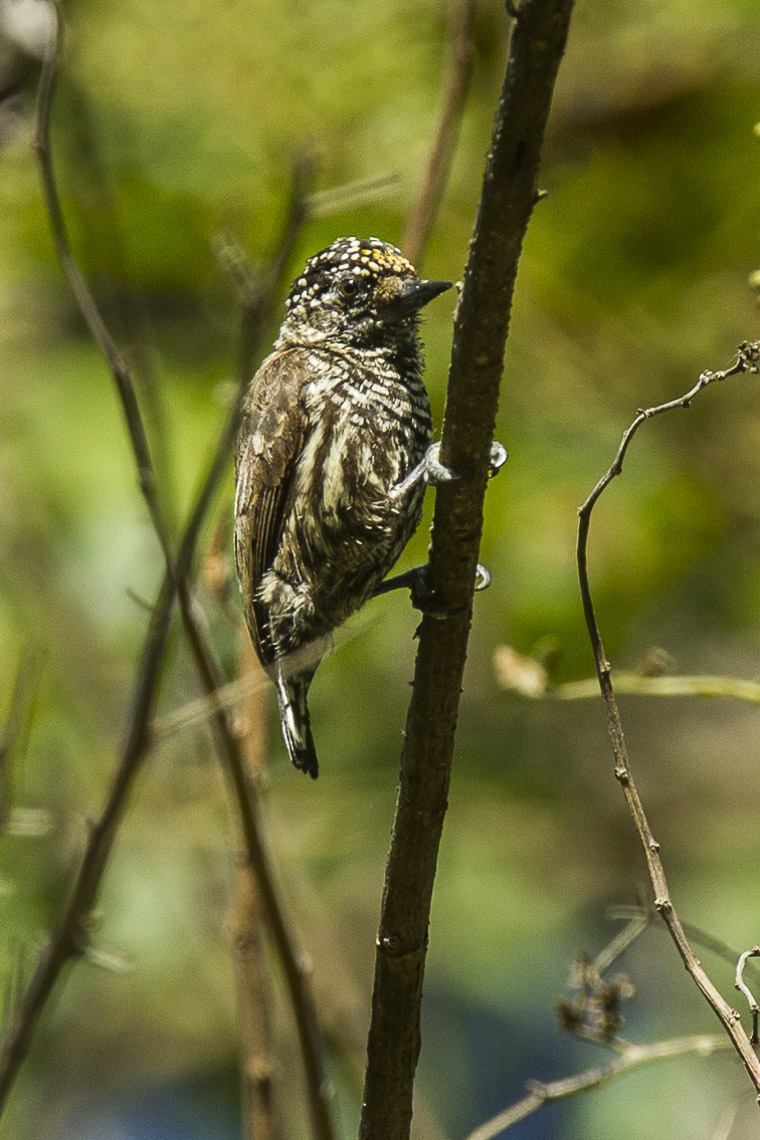
Ecuadorian piculet

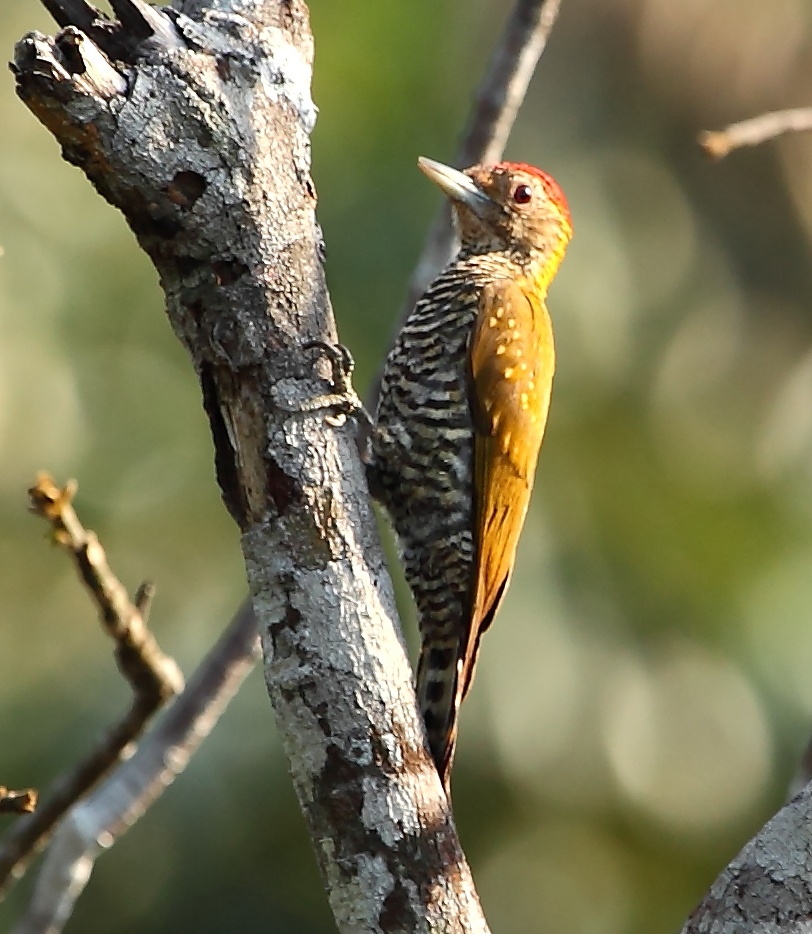
Golden-collared woodpecker

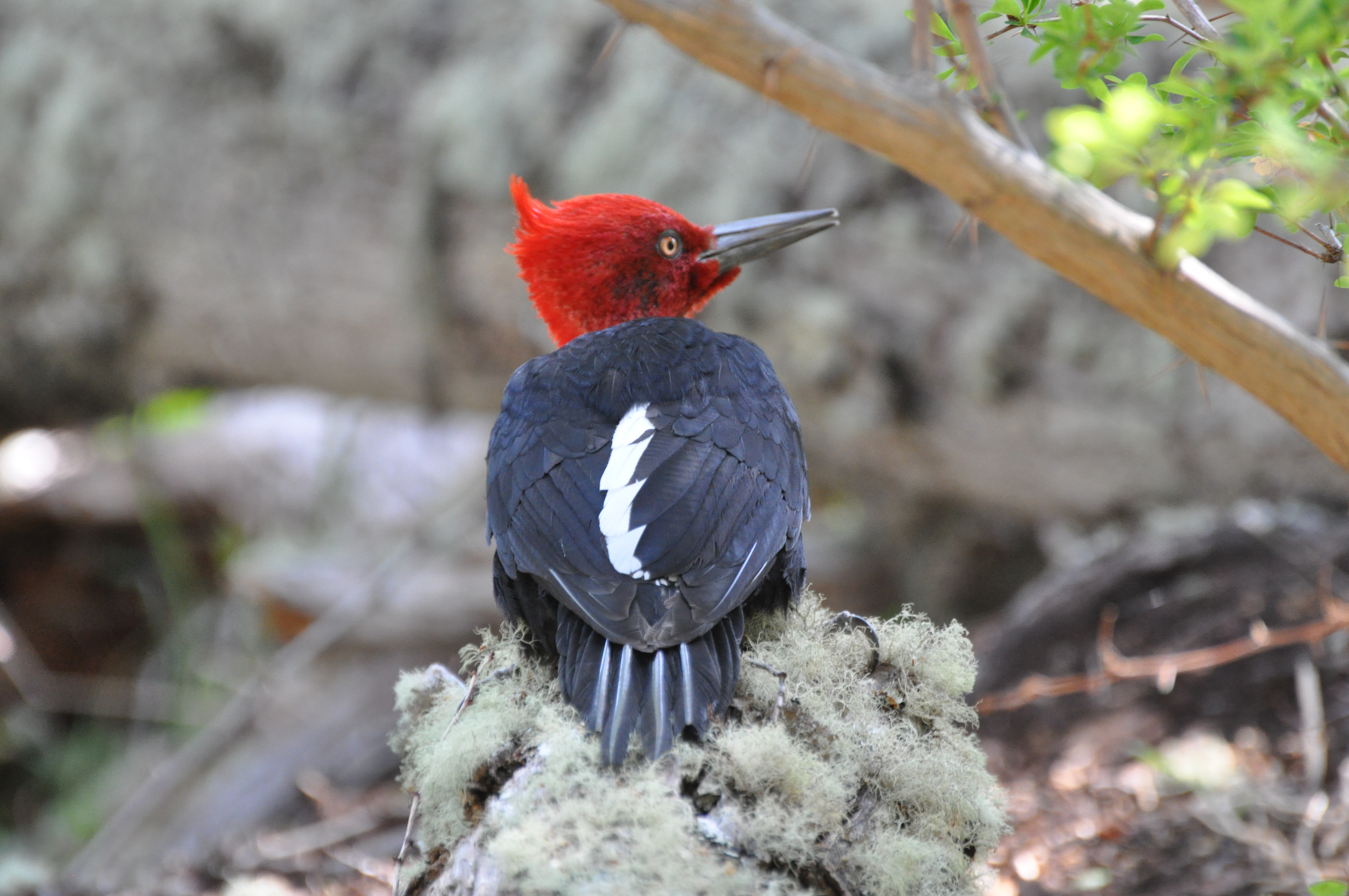
Magellanic woodpecker

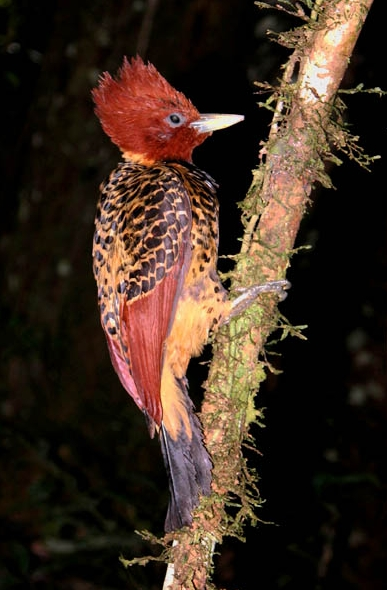
Rufous-headed woodpecker

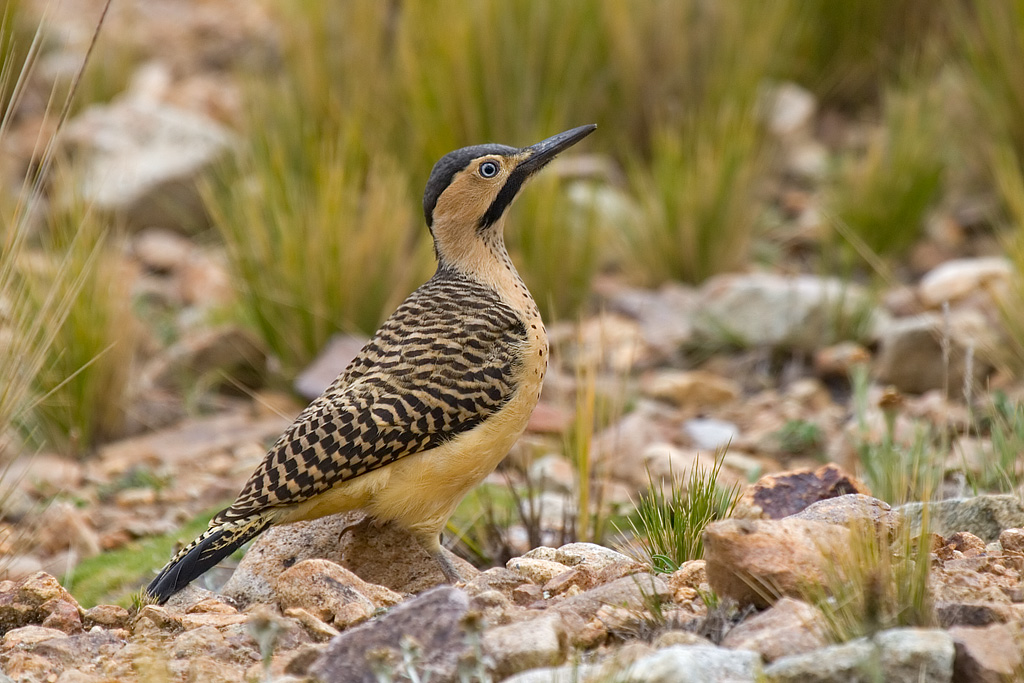
Andean flicker
- Bar-breasted piculet, Picumnus aurifrons (E-SA)
- Orinoco piculet, Picumnus pumilus (E-SA)
- Lafresnaye's piculet, Picumnus lafresnayi (E-SA)
- Golden-spangled piculet, Picumnus exilis (E-SA)
- Ecuadorian piculet, Picumnus sclateri (E-SA)
- Scaled piculet, Picumnus squamulatus (E-SA)
- White-bellied piculet, Picumnus spilogaster (E-SA)
- Ochraceous piculet, Picumnus limae (E-BR)
- Arrowhead piculet, Picumnus minutissimus (E-SU)
- Spotted piculet, Picumnus pygmaeus (E-BR)
- Speckle-chested piculet, Picumnus steindachneri (E-PE)
- Varzea piculet, Picumnus varzeae (E-BR)
- White-barred piculet, Picumnus cirratus (E-SA)
- Ocellated piculet, Picumnus dorbignyanus (E-SA)
- Ochre-collared piculet, Picumnus temminckii (E-SA)
- White-wedged piculet, Picumnus albosquamatus (E-SA)
- Rusty-necked piculet, Picumnus fuscus (E-SA)
- Rufous-breasted piculet, Picumnus rufiventris (E-SA)
- Mottled piculet, Picumnus nebulosus (E-SA)
- Plain-breasted piculet, Picumnus castelnau (E-SA)
- Fine-barred piculet, Picumnus subtilis (E-SA)
- Olivaceous piculet, Picumnus olivaceus
- Grayish piculet, Picumnus granadensis (E-CO)
- Chestnut piculet, Picumnus cinnamomeus (E-SA)
- Yellow-bellied sapsucker, Sphyrapicus varius (V)
- White woodpecker, Melanerpes candidus (E-SA)
- Acorn woodpecker, Melanerpes formicivorus
- Yellow-tufted woodpecker, Melanerpes cruentatus (E-SA)
- Yellow-fronted woodpecker, Melanerpes flavifrons (E-SA)
- Beautiful woodpecker, Melanerpes pulcher (E-CO)
- Black-cheeked woodpecker, Melanerpes pucherani
- White-fronted woodpecker, Melanerpes cactorum (E-SA)
- Red-crowned woodpecker, Melanerpes rubricapillus
- Smoky-brown woodpecker, Dryobates fumigatus
- Red-rumped woodpecker, Dryobates kirkii
- Golden-collared woodpecker, Dryobates cassini (E-SA)
- White-spotted woodpecker, Dryobates spilogaster (E-SA)
- Checkered woodpecker, Dryobates mixtus (E-SA)
- Striped woodpecker, Dryobates lignarius (E-SA)
- Blood-colored woodpecker, Dryobates sanguineus (E-SA)
- Little woodpecker, Dryobates passerinus (E-SA)
- Dot-fronted woodpecker, Dryobates frontalis (E-SA)
- Scarlet-backed woodpecker, Dryobates callonotus (E-SA)
- Yellow-vented woodpecker, Dryobates dignus (E-SA)
- Bar-bellied woodpecker, Dryobates nigriceps (E-SA)
- Red-stained woodpecker, Dryobates affinis (E-SA)
- Choco woodpecker, Dryobates chocoensis (E-SA)
- Yellow-eared woodpecker, Dryobates maculifrons (E-BR)
- Powerful woodpecker, Campephilus pollens (E-SA)
- Crimson-bellied woodpecker, Campephilus haematogaster
- Red-necked woodpecker, Campephilus rubricollis (E-SA)
- Robust woodpecker, Campephilus robustus (E-SA)
- Crimson-crested woodpecker, Campephilus melanoleucos
- Guayaquil woodpecker, Campephilus gayaquilensis (E-SA)
- Cream-backed woodpecker, Campephilus leucopogon (E-SA)
- Magellanic woodpecker, Campephilus magellanicus (E-SA)
- Lineated woodpecker, Dryocopus lineatus
- Black-bodied woodpecker, Dryocopus schulzi (E-SA)
- Cinnamon woodpecker, Celeus loricatus
- Ringed woodpecker, Celeus torquatus (E-SA)
- Helmeted woodpecker, Celeus galeatus (E-SA)
- Variable woodpecker, Celeus undatus (E-SA)
- Cream-colored woodpecker, Celeus flavus (E-SA)
- Rufous-headed woodpecker, Celeus spectabilis (E-SA)
- Kaempfer's woodpecker, Celeus obrieni (E-BR)
- Ochre-backed woodpecker, Celeus ochraceus (E-BR)
- Chestnut woodpecker, Celeus elegans (E-SA)
- Pale-crested woodpecker, Celeus lugubris (E-SA)
- Blond-crested woodpecker, Celeus flavescens (E-SA)
- White-throated woodpecker, Piculus leucolaemus (E-SA)
- Lita woodpecker, Piculus litae (E-SA)
- Yellow-throated woodpecker, Piculus flavigula (E-SA)
- Golden-green woodpecker, Piculus chrysochloros
- White-browed woodpecker, Piculus aurulentus (E-SA)
- Golden-olive woodpecker, Colaptes rubiginosus
- Crimson-mantled woodpecker, Colaptes rivolii (E-SA)
- Black-necked woodpecker, Colaptes atricollis (E-PE)
- Spot-breasted woodpecker, Colaptes punctigula
- Green-barred woodpecker, Colaptes melanochloros (E-SA)
- Chilean flicker, Colaptes pitius (E-SA)
- Andean flicker, Colaptes rupicola (E-SA)
- Campo flicker, Colaptes campestris (E-SA)

== Seriemas ==
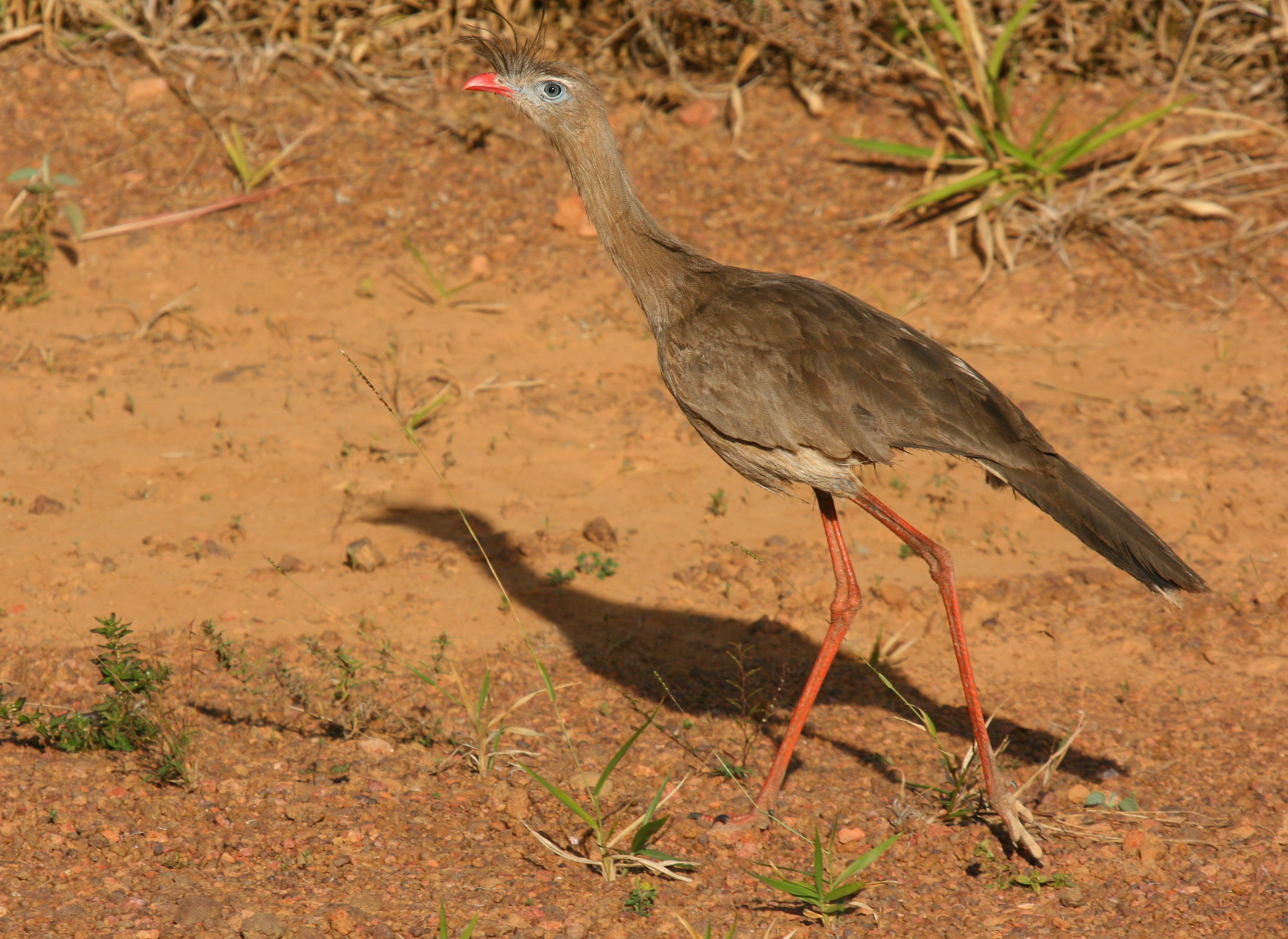
Red-legged seriema

Order: Cariamiformes Family: Cariamidae

Seriemas are terrestrial birds which run rather than fly (though they are able to fly for short distances). They have long legs, necks and tails, but only short wings, reflecting their way of life. They are brownish birds with short bills and erectile crests, found on fairly-dry open grasslands.

- Red-legged seriema, Cariama cristata (E-SA)
- Black-legged seriema, Chunga burmeisteri (E-SA)

== Falcons ==
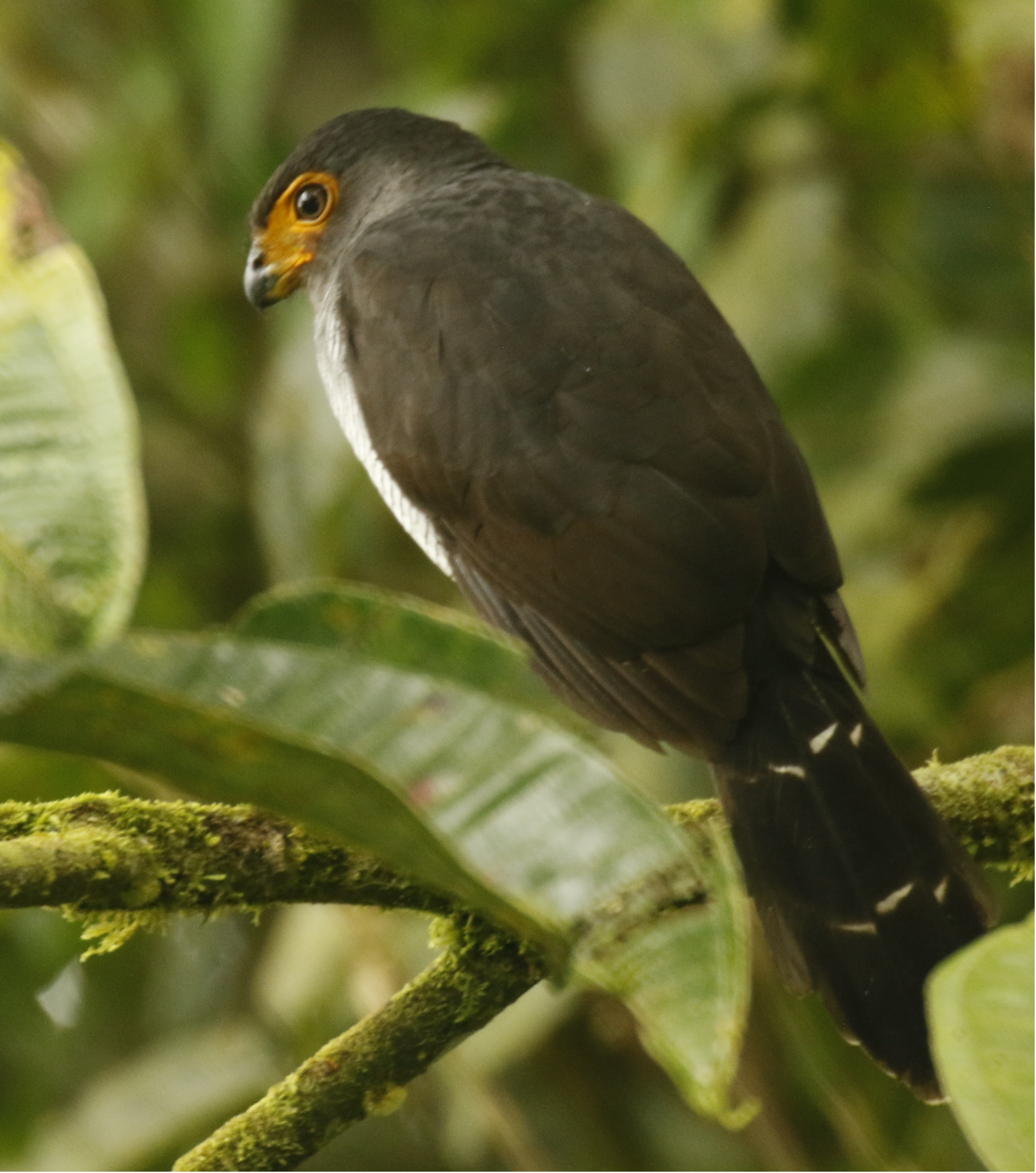
Lined forest-falcon

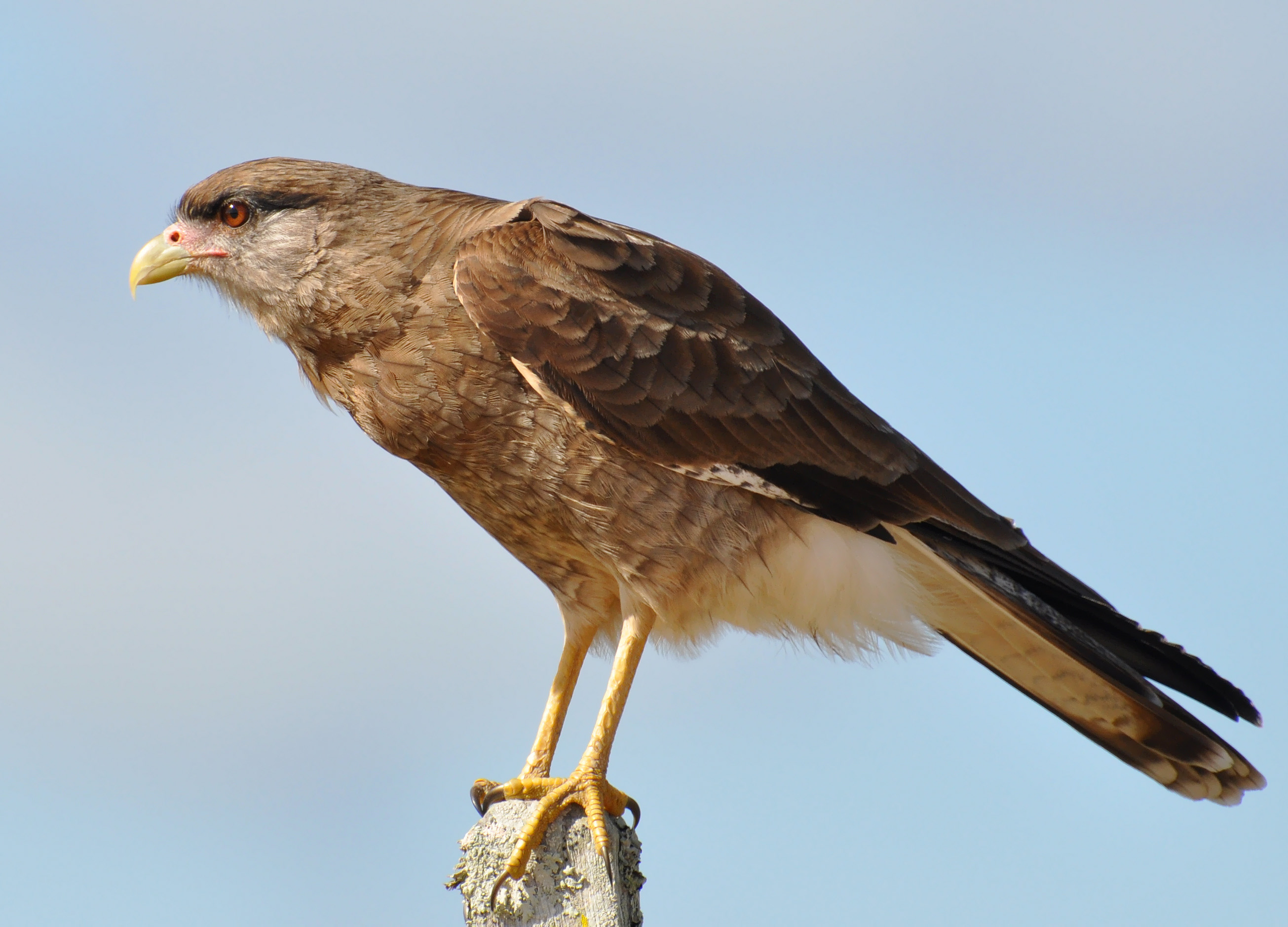
Chimango caracara

Order: Falconiformes Family: Falconidae

Falconidae is a family of diurnal birds of prey. They differ from hawks, eagles and kites in that they kill with their beaks instead of their talons.

- Laughing falcon, Herpetotheres cachinnans
- Barred forest-falcon, Micrastur ruficollis
- Plumbeous forest-falcon, Micrastur plumbeus (E-SA)
- Lined forest-falcon, Micrastur gilvicollis (E-SA)
- Cryptic forest-falcon, Micrastur mintoni (E-SA)
- Slaty-backed forest-falcon, Micrastur mirandollei
- Collared forest-falcon, Micrastur semitorquatus
- Buckley's forest-falcon, Micrastur buckleyi (E-SA)
- Spot-winged falconet, Spiziapteryx circumcincta (E-SA)
- Crested caracara, Caracara plancus (All)
- Red-throated caracara, Ibycter americanus
- Carunculated caracara, Phalcoboenus carunculatus (E-SA)
- Mountain caracara, Phalcoboenus megalopterus (E-SA)
- White-throated caracara, Phalcoboenus albogularis (E-SA)
- Striated caracara, Phalcoboenus australis (E-SA)
- Black caracara, Daptrius ater (E-SA)
- Yellow-headed caracara, Milvago chimachima
- Chimango caracara, Milvago chimango (E-SA)
- Eurasian kestrel, Falco tinnunculus (V)
- American kestrel, Falco sparverius
- Merlin, Falco columbarius
- Eurasian hobby, Falco subbuteo (UC) (V, not on the SACC list)
- Bat falcon, Falco rufigularis
- Orange-breasted falcon, Falco deiroleucus
- Aplomado falcon, Falco femoralis
- Peregrine falcon, Falco peregrinus (All)

== Old World parrots ==
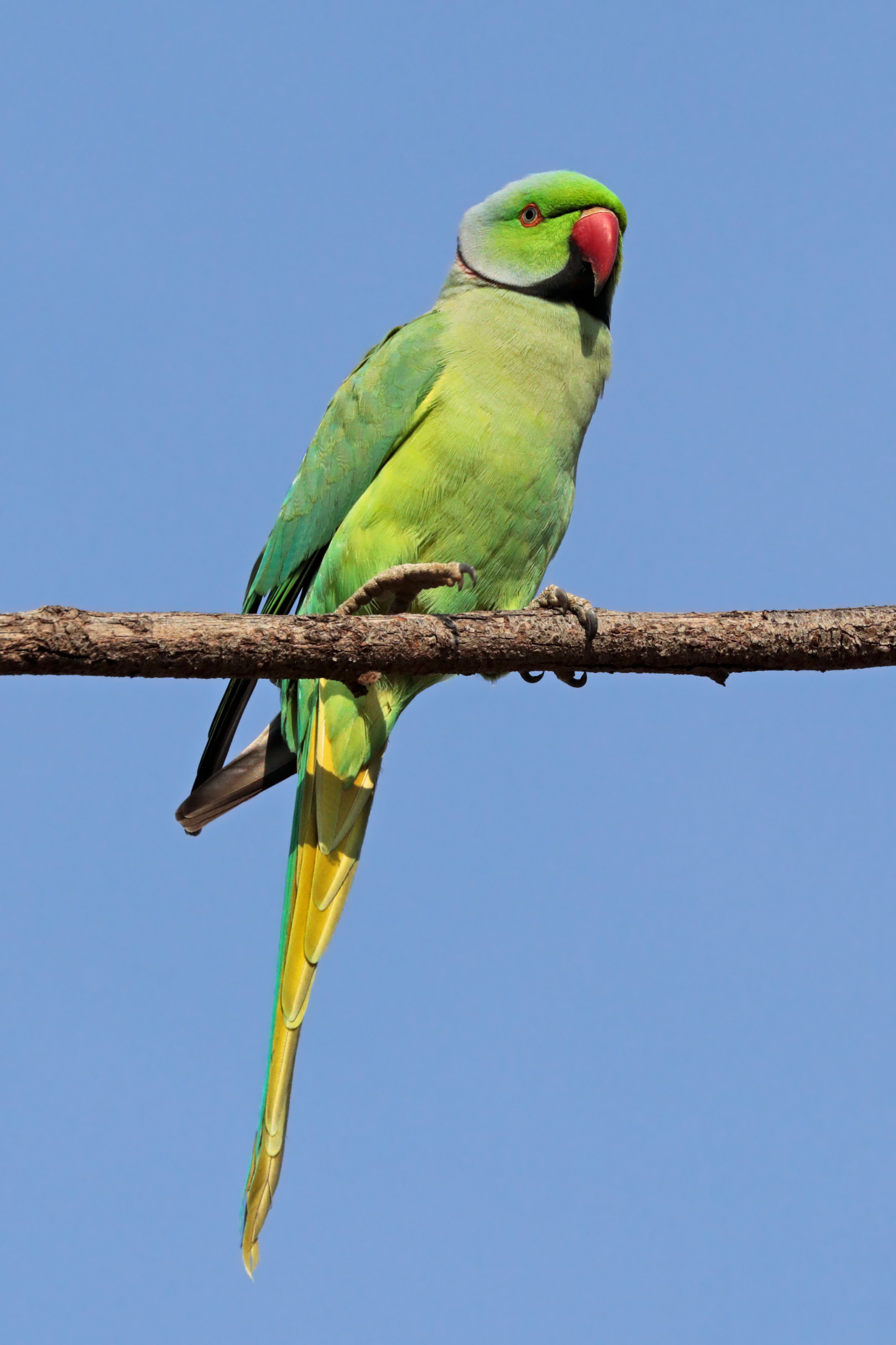
Rose-ringed parakeet

Order: Psittaciformes Family: Psittaculidae

Characteristic features of parrots include a strong curved bill, an upright stance, strong legs, and clawed zygodactyl feet. Many parrots are vividly colored, and some are multi-colored. In size they range from 8 cm (3.1 in) to 1 m (3.3 ft) in length. Old World parrots are found from Africa east across south and southeast Asia and Oceania to Australia and New Zealand.

- Rose-ringed parakeet, Psittacula krameri (I)

== New World and African parrots ==
Order: Psittaciformes Family: Psittacidae

Parrots are small to large birds with a characteristic curved beak. Their upper mandibles have slight mobility in the joint with the skull and they have a generally erect stance. All parrots are zygodactyl, having the four toes on each foot placed two at the front and two to the back.

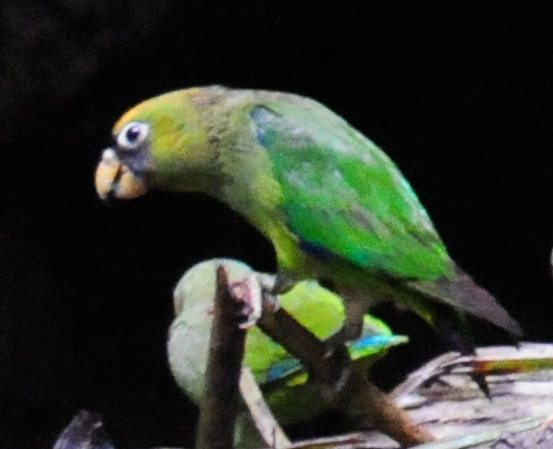
Scarlet-shouldered parrotlet

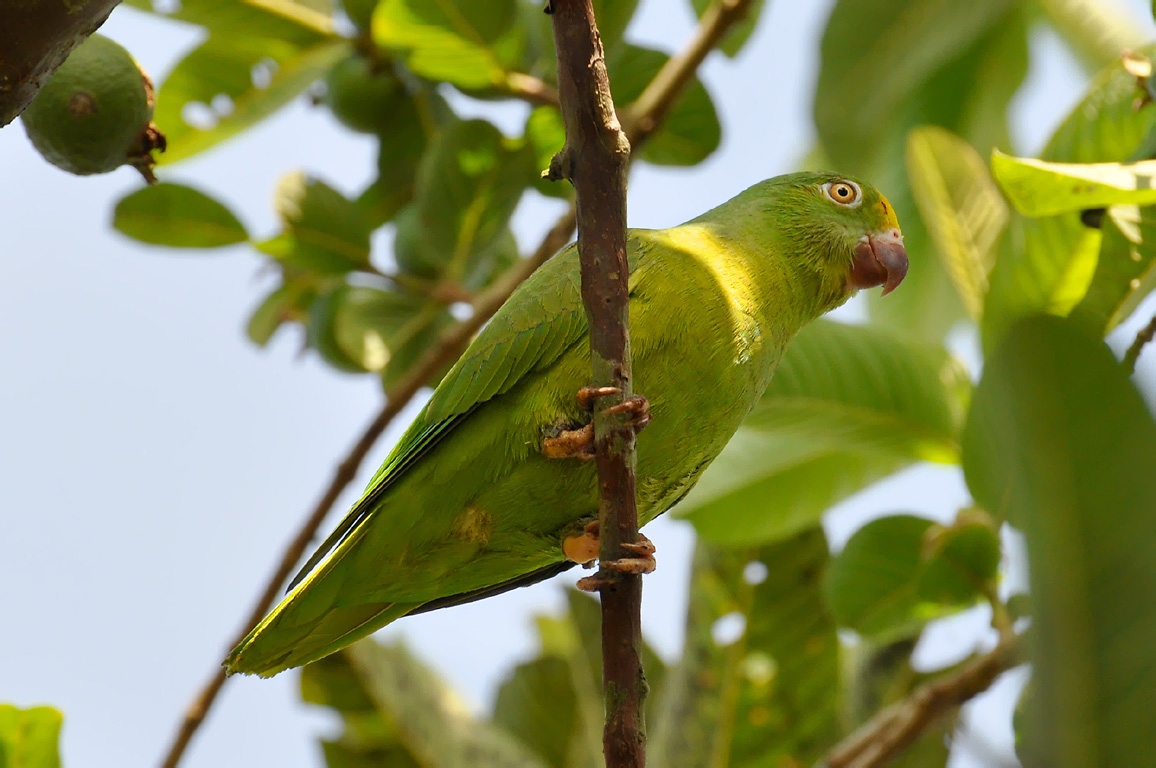
Tui parakeet

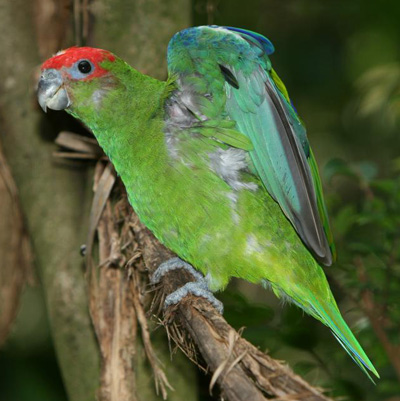
Pileated parrot

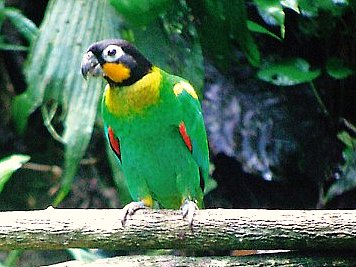
Orange-cheeked parrot

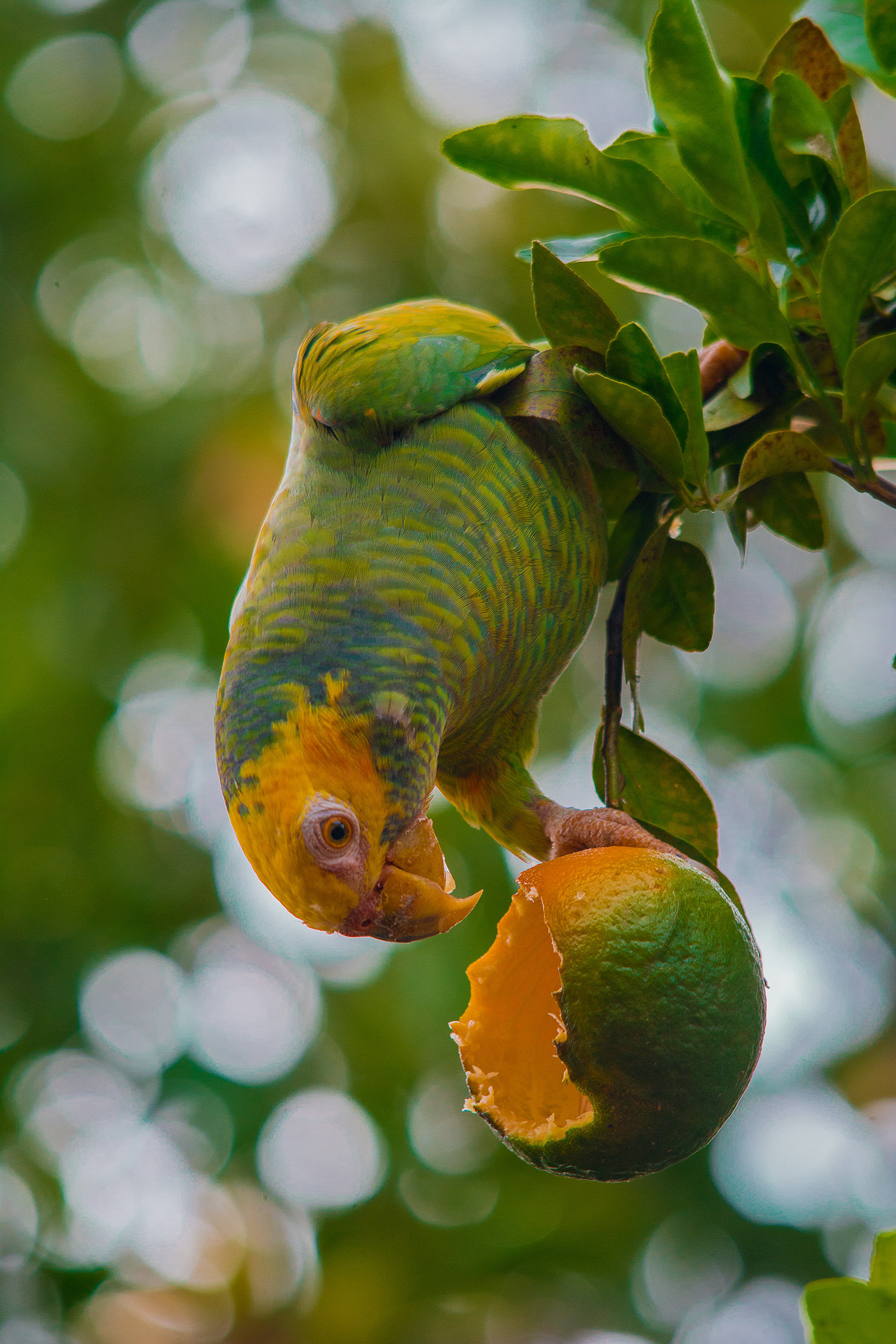
Yellow-faced parrot

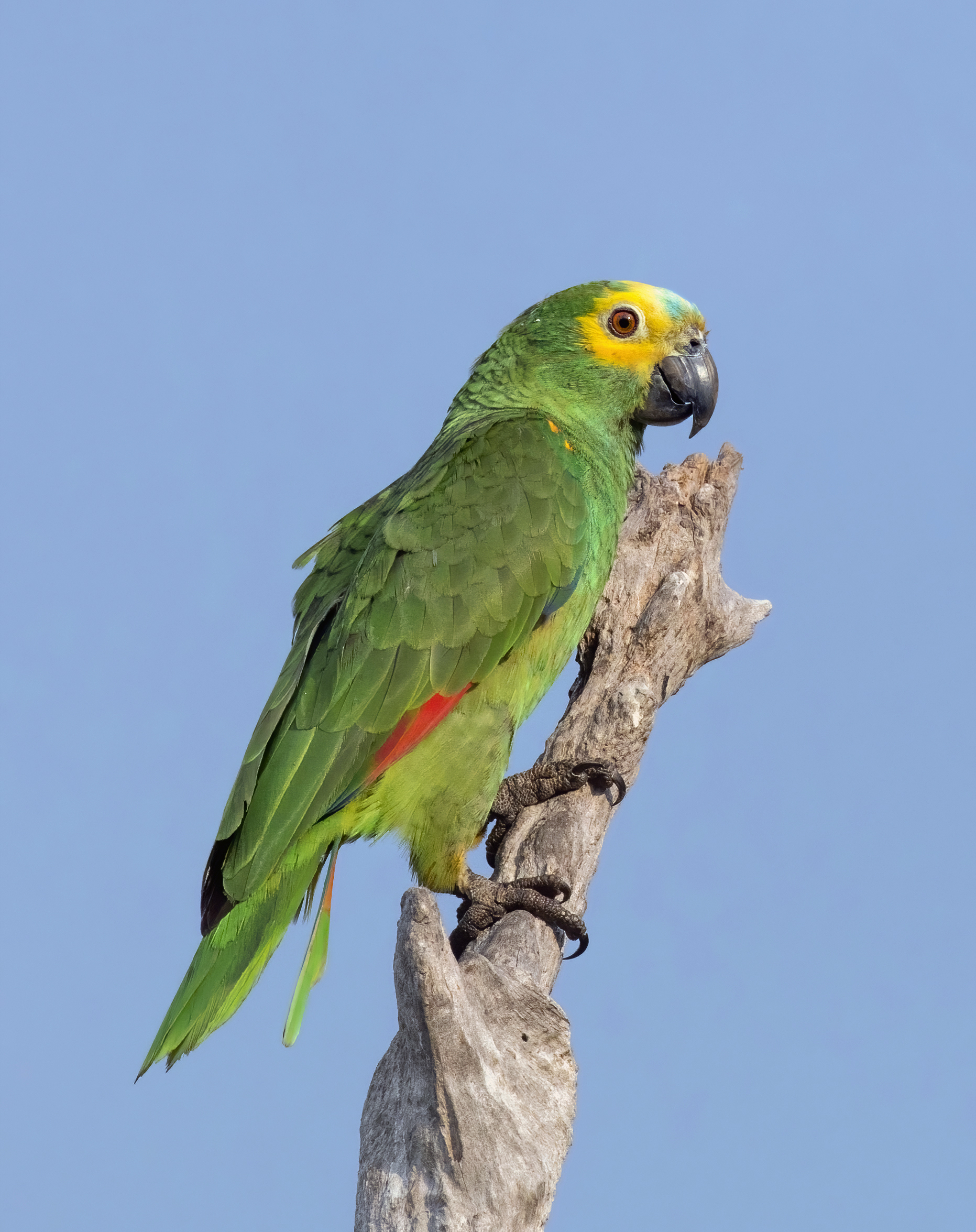
Turquoise-fronted parrot

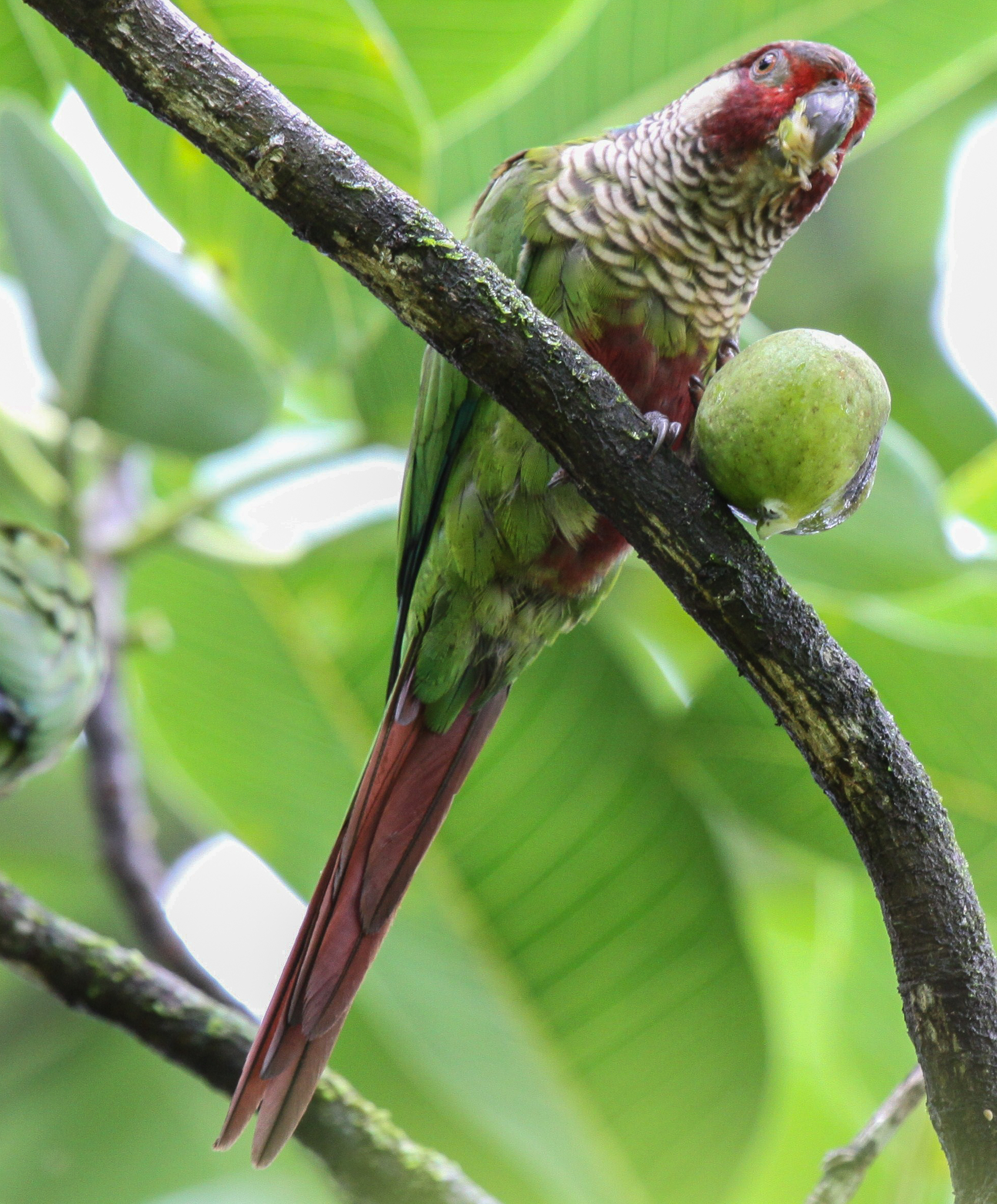
Painted parakeet

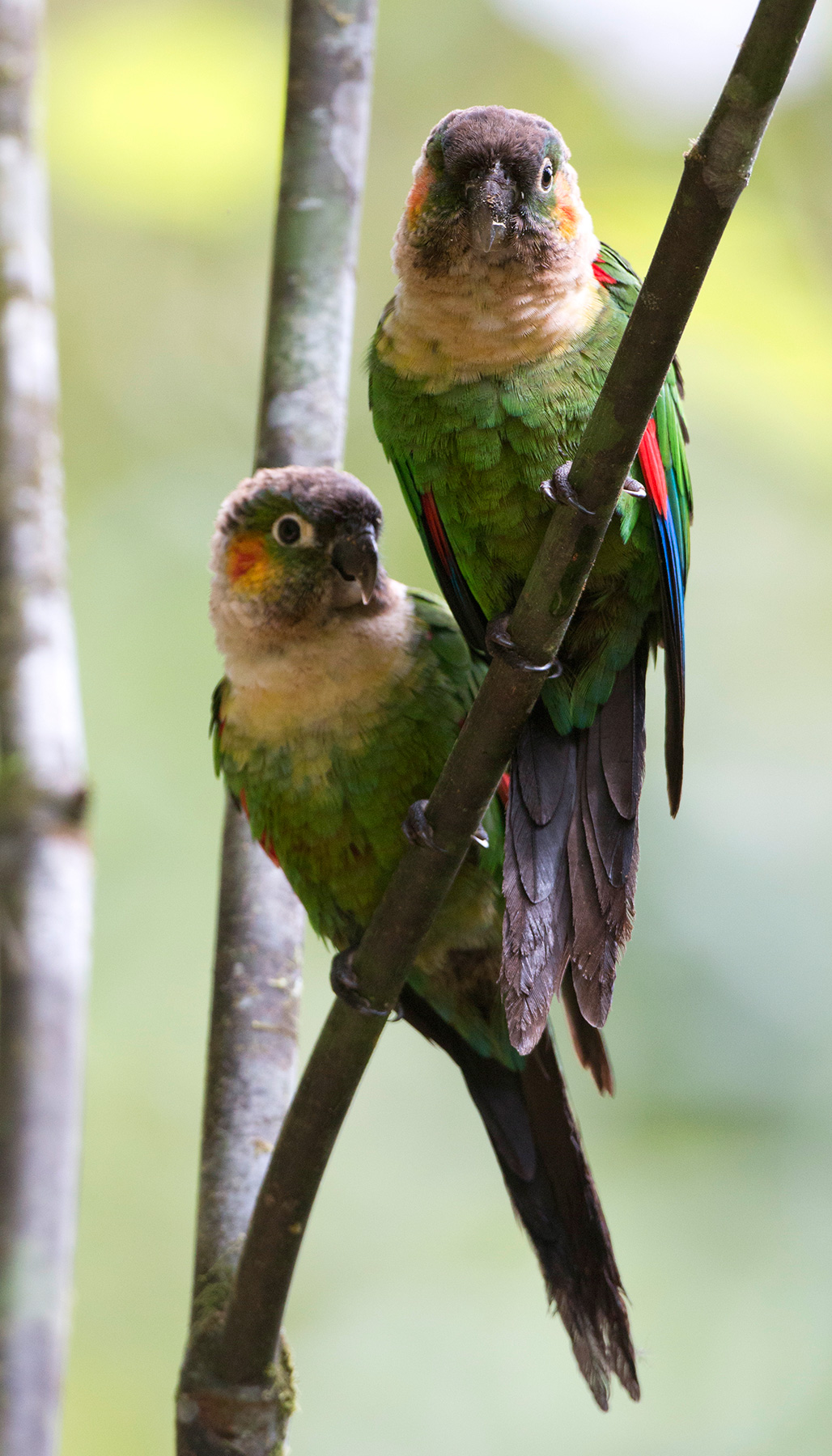
White-breasted parakeets

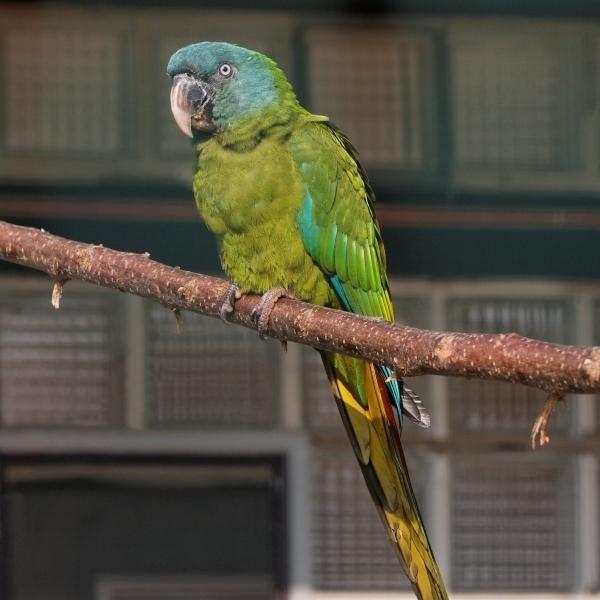
Blue-headed macaw

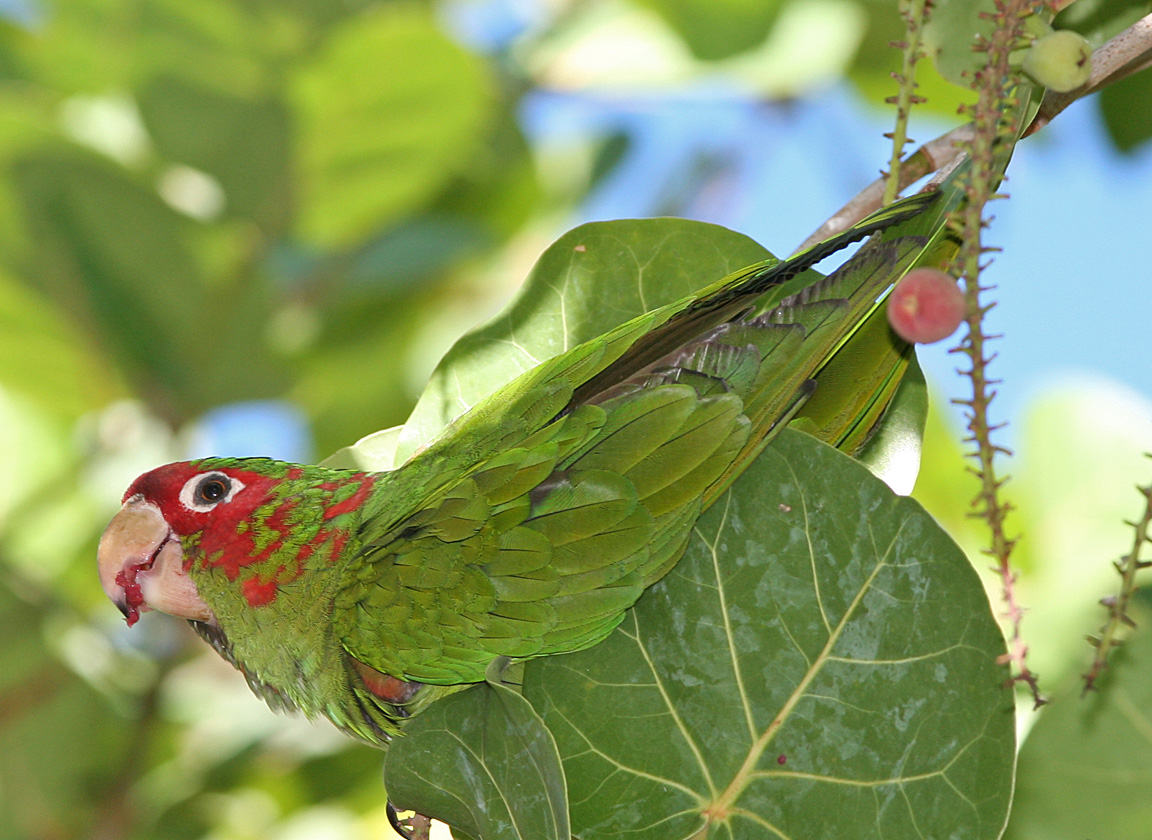
Mitred parakeet
- Lilac-tailed parrotlet, Touit batavicus (E-SA)
- Scarlet-shouldered parrotlet, Touit huetii (E-SA)
- Blue-fronted parrotlet, Touit dilectissimus
- Sapphire-rumped parrotlet, Touit purpuratus (E-SA)
- Brown-backed parrotlet, Touit melanonotus (E-BR)
- Golden-tailed parrotlet, Touit surdus (E-BR)
- Spot-winged parrotlet, Touit stictopterus (E-SA)
- Gray-hooded parakeet, Psilopsiagon aymara (E-SA)
- Mountain parakeet, Psilopsiagon aurifrons (E-SA)
- Barred parakeet, Bolborhynchus lineola
- Rufous-fronted parakeet, Bolborhynchus ferrugineifrons (E-CO)
- Andean parakeet, Bolborhynchus orbygnesius (E-SA)
- Tepui parrotlet, Nannopsittaca panychlora (E-SA)
- Amazonian parrotlet, Nannopsittaca dachilleae (E-SA)
- Monk parakeet, Myiopsitta monachus (E-SA) (widely introduced outside South America)
- Cliff parakeet, Myiopsitta luchsi (E-BO)
- Tui parakeet, Brotogeris sanctithomae (E-SA)
- Plain parakeet, Brotogeris tirica (E-BR)
- Canary-winged parakeet, Brotogeris versicolurus (E-SA)
- Yellow-chevroned parakeet, Brotogeris chiriri (E-SA)
- Gray-cheeked parakeet, Brotogeris pyrrhoptera (E-SA)
- Orange-chinned parakeet, Brotogeris jugularis
- Cobalt-winged parakeet, Brotogeris cyanoptera (E-SA)
- Golden-winged parakeet, Brotogeris chrysoptera (E-SA)
- Pileated parrot, Pionopsitta pileata (E-SA)
- Blue-bellied parrot, Triclaria malachitacea (E-BR)
- Rusty-faced parrot, Hapalopsittaca amazonina (E-SA)
- Indigo-winged parrot, Hapalopsittaca fuertesi (E-CO)
- Red-faced parrot, Hapalopsittaca pyrrhops (E-SA)
- Black-winged parrot, Hapalopsittaca melanotis (E-SA)
- Brown-hooded parrot, Pyrilia haematotis
- Rose-faced parrot, Pyrilia pulchra (E-SA)
- Saffron-headed parrot, Pyrilia pyrilia
- Orange-cheeked parrot, Pyrilia barrabandi (E-SA)
- Caica parrot, Pyrilia caica (E-SA)
- Bald parrot, Pyrilia aurantiocephala (E-BR)
- Vulturine parrot, Pyrilia vulturina (E-BR)
- Dusky parrot, Pionus fuscus (E-SA)
- Red-billed parrot, Pionus sordidus (E-SA)
- Scaly-headed parrot, Pionus maximiliani (E-SA)
- Speckle-faced parrot, Pionus tumultuosus (E-SA)
- Blue-headed parrot, Pionus menstruus
- Bronze-winged parrot, Pionus chalcopterus (E-SA)
- Short-tailed parrot, Graydidascalus brachyurus (E-SA)
- Yellow-faced parrot, Alipiopsitta xanthops (E-SA)
- Festive amazon, Amazona festiva (E-SA)
- Vinaceous-breasted amazon, Amazona vinacea (E-SA)
- Tucuman amazon, Amazona tucumana (E-SA)
- Red-spectacled amazon, Amazona pretrei (E-BR)
- Red-lored amazon, Amazona autumnalis
- Blue-cheeked amazon, Amazona dufresniana (E-SA)
- Red-browed amazon, Amazona rhodocorytha (E-BR)
- Yellow-crowned amazon, Amazona ochrocephala
- Yellow-shouldered amazon, Amazona barbadensis (E-SA)
- Turquoise-fronted amazon, Amazona aestiva (E-SA)
- Mealy amazon, Amazona farinosa
- Kawall's amazon, Amazona kawalli (E-SA)
- Red-tailed amazon, Amazona brasiliensis (E-BR)
- Orange-winged amazon, Amazona amazonica (E-SA)
- Scaly-naped amazon, Amazona mercenarius (E-SA)
- Dusky-billed parrotlet, Forpus modestus (E-SA)
- Riparian parrotlet, Forpus crassirostris (E-SA)
- Spectacled parrotlet, Forpus conspicillatus
- Pacific parrotlet, Forpus coelestis (E-SA)
- Yellow-faced parrotlet, Forpus xanthops (E-PE)
- Cobalt-rumped parrotlet, Forpus xanthopterygius (E-SA)
- Green-rumped parrotlet, Forpus passerinus (E-SA)
- Turquoise-winged parrotlet, Forpus spengeli (E-CO)
- Black-headed parrot, Pionites melanocephalus (E-SA)
- White-bellied parrot, Pionites leucogaster (E-SA)
- Red-fan parrot, Deroptyus accipitrinus (E-SA)
- Ochre-marked parakeet, Pyrrhura cruentata (E-BR)
- Blaze-winged parakeet, Pyrrhura devillei (E-SA)
- Maroon-bellied parakeet, Pyrrhura frontalis (E-SA)
- Pearly parakeet, Pyrrhura lepida (E-BR)
- Crimson-bellied parakeet, Pyrrhura perlata (E-SA)
- Green-cheeked parakeet, Pyrrhura molinae (E-SA)
- Pfrimer's parakeet, Pyrrhura pfrimeri (E-BR)
- Gray-breasted parakeet, Pyrrhura griseipectus (E-BR)
- Maroon-faced parakeet, Pyrrhura leucotis (E-BR)
- Painted parakeet, Pyrrhura picta (E-SA)
- Santarem parakeet, Pyrrhura amazonum (E-SA)
- Bonaparte's parakeet, Pyrrhura lucianii (E-SA)
- Rose-fronted parakeet, Pyrrhura roseifrons (E-SA)
- Santa Marta parakeet, Pyrrhura viridicata (E-CO)
- Fiery-shouldered parakeet, Pyrrhura egregia (E-SA)
- Maroon-tailed parakeet, Pyrrhura melanura (E-SA)
- El Oro parakeet, Pyrrhura orcesi (E-EC)
- Black-capped parakeet, Pyrrhura rupicola (E-SA)
- White-necked parakeet, Pyrrhura albipectus (E-EC)
- Brown-breasted parakeet, Pyrrhura calliptera (E-CO)
- Red-eared parakeet, Pyrrhura hoematotis (E-VE)
- Rose-headed parakeet, Pyrrhura rhodocephala (E-VE)
- Austral parakeet, Enicognathus ferrugineus (E-SA)
- Slender-billed parakeet, Enicognathus leptorhynchus (E-CH)
- Burrowing parakeet, Cyanoliseus patagonus (E-SA)
- Hyacinth macaw, Anodorhynchus hyacinthinus (E-SA)
- Glaucous macaw, Anodorhynchus glaucus (E-SA) (possibly extinct)
- Indigo macaw, Anodorhynchus leari (E-BR)
- Peach-fronted parakeet, Eupsittula aurea (E-SA)
- Brown-throated parakeet, Eupsittula pertinax
- Cactus parakeet, Eupsittula cactorum (E-BR)
- Dusky-headed parakeet, Aratinga weddellii (E-SA)
- Nanday parakeet, Aratinga nenday (E-SA)
- Sun parakeet, Aratinga solstitialis (E-SA)
- Sulphur-breasted parakeet, Aratinga maculata (E-SA)
- Jandaya parakeet, Aratinga jandaya (E-BR)
- Golden-capped parakeet, Aratinga auricapillus (E-BR)
- Spix's macaw, Cyanopsitta spixii (E-BR) (extinct in the wild)
- Red-bellied macaw, Orthopsittaca manilatus (E-SA)
- Blue-winged macaw, Primolius maracana (E-SA)
- Blue-headed macaw, Primolius couloni (E-SA)
- Yellow-collared macaw, Primolius auricollis (E-SA)
- Blue-and-yellow macaw, Ara ararauna
- Blue-throated macaw, Ara glaucogularis (E-BO)
- Chestnut-fronted macaw, Ara severus
- Red-fronted macaw, Ara rubrogenys (E-BO)
- Military macaw, Ara militaris
- Great green macaw, Ara ambiguus
- Scarlet macaw, Ara macao
- Red-and-green macaw, Ara chloropterus
- Golden-plumed parakeet, Leptosittaca branickii (E-SA)
- Yellow-eared parrot, Ognorhynchus icterotis (E-SA)
- Golden parakeet, Guaruba guarouba (E-BR)
- Blue-crowned parakeet, Thectocercus acuticaudatus (E-SA)
- Red-shouldered macaw, Diopsittaca nobilis (E-SA)
- Scarlet-fronted parakeet, Psittacara wagleri (E-SA)
- Cordilleran parakeet, Psittacar frontatus (E-SA)
- Mitred parakeet, Psittacara mitratus (E-SA)
- Red-masked parakeet, Psittacara erythrogenys (E-SA)
- White-eyed parakeet, Psittacara leucophthalmus (E-SA)

== Sapayoa ==
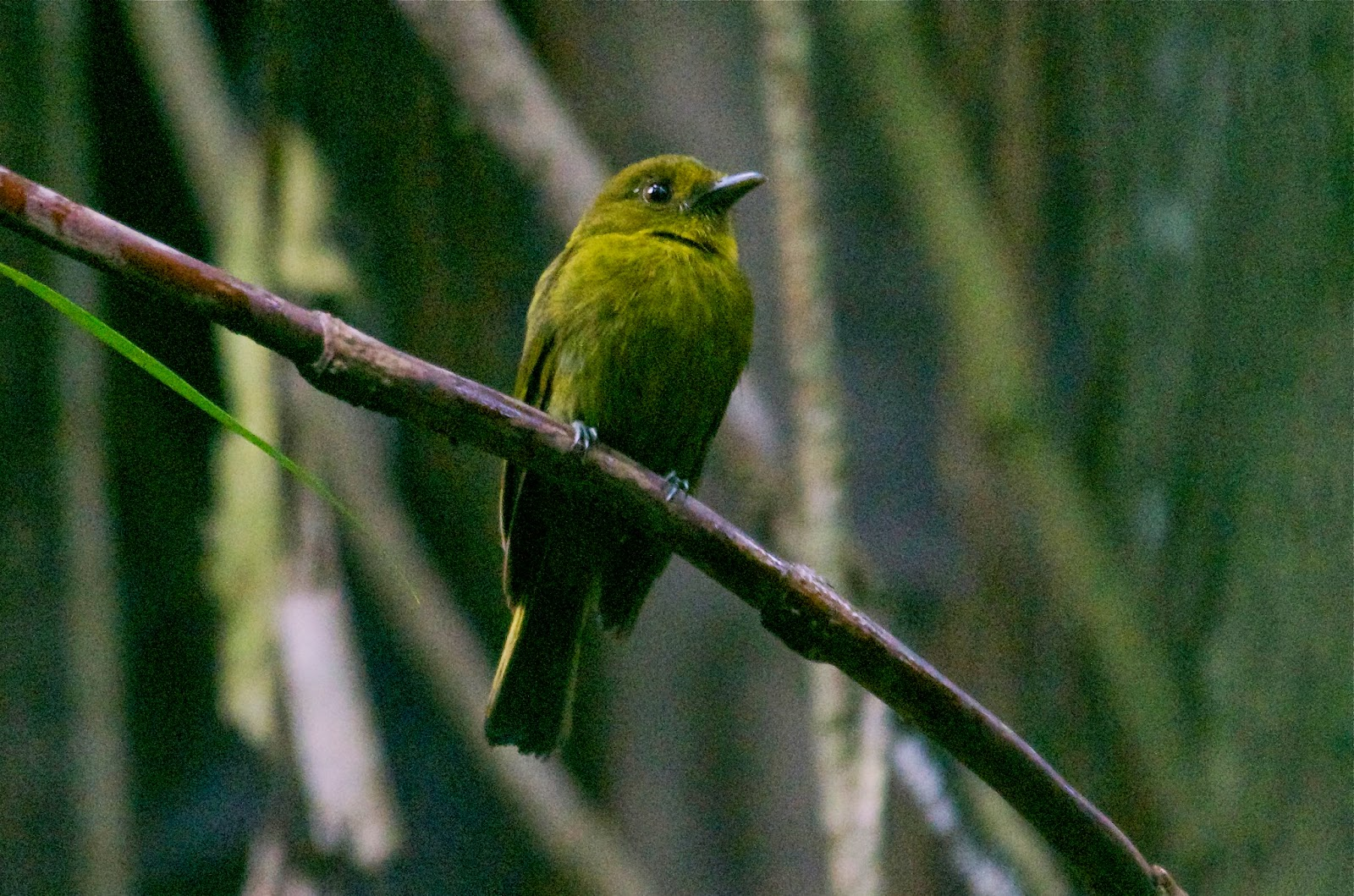
Sapayoa

Order: Passeriformes Family: Sapayoidae

The sapayoa is the only member of its family, and is found in the lowland rainforests of Panama and north-western South America. It is usually seen in pairs or mixed-species flocks.

- Sapayoa, Sapayoa aenigma

== Antbirds ==
Order: Passeriformes Family: Thamnophilidae

The antbirds are a large family of small passerine birds of subtropical and tropical Central and South America. They are forest birds which tend to feed on insects at or near the ground. A sizable minority of them specialize in following columns of army ants to eat small invertebrates that leave their hiding places to flee from the ants. Many species lack bright color, with brown, black, and white being the dominant tones.

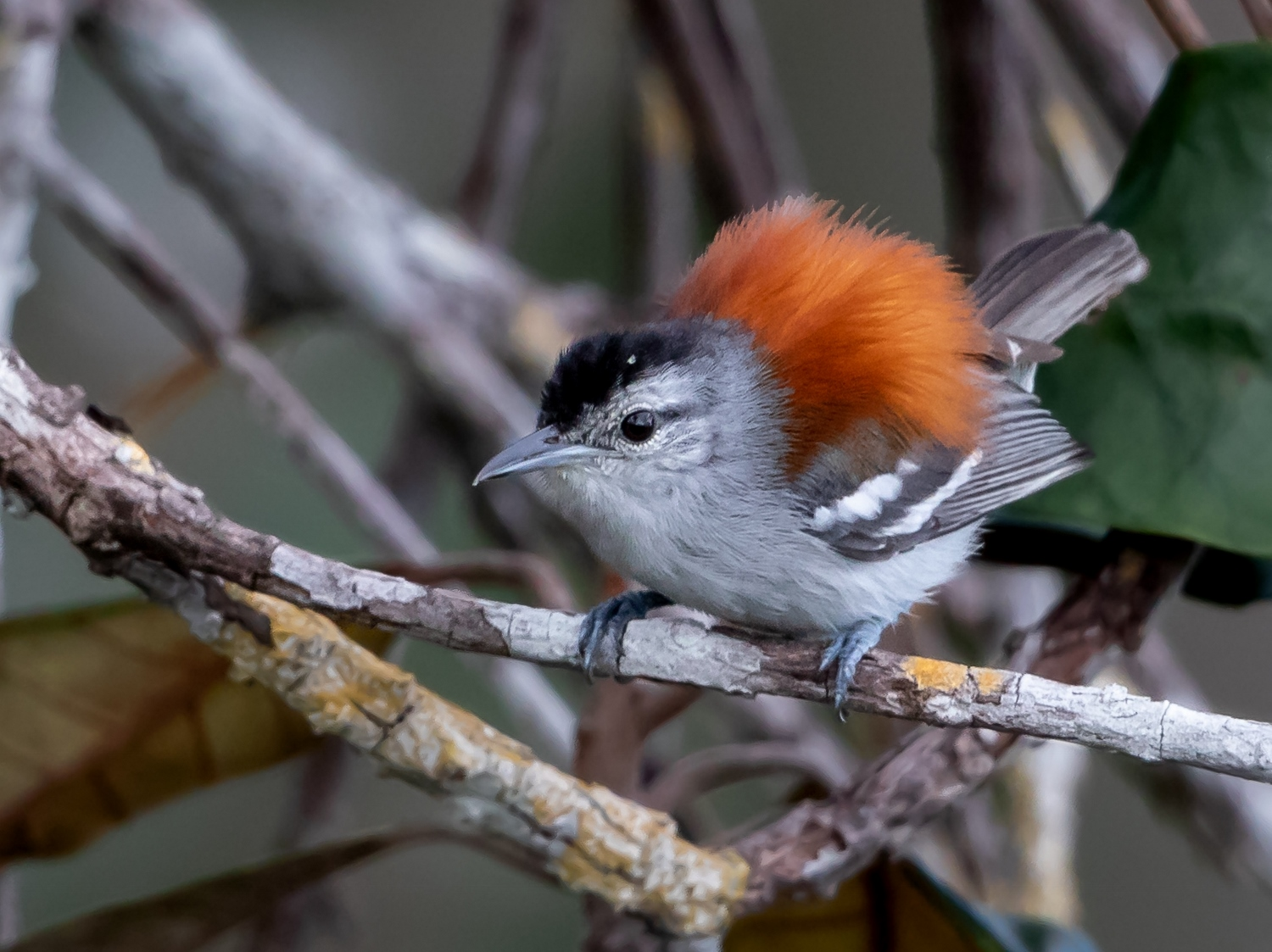
Ash-winged antwren

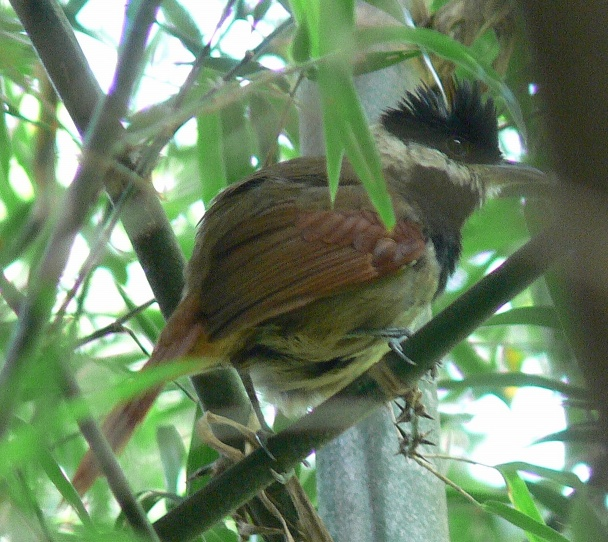
White-bearded antshrike

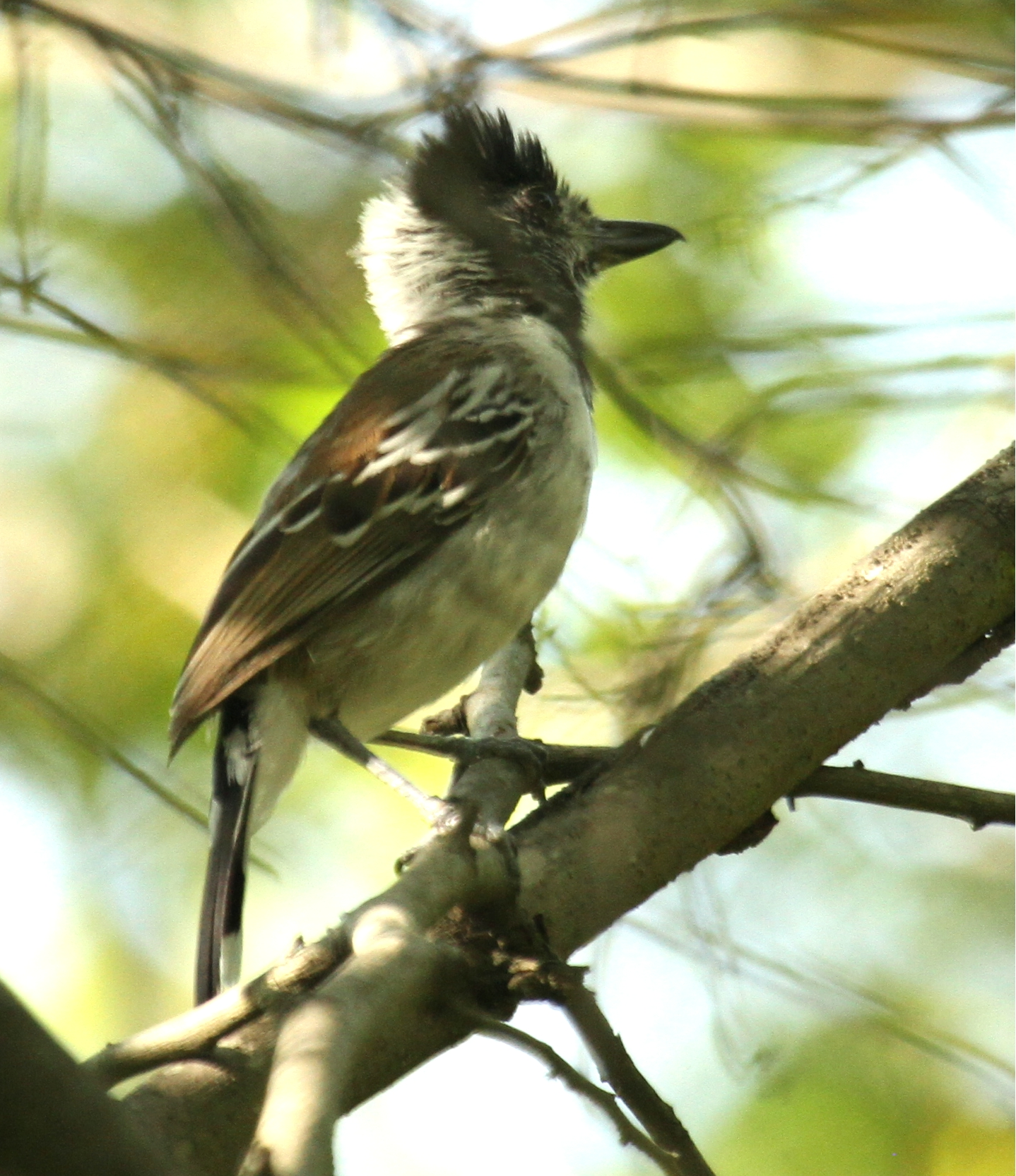
Collared antshrike

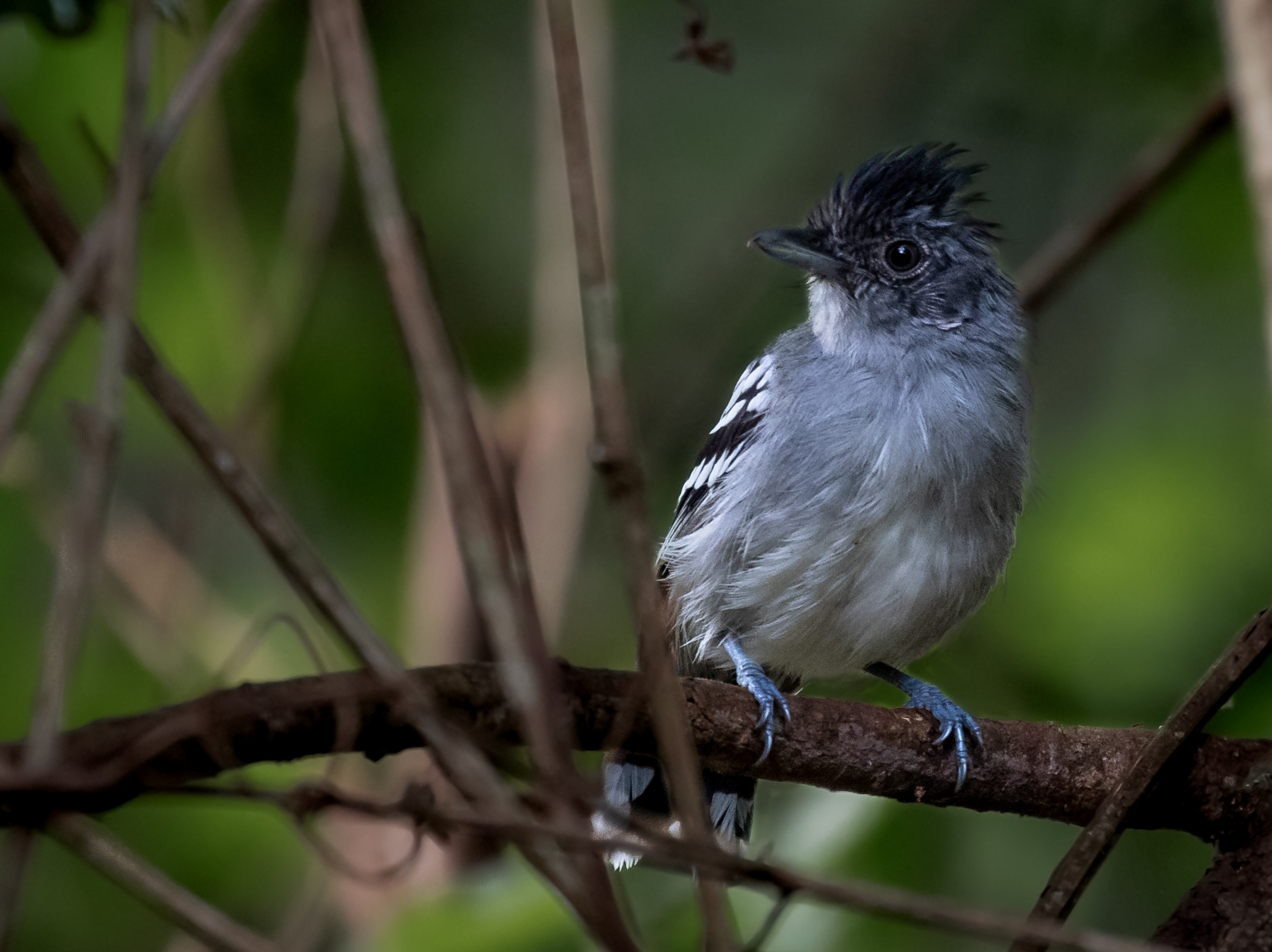
Bolivian slaty-antshrike

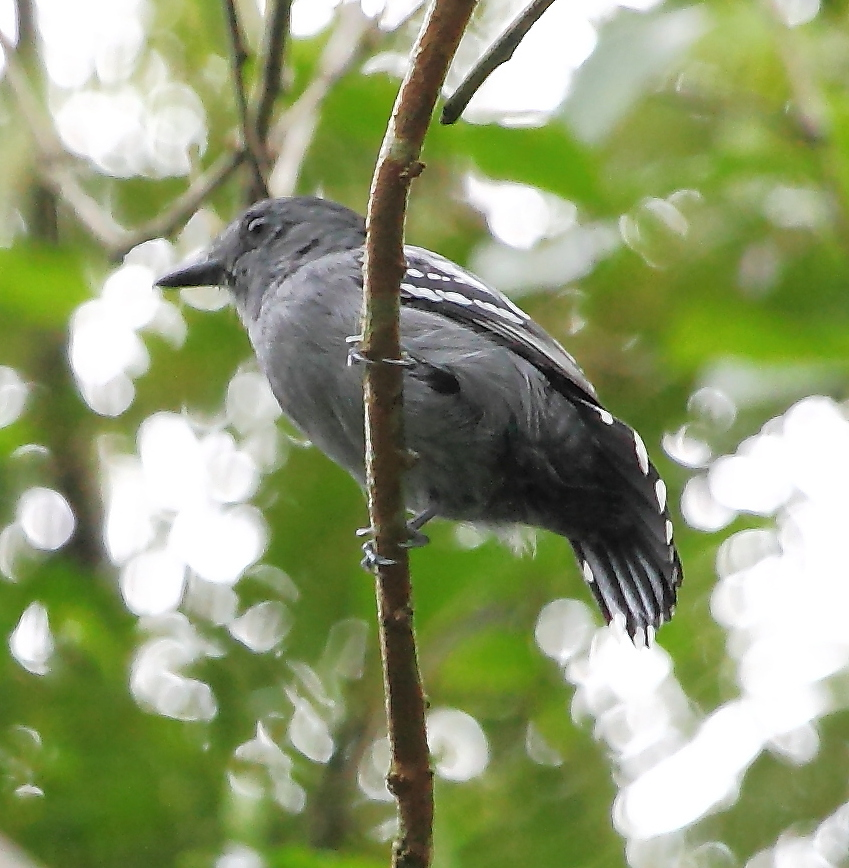
Amazonian antshrike

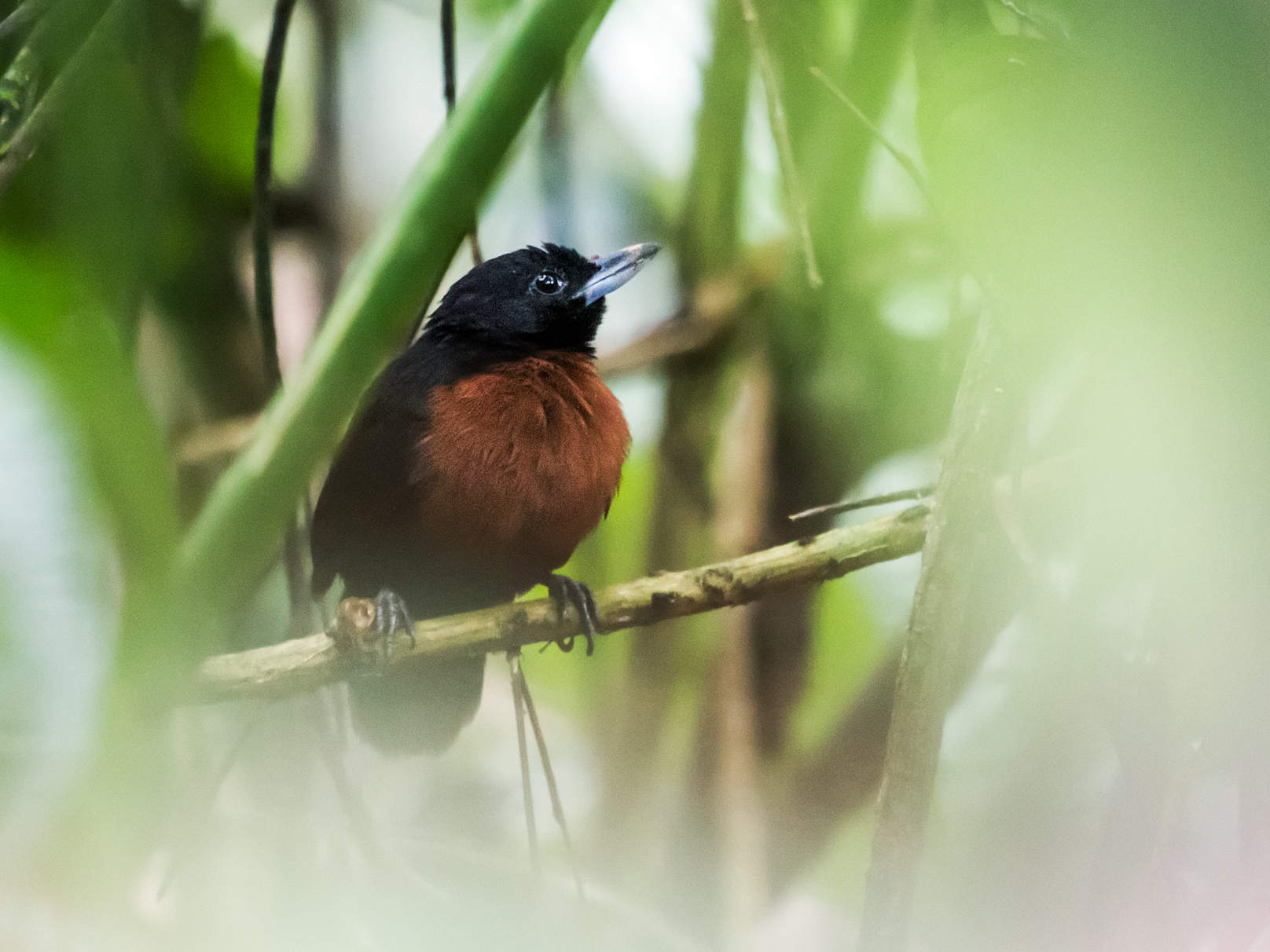
Black bushbird

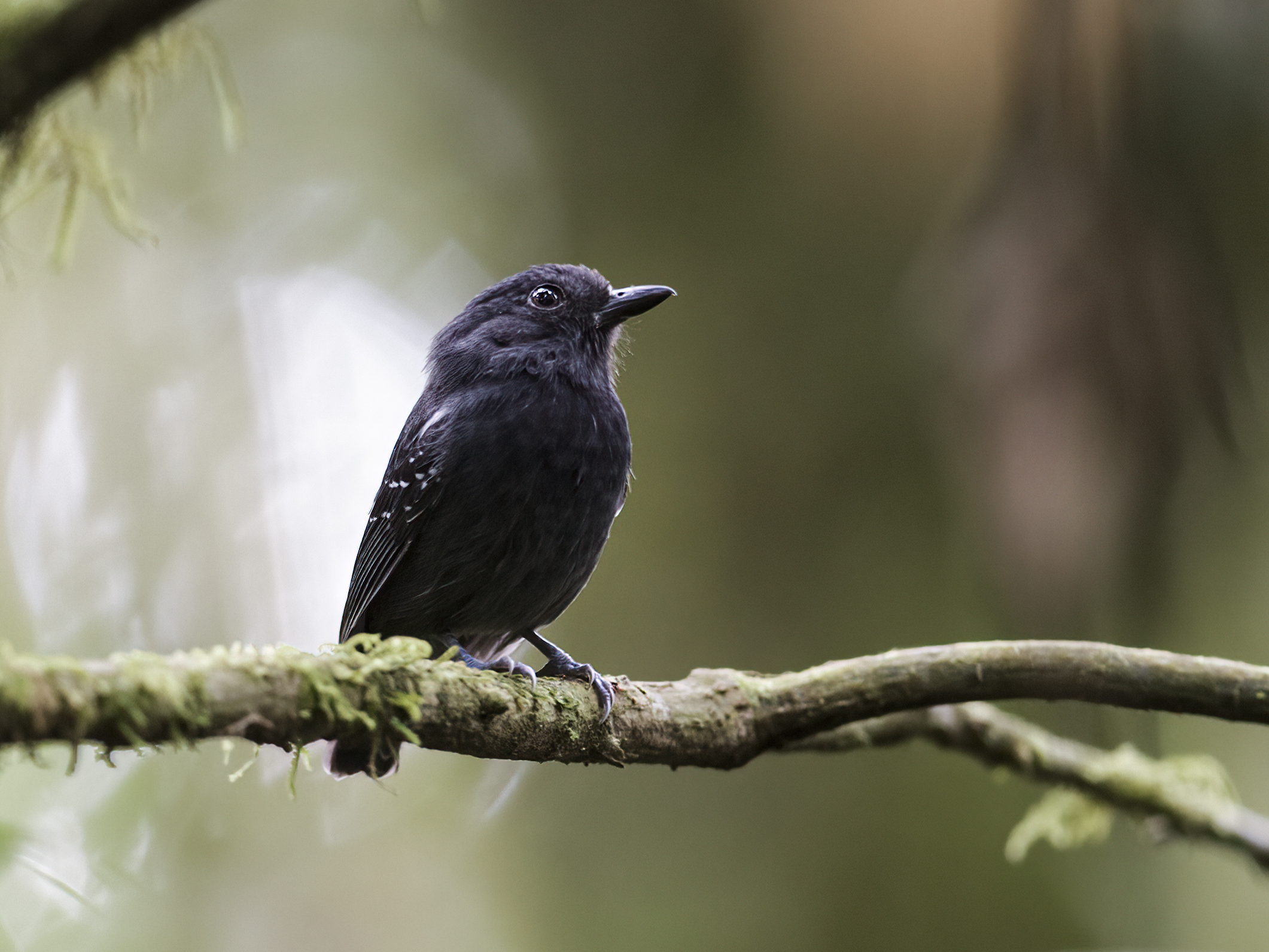
White-streaked antvireo

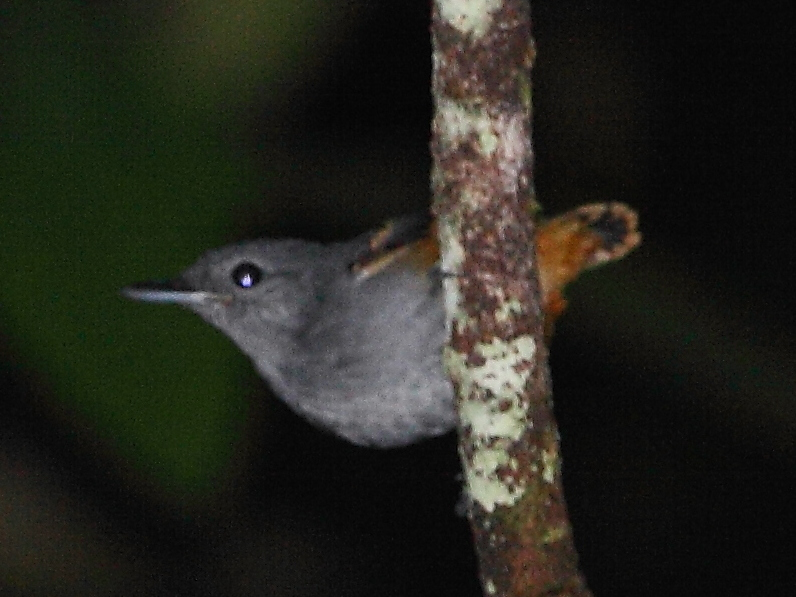
Rufous-bellied antwren

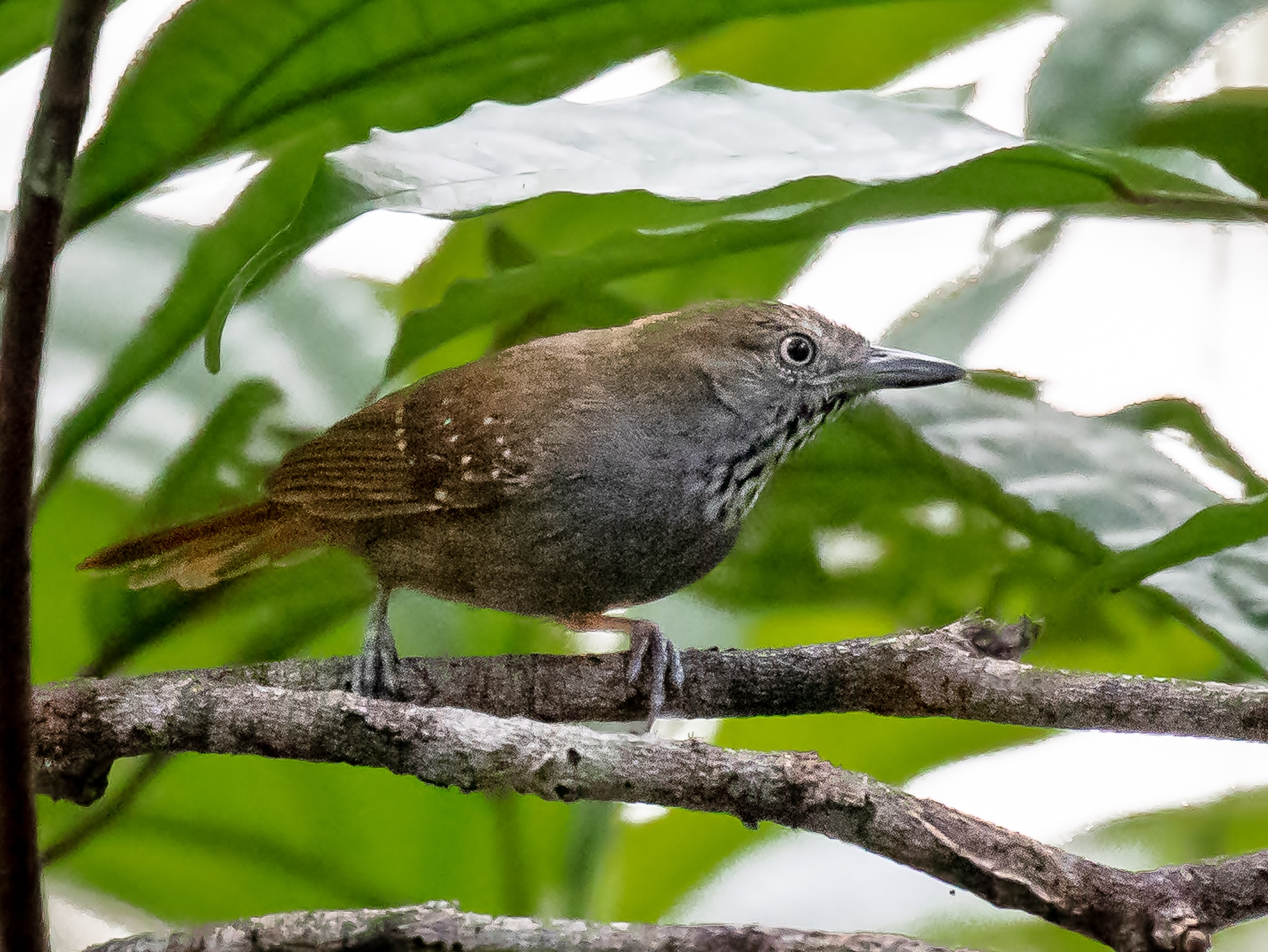
Brown-belllied stipplethroat

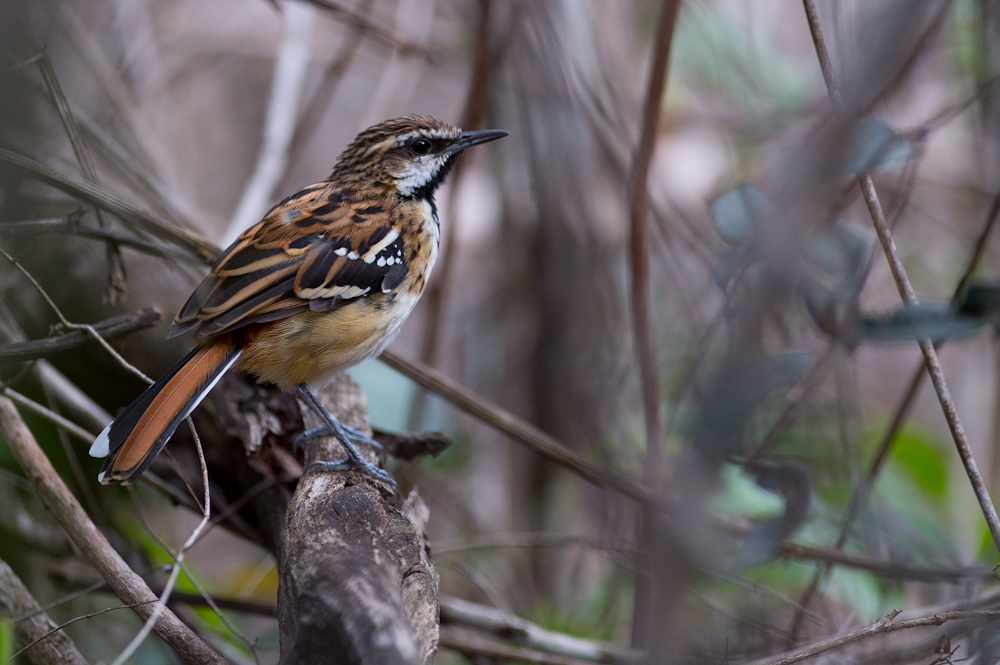
Stripe-backed antbird

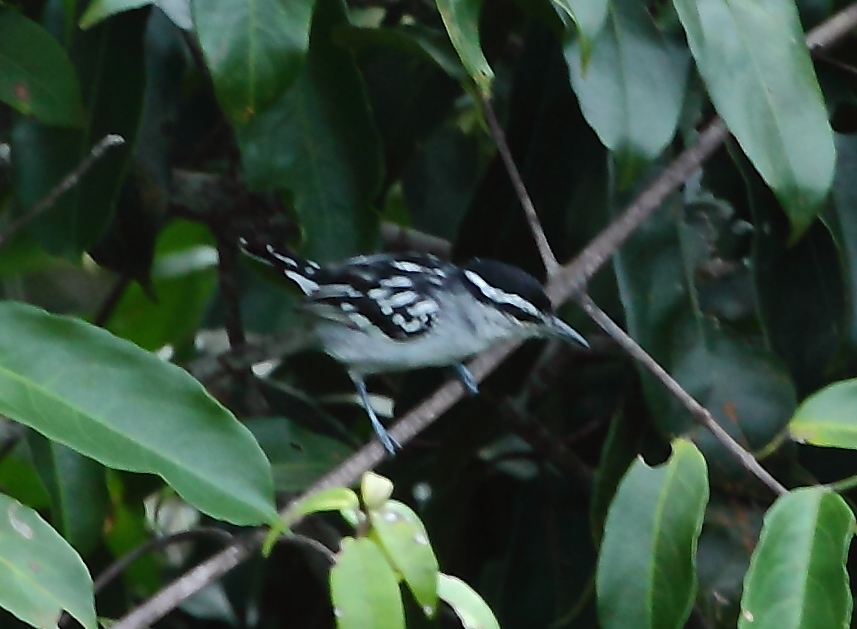
Spot-backed antwren

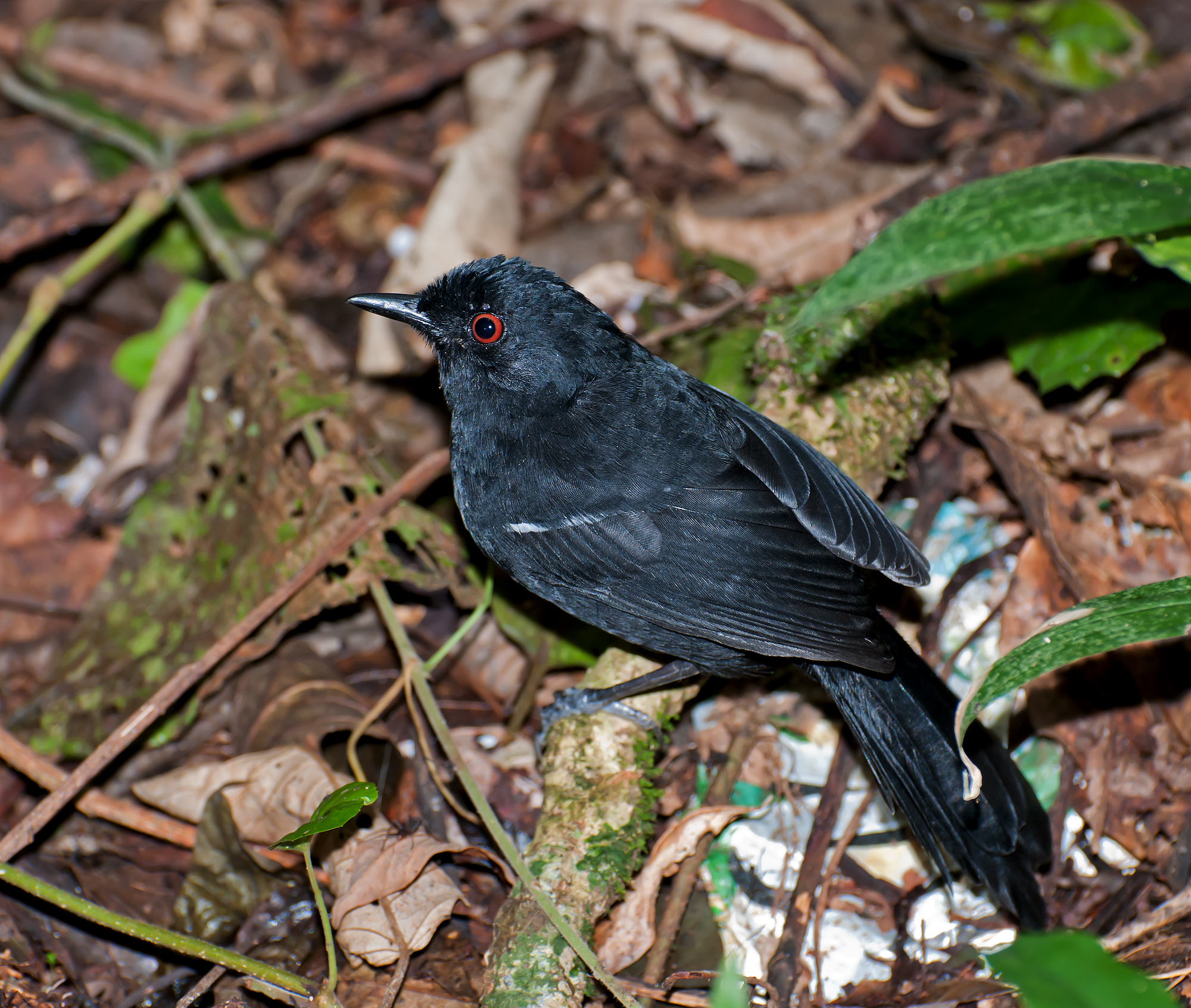
White-shouldered fire-eye

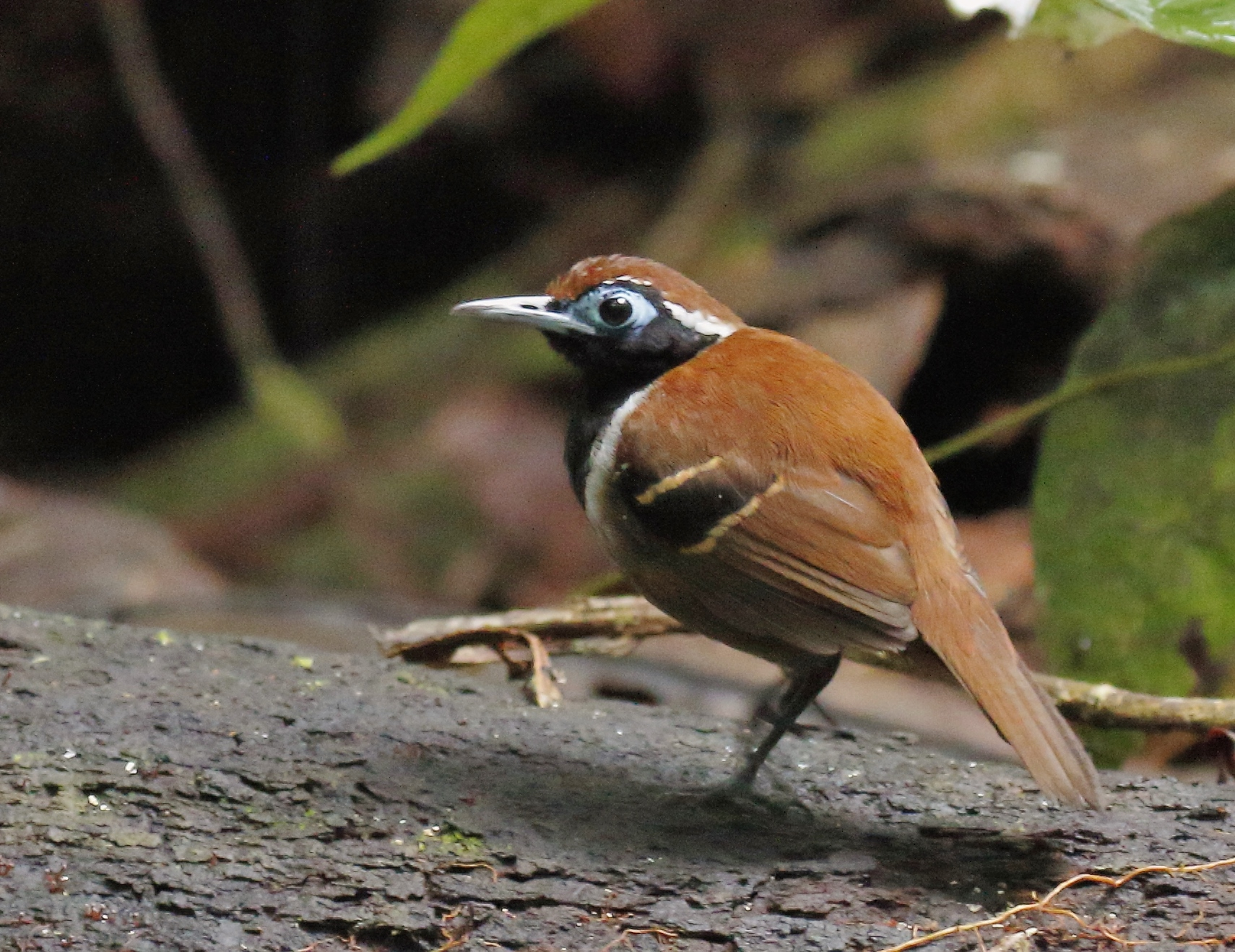
Ferruginous-backed antbird

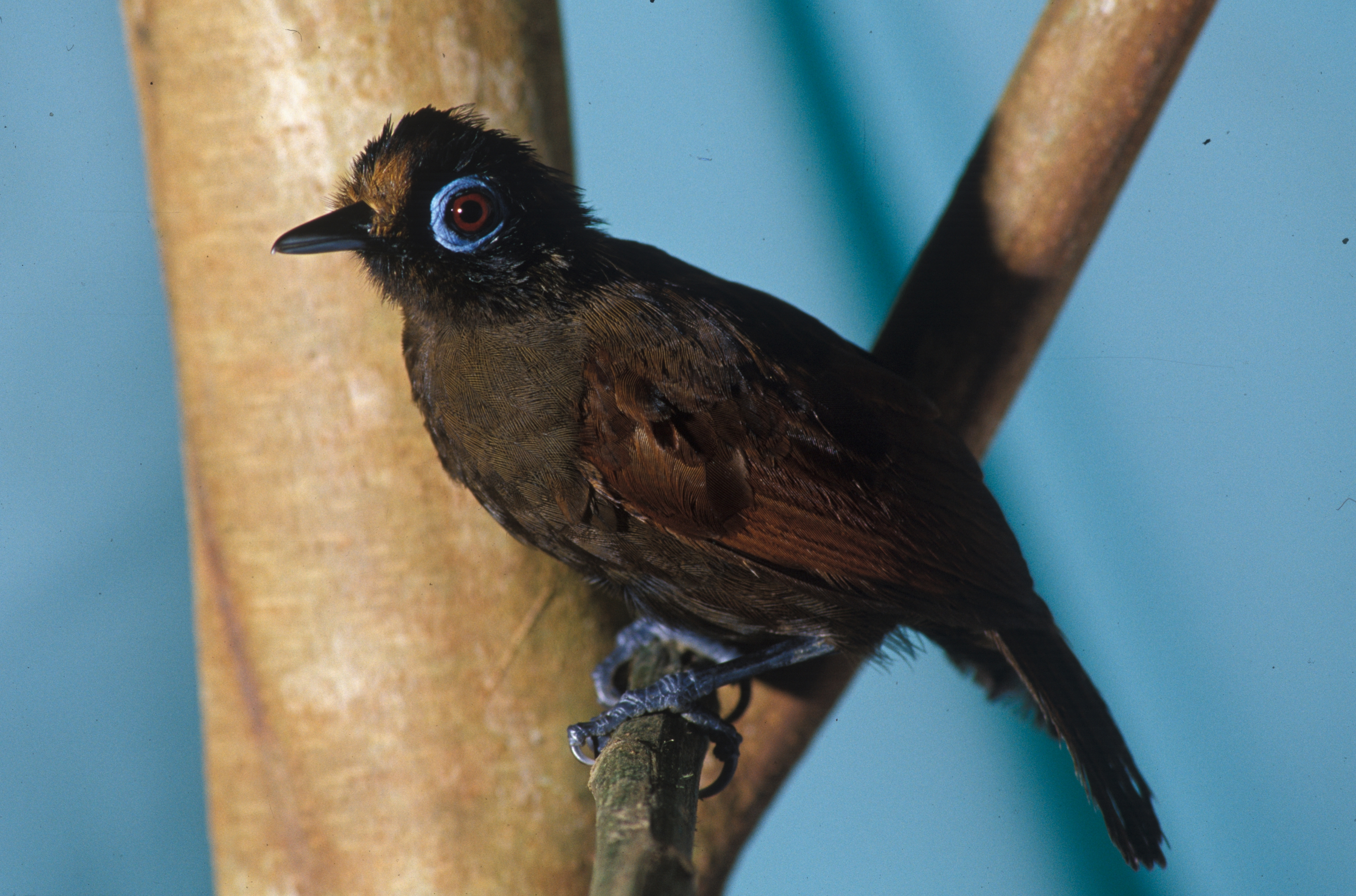
Hairy-crested antbird

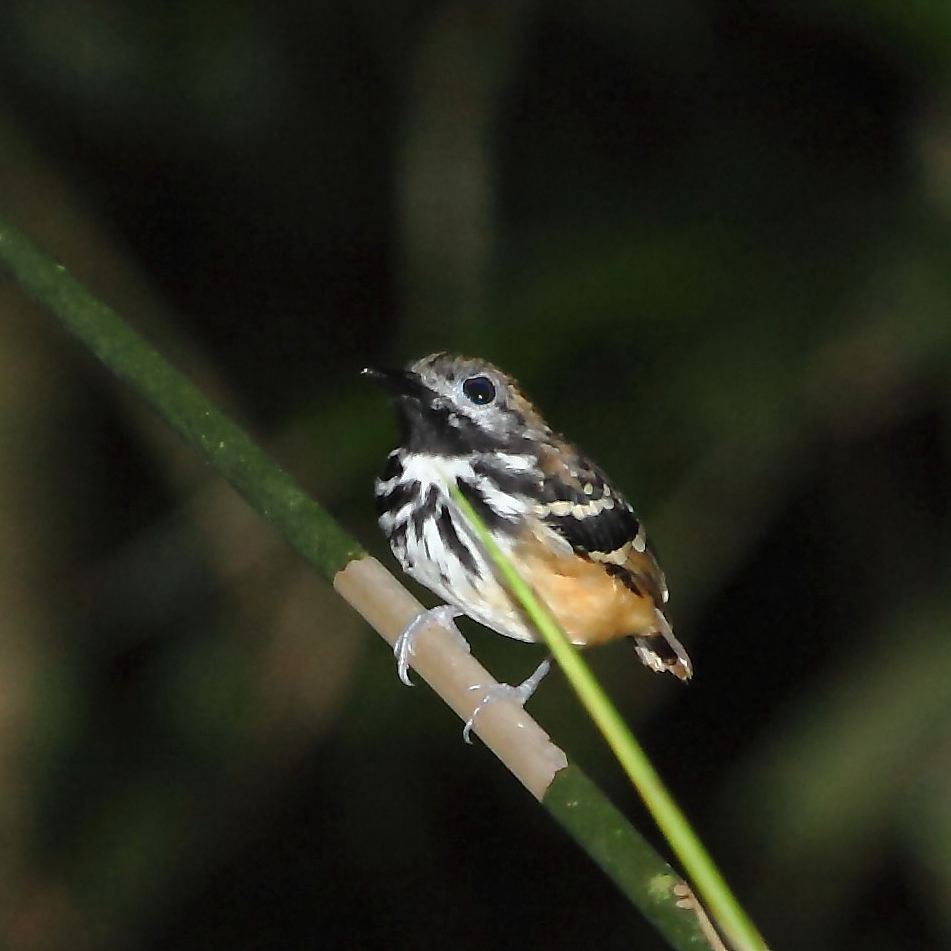
Dot-backed antbird
- Rufous-rumped antwren, Euchrepomis callinota
- Chestnut-shouldered antwren, Euchrepomis humeralis (E-SA)
- Yellow-rumped antwren, Euchrepomis sharpei (E-SA)
- Ash-winged antwren, Euchrepomis spodioptila (E-SA)
- Fasciated antshrike, Cymbilaimus lineatus
- Bamboo antshrike, Cymbilaimus sanctaemariae (E-SA)
- Spot-backed antshrike, Hypoedaleus guttatus (E-SA)
- Giant antshrike, Batara cinerea (E-SA)
- Large-tailed antshrike, Mackenziaena leachii (E-SA)
- Tufted antshrike, Mackenziaena severa (E-SA)
- Black-throated antshrike, Frederickena viridis (E-SA)
- Undulated antshrike, Frederickena unduliger (E-SA)
- Fulvous antshrike, Frederickena fulva (E-SA)
- Great antshrike, Taraba major
- Black-crested antshrike, Sakesphorus canadensis (E-SA)
- Glossy antshrike, Sakesphorus luctuosus (E-BR)
- Caatinga antwren, Radinopsyche sellowi (E-BR)
- White-bearded antshrike, Biatas nigropectus (E-SA)
- Barred antshrike, Thamnophilus doliatus
- Rufous-capped antshrike, Thamnophilus ruficapillus (E-SA)
- Rufous-winged antshrike, Thamnophilus torquatus (E-SA)
- Chapman's antshrike, Thamnophilus zarumae (E-SA)
- Bar-crested antshrike, Thamnophilus multistriatus (E-SA)
- Lined antshrike, Thamnophilus tenuepunctatus (E-SA)
- Chestnut-backed antshrike, Thamnophilus palliatus (E-SA)
- Collared antshrike, Thamnophilus bernardi (E-SA)
- Black-crowned antshrike, Thamnophilus atrinucha
- Plain-winged antshrike, Thamnophilus schistaceus (E-SA)
- Mouse-colored antshrike, Thamnophilus murinus (E-SA)
- Black antshrike, Thamnophilus nigriceps
- Cocha antshrike, Thamnophilus praecox (E-SA)
- Castelnau's antshrike, Thamnophilus cryptoleucus (E-SA)
- Blackish-gray antshrike, Thamnophilus nigrocinereus (E-SA)
- Northern slaty-antshrike, Thamnophilus punctatus (E-SA)
- Natterer's slaty-antshrike, Thamnophilus stictocephalus (E-SA)
- Bolivian slaty-antshrike, Thamnophilus sticturus (E-SA)
- Planalto slaty-antshrike, Thamnophilus pelzelni (E-BR)
- Sooretama slaty-antshrike, Thamnophilus ambiguus (E-BR)
- Variable antshrike, Thamnophilus caerulescens (E-SA)
- Uniform antshrike, Thamnophilus unicolor (E-SA)
- White-shouldered antshrike, Thamnophilus aethiops (E-SA)
- Upland antshrike, Thamnophilus aroyae (E-SA)
- Black-backed antshrike, Thamnophilus melanonotus (E-SA)
- Band-tailed antshrike, Thamnophilus melanothorax (E-SA)
- Amazonian antshrike, Thamnophilus amazonicus (E-SA)
- Streak-backed antshrike, Thamnophilus insignis (E-SA)
- Acre antshrike, Thamnophilus divisorius (E-SA)
- Star-throated antwren, Rhopias gularis (E-BR)
- Pearly antshrike, Megastictus margaritatus (E-SA)
- Black bushbird, Neoctantes niger (E-SA)
- Recurve-billed bushbird, Clytoctantes alixii (E-SA)
- Rondonia bushbird, Clytoctantes atrogularis (E-BR)
- Russet antshrike, Thamnistes anabatinus
- Rufescent antshrike, Thamnistes rufescens (E-SA)
- Silvery-cheeked antshrike, Sakesphoroides cristatus (E-BR)
- Spot-breasted antvireo, Dysithamnus stictothorax (E-BR)
- Plain antvireo, Dysithamnus mentalis
- Spot-crowned antvireo, Dysithamnus puncticeps
- Rufous-backed antvireo, Dysithamnus xanthopterus (E-BR)
- Bicolored antvireo, Dysithamnus occidentalis (E-SA)
- White-streaked antvireo, Dysithamnus leucostictus (E-SA)
- Plumbeous antvireo, Dysithamnus plumbeus (E-BR)
- Ash-throated antwren, Herpsilochmus parkeri (E-PE)
- Creamy-bellied antwren, Herpsilochmus motacilloides (E-PE)
- Predicted antwren, Herpsilochmus praedictus (E-BR)
- Aripuana antwren, Herpsilochmus stotzi (E-BR)
- Black-capped antwren, Herpsilochmus atricapillus (E-SA)
- Bahia antwren, Herpsilochmus pileatus (E-BR)
- Spot-tailed antwren, Herpsilochmus sticturus (E-SA)
- Dugand's antwren, Herpsilochmus dugandi (E-SA)
- Todd's antwren, Herpsilochmus stictocephalus (E-SA)
- Ancient antwren, Herpsilochmus gentryi (E-SA)
- Spot-backed antwren, Herpsilochmus dorsimaculatus (E-SA)
- Roraiman antwren, Herpsilochmus roraimae (E-SA)
- Pectoral antwren, Herpsilochmus pectoralis (E-BR)
- Large-billed antwren, Herpsilochmus longirostris (E-SA)
- Yellow-breasted antwren, Herpsilochmus axillaris (E-SA)
- Rufous-margined antwren, Herpsilochmus frater (E-SA)
- Rusty-winged antwren, Herpsilochmus rufimarginatus
- Dusky-throated antshrike, Thamnomanes ardesiacus (E-SA)
- Saturnine antshrike, Thamnomanes saturninus (E-SA)
- Cinereous antshrike, Thamnomanes caesius (E-SA)
- Bluish-slate antshrike, Thamnomanes schistogynus (E-SA)
- Spiny-faced antshrike, Xenornis setifrons
- Plain-throated antwren, Isleria hauxwelli (E-SA)
- Rufous-bellied antwren, Isleria guttata (E-SA)
- Spot-winged antshrike, Pygiptila stellaris (E-SA)
- Checker-throated stipplethroat, Epinecrophylla fulviventris
- Ornate stipplethroat, Epinecrophylla ornata (E-SA)
- Rufous-tailed stipplethroat, Epinecrophylla erythrura (E-SA)
- White-eyed stipplethroat, Epinecrophylla leucophthalma (E-SA)
- Brown-bellied stipplethroat, Epinecrophylla gutturalis (E-SA)
- Rufous-backed stipplethroat, Epinecrophylla haematonota (E-SA)
- Foothill stipplethroat, Epinecrophylla spodionota (E-SA)
- Rio Madeira stipplethroat, Epinecrophylla amazonica (E-SA)
- Pygmy antwren, Myrmotherula brachyura (E-SA)
- Moustached antwren, Myrmotherula ignota
- Yellow-throated antwren, Myrmotherula ambigua (E-SA)
- Sclater's antwren, Myrmotherula sclateri (E-SA)
- Guianan streaked-antwren, Myrmotherula surinamensis (E-SA)
- Amazonian streaked-antwren, Myrmotherula multostriata (E-SA)
- Pacific antwren, Myrmotherula pacifica
- Cherrie's antwren, Myrmotherula cherriei (E-SA)
- Klages's antwren, Myrmotherula klagesi (E-BR)
- Stripe-chested antwren, Myrmotherula longicauda (E-SA)
- White-flanked antwren, Myrmotherula axillaris
- Slaty antwren, Myrmotherula schisticolor
- Rio Suno antwren, Myrmotherula sunensis (E-SA)
- Salvadori's antwren, Myrmotherula minor (E-BR)
- Long-winged antwren, Myrmotherula longipennis (E-SA)
- Band-tailed antwren, Myrmotherula urosticta (E-BR)
- Ihering's antwren, Myrmotherula iheringi (E-SA)
- Rio de Janeiro antwren, Myrmotherula fluminensis (E-BR)
- Ashy antwren, Myrmotherula grisea (E-SA)
- Unicolored antwren, Myrmotherula unicolor (E-BR)
- Alagoas antwren, Myrmotherula snowi (E-BR)
- Plain-winged antwren, Myrmotherula behni (E-SA)
- Gray antwren, Myrmotherula menetriesii (E-SA)
- Leaden antwren, Myrmotherula assimilis (E-SA)
- Banded antbird, Dichrozona cincta (E-SA)
- Stripe-backed antbird, Myrmorchilus strigilatus (E-SA)
- Dot-winged antwren, Microrhopias quixensis
- Narrow-billed antwren, Formicivora iheringi (E-BR)
- Black-hooded antwren, Formicivora erythronotos (E-BR)
- White-fringed antwren, Formicivora grisea
- Serra antwren, Formicivora serrana (E-BR)
- Restinga antwren, Formicivora littoralis (E-BR)
- Black-bellied antwren, Formicivora melanogaster (E-SA)
- Rusty-backed antwren, Formicivora rufa (E-SA)
- Sincora antwren, Formicivora grantsaui (E-BR)
- Marsh antwren, Formicivora acutirostris (E-BR)
- Ferruginous antbird, Drymophila ferruginea (E-BR)
- Bertoni's antbird, Drymophila rubricollis (E-SA)
- Rufous-tailed antbird, Drymophila genei (E-BR)
- Ochre-rumped antbird, Drymophila ochropyga (E-BR)
- Dusky-tailed antbird, Drymophila malura (E-SA)
- Scaled antbird, Drymophila squamata (E-BR)
- Striated antbird, Drymophila devillei (E-SA)
- Santa Marta antbird, Drymophila hellmayri (E-CO)
- Klages's antbird, Drymophila klagesi (E-SA)
- East Andean antbird, Drymophila caudata (E-CO)
- Streak-headed antbird, Drymophila striaticeps (E-SA)
- Guianan warbling-antbird, Hypocnemis cantator (E-SA)
- Imeri warbling-antbird, Hypocnemis flavescens (E-SA)
- Peruvian warbling-antbird, Hypocnemis peruviana (E-SA)
- Yellow-breasted warbling-antbird, Hypocnemis subflava (E-SA)
- Manicore warbling-antbird, Hypocnemis rondoni (E-BR)
- Rondonia warbling-antbird, Hypocnemis ochrogyna (E-SA)
- Spix's warbling-antbird, Hypocnemis striata (E-BR)
- Yellow-browed antbird, Hypocnemis hypoxantha (E-SA)
- Orange-bellied antwren, Terenura sicki (E-BR)
- Streak-capped antwren, Terenura maculata (E-SA)
- Willis's antbird, Cercomacroides laeta (E-SA)
- Parker's antbird, Cercomacroides parkeri (E-CO)
- Dusky antbird, Cercomacroides tyrannina
- Black antbird, Cercomacroides serva (E-SA)
- Blackish antbird, Cercomacroides nigrescens (E-SA)
- Riparian antbird, Cercomacroides fuscicauda (E-SA)
- Manu antbird, Cercomacra manu (E-SA)
- Gray antbird, Cercomacra cinerascens (E-SA)
- Rio de Janeiro antbird, Cercomacra brasiliana (E-BR)
- Mato Grosso antbird, Cercomacra melanaria (E-SA)
- Bananal antbird, Cercomacra ferdinandi (E-BR)
- Jet antbird, Cercomacra nigricans
- Rio Branco antbird, Cercomacra carbonaria (E-SA)
- Western fire-eye, Pyriglena maura (E-SA)
- Tapajos fire-eye, Pyriglena similis (E-BR)
- East Amazonian fire-eye, Pyriglena leuconota (E-BR)
- Fringe-backed fire-eye, Pyriglena atra (E-BR)
- White-shouldered fire-eye, Pyriglena leucoptera (E-SA)
- Slender antbird, Rhopornis ardesiacus (E-BR)
- White-browed antbird, Myrmoborus leucophrys (E-SA)
- Ash-breasted antbird, Myrmoborus lugubris (E-SA)
- Black-faced antbird, Myrmoborus myotherinus (E-SA)
- Black-tailed antbird, Myrmoborus melanurus (E-SA)
- White-lined antbird, Myrmoborus lophotes (E-SA)
- Black-chinned antbird, Hypocnemoides melanopogon (E-SA)
- Band-tailed antbird, Hypocnemoides maculicauda (E-SA)
- Black-and-white antbird, Myrmochanes hemileucus (E-SA)
- Bare-crowned antbird, Gymnocichla nudiceps
- Silvered antbird, Sclateria naevia (E-SA)
- Black-headed antbird, Percnostola rufifrons (E-SA)
- Allpahuayo antbird, Percnostola arenarum (E-PE)
- Slate-colored antbird, Myrmelastes schistaceus (E-SA)
- Roraiman antbird, Myrmelastes saturatus (E-SA)
- Plumbeous antbird, Myrmelastes hyperythrus (E-SA)
- Spot-winged antbird, Myrmelastes leucostigma (E-SA)
- Humaita antbird, Myrmelastes humaythae (E-SA)
- Brownish-headed antbird, Myrmelastes brunneiceps (E-SA)
- Rufous-faced antbird, Myrmelastes rufifacies (E-BR)
- Caura antbird, Myrmelastes caurensis (E-SA)
- White-bellied antbird, Myrmeciza longipes
- Chestnut-backed antbird, Poliocrania exsul
- Gray-headed antbird, Ampelornis griseiceps (E-SA)
- Dull-mantled antbird, Sipia laemosticta (V)
- Magdalena antbird, Sipia palliata (E-SA)
- Esmeraldas antbird, Sipia nigricauda (E-SA)
- Stub-tailed antbird, Sipia berlepschi (E-SA)
- Chestnut-tailed antbird, Sciaphylax hemimelaena (E-SA)
- Zimmer's antbird, Sciaphylax castanea (E-SA)
- Ferruginous-backed antbird, Myrmoderus ferrugineus (E-SA)
- Cordillera Azul antbird, Myrmoderus eowilsoni (E-PE)
- Scalloped antbird, Myrmoderus ruficauda (E-BR)
- White-bibbed antbird, Myrmoderus loricatus (E-BR)
- Squamate antbird, Myrmoderus squamosus (E-BR)
- White-shouldered antbird, Akletos melanoceps (E-SA)
- Goeldi's antbird, Akletos goeldii (E-SA)
- Sooty antbird, Hafferia fortis (E-SA)
- Zeledon's antbird, Hafferia zeledoni
- Blue-lored antbird, Hafferia immaculata (E-SA)
- Yapacana antbird, Aprositornis disjuncta (E-SA)
- Black-throated antbird, Myrmophylax atrothorax (E-SA)
- Gray-bellied antbird, Ammonastes pelzelni (E-SA)
- Wing-banded antbird, Myrmornis torquata
- White-plumed antbird, Pithys albifrons (E-SA)
- White-masked antbird, Pithys castaneus (E-PE)
- Bicolored antbird, Gymnopithys bicolor
- White-cheeked antbird, Gymnopithys leucaspis (E-SA)
- Rufous-throated antbird, Gymnopithys rufigula (E-SA)
- White-throated antbird, Oneillornis salvini (E-SA)
- Lunulated antbird, Oneillornis lunulatus (E-SA)
- Bare-eyed antbird, Rhegmatorhina gymnops (E-BR)
- Harlequin antbird, Rhegmatorhina berlepschi (E-BR)
- White-breasted antbird, Rhegmatorhina hoffmannsi (E-BR)
- Chestnut-crested antbird, Rhegmatorhina cristata (E-SA)
- Hairy-crested antbird, Rhegmatorhina melanosticta (E-SA)
- Spotted antbird, Hylophylax naevioides
- Spot-backed antbird, Hylophylax naevius (E-SA)
- Dot-backed antbird, Hylophylax punctulatus (E-SA)
- Common scale-backed antbird, Willisornis poecilinotus (E-SA)
- Xingu scale-backed antbird, Willisornis vidua (E-BR)
- Black-spotted bare-eye, Phlegopsis nigromaculata (E-SA)
- Reddish-winged bare-eye, Phlegopsis erythroptera (E-SA)
- Pale-faced bare-eye, Phlegopsis borbae (E-BR)
- Ocellated antbird, Phaenostictus mcleannani

== Crescentchests ==
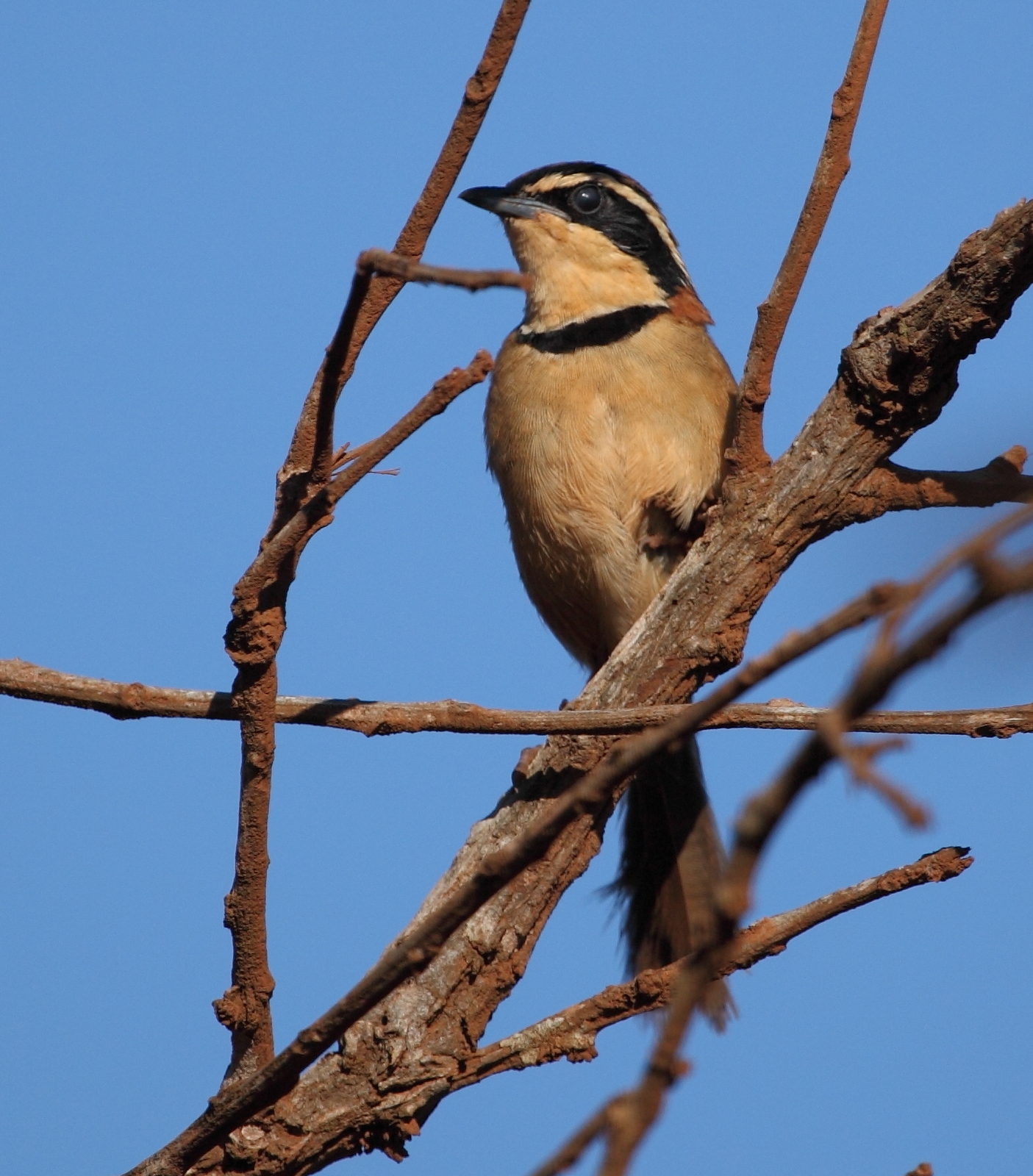
Collared crescentchest

Order: Passeriformes Family: Melanopareiidae

These are smallish birds which inhabit regions of arid scrub. They have a band across the chest which gives them their name.

- Collared crescentchest, Melanopareia torquata (E-SA)
- Olive-crowned crescentchest, Melanopareia maximiliani (E-SA)
- Marañon crescentchest, Melanopareia maranonica (E-SA)
- Elegant crescentchest, Melanopareia elegans (E-SA)

== Gnateaters ==
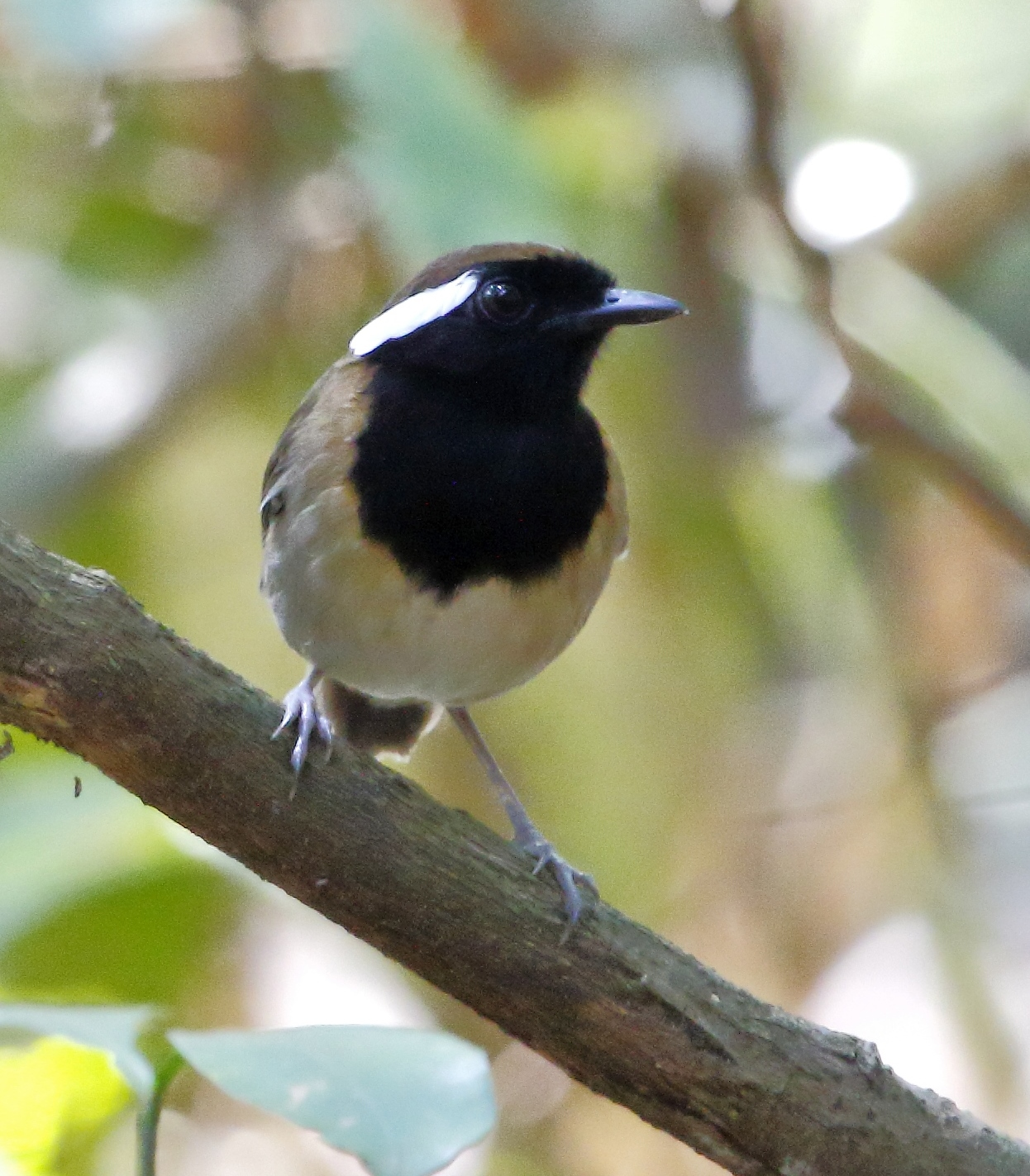
Chestnut-belted gnateater

Order: Passeriformes Family: Conopophagidae

Gnateaters are round, short-tailed and long-legged birds, which are closely related to the antbirds.

- Black-crowned antpitta, Pittasoma michleri
- Rufous-crowned antpitta, Pittasoma rufopileatum (E-SA)
- Black-bellied gnateater, Conopophaga melanogaster (E-BR)
- Black-cheeked gnateater, Conopophaga melanops (E-BR)
- Chestnut-belted gnateater, Conopophaga aurita (E-SA)
- Ash-throated gnateater, Conopophaga peruviana (E-SA)
- Ceara gnateater, Conopophaga cearae (E-BR)
- Hooded gnateater, Conopophaga roberti (E-BR)
- Rufous gnateater, Conopophaga lineata (E-SA)
- Chestnut-crowned gnateater, Conopophaga castaneiceps (E-SA)
- Slaty gnateater, Conopophaga ardesiaca (E-SA)

== Antpittas ==
Order: Passeriformes Family: Grallariidae

Antpittas resemble the true pittas with strong, longish legs, very short tails and stout bills.

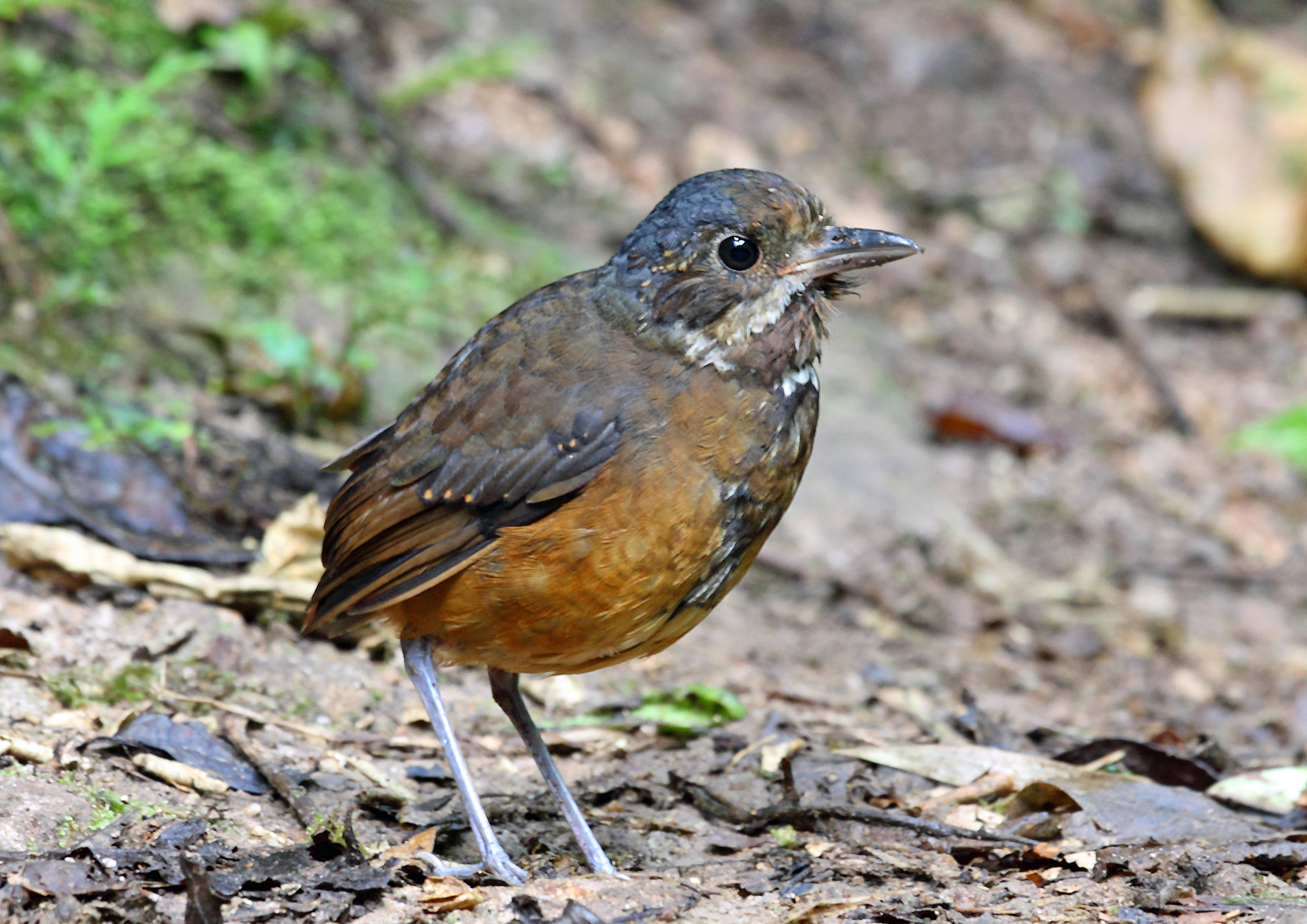
Moustached andpitta

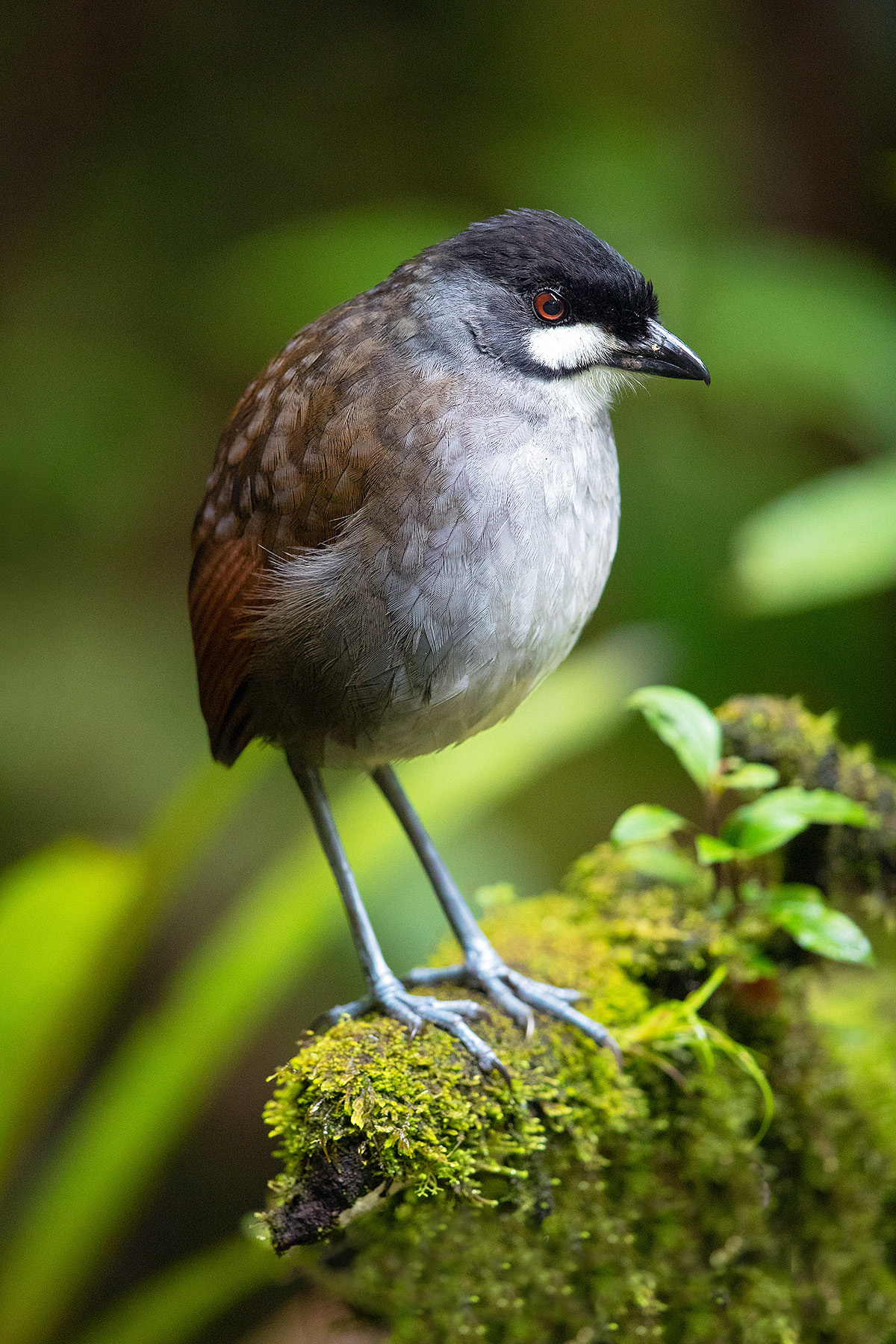
Jocotoco antpitta

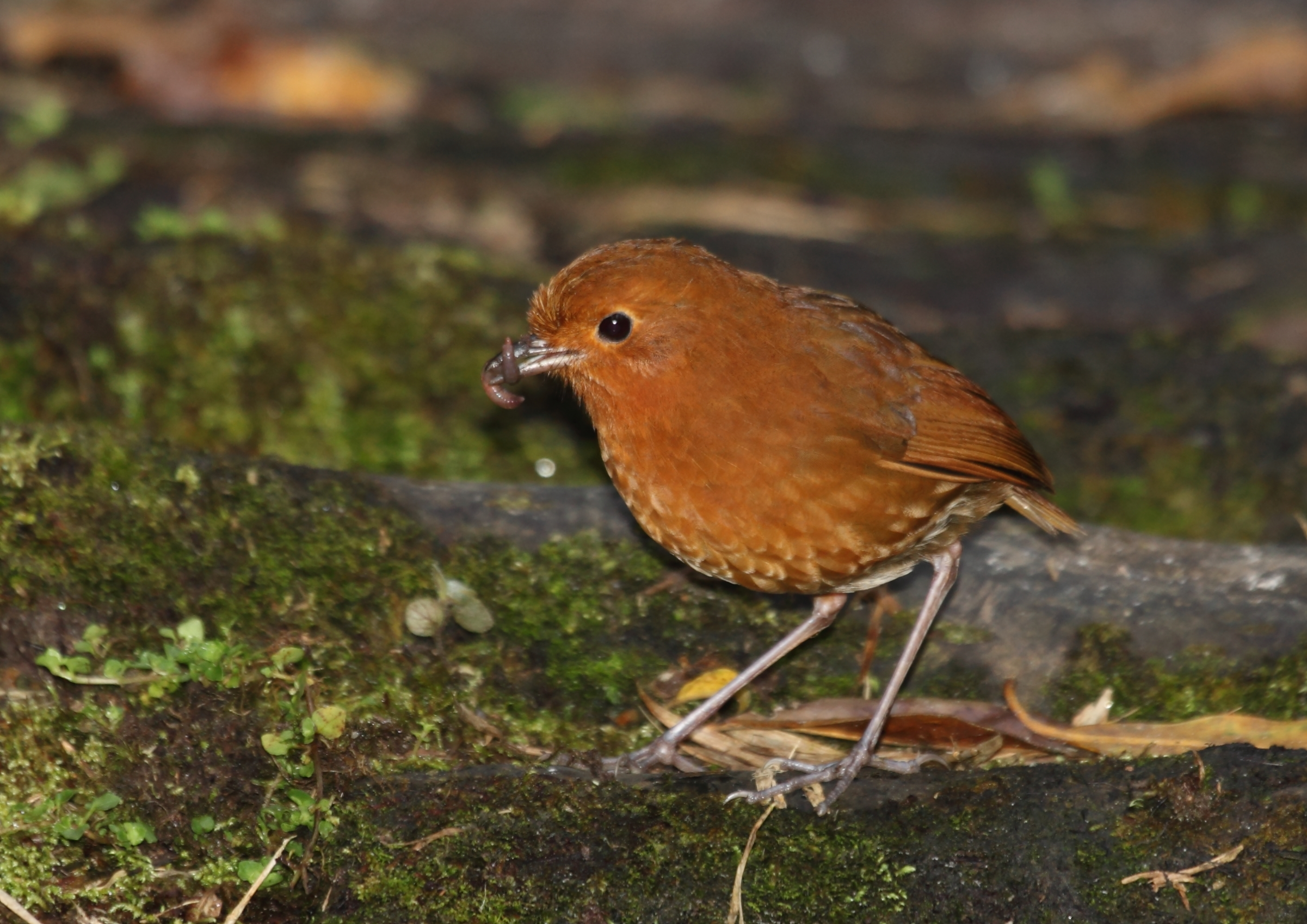
Rufous antpitta

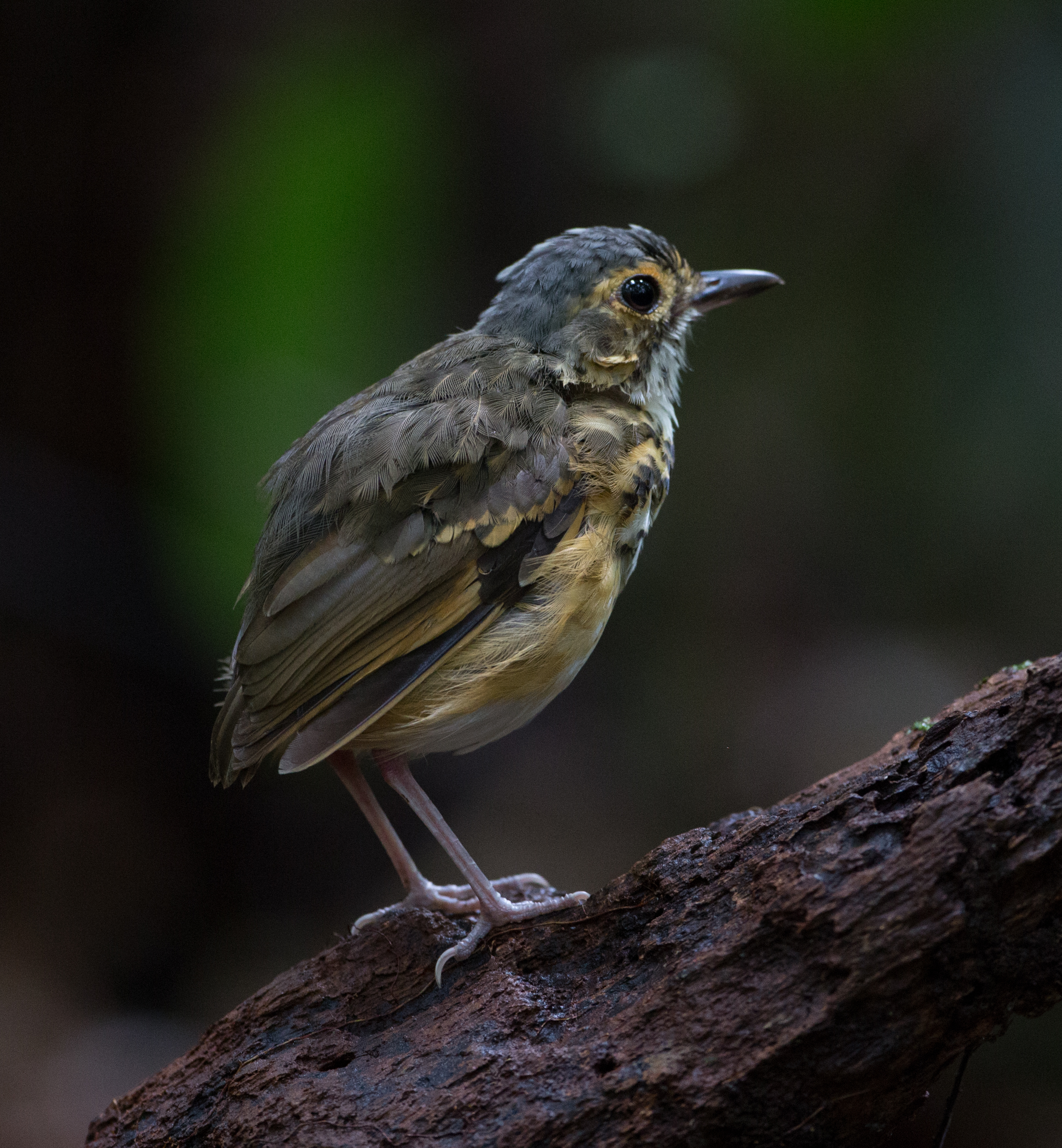
Spotted antpitta

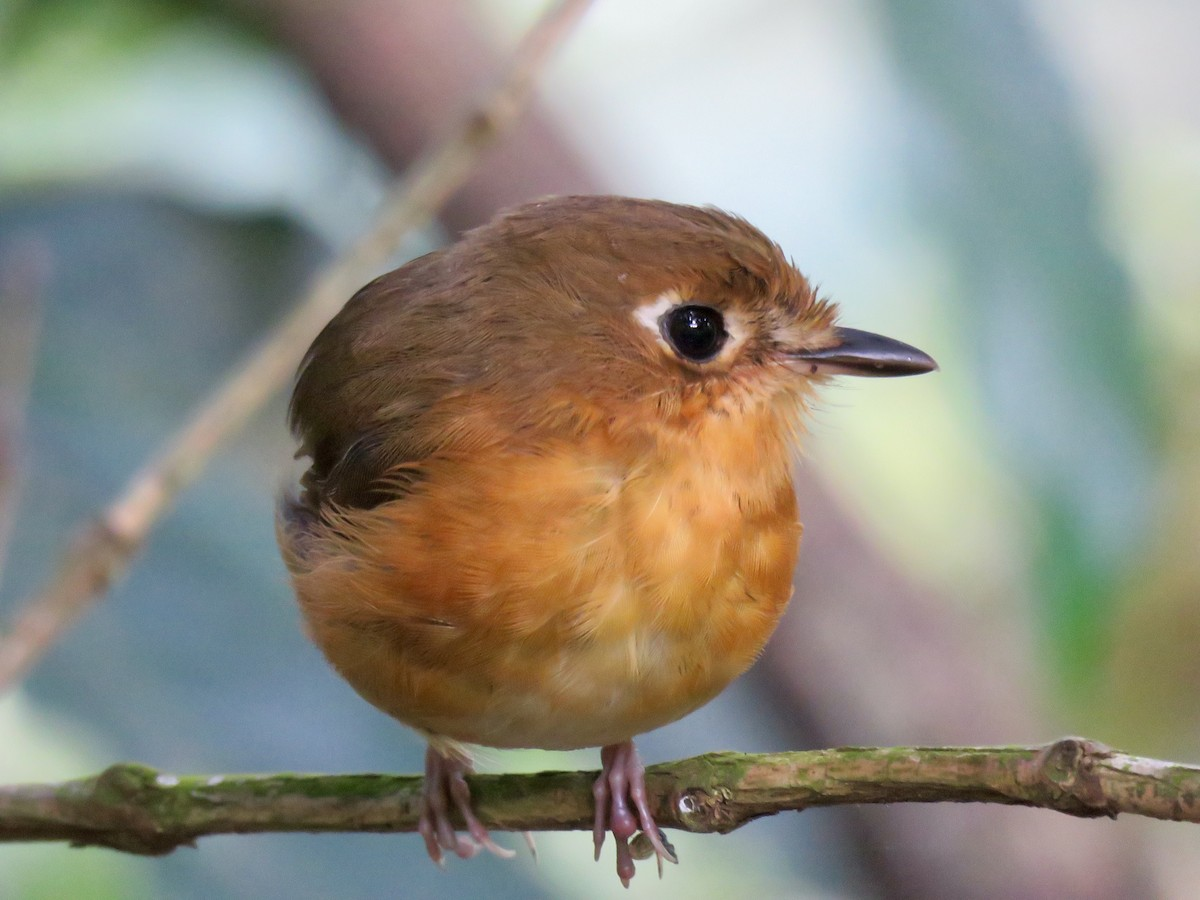
Rusty-breasted antpitta
- Undulated antpitta, Grallaria squamigera (E-SA)
- Giant antpitta, Grallaria gigantea (E-SA)
- Great antpitta, Grallaria excelsa (E-VE)
- Variegated antpitta, Grallaria varia (E-SA)
- Moustached antpitta, Grallaria alleni (E-SA)
- Scaled antpitta, Grallaria guatimalensis
- Tachira antpitta, Grallaria chthonia (E-VE)
- Plain-backed antpitta, Grallaria haplonota (E-SA)
- Ochre-striped antpitta, Grallaria dignissima (E-SA)
- Elusive antpitta, Grallaria eludens (E-SA)
- Chestnut-crowned antpitta, Grallaria ruficapilla (E-SA)
- Watkins's antpitta, Grallaria watkinsi (E-SA)
- Santa Marta antpitta, Grallaria bangsi (E-CO)
- Cundinamarca antpitta, Grallaria kaestneri (E-CO)
- Stripe-headed antpitta, Grallaria andicolus (E-SA)
- Gray-naped antpitta, Grallaria griseonucha (E-VE)
- Jocotoco antpitta, Grallaria ridgelyi (E-SA)
- Chestnut-naped antpitta, Grallaria nuchalis (E-SA)
- Pale-billed antpitta, Grallaria carrikeri (E-PE)
- White-throated antpitta, Grallaria albigula (E-SA)
- Yellow-breasted antpitta, Grallaria flavotincta (E-SA)
- White-bellied antpitta, Grallaria hypoleuca (E-SA)
- Rusty-tinged antpitta, Grallaria przewalskii (E-PE)
- Bay antpitta, Grallaria capitalis (E-PE)
- Red-and-white antpitta, Grallaria erythroleuca (E-PE)
- Sierra Nevada antpitta, Grallaria spatiator (E-CO)
- Perija antpitta, Grallaria saltuensis (E-SA)
- Bicolored antpitta, Grallaria rufocinerea (E-SA)
- Muisca antpitta, Grallaria rufula (E-SA)
- Chami antpitta, Grallaria alvarezi (E-CO)
- Equatorial antpitta, Grallaria saturata (E-SA)
- Chestnut antpitta, Grallaria blakei (E-PE)
- Urubamba antpitta, Grallaria occabambae (E-PE)
- Bolivian antpitta, Grallaria cochabambae (E-BO)
- Cajamarca antpitta, Grallaria cajamarcae (E-PE)
- Graves's antpitta, Grallaria gravesi (E-PE)
- O'Neill's antpitta, Grallaria oneilli (E-PE)
- Junin antpitta, Grallaria obscura (E-PE)
- Oxapampa antpitta, Grallaria centralis (E-PE)
- Ayacucho antpitta, Grallaria ayacuchensis (E-PE)
- Puno antpitta, Grallaria sinaensis (E-SA)
- Tawny antpitta, Grallaria quitensis (E-SA)
- Urrao antpitta, Grallaria urraoensis (E-CO)
- Brown-banded antpitta, Grallaria milleri (E-CO)
- Rufous-faced antpitta, Grallaria erythrotis (E-SA)
- Speckle-breasted antpitta, Cryptopezus nattereri (E-SA)
- Ochre-breasted antpitta, Grallaricula flavirostris
- Crescent-faced antpitta, Grallaricula lineifrons (E-SA)
- Leymebamba antpitta, Grallaricula leymebambae (E-SA)
- Scallop-breasted antpitta, Grallaricula loricata (E-VE)
- Hooded antpitta, Grallaricula cucullata (E-SA)
- Peruvian antpitta, Grallaricula peruviana (E-SA)
- Ochre-fronted antpitta, Grallaricula ochraceifrons (E-PE)
- Rusty-breasted antpitta, Grallaricula ferrugineipectus (E-SA)
- Slate-crowned antpitta, Grallaricula nana (E-SA)
- Sucre antpitta, Grallaricula cumanensis (E-VE)
- Masked antpitta, Hylopezus auricularis (E-BO)
- White-browed antpitta, Hylopezus ochroleucus (E-BR)
- Streak-chested antpitta, Hylopezus perspicillatus
- Spotted antpitta, Hylopezus macularius (E-SA)
- Alta Floresta antpitta, Hylopezus whittakeri (E-BR)
- Snethlage's antpitta, Hylopezus paraensis (E-BR)
- White-lored antpitta, Myrmothera fulviventris (E-SA)
- Amazonian antpitta, Myrmothera berlepschi (E-SA)
- Thicket antpitta, Myrmothera dives
- Thrush-like antpitta, Myrmothera campanisona (E-SA)
- Tepui antpitta, Myrmothera simplex (E-SA)
- Tapajos antpitta, Myrmothera subcanescens (E-BR)

== Tapaculos ==
Order: Passeriformes Family: Rhinocryptidae

Tapaculos are small suboscine passeriform birds with numerous species in South and Central America. They are terrestrial species that fly only poorly on their short wings. They have strong legs, well-suited to their habitat of grassland or forest undergrowth. The tail is cocked and pointed towards the head.

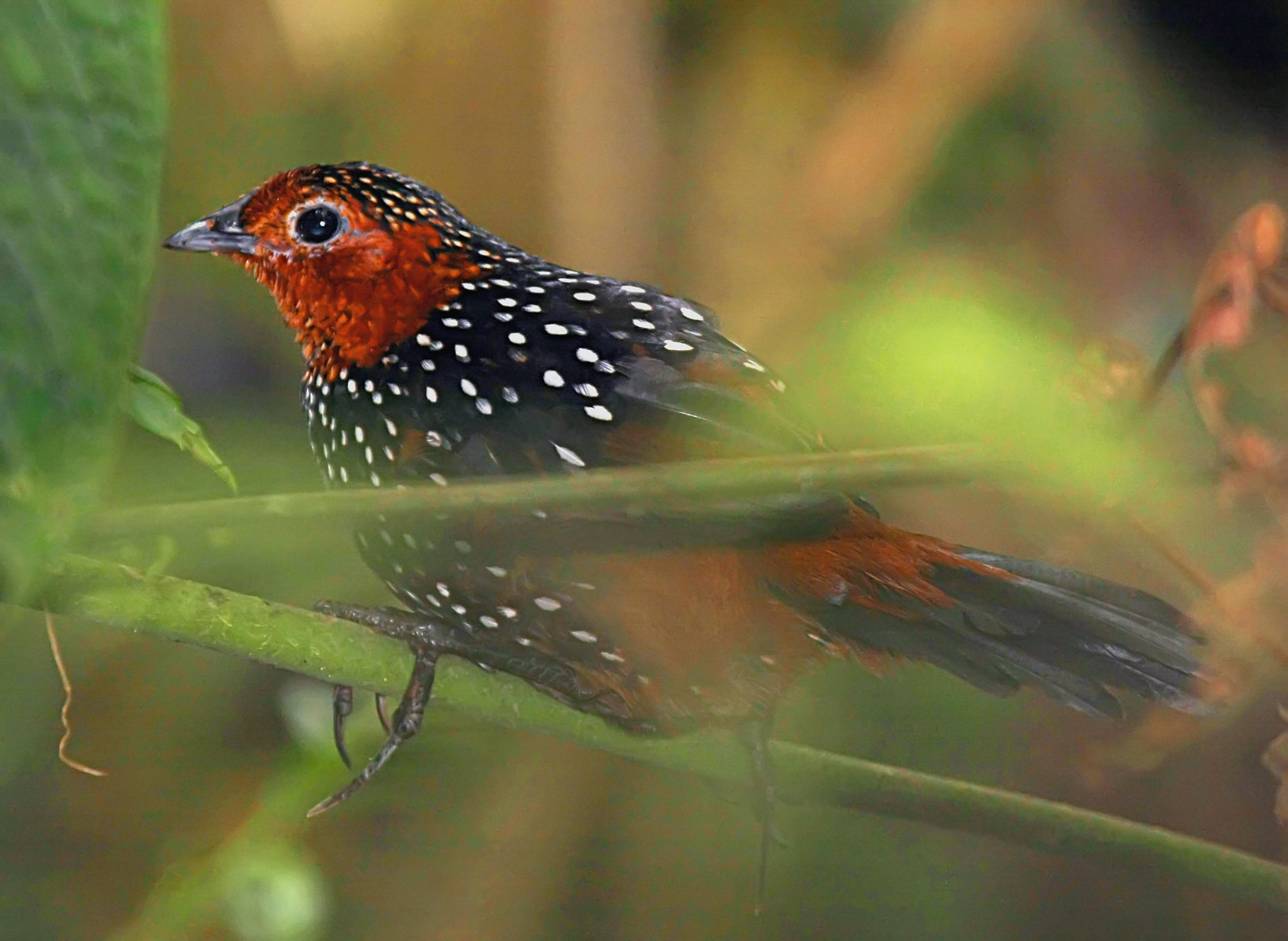
Ocellated tapaculo

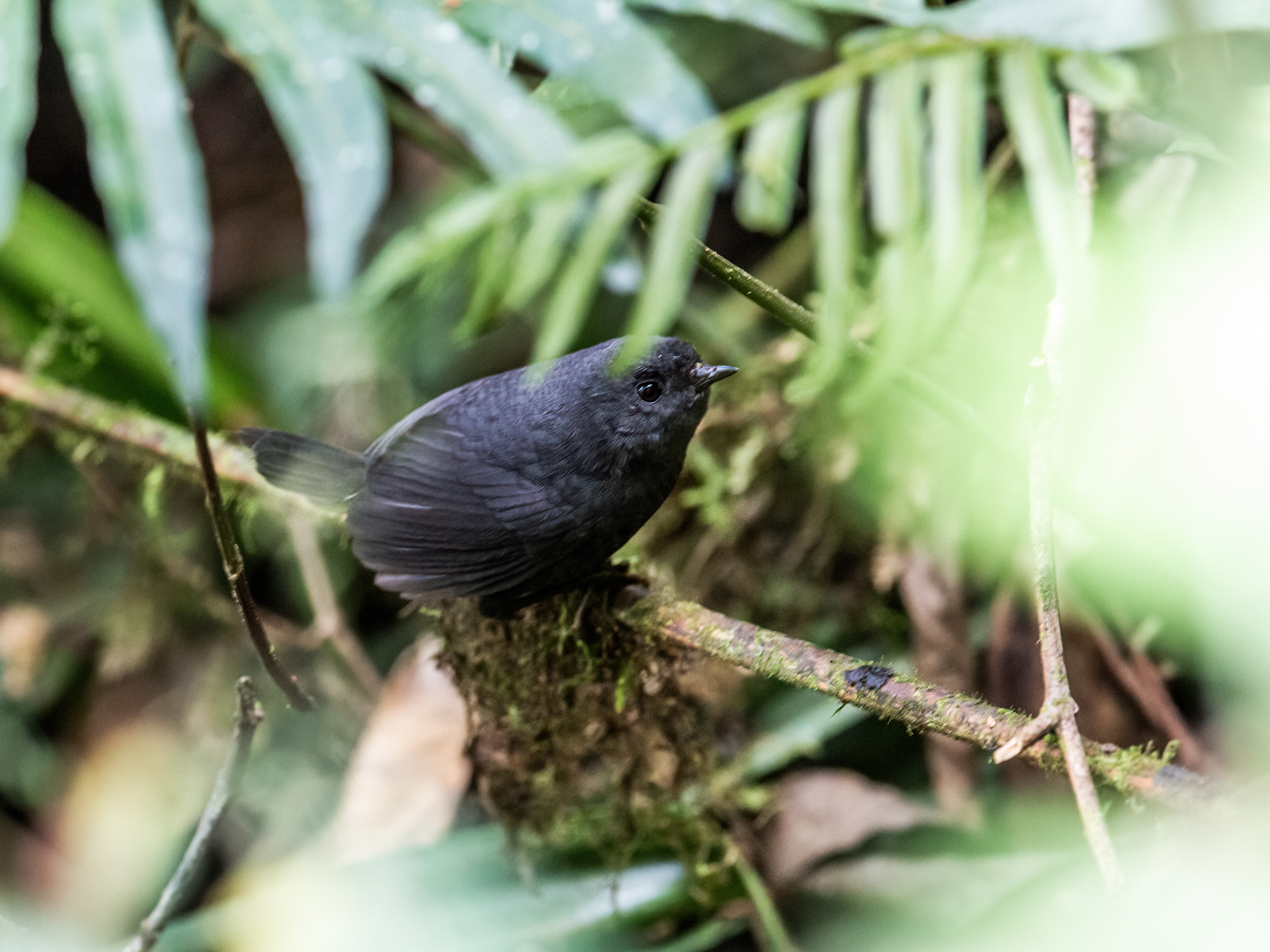
Trilling tapaculo

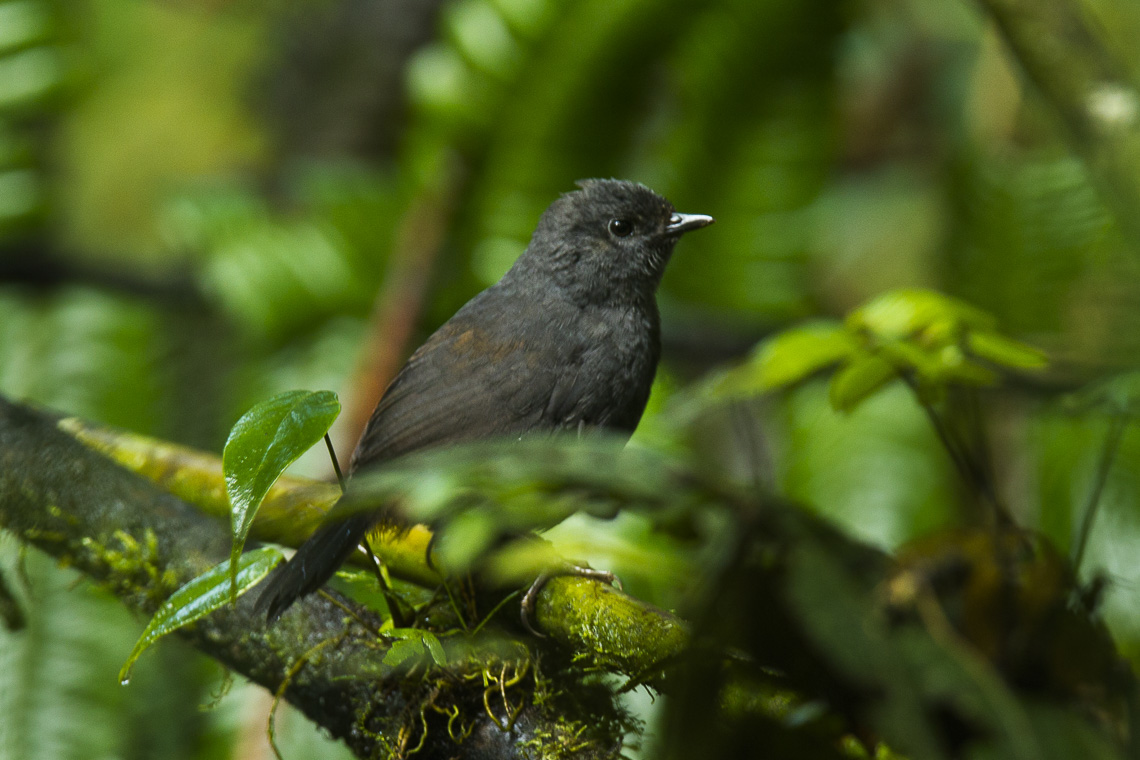
Long-tailed tapaculo

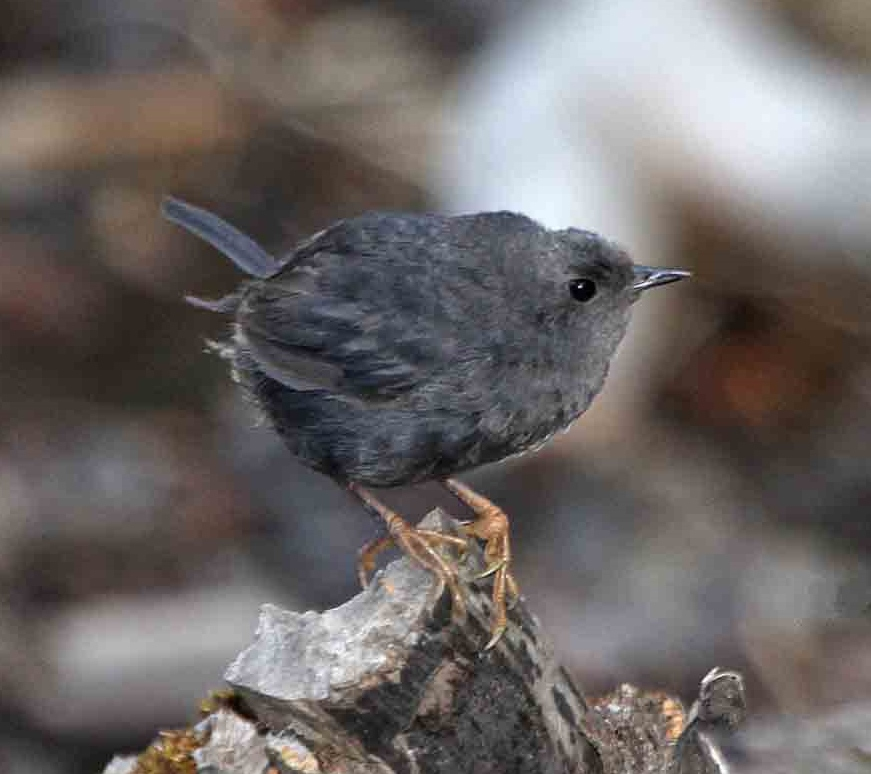
Magellanic tapaculo

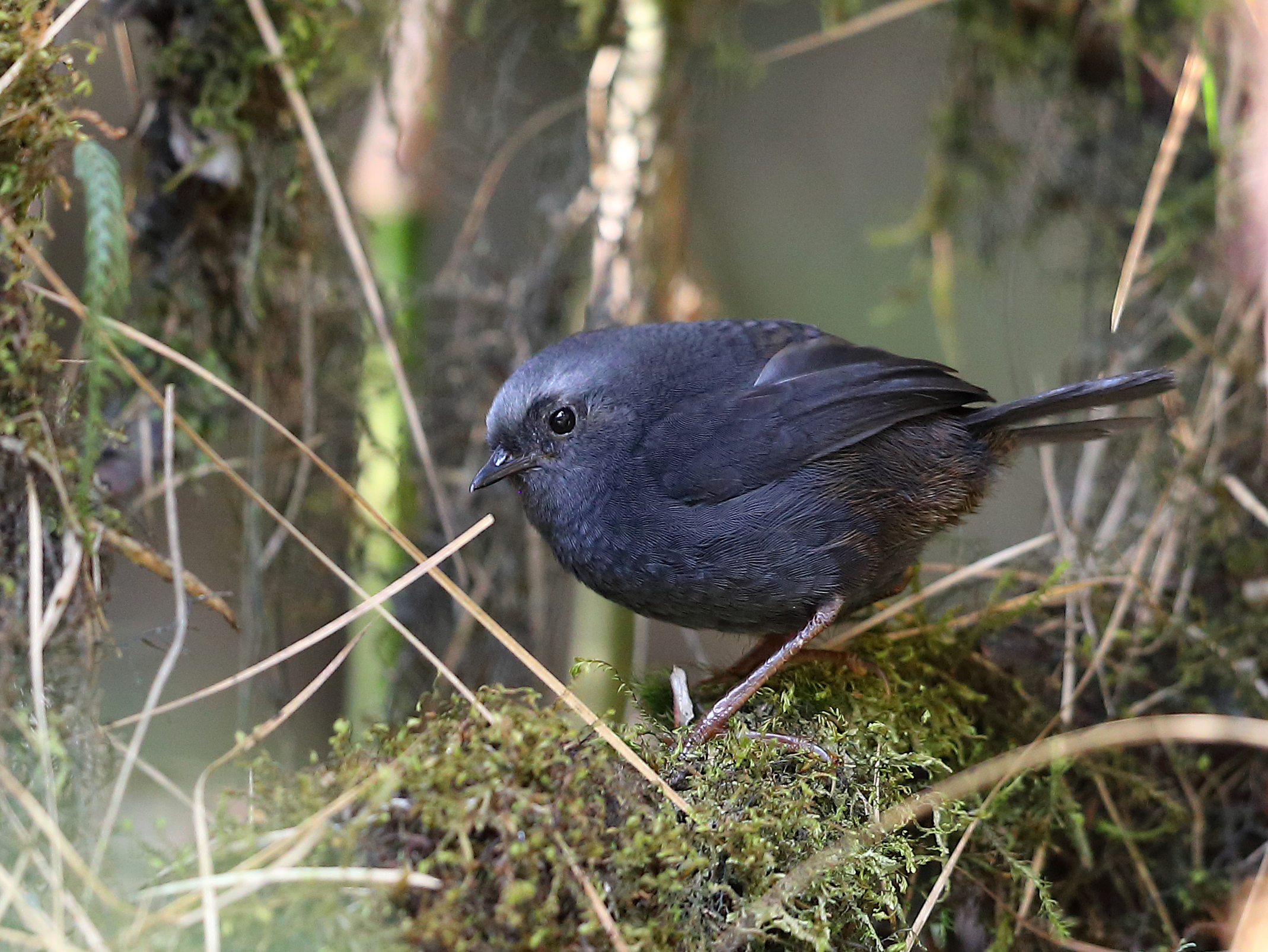
Diademed tapaculo
- Spotted bamboowren, Psilorhamphus guttatus (E-SA)
- Rusty-belted tapaculo, Liosceles thoracicus (E-SA)
- Ocellated tapaculo, Acropternis orthonyx (E-SA)
- Crested gallito, Rhinocrypta lanceolata (E-SA)
- Sandy gallito, Teledromas fuscus (E-AR)
- Chestnut-throated huet-huet, Pteroptochos castaneus (E-SA)
- Black-throated huet-huet, Pteroptochos tarnii (E-SA)
- Moustached turca, Pteroptochos megapodius (E-CH)
- White-throated tapaculo, Scelorchilus albicollis (E-CH)
- Chucao tapaculo, Scelorchilus rubecula (E-SA)
- Slaty bristlefront, Merulaxis ater (E-BR)
- Stresemann's bristlefront, Merulaxis stresemanni (E-BR)
- Bahia tapaculo, Eleoscytalopus psychopompus (E-BR)
- White-breasted tapaculo, Eleoscytalopus indigoticus (E-BR)
- Ochre-flanked tapaculo, Eugralla paradoxa (E-SA)
- Ash-colored tapaculo, Myornis senilis (E-SA)
- Marsh tapaculo, Scytalopus iraiensis (E-BR)
- Diamantina tapaculo, Scytalopus diamantinensis (E-BR)
- Brasilia tapaculo, Scytalopus novacapitalis (E-BR)
- Rock tapaculo, Scytalopus petrophilus (E-BR)
- Planalto tapaculo, Scytalopus pachecoi (E-SA)
- Boa Nova tapaculo, Scytalopus gonzagai (E-BR)
- Mouse-colored tapaculo, Scytalopus speluncae (E-BR)
- Dusky tapaculo, Scytalopus fuscus (E-CH)
- Magellanic tapaculo, Scytalopus magellanicus (E-SA)
- Ancash tapaculo, Scytalopus affinis (E-PE)
- White-winged tapaculo, Scytalopus krabbei (E-PE)
- Loja tapaculo, Scytalopus androstictus (E-SA)
- Paramo tapaculo, Scytalopus opacus (E-SA)
- Paramillo tapaculo, Scytalopus canus (E-CO)
- White-browed tapaculo, Scytalopus superciliaris (E-AR)
- Zimmer's tapaculo, Scytalopus zimmeri (E-SA)
- Puna tapaculo, Scytalopus simonsi (E-SA)
- Diademed tapaculo, Scytalopus schulenbergi (E-SA)
- Vilcabamba tapaculo, Scytalopus urubambae (E-PE)
- Ampay tapaculo, Scytalopus whitneyi (E-PE)
- Jalca tapaculo, Scytalopus frankeae (E-PE)
- Neblina tapaculo, Scytalopus altirostris (E-PE)
- Trilling tapaculo, Scytalopus parvirostris (E-SA)
- Bolivian tapaculo, Scytalopus bolivianus (E-SA)
- White-crowned tapaculo, Scytalopus atratus (E-SA)
- Santa Marta tapaculo, Scytalopus sanctaemartae (E-CO)
- Long-tailed tapaculo, Scytalopus micropterus (E-SA)
- Rufous-vented tapaculo, Scytalopus femoralis (E-PE)
- Utcubamba tapaculo, Scytalopus intermedius (E-PE)
- Large-footed tapaculo, Scytalopus macropus (E-PE)
- Junin tapaculo, Scytalopus gettyae (E-PE)
- Unicolored tapaculo, Scytalopus unicolor (E-PE)
- Tschudi's tapaculo, Scytalopus acutirostris (E-PE)
- Blackish tapaculo, Scytalopus latrans (E-SA)
- Nariño tapaculo, Scytalopus vicinior (E-SA)
- Tacarcuna tapaculo, Scytalopus panamensis
- Choco tapaculo, Scytalopus chocoensis
- Magdalena tapaculo, Scytalopus rodriguezi (E-CO)
- Stiles's tapaculo, Scytalopus stilesi (E-CO)
- Tatama tapaculo, Scytalopus alvarezlopezi (E-CO)
- Ecuadorian tapaculo, Scytalopus robbinsi (E-EC)
- Caracas tapaculo, Scytalopus caracae (E-VE)
- Pale-bellied tapaculo, Scytalopus griseicollis (E-SA)
- Brown-rumped tapaculo, Scytalopus latebricola (E-CO)
- Perija tapaculo, Scytalopus perijanus (E-SA)
- Merida tapaculo, Scytalopus meridanus (E-VE)
- Chusquea tapaculo, Scytalopus parkeri (E-SA)
- Spillmann's tapaculo, Scytalopus spillmanni (E-SA)

== Antthrushes ==
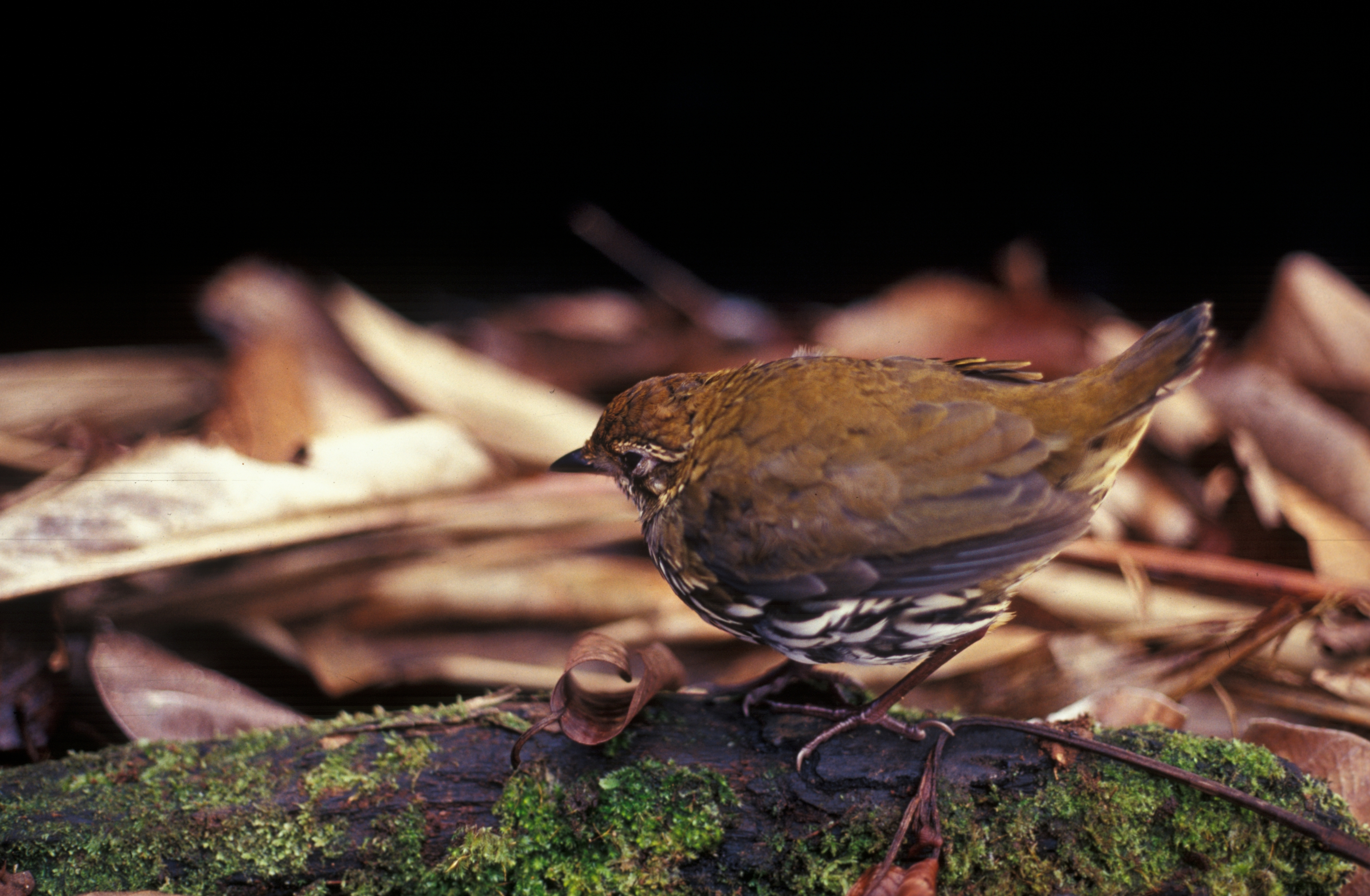
Striated antthrush

Order: Passeriformes Family: Formicariidae

Antthrushes resemble small rails.

- Rufous-capped antthrush, Formicarius colma (E-SA)
- Black-faced antthrush, Formicarius analis
- Rufous-fronted antthrush, Formicarius rufifrons (E-SA)
- Black-hooded antthrush, Formicarius destructus (E-SA)
- Rufous-breasted antthrush, Formicarius rufipectus
- Short-tailed antthrush, Chamaeza campanisona (E-SA)
- Striated antthrush, Chamaeza nobilis (E-SA)
- Such's antthrush, Chamaeza meruloides (E-BR)
- Schwartz's antthrush, Chamaeza turdina (E-SA)
- Rufous-tailed antthrush, Chamaeza ruficauda (E-SA)
- Barred antthrush, Chamaeza mollissima (E-SA)

== Ovenbirds ==
Order: Passeriformes Family: Furnariidae

Ovenbirds comprise a large family of small sub-oscine passerine bird species found in Central and South America. They are a diverse group of insectivores which gets its name from the elaborate "oven-like" clay nests built by some species, although others build stick nests or nest in tunnels or clefts in rock. The woodcreepers are brownish birds which maintain an upright vertical posture, supported by their stiff tail vanes. They feed mainly on insects taken from tree trunks.

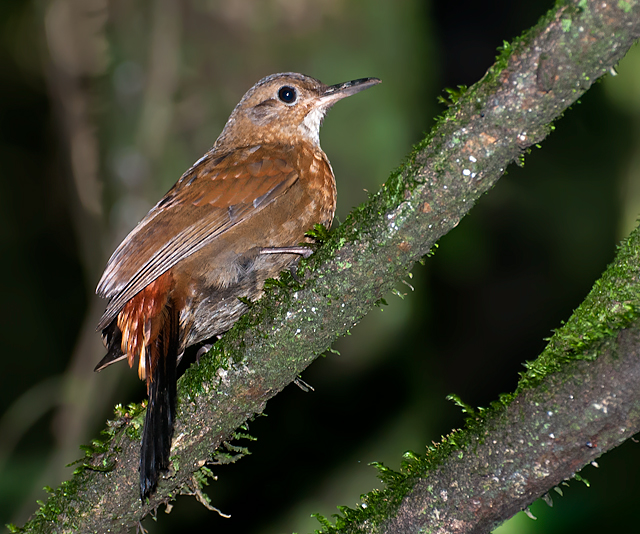
Rufous-breasted leaftosser

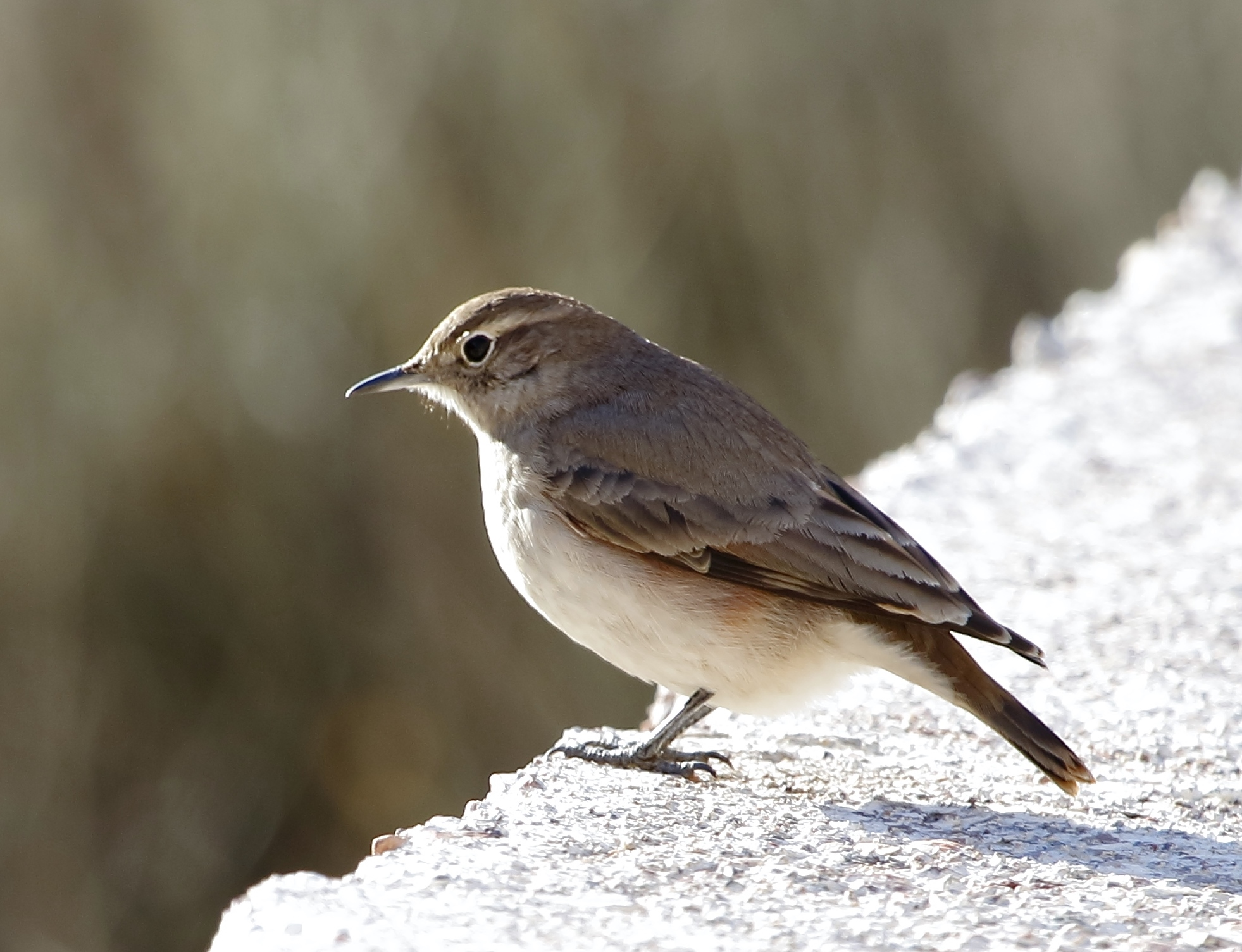
Rufous-banded miner

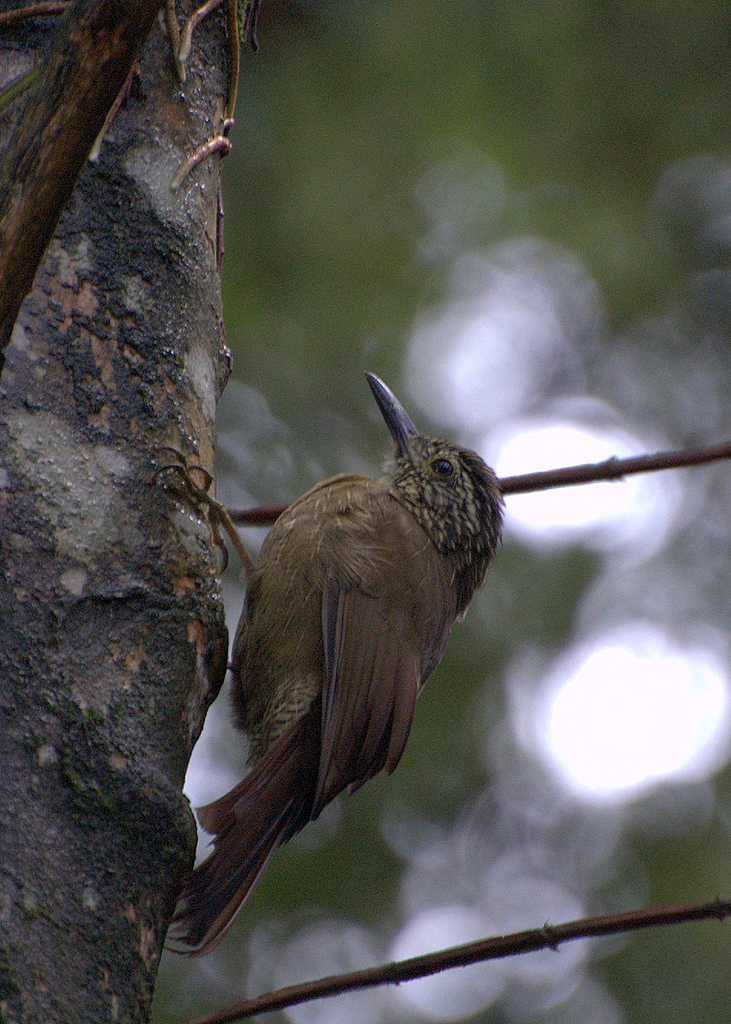
Planalto woodcreeper

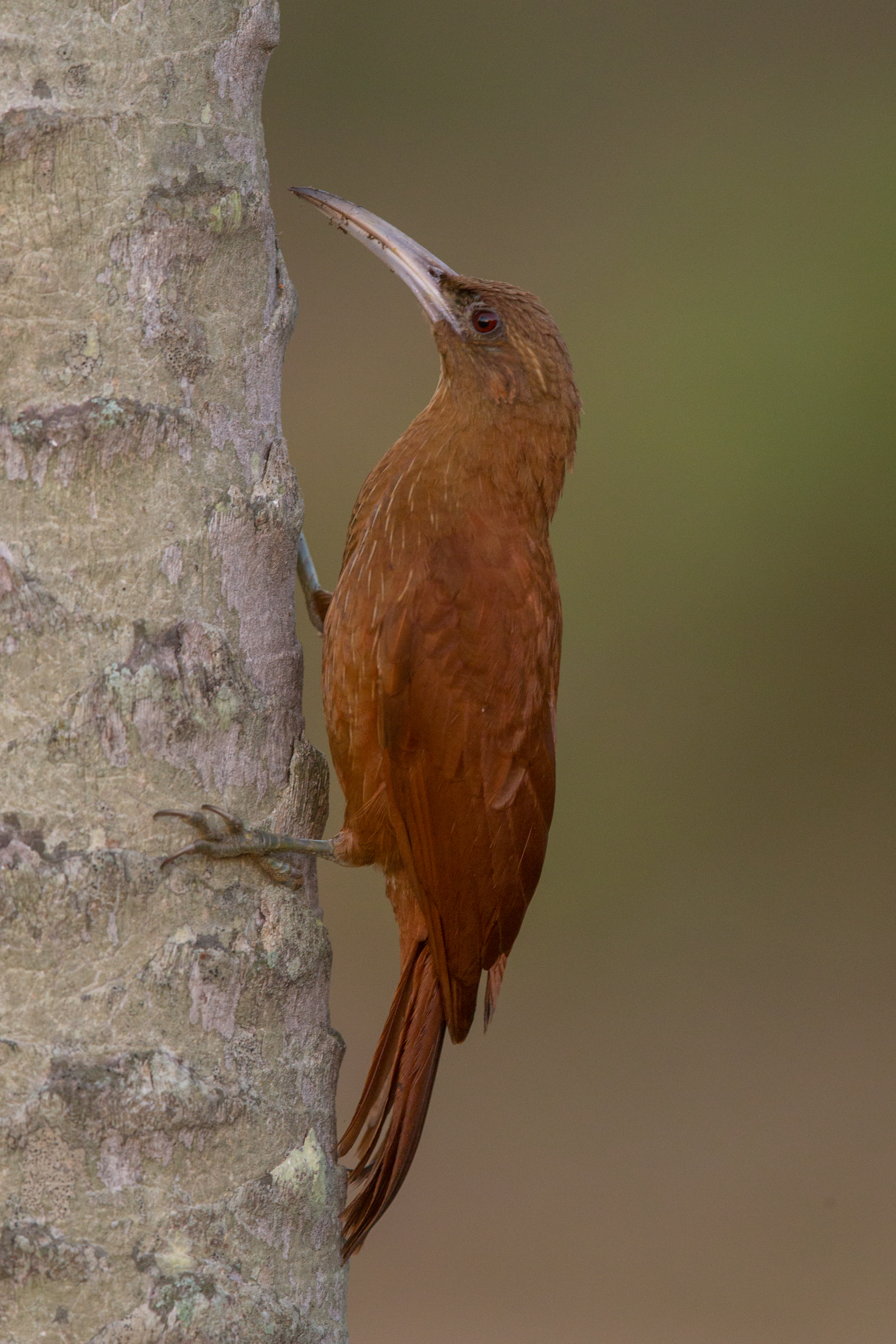
Great rufous woodcreeper

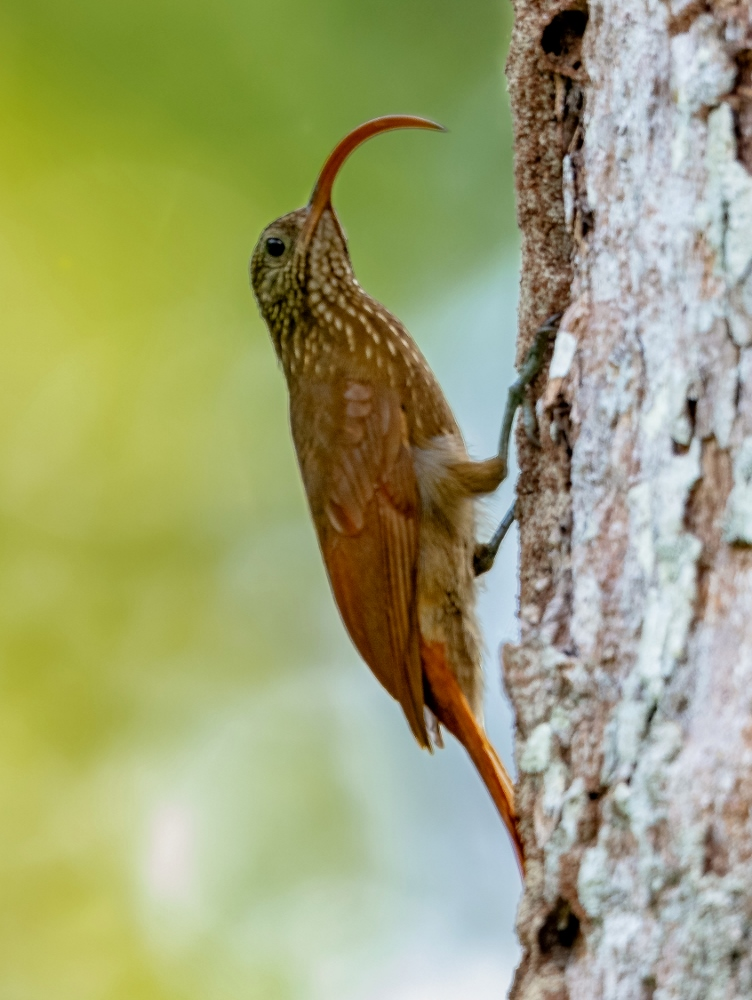
Curve-billed scythebill

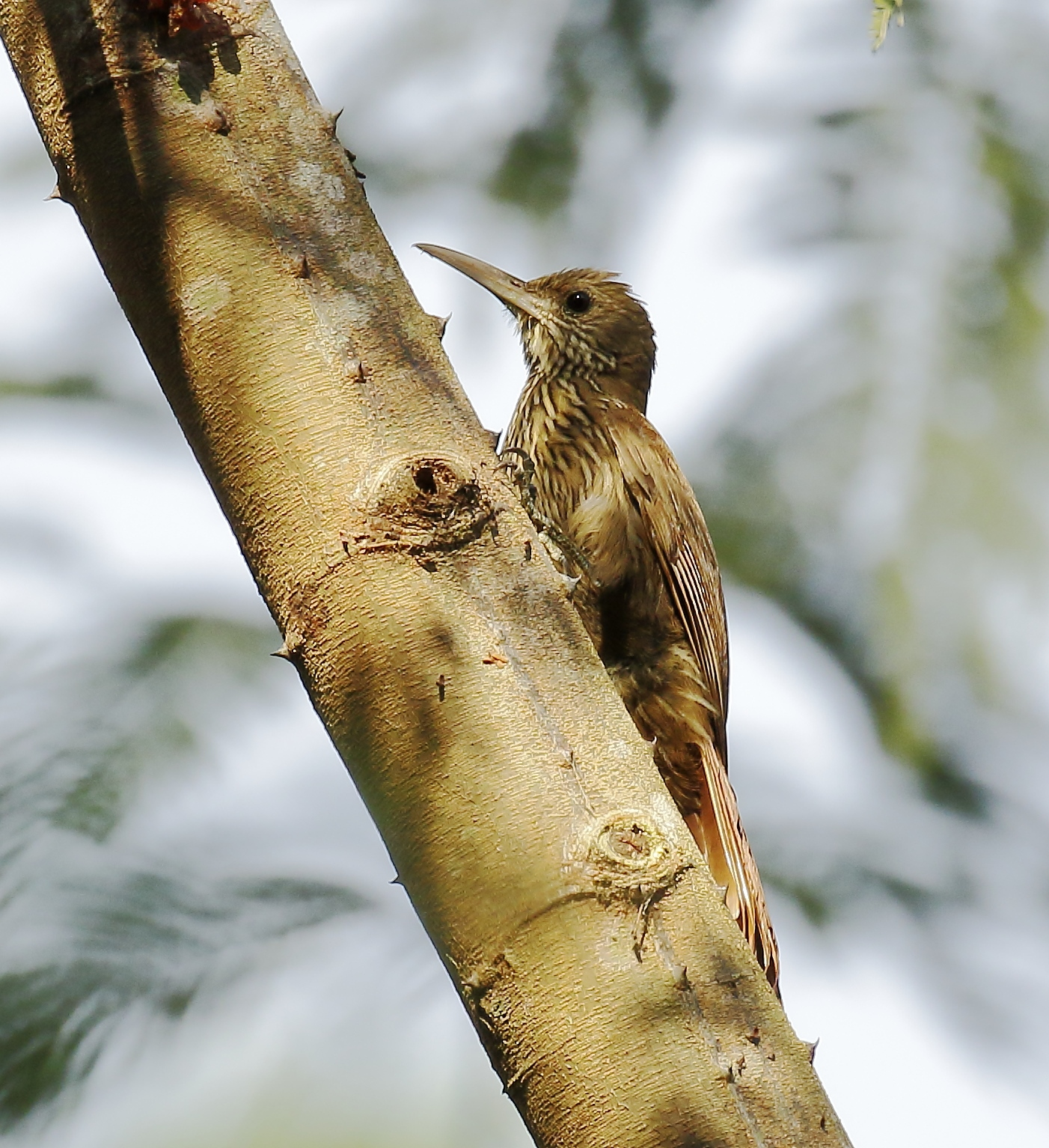
Inambari woodcreeper

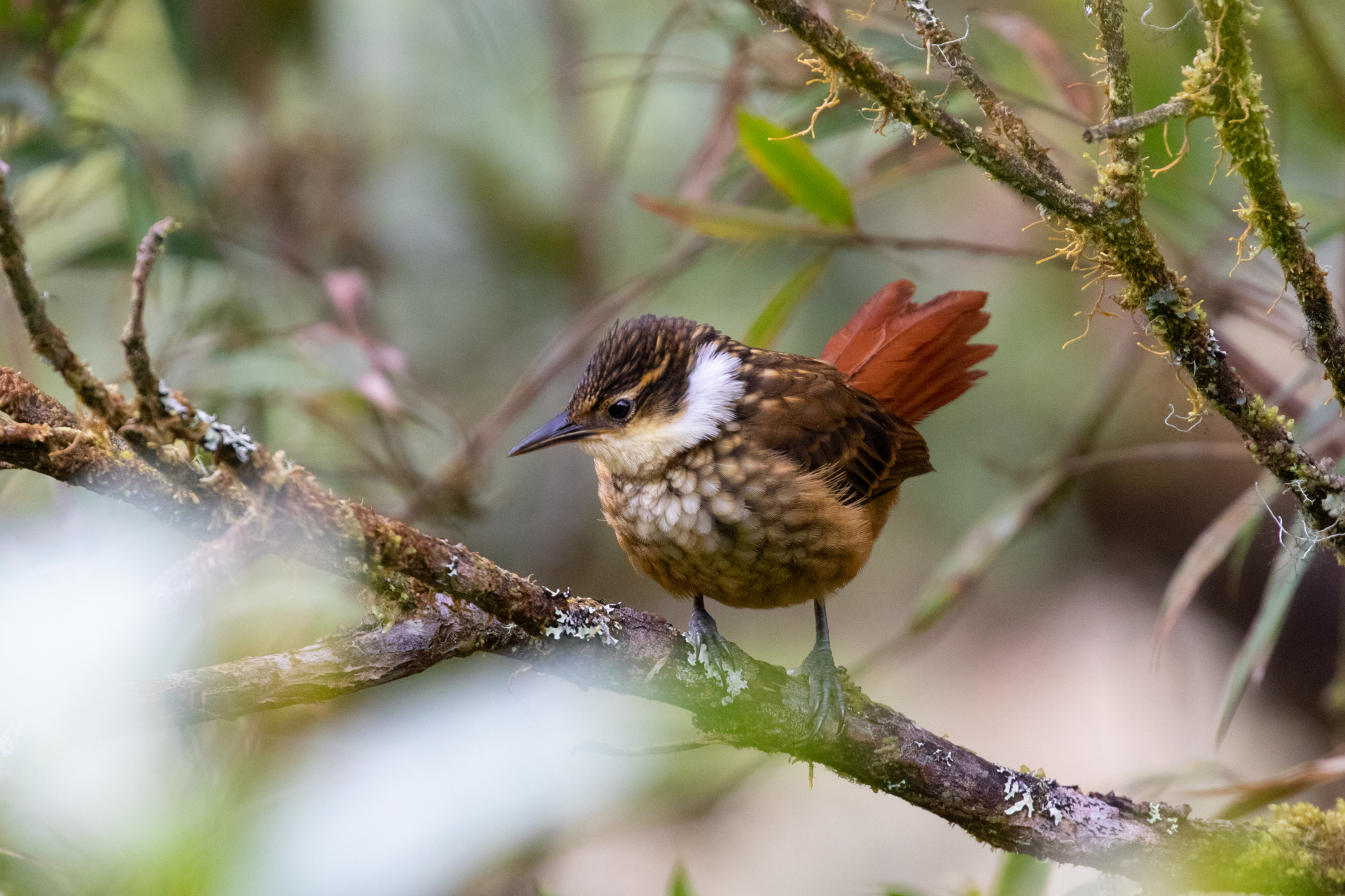
Streaked tuftedcheek

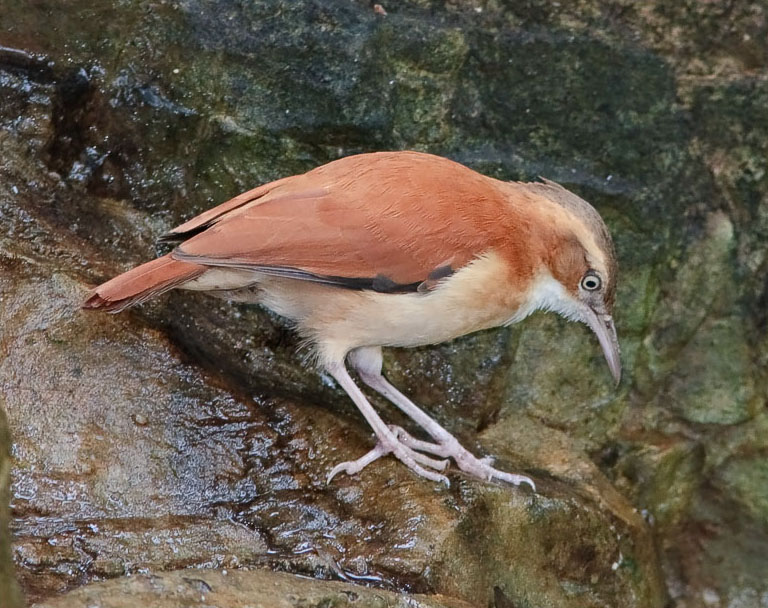
Pale-legged hornero

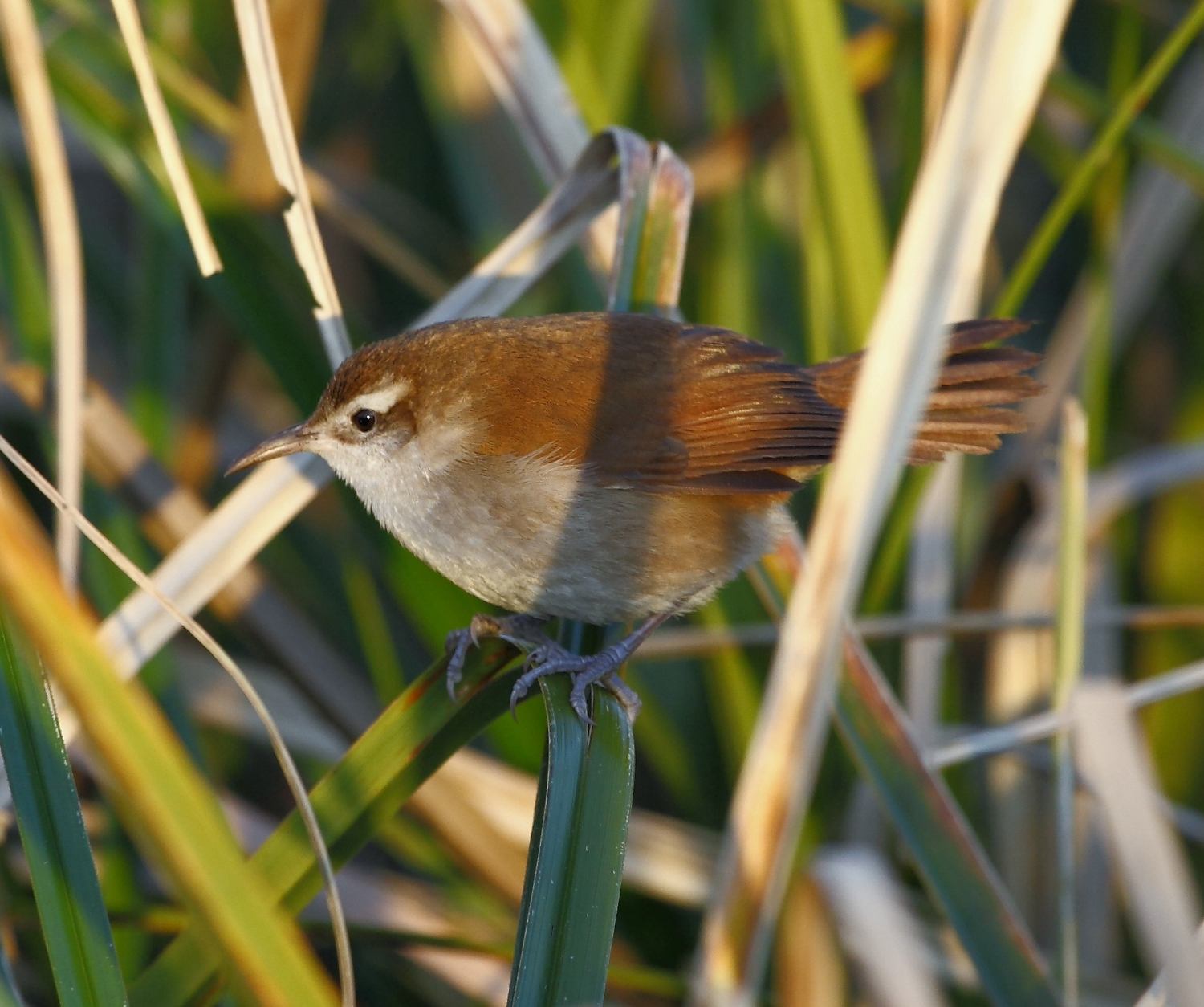
Curve-billed reedhaunter

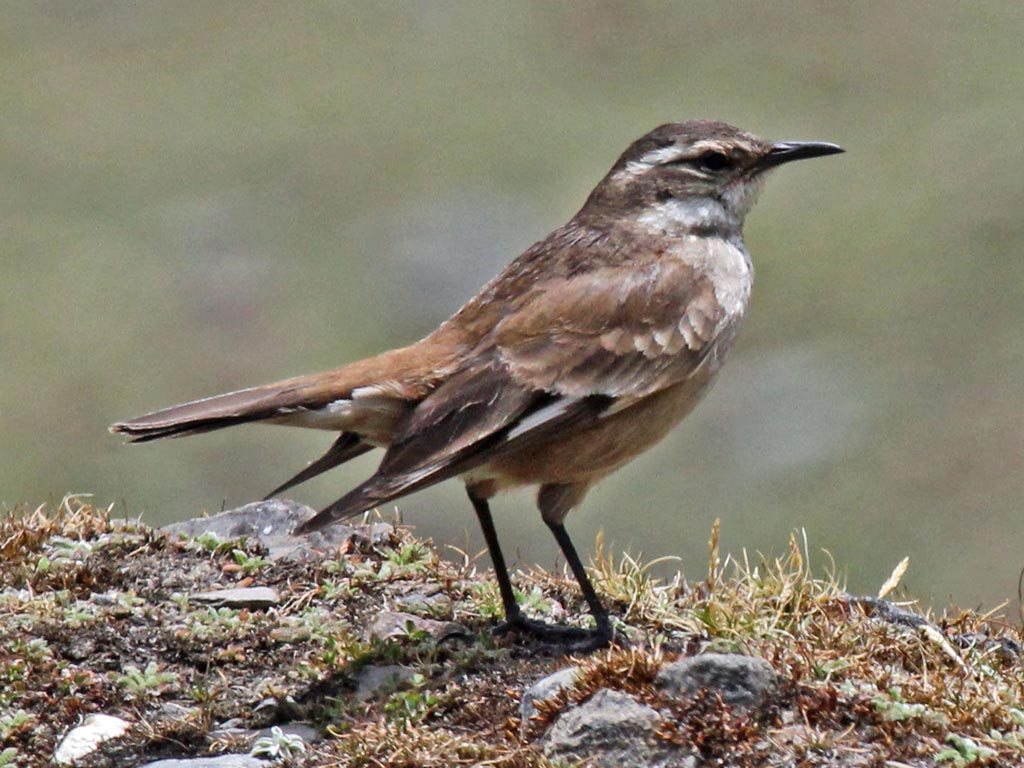
Cream-winged cinclodes

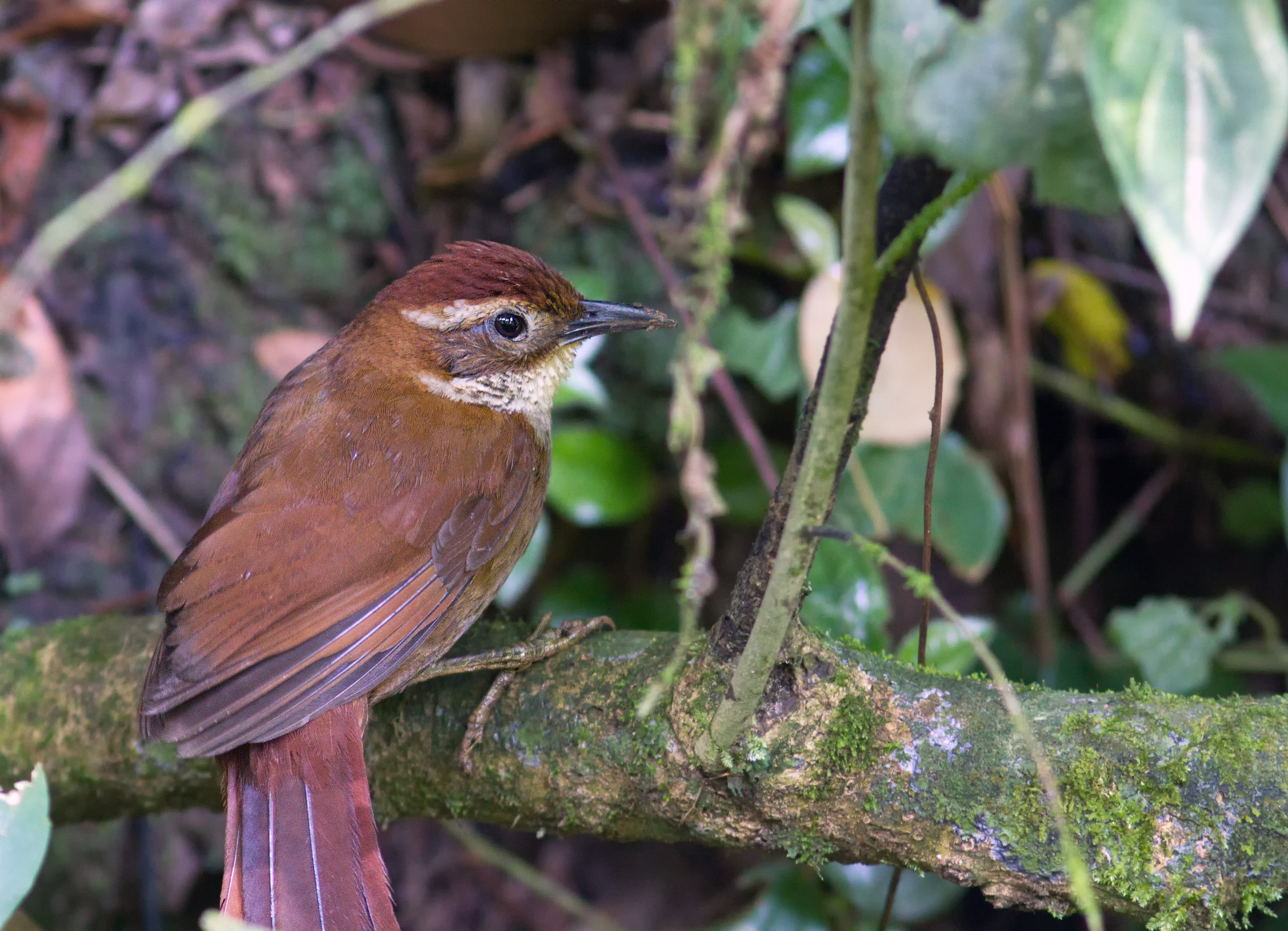
Canebrake groundcreeper

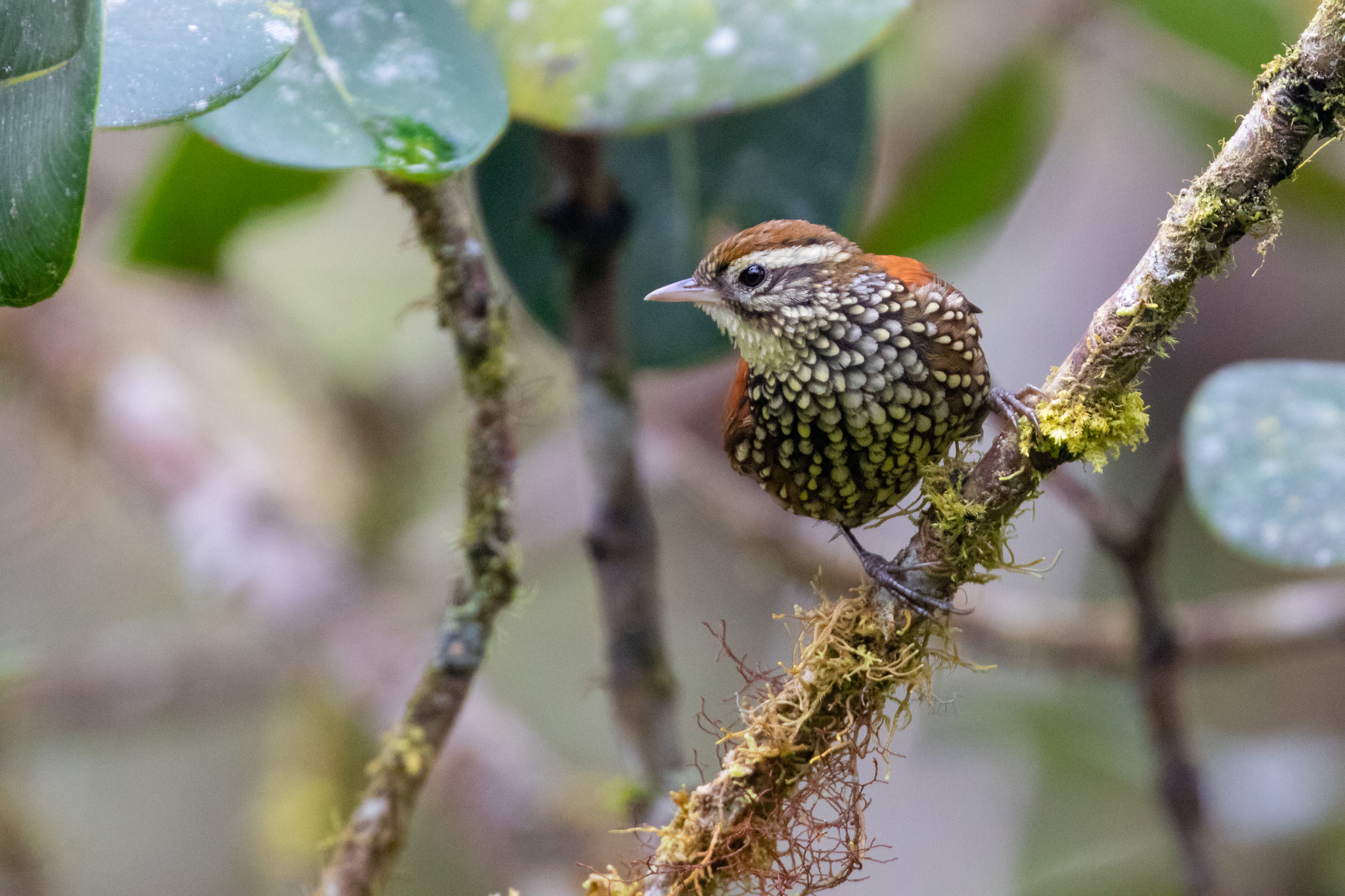
Pearled treerunner

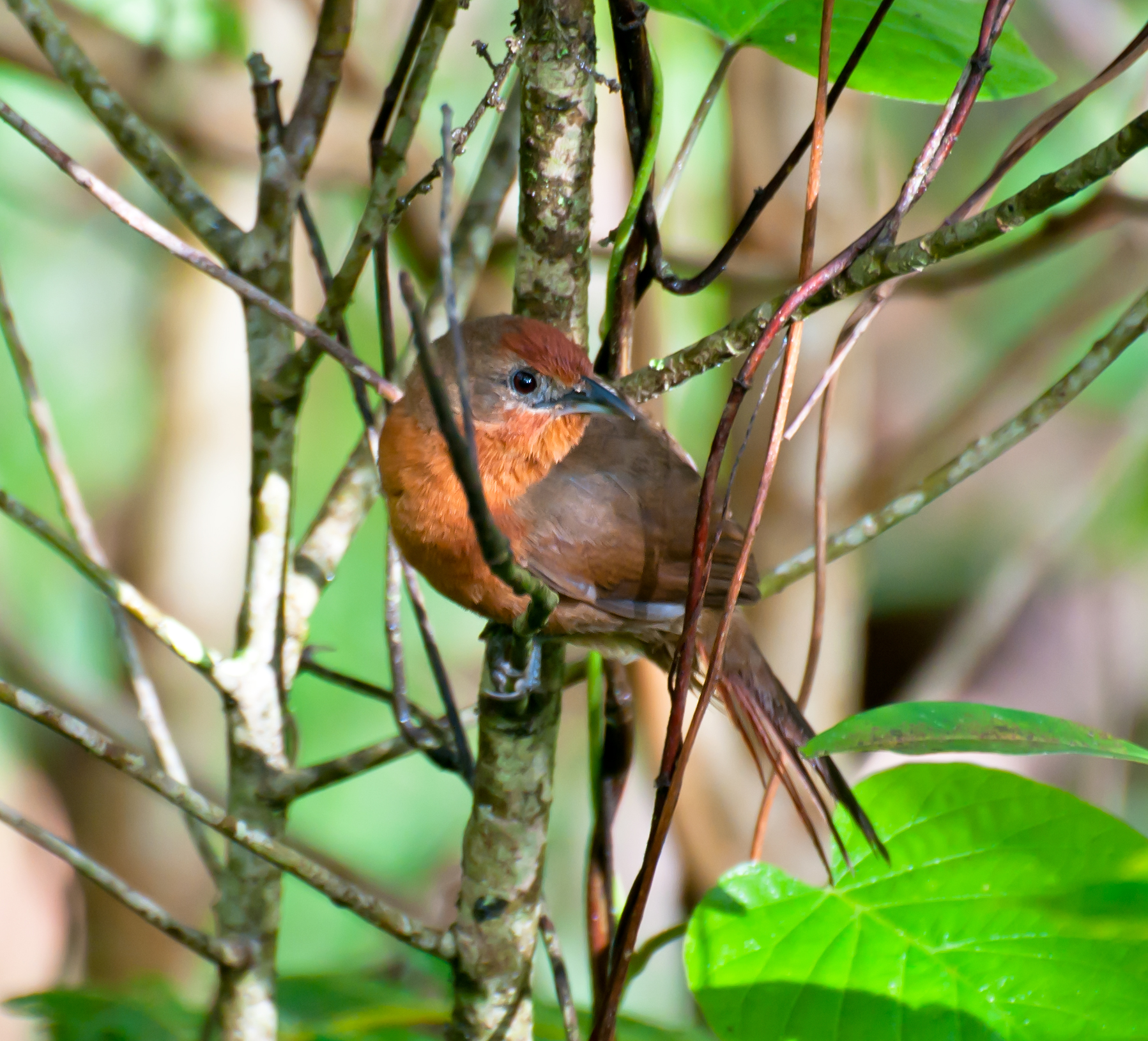
Orange-breasted thornbird

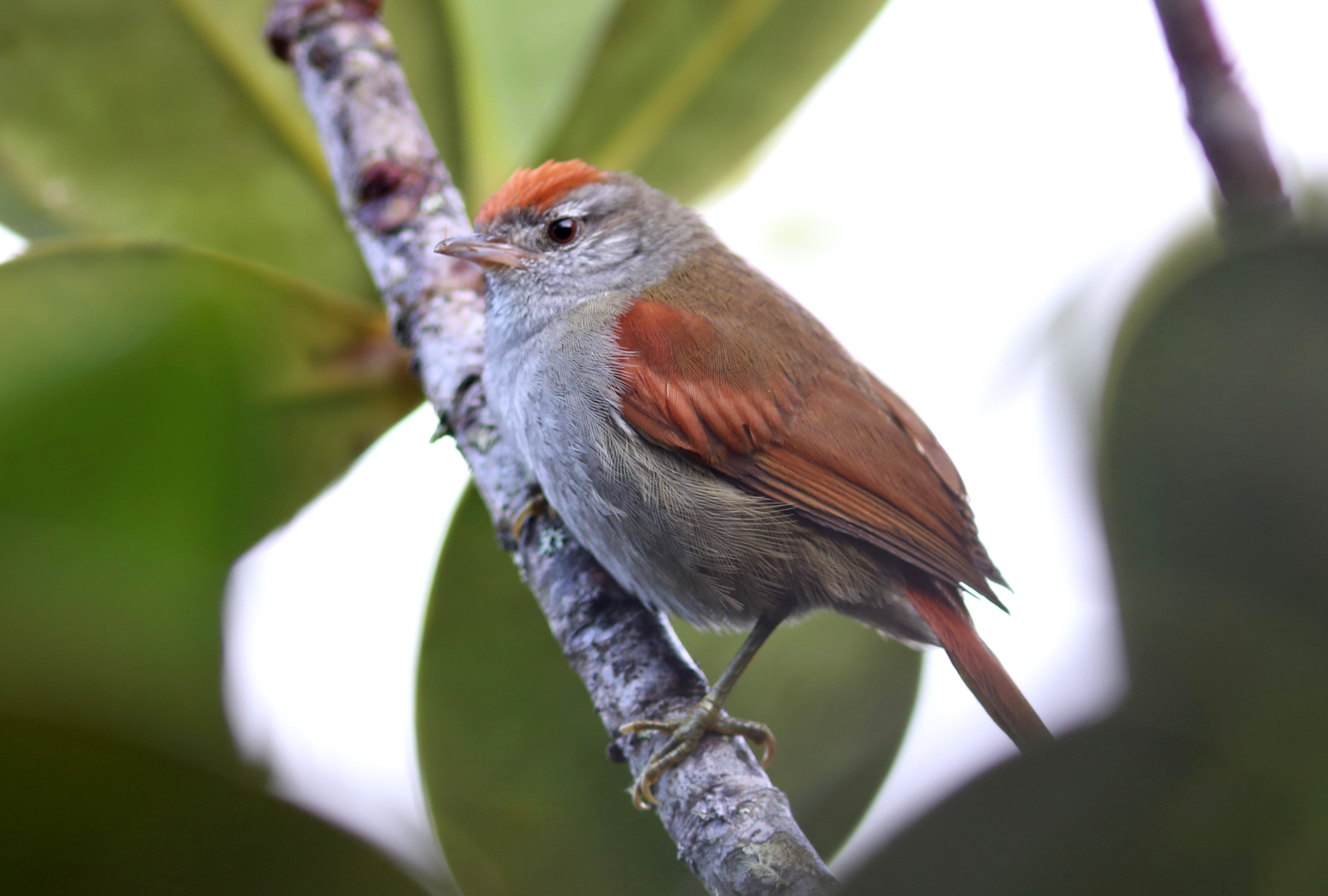
Tepui spinetail

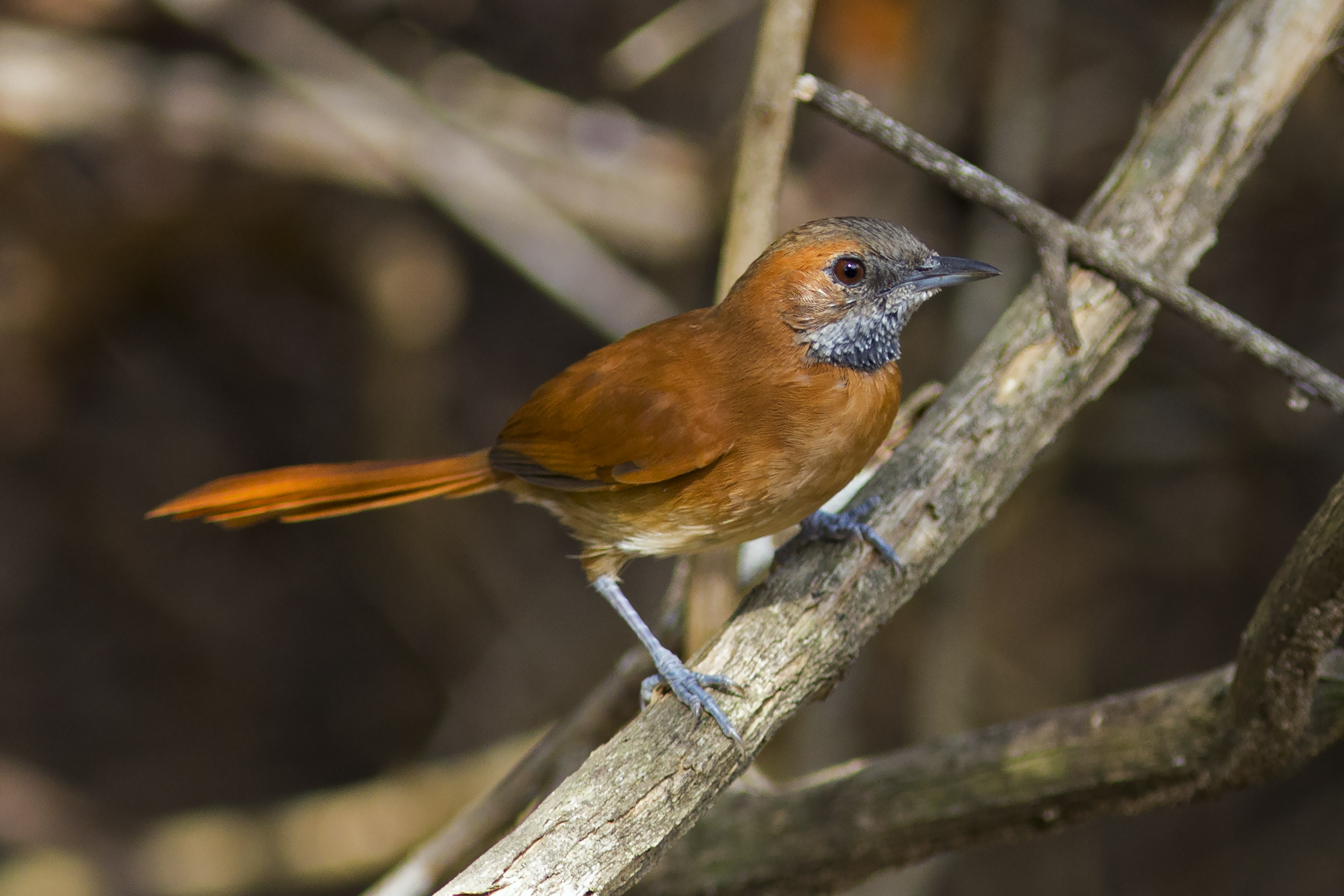
Hoary-throated spinetail
- South American leaftosser, Sclerurus obscurior
- Short-billed leaftosser, Sclerurus rufigularis (E-SA)
- Scaly-throated leaftosser, Sclerurus guatemalensis
- Black-tailed leaftosser, Sclerurus caudacutus (E-SA)
- Gray-throated leaftosser, Sclerurus albigularis
- Rufous-breasted leaftosser, Sclerurus scansor (E-SA)
- Coastal miner, Geositta peruviana (E-PE)
- Slender-billed miner, Geositta tenuirostris (E-SA)
- Common miner, Geositta cunicularia (E-SA)
- Puna miner, Geositta punensis (E-SA)
- Campo miner, Geositta poeciloptera (E-SA)
- Thick-billed miner, Geositta crassirostris (E-PE)
- Rufous-banded miner, Geositta rufipennis (E-SA)
- Grayish miner, Geositta maritima (E-SA)
- Short-billed miner, Geositta antarctica (E-SA)
- Dark-winged miner, Geositta saxicolina (E-PE)
- Creamy-rumped miner, Geositta isabellina (E-SA)
- Spot-throated woodcreeper, Certhiasomus stictolaemus (E-SA)
- Olivaceous woodcreeper, Sittasomus griseicapillus
- Piping long-tailed woodcreeper, Deconychura typica
- Whistling long-tailed woodcreeper, Deconychura longicauda (E-SA)
- Mournful long-tailed woodcreeper, Deconychura pallida (E-SA)
- Tyrannine woodcreeper, Dendrocincla tyrannina (E-SA)
- White-chinned woodcreeper, Dendrocincla merula (E-SA)
- Ruddy woodcreeper, Dendrocincla homochroa
- Plain-brown woodcreeper, Dendrocincla fuliginosa
- Plain-winged woodcreeper, Dendrocincla turdina (E-SA)
- Wedge-billed woodcreeper, Glyphorynchus spirurus
- Cinnamon-throated woodcreeper, Dendrexetastes rufigula (E-SA)
- Long-billed woodcreeper, Nasica longirostris (E-SA)
- Northern barred-woodcreeper, Dendrocolaptes sanctithomae
- Amazonian barred-woodcreeper, Dendrocolaptes certhia (E-SA)
- Black-banded woodcreeper, Dendrocolaptes picumnus
- Hoffmanns's woodcreeper, Dendrocolaptes hoffmannsi (E-BR)
- Planalto woodcreeper, Dendrocolaptes platyrostris (E-SA)
- Bar-bellied woodcreeper, Hylexetastes stresemanni (E-SA)
- Red-billed woodcreeper, Hylexetastes perrotii (E-SA)
- Uniform woodcreeper, Hylexetastes uniformis (E-SA)
- Strong-billed woodcreeper, Xiphocolaptes promeropirhynchus
- Moustached woodcreeper, Xiphocolaptes falcirostris (E-BR)
- White-throated woodcreeper, Xiphocolaptes albicollis (E-SA)
- Great rufous woodcreeper, Xiphocolaptes major (E-SA)
- Striped woodcreeper, Xiphorhynchus obsoletus (E-SA)
- Ceara woodcreeper, Xiphorhynchus atlanticus (E-BR)
- Lesser woodcreeper, Xiphorhynchus fuscus (E-SA)
- Chestnut-rumped woodcreeper, Xiphorhynchus pardalotus (E-SA)
- Ocellated woodcreeper, Xiphorhynchus ocellatus (E-SA)
- Elegant woodcreeper, Xiphorhynchus elegans (E-SA)
- Spix's woodcreeper, Xiphorhynchus spixii (E-BR)
- Cocoa woodcreeper, Xiphorhynchus susurrans
- Buff-throated woodcreeper, Xiphorhynchus guttatus (E-SA)
- Black-striped woodcreeper, Xiphorhynchus lachrymosus
- Spotted woodcreeper, Xiphorhynchus erythropygius
- Olive-backed woodcreeper, Xiphorhynchus triangularis (E-SA)
- Straight-billed woodcreeper, Dendroplex picus
- Zimmer's woodcreeper, Dendroplex kienerii (E-SA)
- Red-billed scythebill, Campylorhamphus trochilirostris
- Black-billed scythebill, Campylorhamphus falcularius (E-SA)
- Curve-billed scythebill, Campylorhamphus procurvoides (E-SA)
- Brown-billed scythebill, Campylorhamphus pusillus
- Greater scythebill, Drymotoxeres pucheranii (E-SA)
- Scimitar-billed woodcreeper, Drymornis bridgesii (E-SA)
- Streak-headed woodcreeper, Lepidocolaptes souleyetii
- Narrow-billed woodcreeper, Lepidocolaptes angustirostris (E-SA)
- Montane woodcreeper, Lepidocolaptes lacrymiger (E-SA)
- Scaled woodcreeper, Lepidocolaptes squamatus (E-BR)
- Scalloped woodcreeper, Lepidocolaptes falcinellus (E-SA)
- Duida woodcreeper, Lepidocolaptes duidae (E-SA)
- Guianan woodcreeper, Lepidocolaptes albolineatus (E-SA)
- Inambari woodcreeper, Lepidocolaptes fatimalimae (E-SA)
- Dusky-capped woodcreeper, Lepidocolaptes fuscicapillus (E-SA)
- Slender-billed xenops, Xenops tenuirostris (E-SA)
- Northern plain-xenops, Xenops mexicanus
- Amazonian plain-xenops, Xenops genibarbis (E-SA)
- Atlantic plain-xenops, Xenops minutus (E-SA)
- Streaked xenops, Xenops rutilans
- Point-tailed palmcreeper, Berlepschia rikeri (E-SA)
- Rufous-tailed xenops, Microxenops milleri (E-SA)
- White-throated treerunner, Pygarrhichas albogularis (E-SA)
- Rock earthcreeper, Ochetorhynchus andaecola (E-SA)
- Straight-billed earthcreeper, Ochetorhynchus ruficaudus (E-SA)
- Band-tailed earthcreeper, Ochetorhynchus phoenicurus (E-SA)
- Crag chilia, Ochetorhynchus melanurus (E-CH)
- Pacific tuftedcheek, Pseudocolaptes johnsoni (E-SA)
- Streaked tuftedcheek, Pseudocolaptes boissonneautii (E-SA)
- Rusty-winged barbtail, Premnornis guttuliger (E-SA)
- Bolivian earthcreeper, Tarphonomus harterti (E-SA)
- Chaco earthcreeper, Tarphonomus certhioides (E-SA)
- Wing-banded hornero, Furnarius figulus (E-BR)
- Pale-legged hornero, Furnarius leucopus (E-SA)
- Pale-billed hornero, Furnarius torridus (E-SA)
- Lesser hornero, Furnarius minor (E-SA)
- Rufous hornero, Furnarius rufus (E-SA)
- Crested hornero, Furnarius cristatus (E-SA)
- Sharp-tailed streamcreeper, Lochmias nematura
- Wren-like rushbird, Phleocryptes melanops (E-SA)
- Curve-billed reedhaunter, Limnornis curvirostris (E-SA)
- Striated earthcreeper, Geocerthia serrana (E-PE)
- Patagonian forest earthcreeper, Upucerthia saturatior (E-SA)
- Scale-throated earthcreeper, Upucerthia dumetaria (E-SA)
- White-throated earthcreeper, Upucerthia albigula (E-SA)
- Buff-breasted earthcreeper, Upucerthia validirostris (E-SA)
- Long-tailed cinclodes, Cinclodes pabsti (E-BR)
- Buff-winged cinclodes, Cinclodes fuscus (E-SA)
- Blackish cinclodes, Cinclodes antarcticus (E-SA)
- Cordoba cinclodes, Cinclodes comechingonus (E-AR)
- Chestnut-winged cinclodes, Cinclodes albidiventris (E-SA)
- Olrog's cinclodes, Cinclodes olrogi (E-AR)
- Cream-winged cinclodes, Cinclodes albiventris (E-SA)
- Gray-flanked cinclodes, Cinclodes oustaleti (E-SA)
- Stout-billed cinclodes, Cinclodes excelsior (E-SA)
- Royal cinclodes, Cinclodes aricomae (E-SA)
- White-bellied cinclodes, Cinclodes palliatus (E-PE)
- White-winged cinclodes, Cinclodes atacamensis (E-SA)
- Dark-bellied cinclodes, Cinclodes patagonicus (E-SA)
- Surf cinclodes, Cinclodes taczanowskii (E-PE)
- Seaside cinclodes, Cinclodes nigrofumosus (E-CH)
- Dusky-cheeked foliage-gleaner, Anabazenops dorsalis (E-SA)
- White-collared foliage-gleaner, Anabazenops fuscus (E-BR)
- Slaty-winged foliage-gleaner, Neophilydor fuscipenne
- Rufous-rumped foliage-gleaner, Neophilydor erythrocercum (E-SA)
- Great xenops, Megaxenops parnaguae (E-BR)
- Pale-browed treehunter, Cichlocolaptes leucophrus (E-BR)
- Sharp-billed treehunter, Heliobletus contaminatus (E-SA)
- Alagoas foliage-gleaner, Philydor novaesi (E-BR)
- Black-capped foliage-gleaner, Philydor atricapillus (E-SA)
- Cinnamon-rumped foliage-gleaner, Philydor pyrrhodes (E-SA)
- Montane foliage-gleaner, Anabacerthia striaticollis (E-SA)
- Scaly-throated foliage-gleaner, Anabacerthia variegaticeps
- Rufous-tailed foliage-gleaner, Anabacerthia ruficaudata (E-SA)
- White-browed foliage-gleaner, Anabacerthia amaurotis (E-SA)
- Ochre-breasted foliage-gleaner, Anabacerthia lichtensteini (E-SA)
- Buff-browed foliage-gleaner, Syndactyla rufosuperciliata (E-SA)
- Russet-mantled foliage-gleaner, Syndactyla dimidiata (E-SA)
- White-throated foliage-gleaner, Syndactyla roraimae (E-SA)
- Lineated foliage-gleaner, Syndactyla subalaris
- Rufous-necked foliage-gleaner, Syndactyla ruficollis (E-SA)
- Guttulate foliage-gleaner, Syndactyla guttulata (E-VE)
- Peruvian recurvebill, Syndactyla ucayalae (E-SA)
- Bolivian recurvebill, Syndactyla striata (E-SA)
- Chestnut-winged hookbill, Ancistrops strigilatus (E-SA)
- Buff-fronted foliage-gleaner, Dendroma rufa
- Chestnut-winged foliage-gleaner, Dendroma erythroptera (E-SA)
- Chestnut-capped foliage-gleaner, Clibanornis rectirostris (E-SA)
- Canebrake groundcreeper, Clibanornis dendrocolaptoides (E-SA)
- Henna-hooded foliage-gleaner, Clibanornis erythrocephalus (E-SA)
- Ruddy foliage-gleaner, Clibanornis rubiginosus
- Santa Marta foliage-gleaner, Clibanornis rufipectus (E-CO)
- Uniform treehunter, Thripadectes ignobilis (E-SA)
- Flammulated treehunter, Thripadectes flammulatus (E-SA)
- Rufous-backed treehunter, Thripadectes scrutator (E-SA)
- Striped treehunter, Thripadectes holostictus (E-SA)
- Streak-capped treehunter, Thripadectes virgaticeps (E-SA)
- Black-billed treehunter, Thripadectes melanorhynchus (E-SA)
- Chestnut-crowned foliage-gleaner, Automolus rufipileatus (E-SA)
- Brown-rumped foliage-gleaner, Automolus melanopezus (E-SA)
- Buff-throated foliage-gleaner, Automolus ochrolaemus
- Striped woodhaunter, Automolus subulatus
- Olive-backed foliage-gleaner, Automolus infuscatus (E-SA)
- Para foliage-gleaner, Automolus paraensis (E-BR)
- Pernambuco foliage-gleaner, Automolus lammi (E-BR)
- White-eyed foliage-gleaner, Automolus leucophthalmus (E-SA)
- Spotted barbtail, Premnoplex brunnescens
- White-throated barbtail, Premnoplex tatei (E-VE)
- Fulvous-dotted treerunner, Margarornis stellatus (E-SA)
- Pearled treerunner, Margarornis squamiger (E-SA)
- Thorn-tailed rayadito, Aphrastura spinicauda (E-SA)
- Masafuera rayadito, Aphrastura masafuerae (E-CH)
- Des Murs's wiretail, Sylviorthorhynchus desmursii (E-SA)
- Tawny tit-spinetail, Sylviorthorhynchus yanacensis (E-SA)
- Brown-capped tit-spinetail, Leptasthenura fuliginiceps (E-SA)
- Tufted tit-spinetail, Leptasthenura platensis (E-SA)
- Plain-mantled tit-spinetail, Leptasthenura aegithaloides (E-SA)
- Striolated tit-spinetail, Leptasthenura striolata (E-BR)
- Rusty-crowned tit-spinetail, Leptasthenura pileata (E-PE)
- White-browed tit-spinetail, Leptasthenura xenothorax (E-PE)
- Streaked tit-spinetail, Leptasthenura striata (E-SA)
- Andean tit-spinetail, Leptasthenura andicola (E-SA)
- Araucaria tit-spinetail, Leptasthenura setaria (E-SA)
- Rufous-fronted thornbird, Phacellodomus rufifrons (E-SA)
- Streak-fronted thornbird, Phacellodomus striaticeps (E-SA)
- Little thornbird, Phacellodomus sibilatrix (E-SA)
- Chestnut-backed thornbird, Phacellodomus dorsalis (E-PE)
- Spot-breasted thornbird, Phacellodomus maculipectus (E-SA)
- Freckle-breasted thornbird, Phacellodomus striaticollis (E-SA)
- Greater thornbird, Phacellodomus ruber (E-SA)
- Orange-eyed thornbird, Phacellodomus erythrophthalmus (E-BR)
- Orange-breasted thornbird, Phacellodomus ferrugineigula (E-SA)
- White-browed spinetail, Hellmayrea gularis (E-SA)
- Firewood-gatherer, Anumbius annumbi (E-SA)
- Lark-like brushrunner, Coryphistera alaudina (E-SA)
- Creamy-breasted canastero, Asthenes dorbignyi (E-SA)
- Berlepsch's canastero, Asthenes berlepschi (E-BO)
- Short-billed canastero, Asthenes baeri (E-SA)
- Cipo canastero, Asthenes luizae (E-BR)
- Hudson's canastero, Asthenes hudsoni (E-SA)
- Austral canastero, Asthenes anthoides (E-SA)
- Line-fronted canastero, Asthenes urubambensis (E-SA)
- Many-striped canastero, Asthenes flammulata (E-SA)
- Junin canastero, Asthenes virgata (E-PE)
- Scribble-tailed canastero, Asthenes maculicauda (E-SA)
- Streak-backed canastero, Asthenes wyatti (E-SA)
- Puna canastero, Asthenes sclateri (E-SA)
- Streak-throated canastero, Asthenes humilis (E-SA)
- Cordilleran canastero, Asthenes modesta (E-SA)
- Itatiaia spinetail, Asthenes moreirae (E-BR)
- Sharp-billed canastero, Asthenes pyrrholeuca (E-SA)
- Black-throated thistletail, Asthenes harterti (E-BO)
- Puna thistletail, Asthenes helleri (E-SA)
- Ayacucho thistletail, Asthenes ayacuchensis (E-PE)
- Vilcabamba thistletail, Asthenes vilcabambae (E-PE)
- Canyon canastero, Asthenes pudibunda (E-SA)
- Rusty-fronted canastero, Asthenes ottonis (E-PE)
- Maquis canastero, Asthenes heterura (E-SA)
- Eye-ringed thistletail, Asthenes palpebralis (E-PE)
- Ochre-browed thistletail, Asthenes coryi (E-VE)
- Perija thistletail, Asthenes perijana (E-SA)
- White-chinned thistletail, Asthenes fuliginosa (E-SA)
- Mouse-colored thistletail, Asthenes griseomurina (E-SA)
- Pink-legged graveteiro, Acrobatornis fonsecai (E-BR)
- Orange-fronted plushcrown, Metopothrix aurantiaca (E-SA)
- Double-banded graytail, Xenerpestes minlosi
- Equatorial graytail, Xenerpestes singularis (E-SA)
- Spectacled prickletail, Siptornis striaticollis (E-SA)
- Roraiman barbtail, Roraimia adusta (E-SA)
- Striated softtail, Thripophaga macroura (E-BR)
- Orinoco softtail, Thripophaga cherriei (E-SA)
- Delta Amacuro softtail, Thripophaga amacurensis (E-VE)
- Plain softtail, Thripophaga fusciceps (E-SA)
- Russet-mantled softtail, Thripophaga berlepschi (E-PE)
- Straight-billed reedhaunter, Limnoctites rectirostris (E-SA)
- Sulphur-bearded reedhaunter, Limnoctites sulphuriferus (E-SA)
- Marcapata spinetail, Cranioleuca marcapatae (E-PE)
- Vilcabamba spinetail, Cranioleuca weskei (E-PE)
- Light-crowned spinetail, Cranioleuca albiceps (E-SA)
- Rusty-backed spinetail, Cranioleuca vulpina (E-SA)
- Parker's spinetail, Cranioleuca vulpecula (E-SA)
- Crested spinetail, Cranioleuca subcristata (E-SA)
- Stripe-crowned spinetail, Cranioleuca pyrrhophia (E-SA)
- Bolivian spinetail, Cranioleuca henricae (E-BO)
- Olive spinetail, Cranioleuca obsoleta (E-SA)
- Pallid spinetail, Cranioleuca pallida (E-BR)
- Gray-headed spinetail, Cranioleuca semicinerea (E-BR)
- Creamy-crested spinetail, Cranioleuca albicapilla (E-PE)
- Red-faced spinetail, Cranioleuca erythrops
- Tepui spinetail, Cranioleuca demissa (E-SA)
- Streak-capped spinetail, Cranioleuca hellmayri (E-SA)
- Ash-browed spinetail, Cranioleuca curtata (E-SA)
- Line-cheeked spinetail, Cranioleuca antisiensis (E-SA)
- Speckled spinetail, Cranioleuca gutturata (E-SA)
- Scaled spinetail, Cranioleuca muelleri (E-BR)
- Dusky-tailed canastero, Pseudasthenes humicola (E-CH)
- Patagonian canastero, Pseudasthenes patagonica (E-AR)
- Steinbach's canastero, Pseudasthenes steinbachi (E-AR)
- Cactus canastero, Pseudasthenes cactorum (E-PE)
- Bay-capped wren-spinetail, Spartonoica maluroides (E-SA)
- Caatinga cacholote, Pseudoseisura cristata (E-BR)
- Rufous cacholote, Pseudoseisura unirufa (E-SA)
- Brown cacholote, Pseudoseisura lophotes (E-SA)
- White-throated cacholote, Pseudoseisura gutturalis (E-AR)
- Yellow-chinned spinetail, Certhiaxis cinnamomeus (E-SA)
- Red-and-white spinetail, Certhiaxis mustelinus (E-SA)
- White-bellied spinetail, Mazaria propinqua (E-SA)
- Chotoy spinetail, Schoeniophylax phryganophilus (E-SA)
- Ochre-cheeked spinetail, Synallaxis scutata (E-SA)
- Gray-bellied spinetail, Synallaxis cinerascens (E-SA)
- Plain-crowned spinetail, Synallaxis gujanensis (E-SA)
- White-lored spinetail, Synallaxis albilora (E-SA)
- Marañon spinetail, Synallaxis maranonica (E-SA)
- Great spinetail, Synallaxis hypochondriaca (E-PE)
- Necklaced spinetail, Synallaxis stictothorax (E-SA)
- Chinchipe spinetail, Synallaxis chinchipensis (E-PE)
- Russet-bellied spinetail, Synallaxis zimmeri (E-PE)
- Slaty spinetail, Synallaxis brachyura
- Silvery-throated spinetail, Synallaxis subpudica (E-CO)
- Red-shouldered spinetail, Synallaxis hellmayri (E-BR)
- Rufous-capped spinetail, Synallaxis ruficapilla (E-SA)
- Bahia spinetail, Synallaxis cinerea (E-BR)
- Pinto's spinetail, Synallaxis infuscata (E-BR)
- Dusky spinetail, Synallaxis moesta (E-SA)
- McConnell's spinetail, Synallaxis macconnelli (E-SA)
- Cabanis's spinetail, Synallaxis cabanisi (E-SA)
- Cinereous-breasted spinetail, Synallaxis hypospodia (E-SA)
- Spix's spinetail, Synallaxis spixi (E-SA)
- Dark-breasted spinetail, Synallaxis albigularis (E-SA)
- Rio Orinoco spinetail, Synallaxis beverlyae (E-VE)
- Pale-breasted spinetail, Synallaxis albescens
- Sooty-fronted spinetail, Synallaxis frontalis (E-SA)
- Azara's spinetail, Synallaxis azarae (E-SA)
- Apurimac spinetail, Synallaxis courseni (E-PE)
- White-whiskered spinetail, Synallaxis candei (E-SA)
- Hoary-throated spinetail, Synallaxis kollari (E-SA)
- Blackish-headed spinetail, Synallaxis tithys (E-SA)
- Rusty-headed spinetail, Synallaxis fuscorufa (E-CO)
- Rufous spinetail, Synallaxis unirufa (E-SA)
- Black-throated spinetail, Synallaxis castanea (E-VE)
- Stripe-breasted spinetail, Synallaxis cinnamomea (E-SA)
- Ruddy spinetail, Synallaxis rutilans (E-SA)
- Chestnut-throated spinetail, Synallaxis cherriei (E-SA)

== Manakins ==
Order: Passeriformes Family: Pipridae

The manakins are a family of subtropical and tropical mainland Central and South America, and Trinidad and Tobago. They are compact forest birds, the males typically being brightly colored, although the females of most species are duller and usually green-plumaged. Manakins feed on small fruits, berries and insects.

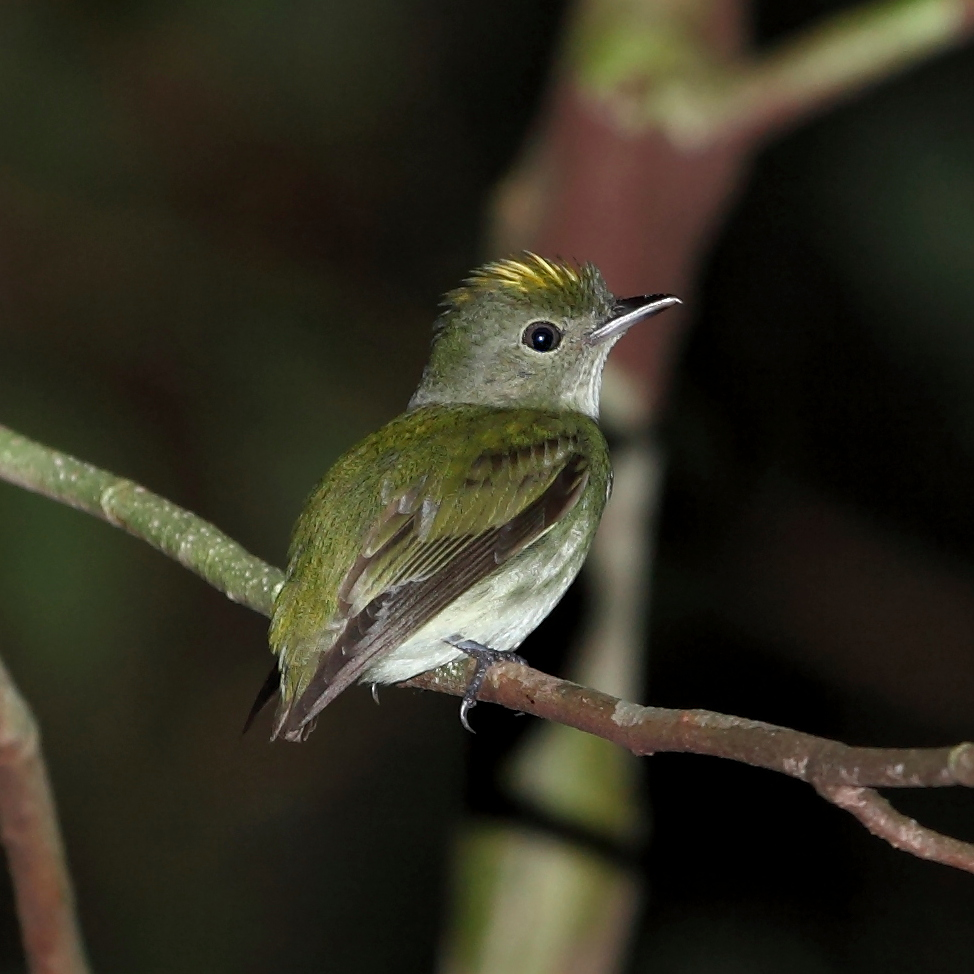
Tiny tyrant-manakin

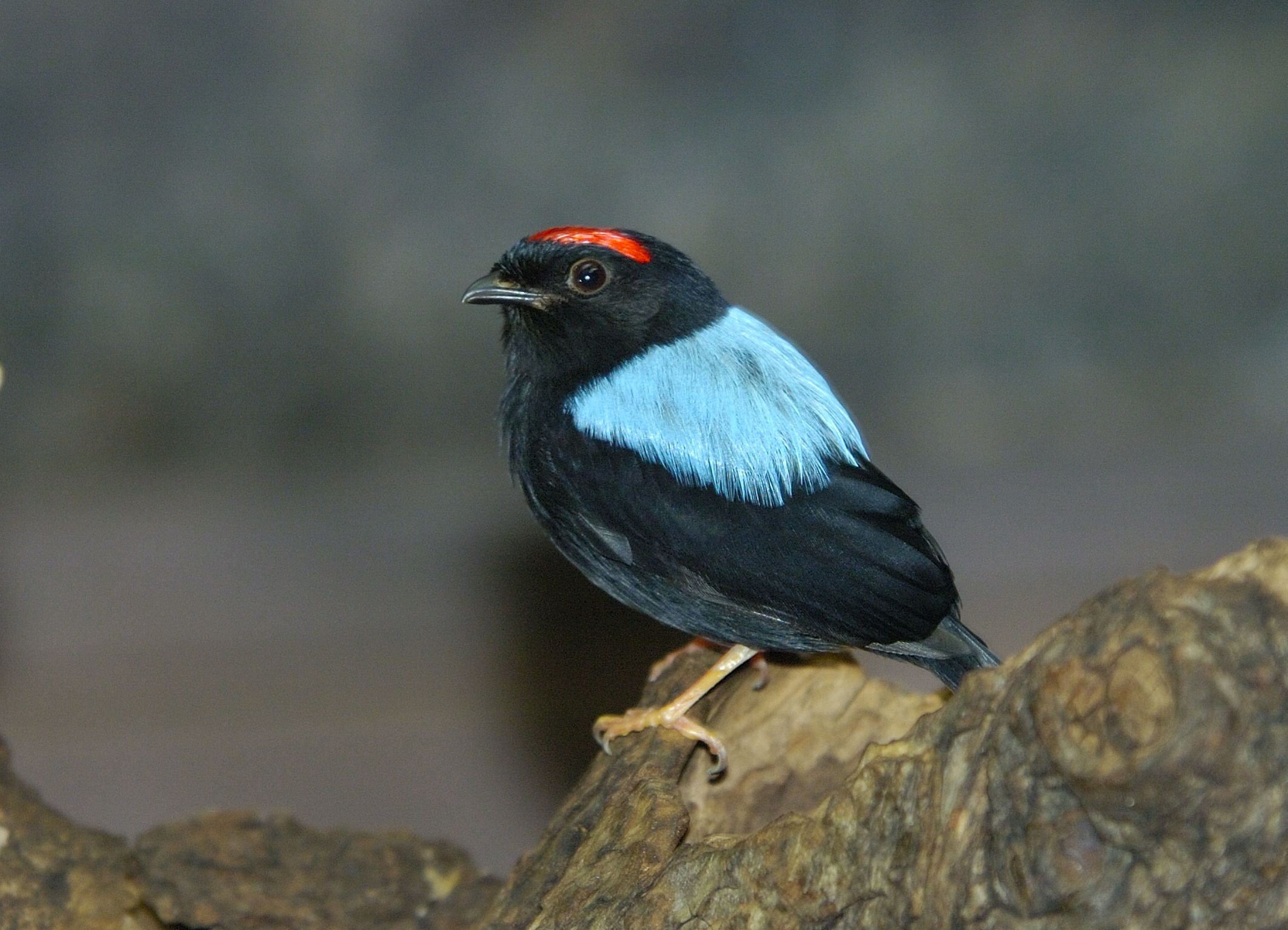
Blue-backed manakin

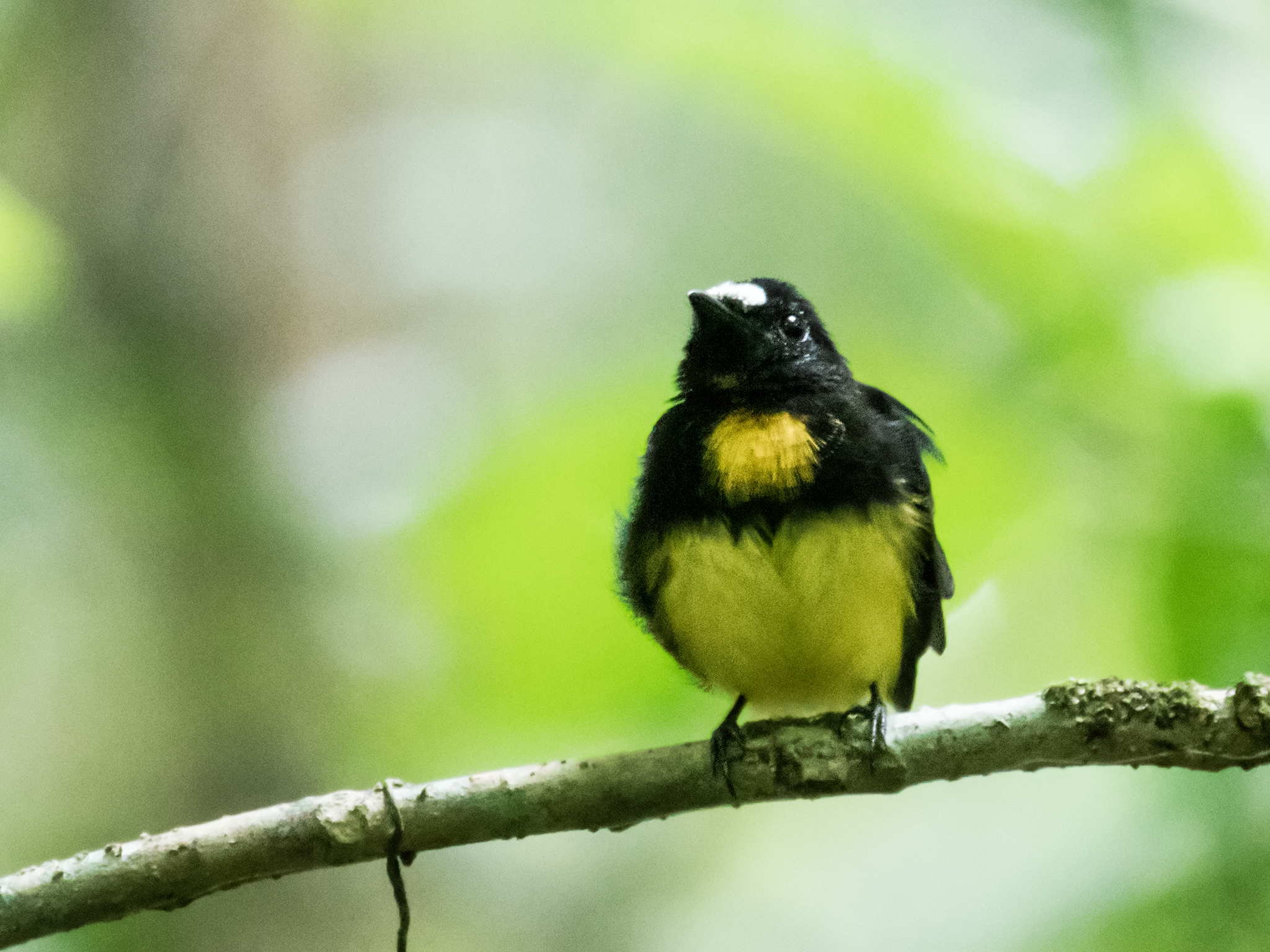
White-fronted manakin

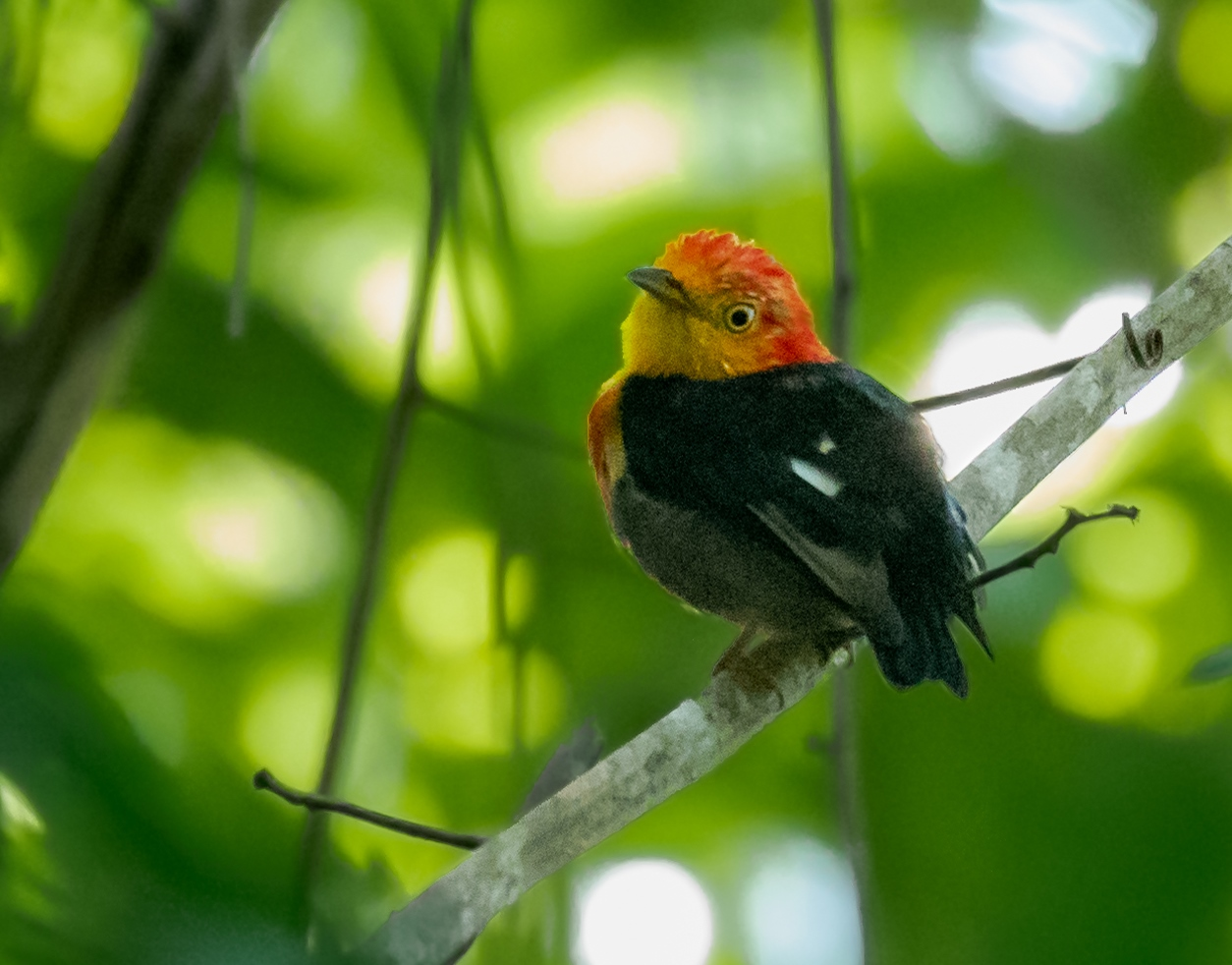
Crimson-hooded manakin

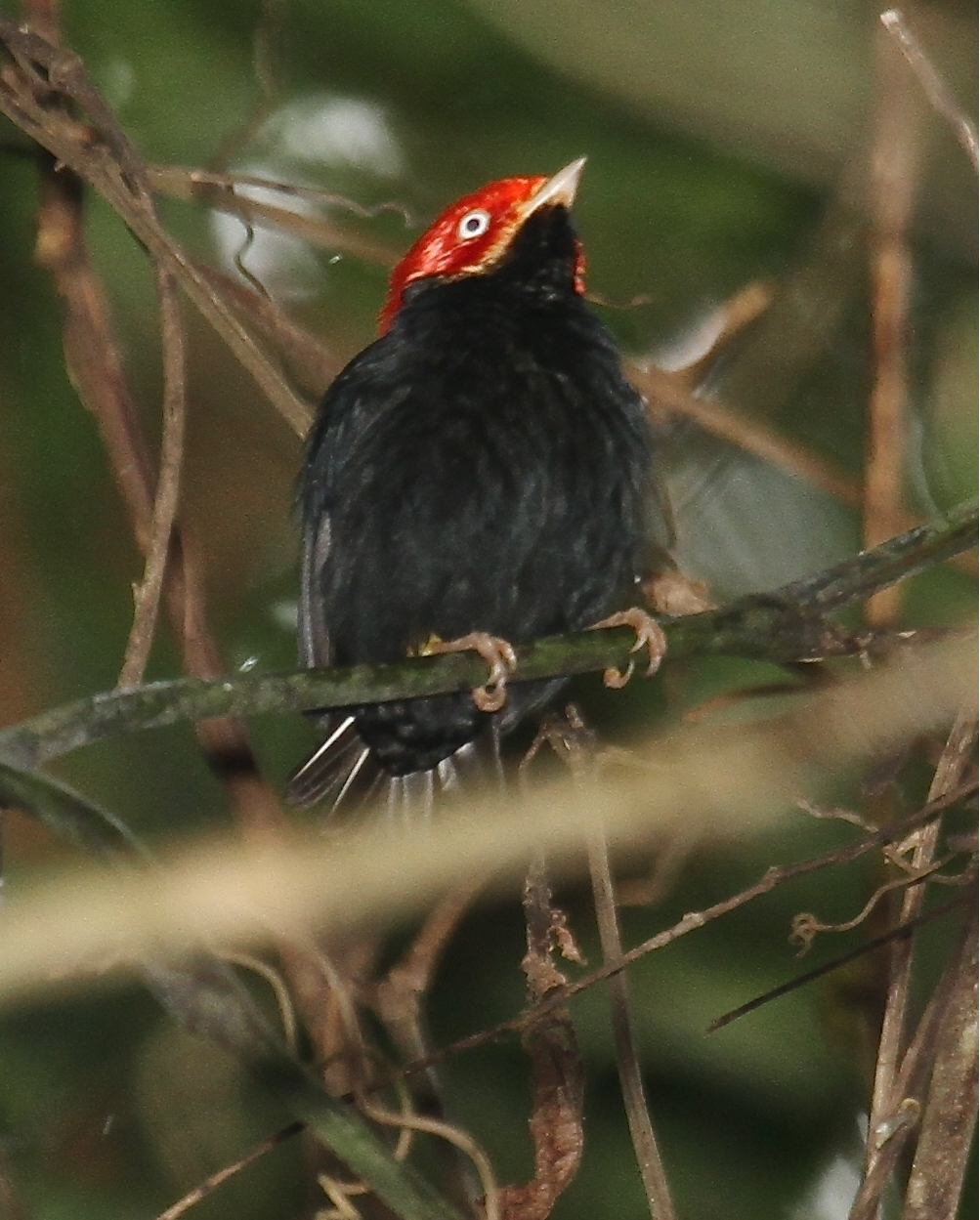
Round-tailed manakin
- Serra do Mar tyrant-manakin, Protopelma chrysolophum (E-BR)
- Dwarf tyrant-manakin, Tyranneutes stolzmanni (E-SA)
- Tiny tyrant-manakin, Tyranneutes virescens (E-SA)
- Pale-bellied tyrant-manakin, Neopelma pallescens (E-SA)
- Saffron-crested tyrant-manakin, Neopelma chrysocephalum (E-SA)
- Wied's tyrant-manakin, Neopelma aurifrons (E-BR)
- Sulphur-bellied tyrant-manakin, Neopelma sulphureiventer (E-SA)
- Yellow-headed manakin, Chloropipo flavicapilla (E-SA)
- Jet manakin, Chloropipo unicolor (E-SA)
- Lance-tailed manakin, Chiroxiphia lanceolata
- Blue-backed manakin, Chiroxiphia pareola (E-SA)
- Yungas manakin, Chiroxiphia boliviana (E-SA)
- Swallow-tailed manakin, Chiroxiphia caudata (E-SA)
- Araripe manakin, Chiroxiphia bokermanni (E-BR)
- Helmeted manakin, Chiroxiphia galeata (E-SA)
- Pin-tailed manakin, Ilicura militaris (E-BR)
- Golden-winged manakin, Masius chrysopterus (E-SA)
- White-ruffed manakin, Corapipo altera
- White-bibbed manakin, Corapipo leucorrhoa (E-SA)
- White-throated manakin, Corapipo gutturalis (E-SA)
- Olive manakin, Xenopipo uniformis (E-SA)
- Black manakin, Xenopipo atronitens (E-SA)
- Green manakin, Cryptopipo holochlora
- Velvety manakin, Lepidothrix velutina
- Blue-capped manakin, Lepidothrix coronata
- Snow-capped manakin, Lepidothrix nattereri (E-SA)
- Golden-crowned manakin, Lepidothrix vilasboasi (E-BR)
- Opal-crowned manakin, Lepidothrix iris (E-BR)
- Orange-bellied manakin, Lepidothrix suavissima (E-SA)
- White-fronted manakin, Lepidothrix serena (E-SA)
- Blue-rumped manakin, Lepidothrix isidorei (E-SA)
- Cerulean-capped manakin, Lepidothrix coeruleocapilla (E-PE)
- Orange-crowned manakin, Heterocercus aurantiivertex (E-SA)
- Yellow-crowned manakin, Heterocercus flavivertex (E-SA)
- Flame-crowned manakin, Heterocercus linteatus (E-SA)
- White-bearded manakin, Manacus manacus (E-SA)
- Crimson-hooded manakin, Pipra aureola (E-SA)
- Wire-tailed manakin, Pipra filicauda (E-SA)
- Band-tailed manakin, Pipra fasciicauda (E-SA)
- Club-winged manakin, Machaeropterus deliciosus (E-SA)
- Striolated manakin, Machaeropterus striolatus (E-SA)
- Painted manakin, Machaeropterus eckelberryi (E-PE)
- Kinglet manakin, Machaeropterus regulus (E-BR)
- Fiery-capped manakin, Machaeropterus pyrocephalus (E-SA)
- White-crowned manakin, Pseudopipra pipra
- Scarlet-horned manakin, Ceratopipra cornuta (E-SA)
- Red-capped manakin, Ceratopipra mentalis
- Golden-headed manakin, Ceratopipra erythrocephala
- Red-headed manakin, Ceratopipra rubrocapilla (E-SA)
- Round-tailed manakin, Ceratopipra chloromeros (E-SA)

== Cotingas ==
Order: Passeriformes Family: Cotingidae

Cotingas are birds of forests or forest edges in tropical South America. Comparatively little is known about this diverse group, although all have broad bills with hooked tips, rounded wings, and strong legs. The males of many of the species are brightly colored or decorated with plumes or wattles.

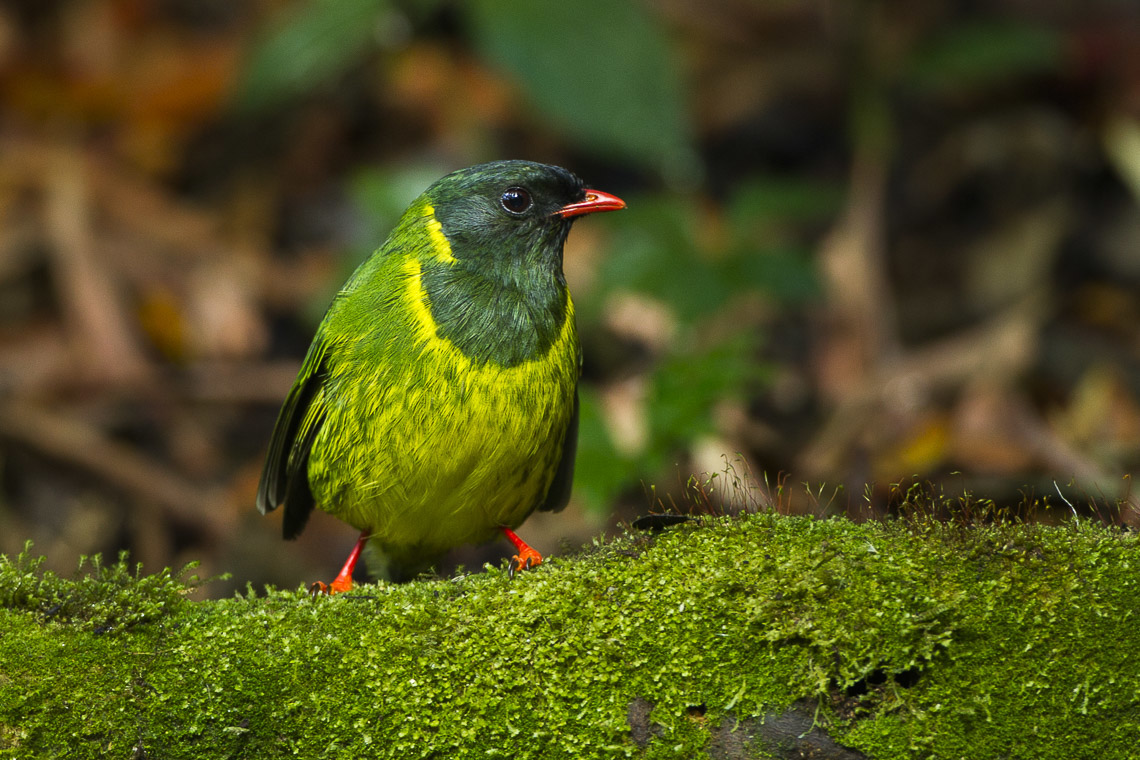
Green-and-black fruiteater

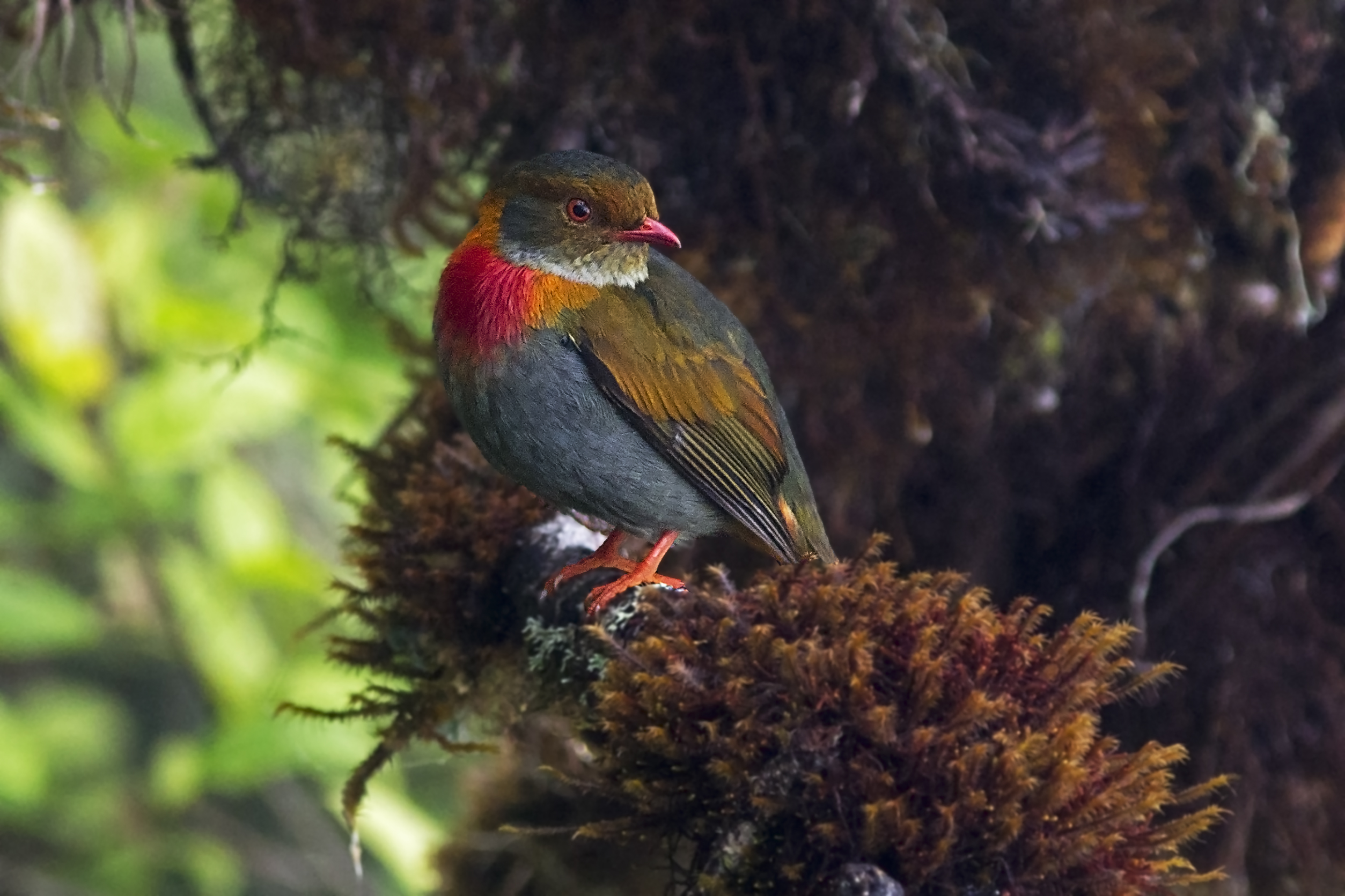
Red-banded fruiteater

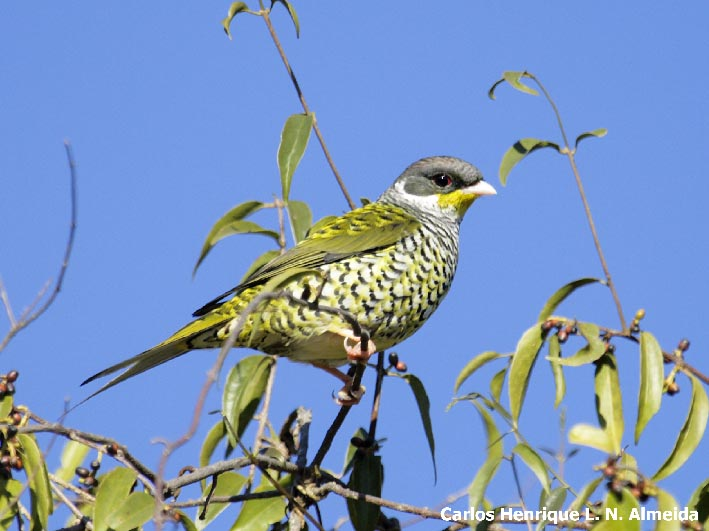
Swallow-tailed cotinga

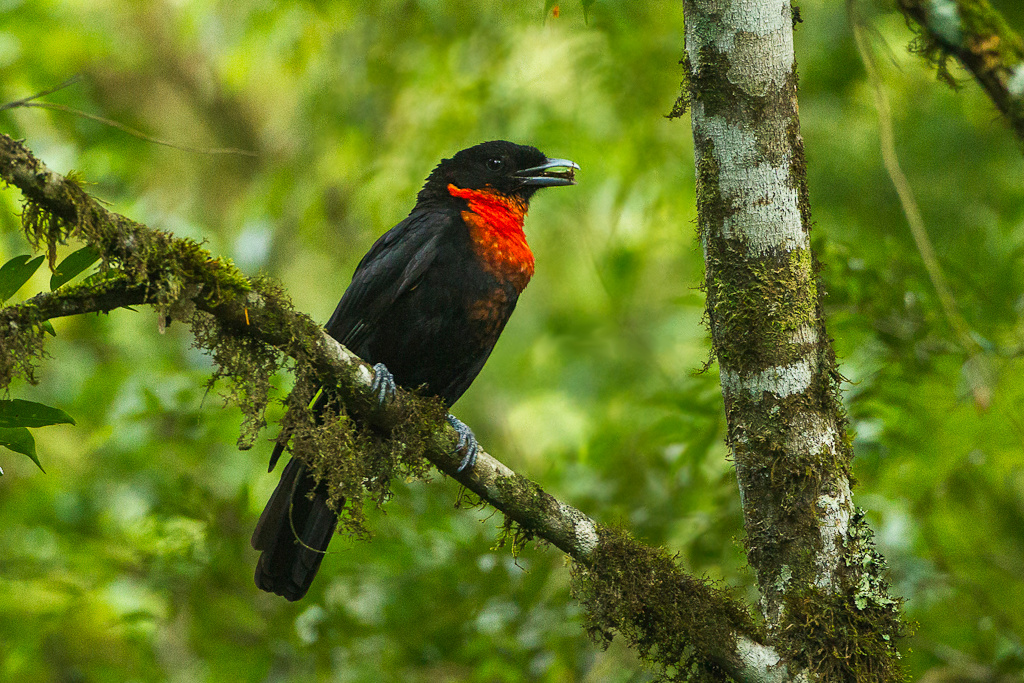
Red-ruffed fruitcrow

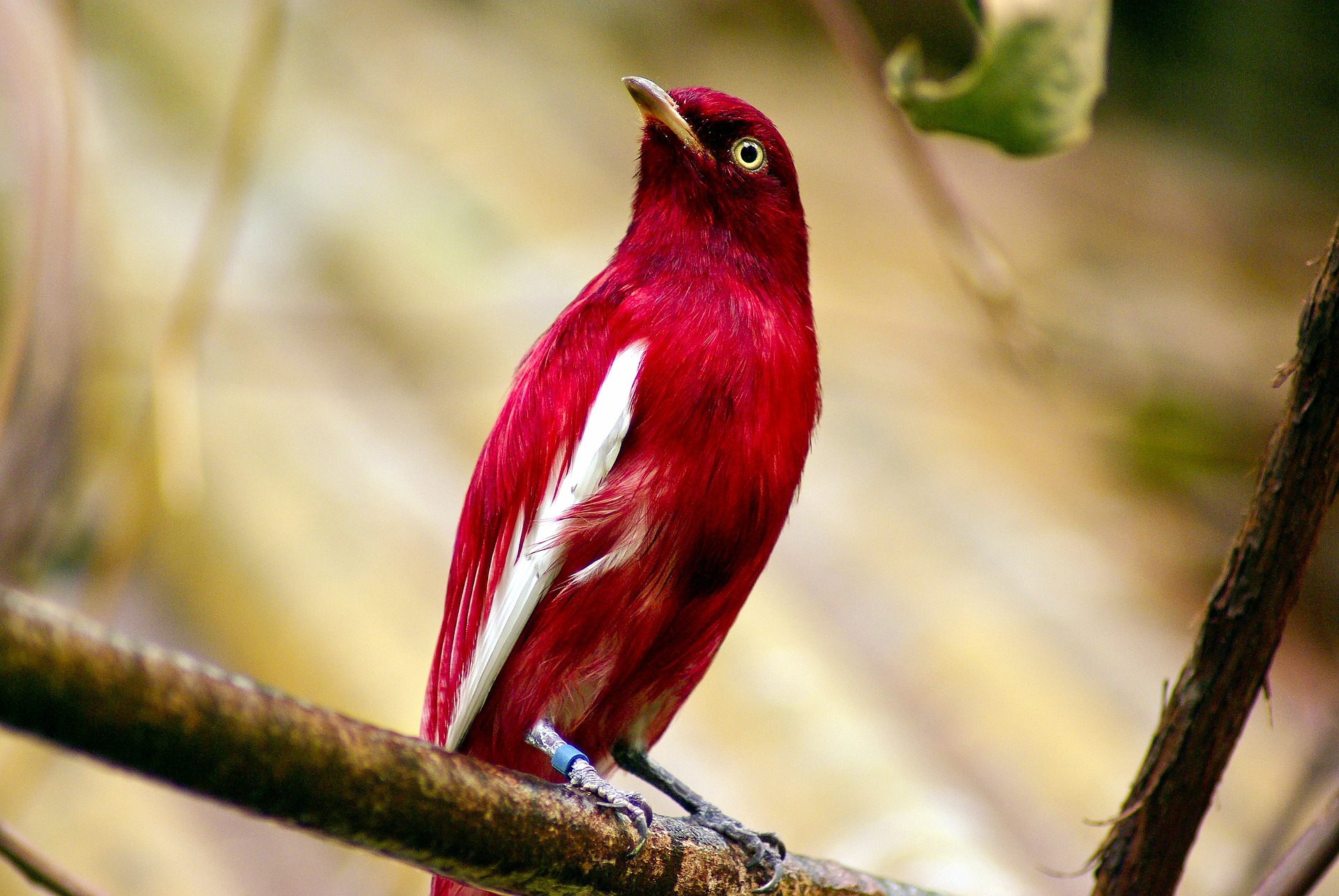
Pompadour cotinga
- Hooded berryeater, Carpornis cucullata (E-BR)
- Black-headed berryeater, Carpornis melanocephala (E-BR)
- Green-and-black fruiteater, Pipreola riefferii (E-SA)
- Band-tailed fruiteater, Pipreola intermedia (E-SA)
- Barred fruiteater, Pipreola arcuata (E-SA)
- Golden-breasted fruiteater, Pipreola aureopectus (E-SA)
- Orange-breasted fruiteater, Pipreola jucunda (E-SA)
- Black-chested fruiteater, Pipreola lubomirskii (E-SA)
- Masked fruiteater, Pipreola pulchra (E-PE)
- Scarlet-breasted fruiteater, Pipreola frontalis (E-SA)
- Fiery-throated fruiteater, Pipreola chlorolepidota (E-SA)
- Handsome fruiteater, Pipreola formosa (E-VE)
- Red-banded fruiteater, Pipreola whitelyi (E-SA)
- Scaled fruiteater, Ampelioides tschudii (E-SA)
- White-cheeked cotinga, Zaratornis stresemanni (E-PE)
- Peruvian plantcutter, Phytotoma raimondii (E-PE)
- White-tipped plantcutter, Phytotoma rutila (E-SA)
- Rufous-tailed plantcutter, Phytotoma rara (E-SA)
- Swallow-tailed cotinga, Phibalura flavirostris (E-SA)
- Chestnut-bellied cotinga, Doliornis remseni (E-SA)
- Bay-vented cotinga, Doliornis sclateri (E-PE)
- Red-crested cotinga, Ampelion rubrocristatus (E-SA)
- Chestnut-crested cotinga, Ampelion rufaxilla (E-SA)
- Guianan red-cotinga, Phoenicircus carnifex (E-SA)
- Black-necked red-cotinga, Phoenicircus nigricollis (E-SA)
- Guianan cock-of-the-rock, Rupicola rupicola (E-SA)
- Andean cock-of-the-rock, Rupicola peruvianus (E-SA)
- Gray-tailed piha, Snowornis subalaris (E-SA)
- Olivaceous piha, Snowornis cryptolophus (E-SA)
- Crimson fruitcrow, Haematoderus militaris (E-SA)
- Purple-throated fruitcrow, Querula purpurata
- Red-ruffed fruitcrow, Pyroderus scutatus (E-SA)
- Amazonian umbrellabird, Cephalopterus ornatus (E-SA)
- Long-wattled umbrellabird, Cephalopterus penduliger (E-SA)
- Capuchinbird, Perissocephalus tricolor (E-SA)
- Blue cotinga, Cotinga nattererii
- Plum-throated cotinga, Cotinga maynana (E-SA)
- Purple-breasted cotinga, Cotinga cotinga (E-SA)
- Banded cotinga, Cotinga maculata (E-BR)
- Spangled cotinga, Cotinga cayana (E-SA)
- Rufous piha, Lipaugus unirufus
- Rose-collared piha, Lipaugus streptophorus (E-SA)
- Screaming piha, Lipaugus vociferans (E-SA)
- Cinnamon-vented piha, Lipaugus lanioides (E-BR)
- Black-and-gold cotinga, Lipaugus ater (E-BR)
- Gray-winged cotinga, Lipaugus conditus (E-BR)
- Chestnut-capped piha, Lipaugus weberi (E-CO)
- Dusky piha, Lipaugus fuscocinereus (E-SA)
- Scimitar-winged piha, Lipaugus uropygialis (E-SA)
- White bellbird, Procnias albus (E-SA)
- Bearded bellbird, Procnias averano (E-SA)
- Bare-throated bellbird, Procnias nudicollis (E-SA)
- Purple-throated cotinga, Porphyrolaema porphyrolaema (E-SA)
- Black-tipped cotinga, Carpodectes hopkei
- Pompadour cotinga, Xipholena punicea (E-SA)
- White-tailed cotinga, Xipholena lamellipennis (E-BR)
- White-winged cotinga, Xipholena atropurpurea (E-BR)
- Bare-necked fruitcrow, Gymnoderus foetidus (E-SA)
- Black-faced cotinga, Conioptilon mcilhennyi (E-SA)

== Tityras ==
Order: Passeriformes Family: Tityridae

Tityridae is a family of suboscine passerine birds found in forest and woodland in the Neotropics. The species in this family were formerly spread over the families Tyrannidae, Pipridae, and Cotingidae. They are small to medium-sized birds. They do not have the sophisticated vocal capabilities of the songbirds. Most, but not all, have plain coloring.

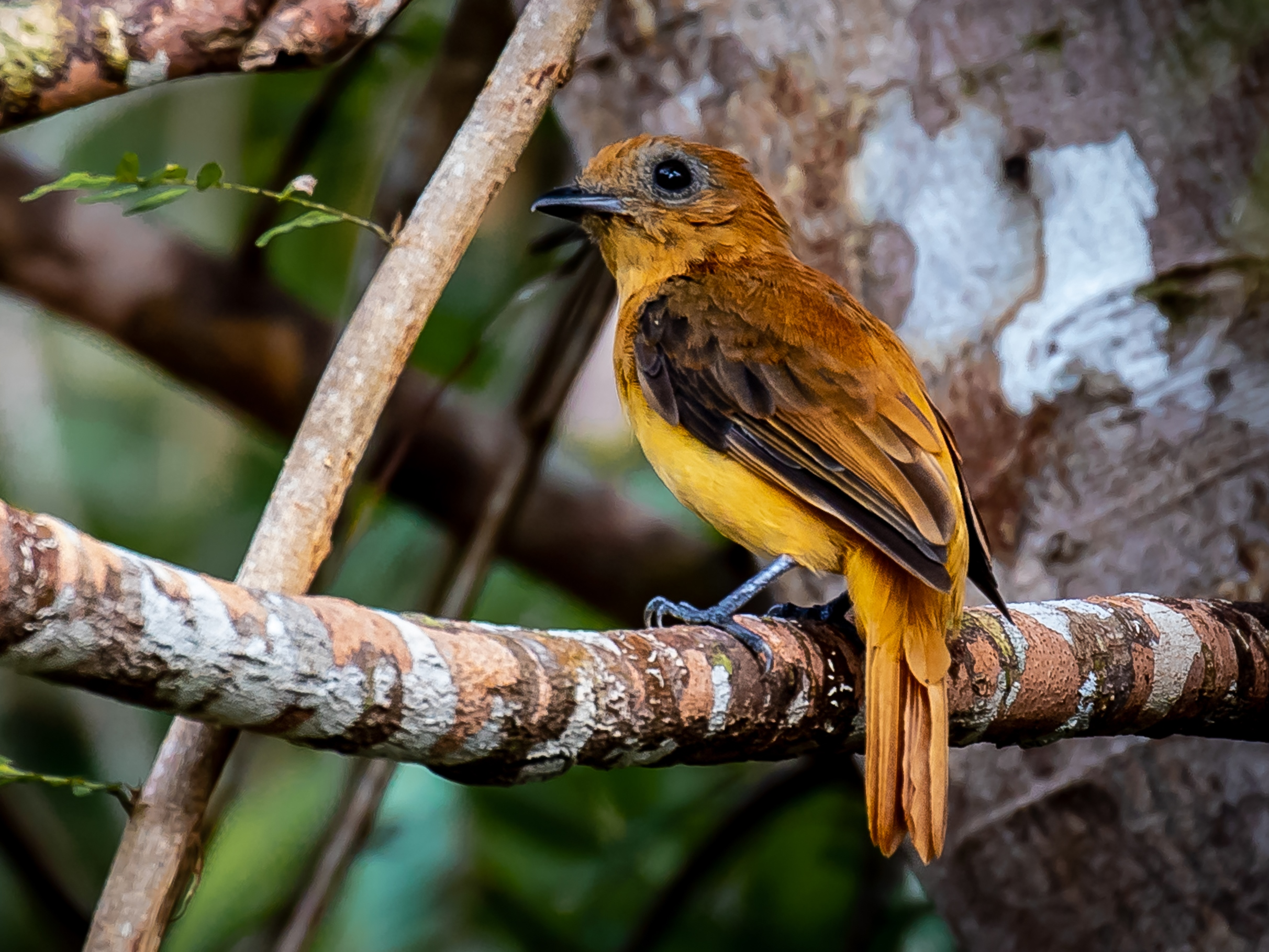
Varzea schiffornis

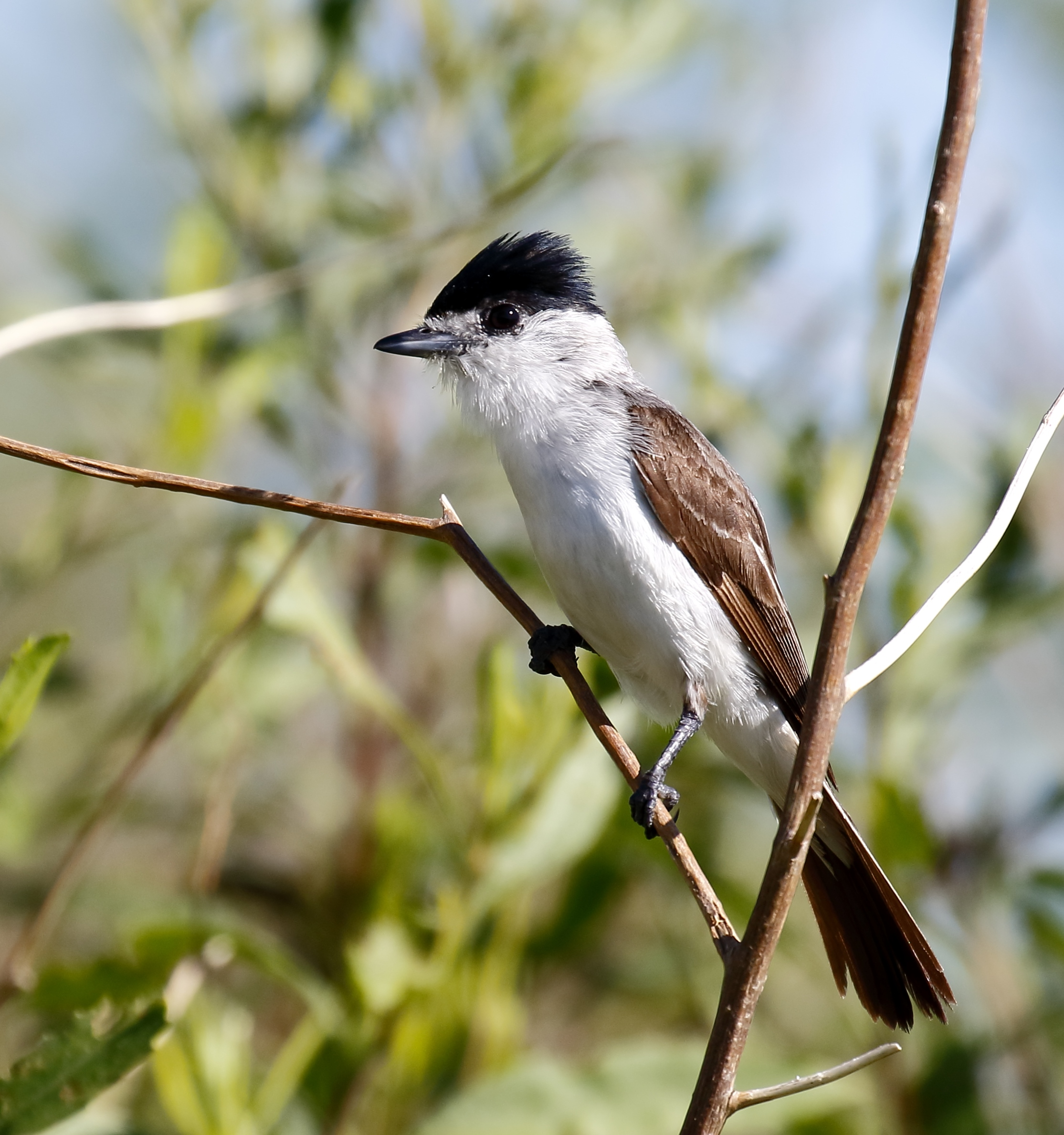
White-naped xenopsaris

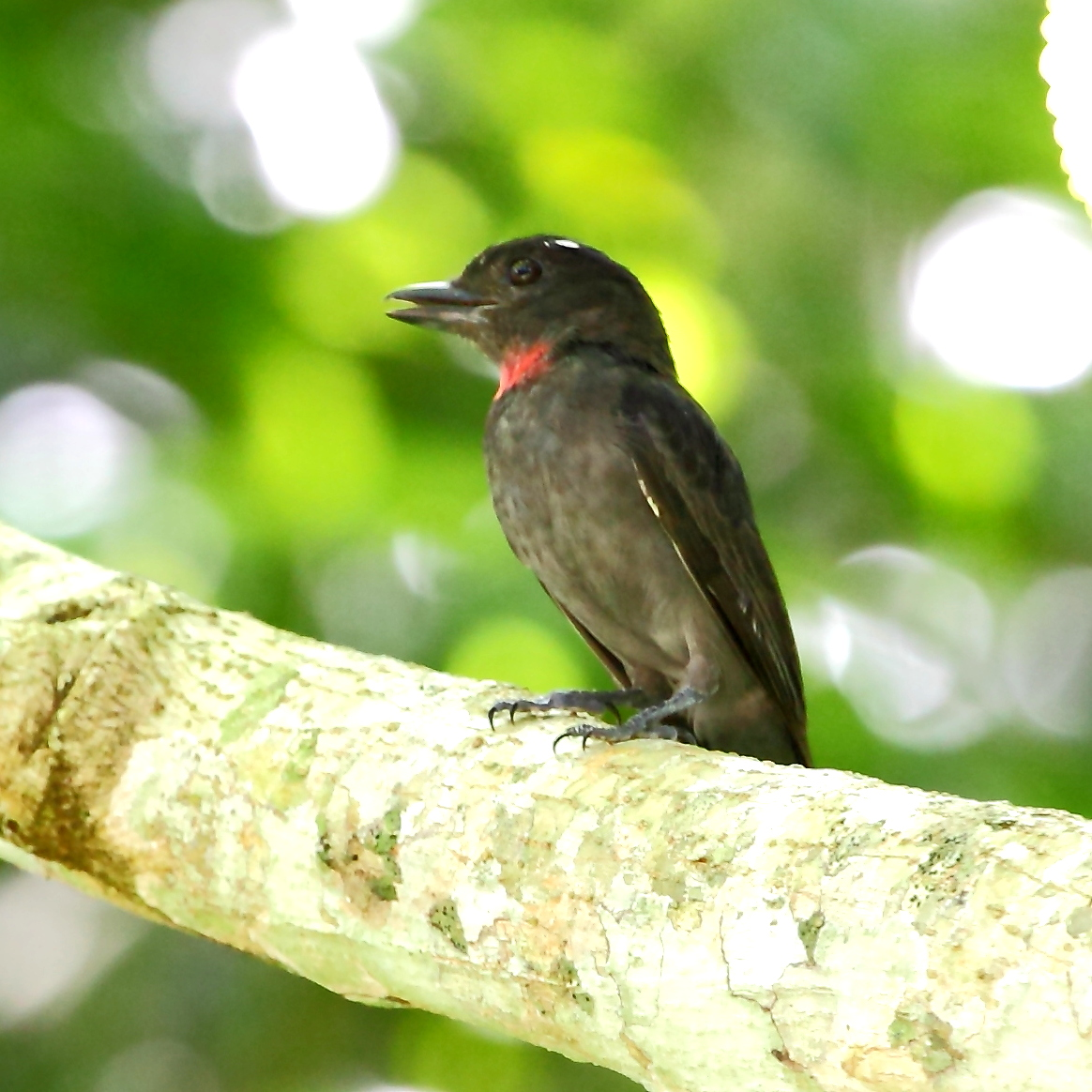
Pink-throated becard
- White-tailed tityra, Tityra leucura (E-BR)
- Black-crowned tityra, Tityra inquisitor
- Black-tailed tityra, Tityra cayana (E-SA)
- Masked tityra, Tityra semifasciata
- Varzea schiffornis, Schiffornis major (E-SA)
- Northern schiffornis, Schiffornis veraepacis
- Foothill schiffornis, Schiffornis aenea (E-SA)
- Olivaceous schiffornis, Schiffornis olivacea (E-SA)
- Russet-winged schiffornis, Schiffornis stenorhyncha
- Brown-winged schiffornis, Schiffornis turdina (E-SA)
- Greenish schiffornis, Schiffornis virescens (E-SA)
- Speckled mourner, Laniocera rufescens
- Cinereous mourner, Laniocera hypopyrra (E-SA)
- White-browed purpletuft, Iodopleura isabellae (E-SA)
- Dusky purpletuft, Iodopleura fusca (E-SA)
- Buff-throated purpletuft, Iodopleura pipra (E-BR)
- Shrike-like cotinga, Laniisoma elegans (E-SA)
- White-naped xenopsaris, Xenopsaris albinucha (E-SA)
- Green-backed becard, Pachyramphus viridis (E-SA)
- Barred becard, Pachyramphus versicolor
- Slaty becard, Pachyramphus spodiurus (E-SA)
- Cinereous becard, Pachyramphus rufus
- Cinnamon becard, Pachyramphus cinnamomeus
- Chestnut-crowned becard, Pachyramphus castaneus (E-SA)
- Cryptic becard, Pachyramphus salvini (E-SA)
- White-winged becard, Pachyramphus polychopterus
- Black-and-white becard, Pachyramphus albogriseus
- Black-capped becard, Pachyramphus marginatus (E-SA)
- Glossy-backed becard, Pachyramphus surinamus (E-SA)
- One-colored becard, Pachyramphus homochrous
- Pink-throated becard, Pachyramphus minor (E-SA)
- Crested becard, Pachyramphus validus (E-SA)

== Sharpbill ==
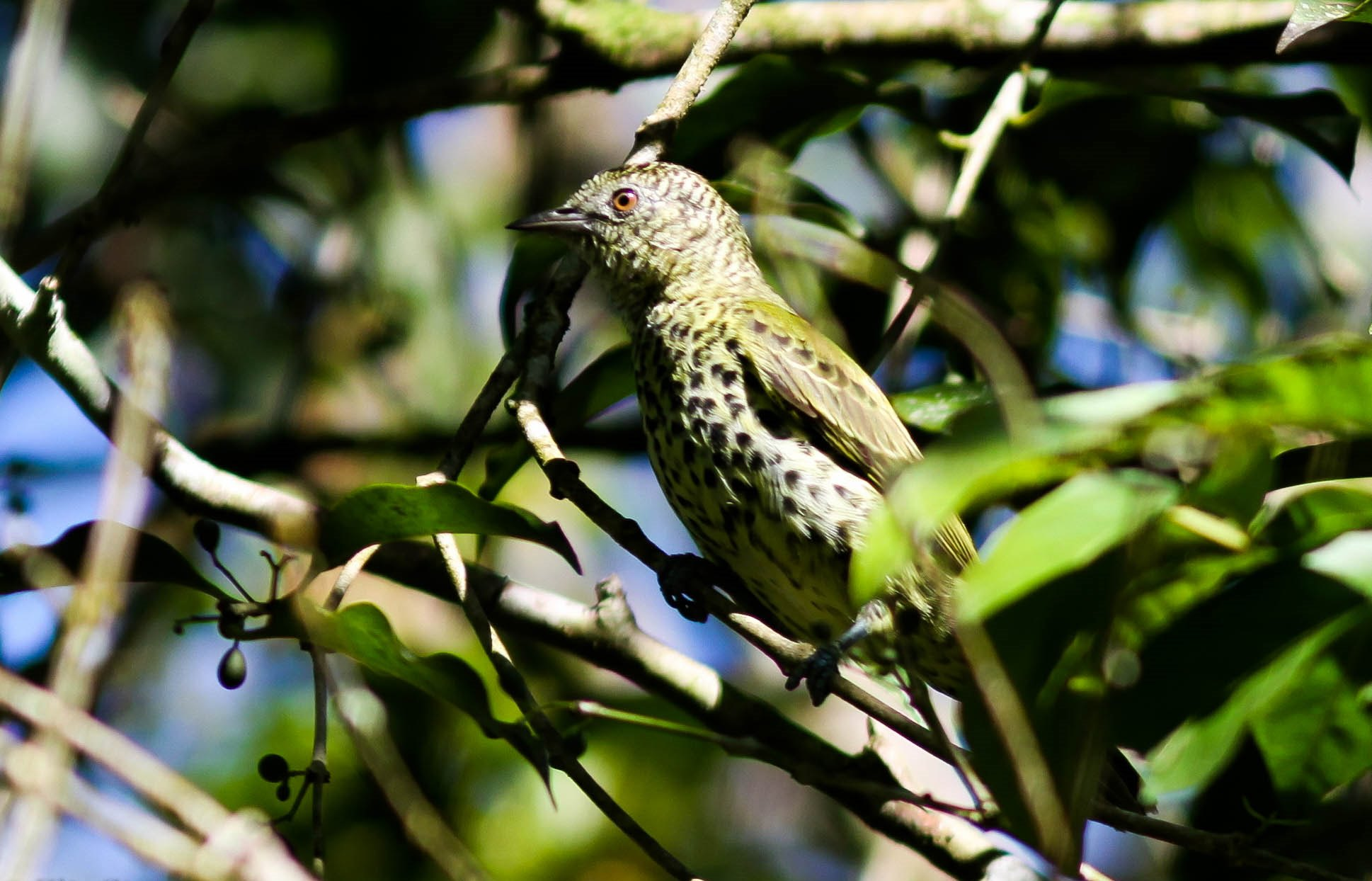
Sharpbill

Order: Passeriformes Family: Oxyruncidae

The sharpbill is a small bird of dense forests in Central and South America. It feeds mostly on fruit but also eats insects.

- Sharpbill, Oxyruncus cristatus

== Royal flycatchers ==
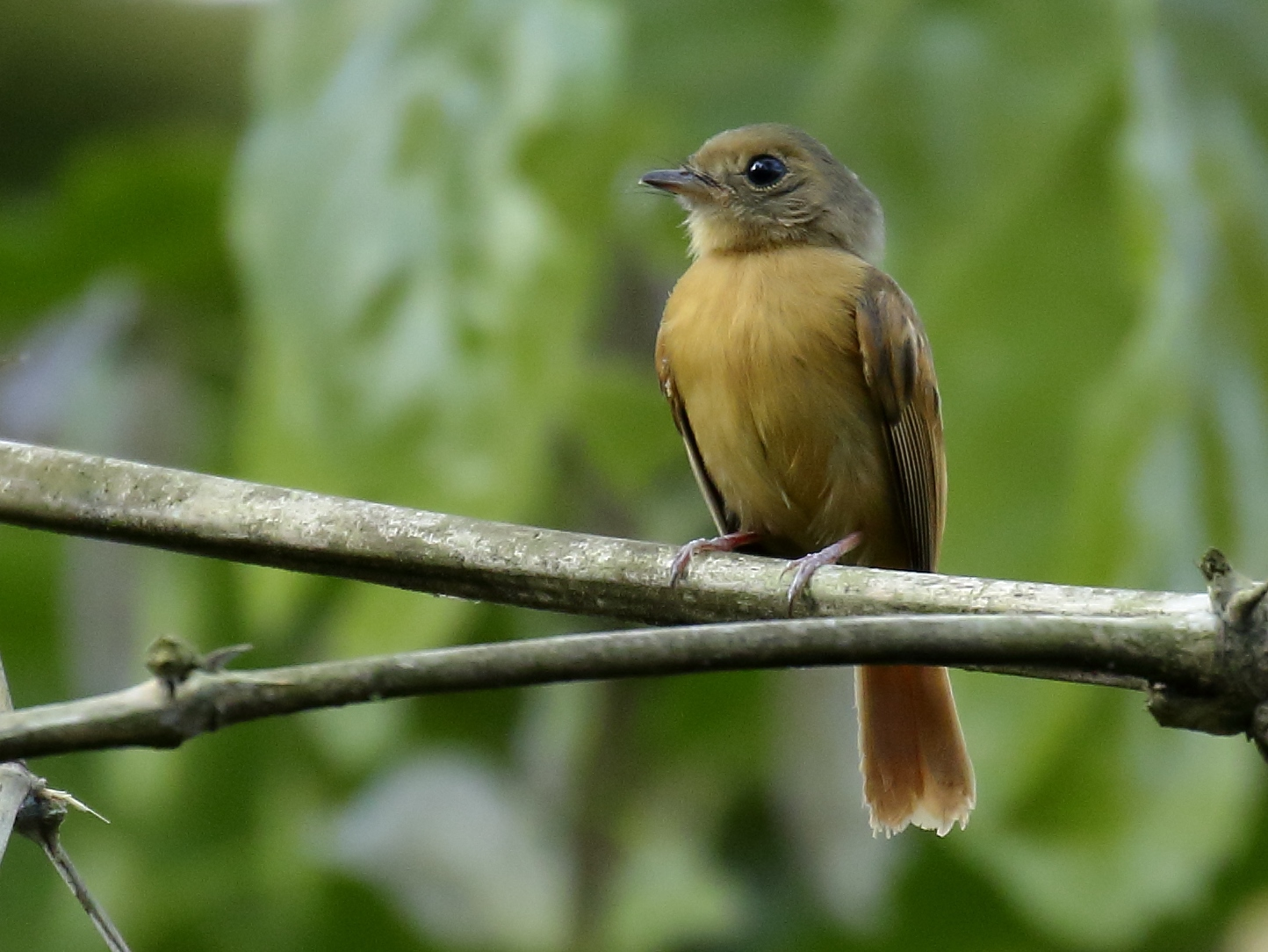
Ruddy-tailed flycatcher

Order: Passeriformes Family: Onychorhynchidae

In 2019 the SACC determined that these species, which were formerly considered tyrant flycatchers, belonged in their own family.

- Tropical royal-flycatcher, Onychorhynchus coronatus
- Atlantic royal-flycatcher, Onychorhynchus swainsoni (E-BR)
- Ruddy-tailed flycatcher, Terenotriccus erythrurus
- Tawny-breasted flycatcher, Myiobius villosus
- Sulphur-rumped flycatcher, Myiobius barbatus
- Black-tailed flycatcher, Myiobius atricaudus

== Tyrant flycatchers ==
Order: Passeriformes Family: Tyrannidae

Tyrant flycatchers are passerine birds which occur throughout North and South America. They superficially resemble the Old World flycatchers, but are more robust and have stronger bills. They do not have the sophisticated vocal capabilities of the songbirds. Most, but not all, have plain coloring. As the name implies, most are insectivorous.

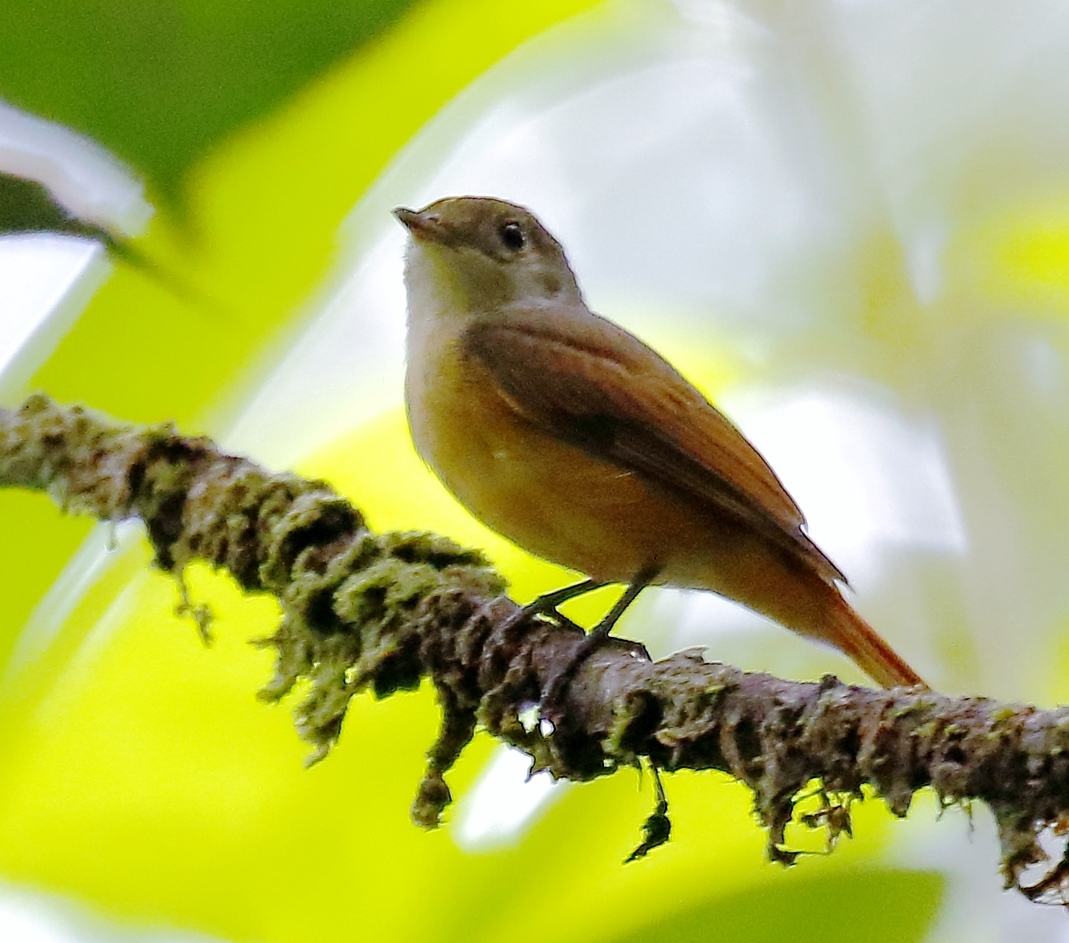
Cinnamon manakin-tyrant

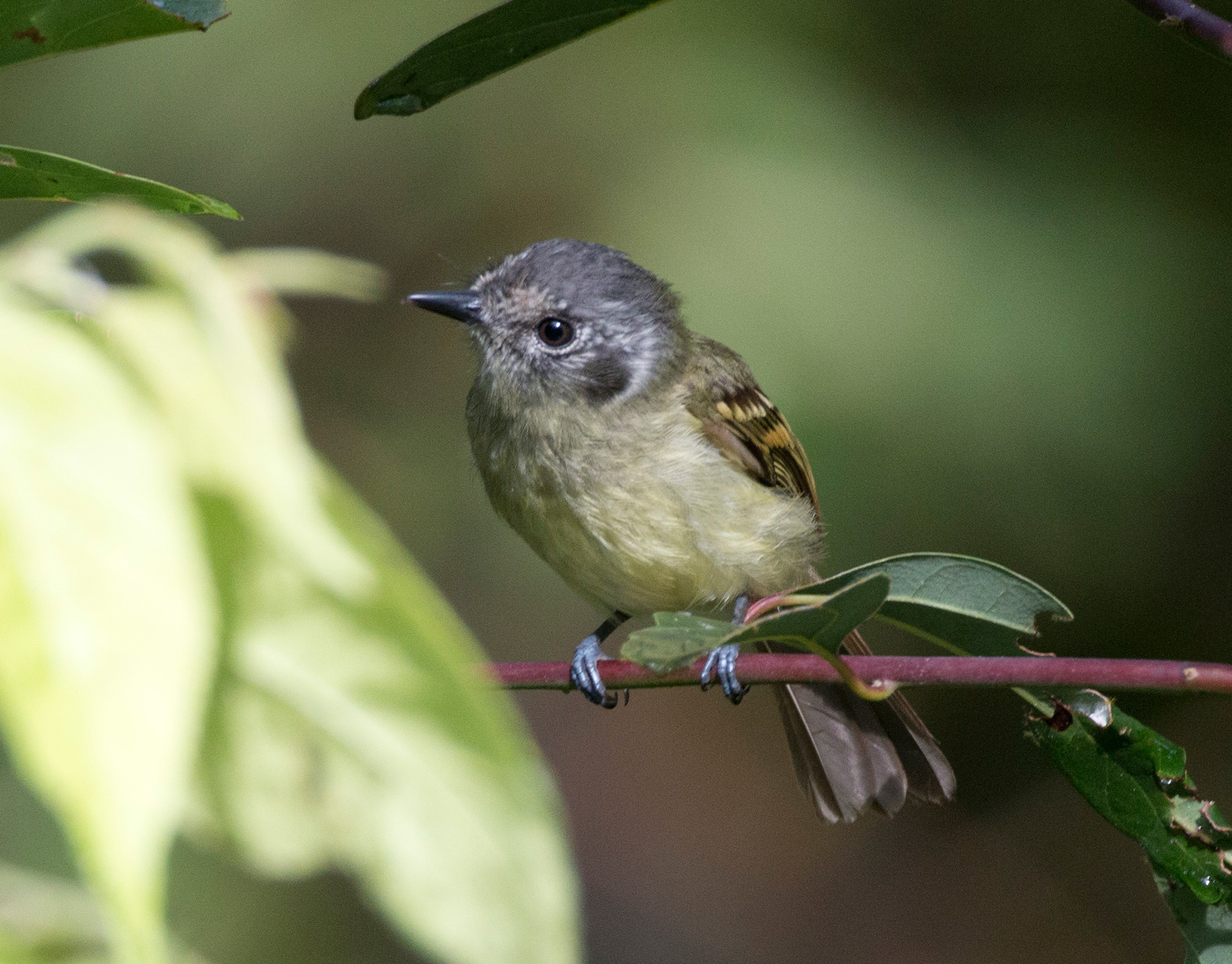
Marble-faced bristle-tyrant

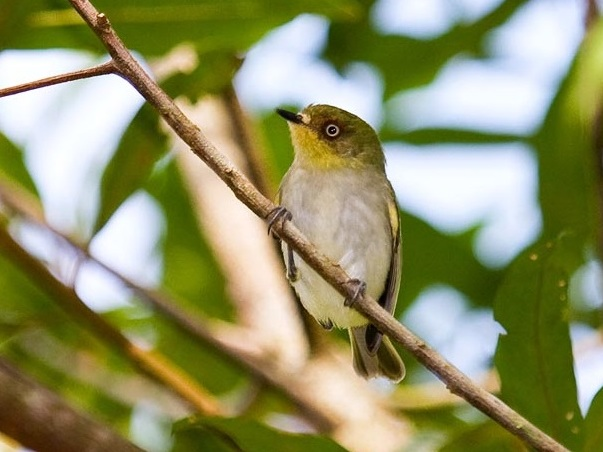
Bay-ringed tyrannulet

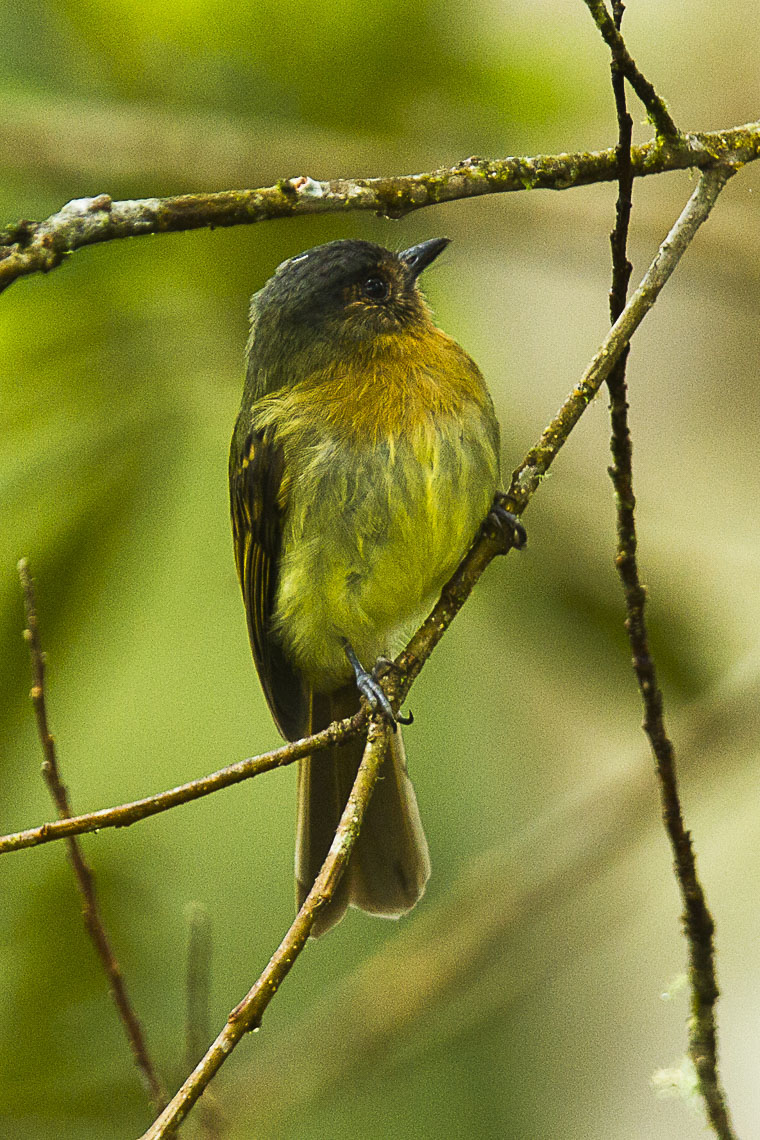
Rufous-breasted flycatcher

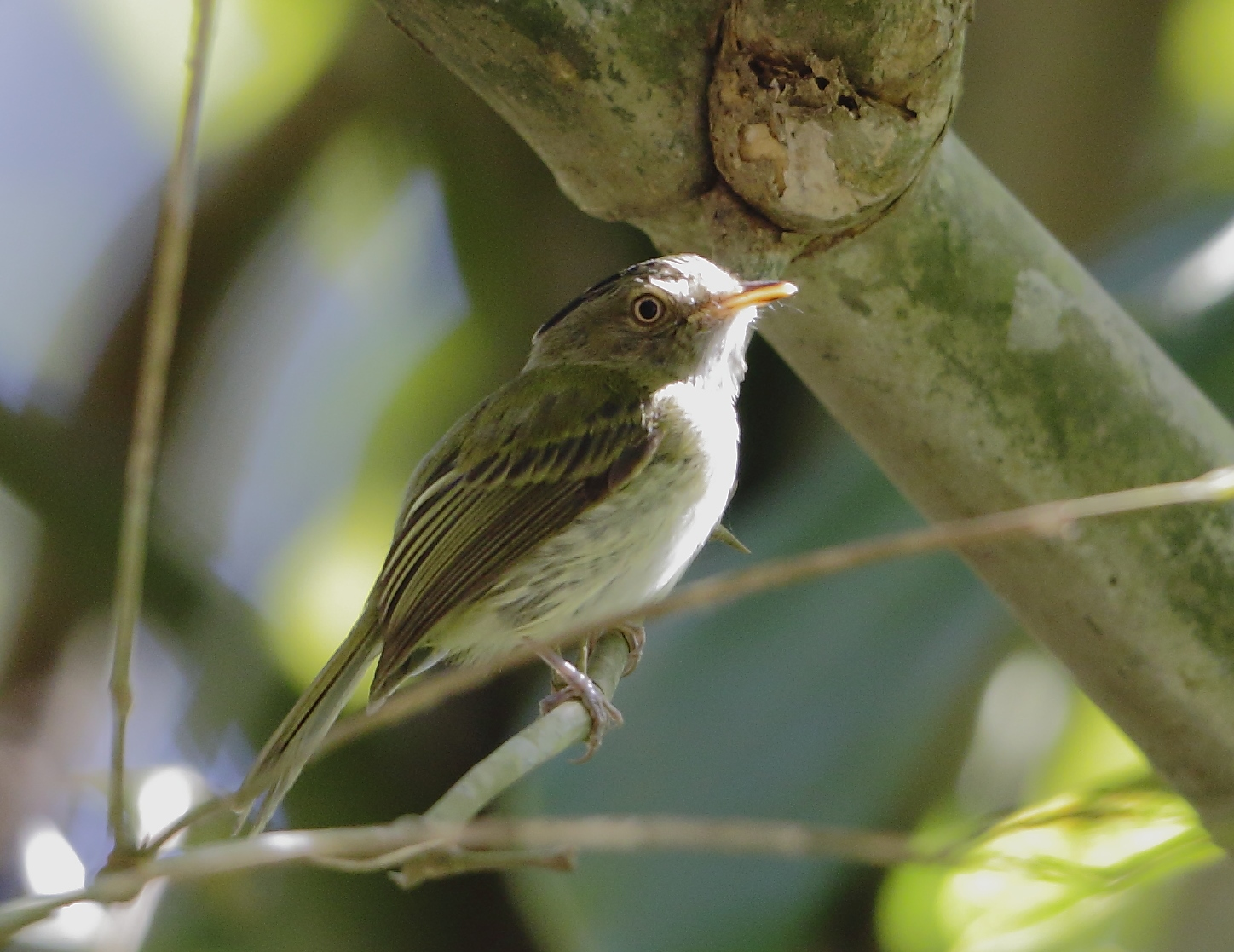
Long-crested pygmy-tyrant

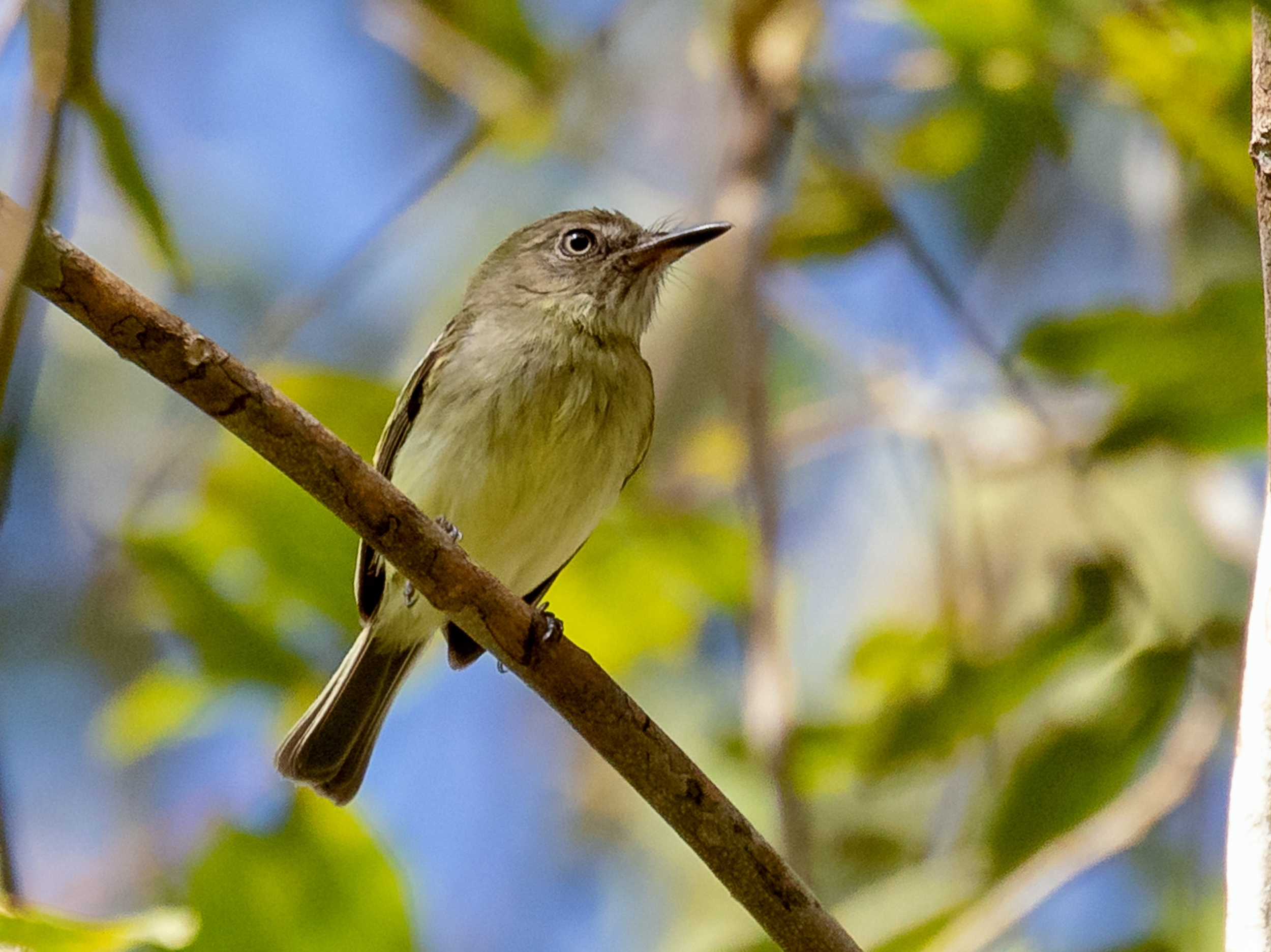
Zimmer's tody-tyrant

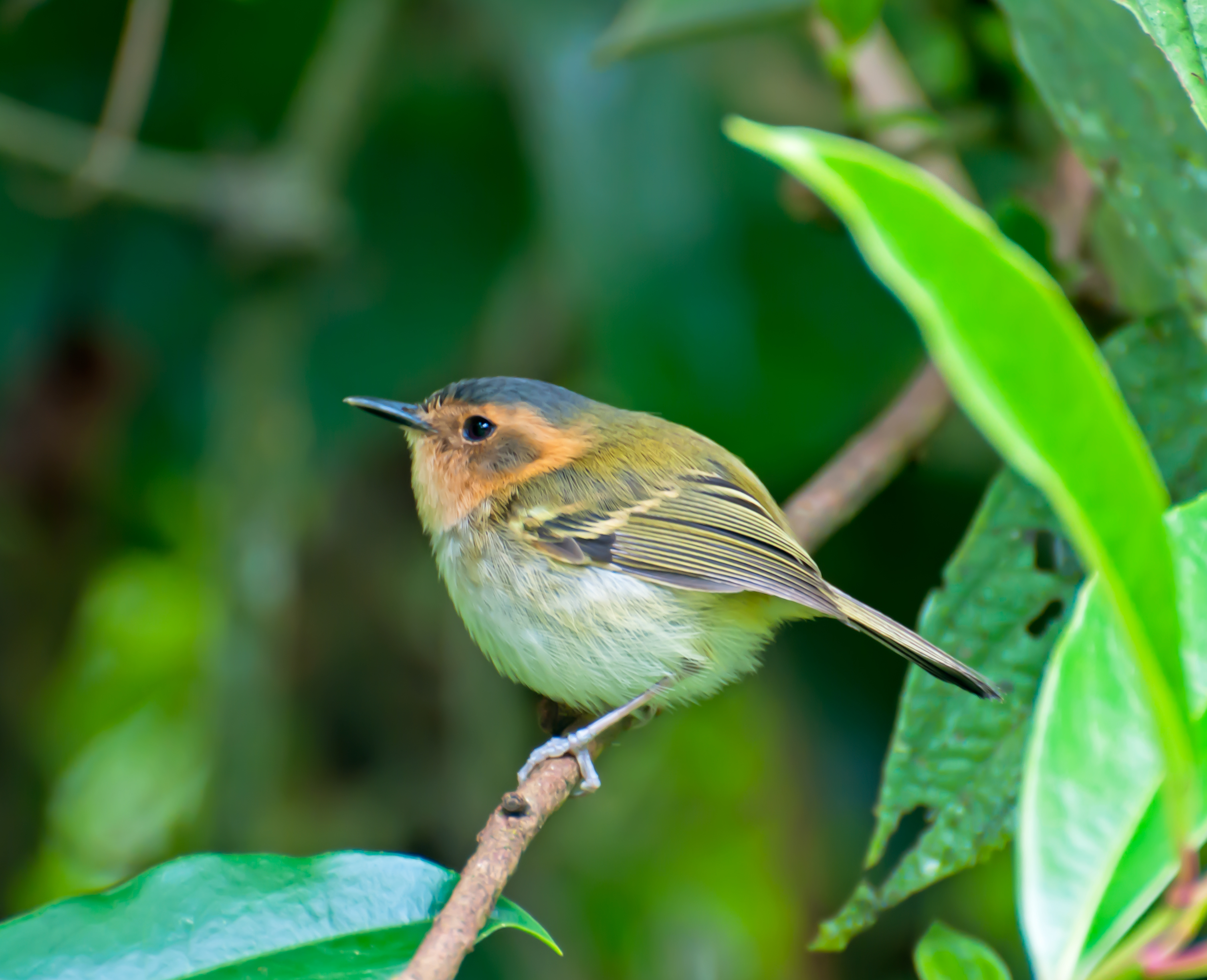
Ochre-faced tody-flycatcher

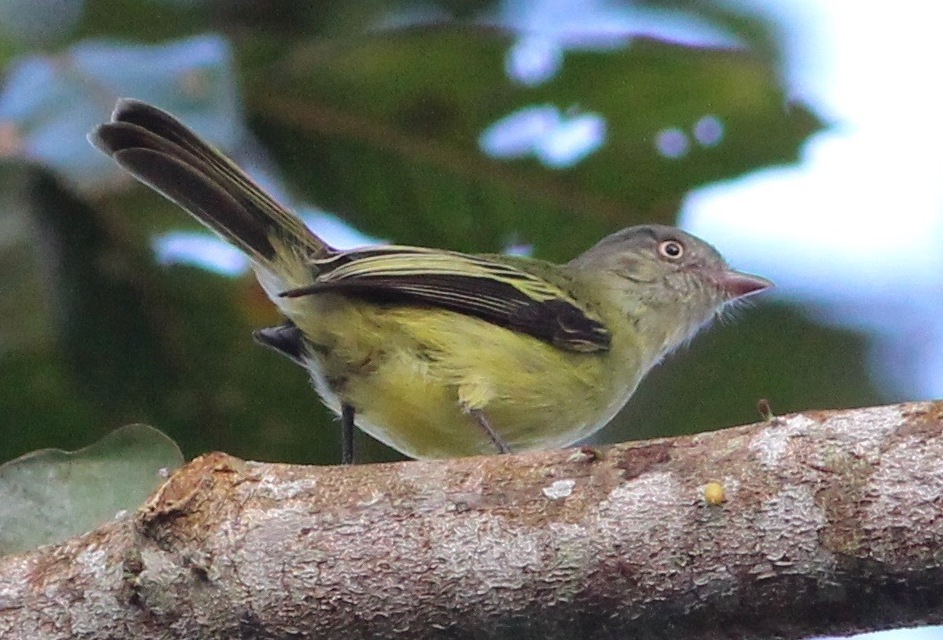
Red-billed tyrannulet

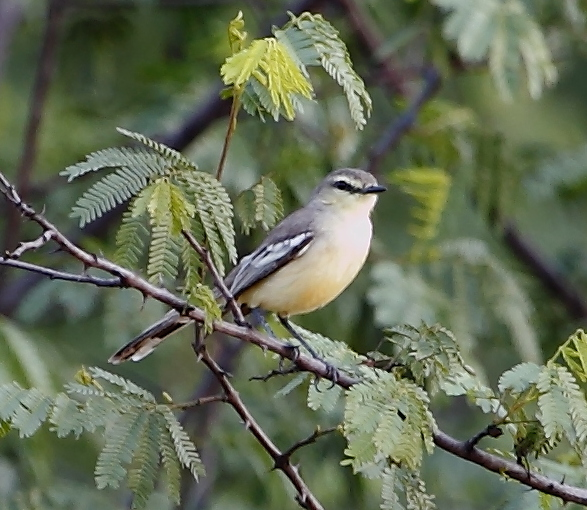
Greater wagtail-tyrant

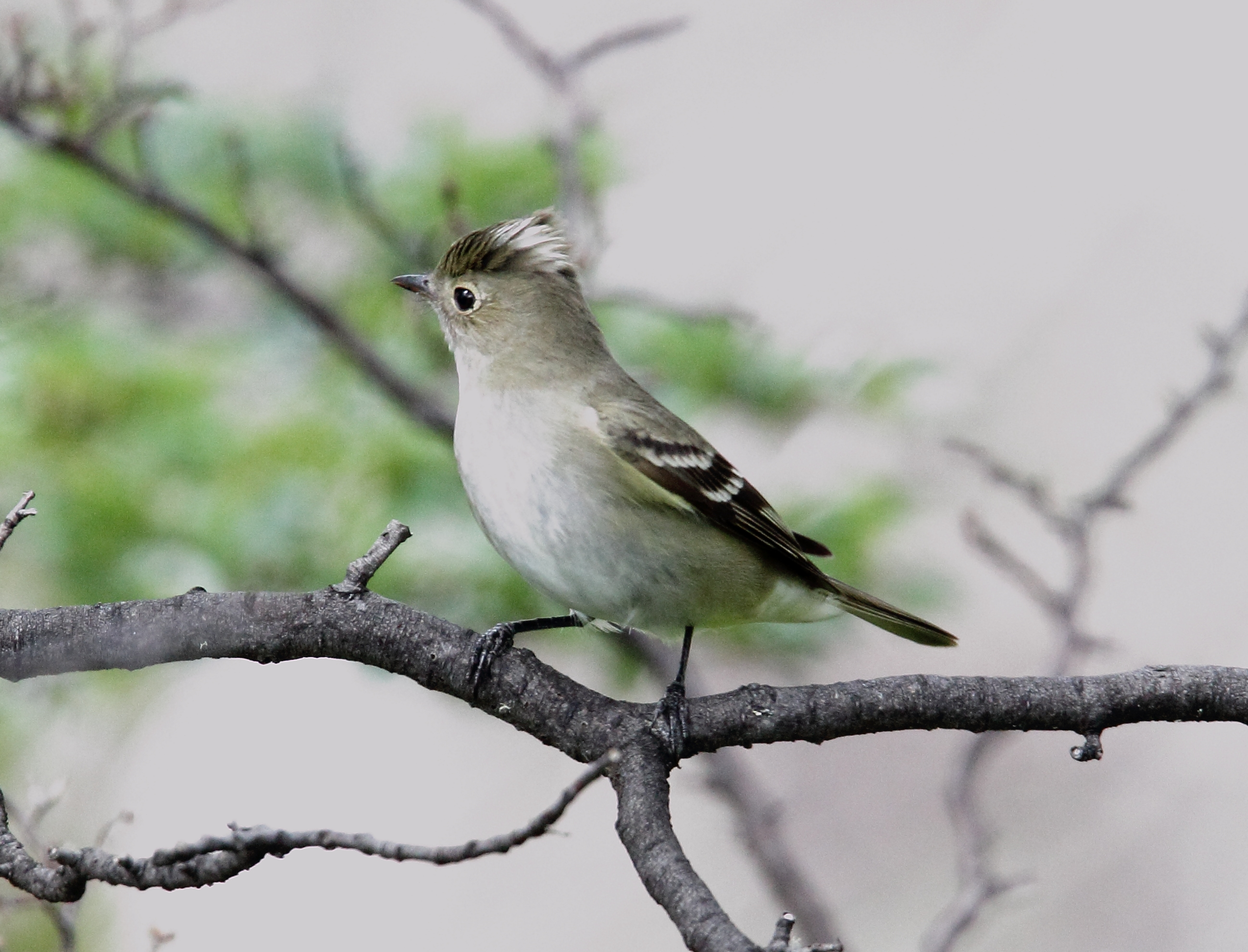
White-crested elaenia

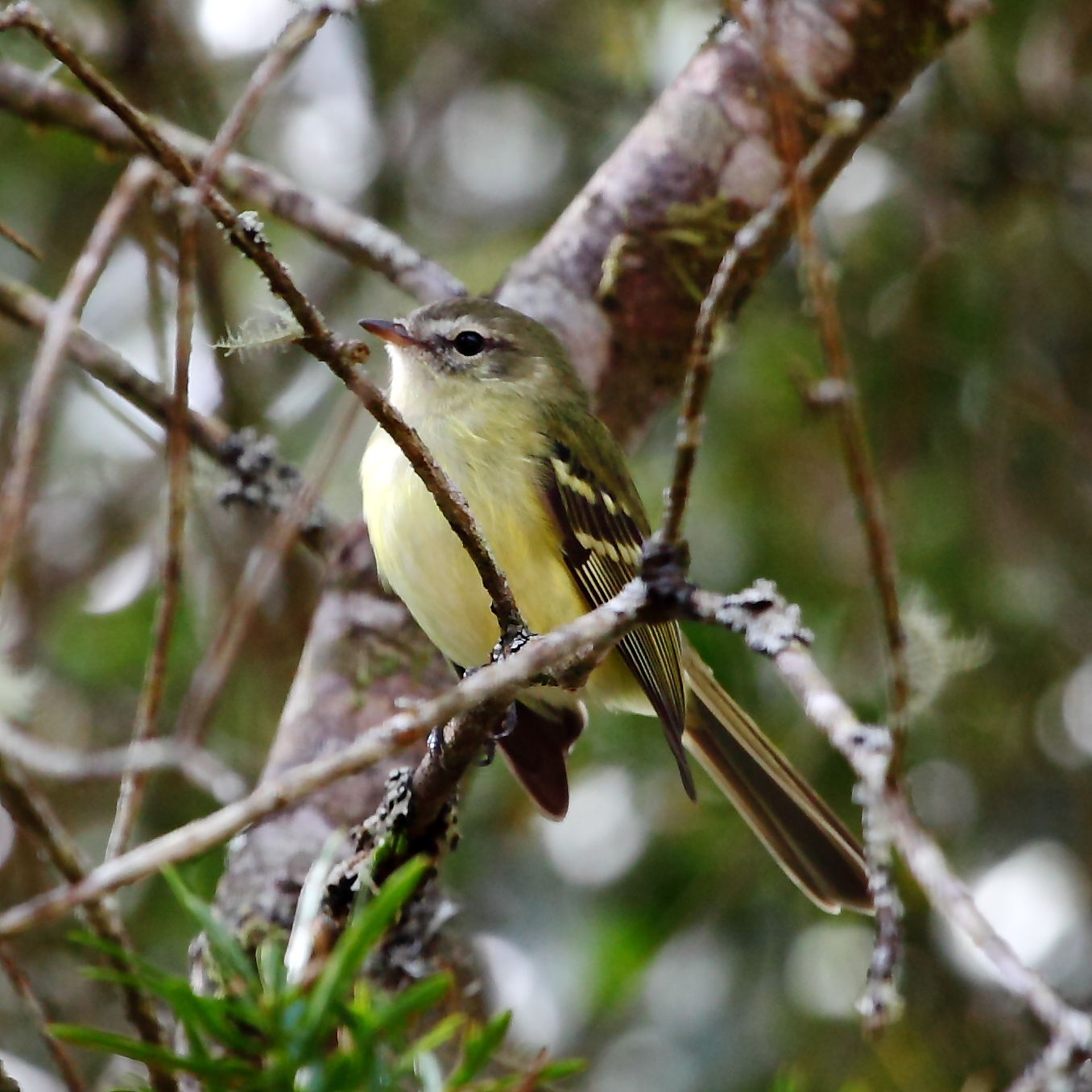
Greenish tyrannulet

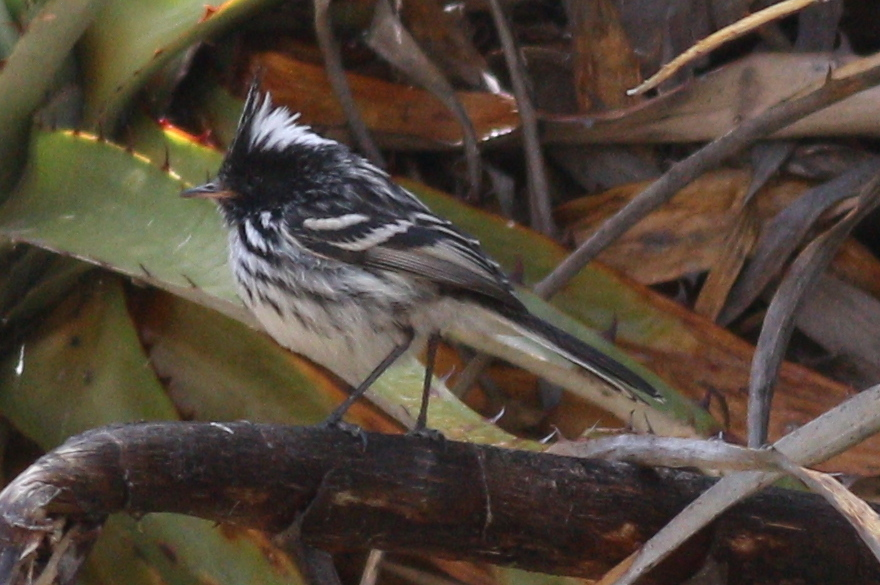
Black-crested tit-tyrant

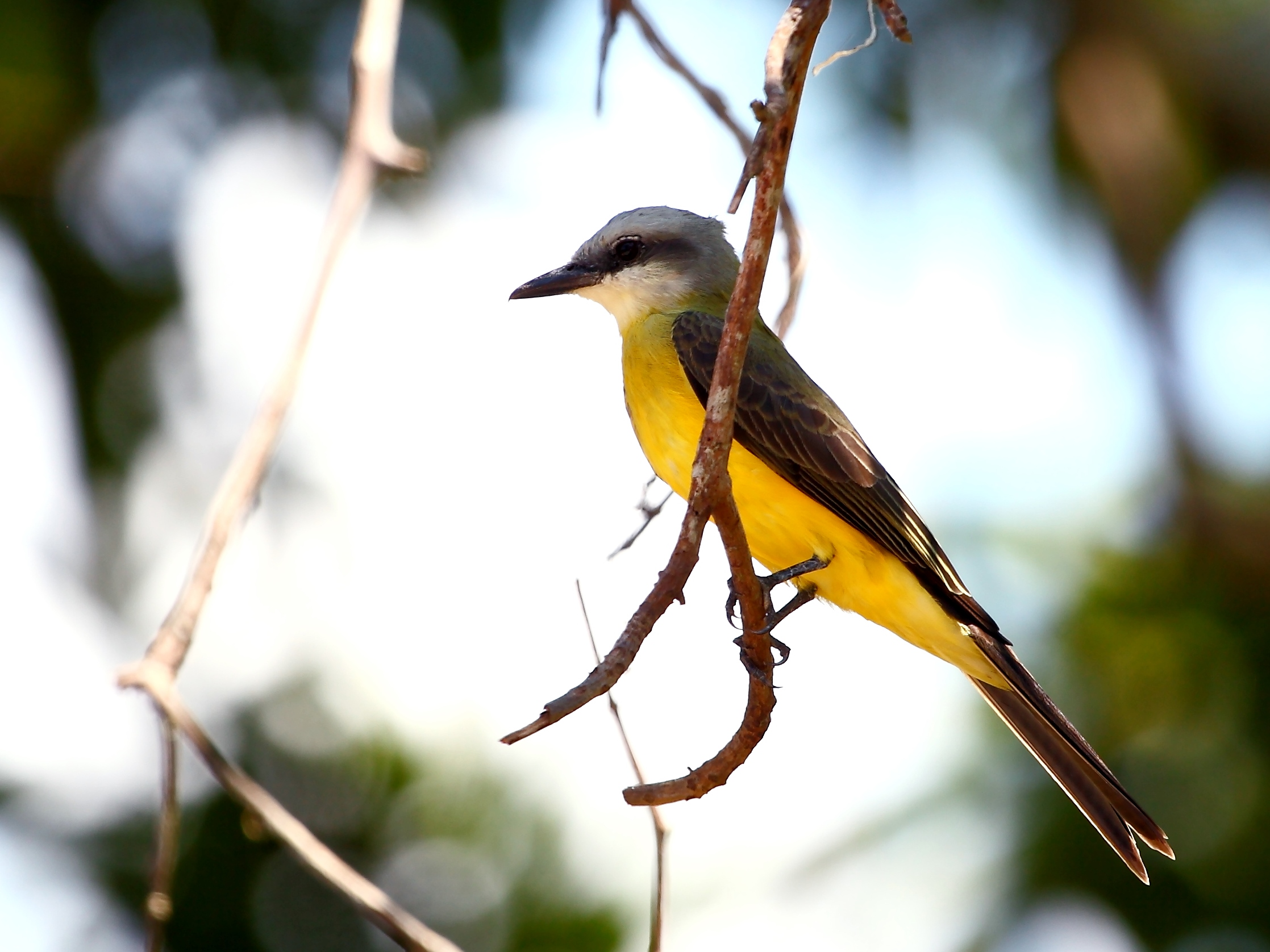
White-throated kingbird

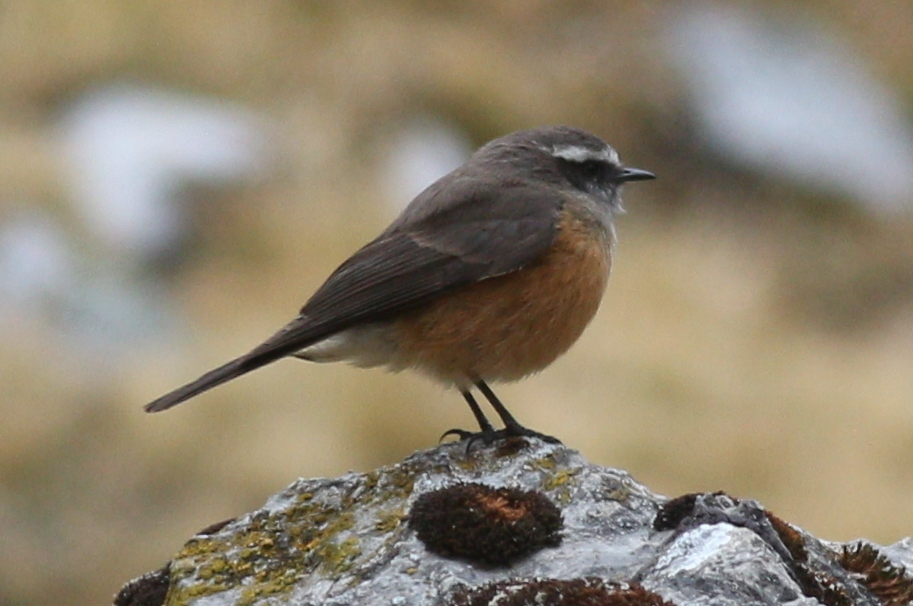
D'Orbigny's chat-tyrant

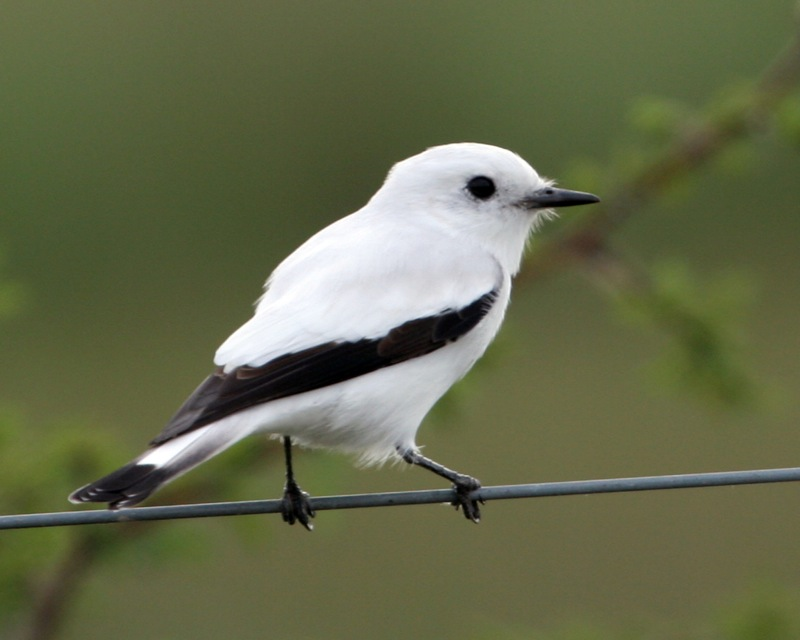
White monjita
- Wing-barred piprites, Piprites chloris (E-SA)
- Black-capped piprites, Piprites pileata (E-SA)
- Kinglet calyptura, Calyptura cristata (E-BR)
- Cinnamon manakin-tyrant, Neopipo cinnamomea (E-SA)
- Cinnamon-crested spadebill, Platyrinchus saturatus (E-SA)
- White-throated spadebill, Platyrinchus mystaceus
- Golden-crowned spadebill, Platyrinchus coronatus
- Yellow-throated spadebill, Platyrinchus flavigularis (E-SA)
- White-crested spadebill, Platyrinchus platyrhynchos (E-SA)
- Russet-winged spadebill, Platyrinchus leucoryphus (E-SA)
- Bronze-olive pygmy-tyrant, Pseudotriccus pelzelni
- Hazel-fronted pygmy-tyrant, Pseudotriccus simplex (E-SA)
- Rufous-headed pygmy-tyrant, Pseudotriccus ruficeps (E-SA)
- Ringed antpipit, Corythopis torquatus (E-SA)
- Southern antpipit, Corythopis delalandi (E-SA)
- Serra do Mar bristle-tyrant, Pogonotriccus difficilis (E-BR)
- Southern bristle-tyrant, Pogonotriccus eximius (E-SA)
- Antioquia bristle-tyrant, Pogonotriccus lanyoni (E-CO)
- Marble-faced bristle-tyrant, Pogonotriccus ophthalmicus (E-SA)
- São Paulo bristle-tyrant, Pogonotriccus paulista (E-SA)
- Variegated bristle-tyrant, Pogonotriccus poecilotis (E-SA)
- Venezuelan bristle-tyrant, Pogonotriccus venezuelanus (E-VE)
- Spectacled bristle-tyrant, Pogonotriccus orbitalis (E-SA)
- Chapman's bristle-tyrant, Pogonotriccus chapmani (E-SA)
- Mottle-cheeked tyrannulet, Phylloscartes ventralis (E-SA)
- Restinga tyrannulet, Phylloscartes kronei (E-BR)
- Bahia tyrannulet, Phylloscartes beckeri (E-BR)
- Olive-green tyrannulet, Phylloscartes virescens (E-SA)
- Ecuadorian tyrannulet, Phylloscartes gualaquizae (E-SA)
- Black-fronted tyrannulet, Phylloscartes nigrifrons (E-SA)
- Rufous-browed tyrannulet, Phylloscartes superciliaris
- Alagoas tyrannulet, Phylloscartes ceciliae (E-BR)
- Rufous-lored tyrannulet, Phylloscartes flaviventris (E-VE)
- Cinnamon-faced tyrannulet, Phylloscartes parkeri (E-SA)
- Minas Gerais tyrannulet, Phylloscartes roquettei (E-BR)
- Oustalet's tyrannulet, Phylloscartes oustaleti (E-BR)
- Bay-ringed tyrannulet, Phylloscartes sylviolus (E-SA)
- Streak-necked flycatcher, Mionectes striaticollis (E-SA)
- Olive-striped flycatcher, Mionectes olivaceus
- Ochre-bellied flycatcher, Mionectes oleagineus
- McConnell's flycatcher, Mionectes macconnelli (E-SA)
- Sierra de Lema flycatcher, Mionectes roraimae (E-SA)
- Gray-hooded flycatcher, Mionectes rufiventris (E-SA)
- Sepia-capped flycatcher, Leptopogon amaurocephalus
- Slaty-capped flycatcher, Leptopogon superciliaris
- Rufous-breasted flycatcher, Leptopogon rufipectus (E-SA)
- Inca flycatcher, Leptopogon taczanowskii (E-PE)
- Black-chested tyrant, Taeniotriccus andrei (E-SA)
- Brownish twistwing, Cnipodectes subbrunneus
- Rufous twistwing, Cnipodectes superrufus (E-SA)
- Olivaceous flatbill, Rhynchocyclus olivaceus
- Eye-ringed flatbill, Rhynchocyclus brevirostris
- Pacific flatbill, Rhynchocyclus pacificus (E-SA)
- Fulvous-breasted flatbill, Rhynchocyclus fulvipectus (E-SA)
- Yellow-winged flatbill, Tolmomyias flavotectus
- Orange-eyed flatbill, Tolmomyias traylori (E-SA)
- Yellow-margined flatbill, Tolmomyias assimilis (E-SA)
- Gray-crowned flatbill, Tolmomyias poliocephalus (E-SA)
- Yellow-breasted flatbill, Tolmomyias flaviventris
- Olive-faced flatbill, Tolmomyias viridiceps (E-SA)
- Yellow-olive flatbill, Tolmomyias sulphurescens
- Eared pygmy-tyrant, Myiornis auricularis (E-SA)
- White-bellied pygmy-tyrant, Myiornis albiventris (E-SA)
- Black-capped pygmy-tyrant, Myiornis atricapillus
- Short-tailed pygmy-tyrant, Myiornis ecaudatus (E-SA)
- Northern bentbill, Oncostoma cinereigulare (V)
- Southern bentbill, Oncostoma olivaceum
- Scale-crested pygmy-tyrant, Lophotriccus pileatus
- Double-banded pygmy-tyrant, Lophotriccus vitiosus (E-SA)
- Long-crested pygmy-tyrant, Lophotriccus eulophotes (E-SA)
- Helmeted pygmy-tyrant, Lophotriccus galeatus (E-SA)
- Pale-eyed pygmy-tyrant, Atalotriccus pilaris
- Snethlage's tody-tyrant, Hemitriccus minor (E-SA)
- Acre tody-tyrant, Hemitriccus cohnhafti (E-SA)
- Yungas tody-tyrant, Hemitriccus spodiops (E-SA)
- Flammulated pygmy-tyrant, Hemitriccus flammulatus (E-SA)
- Drab-breasted pygmy-tyrant, Hemitriccus diops (E-SA)
- Brown-breasted pygmy-tyrant, Hemitriccus obsoletus (E-SA)
- Boat-billed tody-tyrant, Hemitriccus josephinae (E-SA)
- White-eyed tody-tyrant, Hemitriccus zosterops (E-SA)
- White-bellied tody-tyrant, Hemitriccus griseipectus (E-SA)
- Eye-ringed tody-tyrant, Hemitriccus orbitatus (E-BR)
- Johannes's tody-tyrant, Hemitriccus iohannis (E-SA)
- Stripe-necked tody-tyrant, Hemitriccus striaticollis (E-SA)
- Hangnest tody-tyrant, Hemitriccus nidipendulus (E-BR)
- Pearly-vented tody-tyrant, Hemitriccus margaritaceiventer (E-SA)
- Pelzeln's tody-tyrant, Hemitriccus inornatus (E-SA)
- Zimmer's tody-tyrant, Hemitriccus minimus (E-SA)
- Black-throated tody-tyrant, Hemitriccus granadensis (E-SA)
- Cinnamon-breasted tody-tyrant, Hemitriccus cinnamomeipectus (E-SA)
- Buff-breasted tody-tyrant, Hemitriccus mirandae (E-BR)
- Kaempfer's tody-tyrant, Hemitriccus kaempferi (E-BR)
- Buff-throated tody-tyrant, Hemitriccus rufigularis (E-SA)
- Fork-tailed pygmy-tyrant, Hemitriccus furcatus (E-BR)
- Rufous-crowned tody-flycatcher, Poecilotriccus ruficeps (E-SA)
- Johnson's tody-flycatcher, Poecilotriccus luluae (E-PE)
- White-cheeked tody-flycatcher, Poecilotriccus albifacies (E-SA)
- Black-and-white tody-flycatcher, Poecilotriccus capitalis (E-SA)
- Buff-cheeked tody-flycatcher, Poecilotriccus senex (E-BR)
- Ruddy tody-flycatcher, Poecilotriccus russatus (E-SA)
- Ochre-faced tody-flycatcher, Poecilotriccus plumbeiceps (E-SA)
- Smoky-fronted tody-flycatcher, Poecilotriccus fumifrons (E-SA)
- Rusty-fronted tody-flycatcher, Poecilotriccus latirostris (E-SA)
- Slate-headed tody-flycatcher, Poecilotriccus sylvia
- Golden-winged tody-flycatcher, Poecilotriccus calopterus (E-SA)
- Black-backed tody-flycatcher, Poecilotriccus pulchellus (E-PE)
- Spotted tody-flycatcher, Todirostrum maculatum (E-SA)
- Gray-headed tody-flycatcher, Todirostrum poliocephalum (E-BR)
- Common tody-flycatcher, Todirostrum cinereum
- Maracaibo tody-flycatcher, Todirostrum viridanum (E-VE)
- Black-headed tody-flycatcher, Todirostrum nigriceps
- Painted tody-flycatcher, Todirostrum pictum (E-SA)
- Yellow-browed tody-flycatcher, Todirostrum chrysocrotaphum (E-SA)
- Ornate flycatcher, Myiotriccus ornatus (E-SA)
- Handsome flycatcher, Nephelomyias pulcher (E-SA)
- Orange-banded flycatcher, Nephelomyias lintoni (E-SA)
- Ochraceous-breasted flycatcher, Nephelomyias ochraceiventris (E-SA)
- Cliff flycatcher, Hirundinea ferruginea (E-SA)
- Cinnamon flycatcher, Pyrrhomyias cinnamomeus (E-SA)
- Mistletoe tyrannulet, Zimmerius vilissimus
- Venezuelan tyrannulet, Zimmerius petersi (E-VE)
- Spectacled tyrannulet, Zimmerius improbus (E-SA)
- Choco tyrannulet, Zimmerius albigularis (E-SA)
- Bolivian tyrannulet, Zimmerius bolivianus (E-SA)
- Red-billed tyrannulet, Zimmerius cinereicapilla (E-SA)
- Mishana tyrannulet, Zimmerius villarejoi (E-PE)
- Chico's tyrannulet, Zimmerius chicomendesi (E-BR)
- Slender-footed tyrannulet, Zimmerius gracilipes (E-SA)
- Guianan tyrannulet, Zimmerius acer (E-SA)
- Golden-faced tyrannulet, Zimmerius chrysops (E-SA)
- Peruvian tyrannulet, Zimmerius viridiflavus (E-SA)
- Lesser wagtail-tyrant, Stigmatura napensis (E-SA)
- Greater wagtail-tyrant, Stigmatura budytoides (E-SA)
- Slender-billed tyrannulet, Inezia tenuirostris (E-SA)
- Plain tyrannulet, Inezia inornata (E-SA)
- Amazonian tyrannulet, Inezia subflava (E-SA)
- Pale-tipped tyrannulet, Inezia caudata (E-SA)
- Fulvous-crowned scrub-tyrant, Euscarthmus meloryphus (E-SA)
- Fulvous-faced scrub-tyrant, Euscarthmus fulviceps (E-SA)
- Rufous-sided scrub-tyrant, Euscarthmus rufomarginatus (E-SA)
- Yellow-bellied elaenia, Elaenia flavogaster
- Caribbean elaenia, Elaenia martinica
- Large elaenia, Elaenia spectabilis (E-SA)
- Noronha elaenia, Elaenia ridleyana (E-BR)
- White-crested elaenia, Elaenia albiceps (E-SA)
- Small-billed elaenia, Elaenia parvirostris (E-SA)
- Olivaceous elaenia, Elaenia mesoleuca (E-SA)
- Slaty elaenia, Elaenia strepera (E-SA)
- Mottle-backed elaenia, Elaenia gigas (E-SA)
- Brownish elaenia, Elaenia pelzelni (E-SA)
- Plain-crested elaenia, Elaenia cristata (E-SA)
- Lesser elaenia, Elaenia chiriquensis
- Coopmans's elaenia, Elaenia brachyptera (E-SA)
- Rufous-crowned elaenia, Elaenia ruficeps (E-SA)
- Mountain elaenia, Elaenia frantzii
- Tepui elaenia, Elaenia olivina (E-SA)
- Highland elaenia, Elaenia obscura (E-SA)
- Great elaenia, Elaenia dayi (E-SA)
- Small-headed elaenia, Elaenia sordida (E-SA)
- Sierran elaenia, Elaenia pallatangae (E-SA)
- Yellow-crowned tyrannulet, Tyrannulus elatus
- Forest elaenia, Myiopagis gaimardii
- Gray elaenia, Myiopagis caniceps
- Foothill elaenia, Myiopagis olallai (E-SA)
- Pacific elaenia, Myiopagis subplacens (E-SA)
- Yellow-crowned elaenia, Myiopagis flavivertex (E-SA)
- Greenish elaenia, Myiopagis viridicata
- Suiriri flycatcher, Suiriri suiriri (E-SA)
- Yellow tyrannulet, Capsiempis flaveola
- White-tailed tyrannulet, Mecocerculus poecilocercus (E-SA)
- Buff-banded tyrannulet, Mecocerculus hellmayri (E-SA)
- White-banded tyrannulet, Mecocerculus stictopterus (E-SA)
- White-throated tyrannulet, Mecocerculus leucophrys (E-SA)
- Rufous-winged tyrannulet, Mecocerculus calopterus (E-SA)
- Sulphur-bellied tyrannulet, Mecocerculus minor (E-SA)
- Greenish tyrannulet, Phyllomyias virescens (E-SA)
- Reiser's tyrannulet, Phyllomyias reiseri (E-SA)
- Urich's tyrannulet, Phyllomyias urichi (E-VE)
- Sclater's tyrannulet, Phyllomyias sclateri (E-SA)
- Yungas tyrannulet, Phyllomyias weedeni (E-SA)
- Planalto tyrannulet, Phyllomyias fasciatus (E-SA)
- Sooty-headed tyrannulet, Phyllomyias griseiceps
- Plumbeous-crowned tyrannulet, Phyllomyias plumbeiceps (E-SA)
- Gray-capped tyrannulet, Phyllomyias griseocapilla (E-BR)
- White-fronted tyrannulet, Acrochordopus zeledoni
- Rough-legged tyrannulet, Acrochordopus burmeisteri (E-SA)
- Ashy-headed tyrannulet, Tyranniscus cinereiceps (E-SA)
- Black-capped tyrannulet, Tyranniscus nigrocapillus (E-SA)
- Tawny-rumped tyrannulet, Tyranniscus uropygialis (E-SA)
- Venezuelan beardless-tyrannulet, Camptostoma pusillum (E-SA)
- Cauca beardless-tyrannulet, Camptostoma caucae (E-CO)
- Pacific beardless-tyrannulet, Camptostoma sclateri (E-SA)
- Amazonian beardless-tyrannulet, Camptostoma napaeum (E-SA)
- Southeastern beardless-tyrannulet, Camptostoma obsoletum (E-SA)
- Brown-capped tyrannulet, Ornithion brunneicapillus
- White-lored tyrannulet, Ornithion inerme (E-SA)
- Mouse-colored tyrannulet, Nesotriccus murinus
- Marañon tyrannulet, Nesotriccus maranonicus (E-SA)
- Tumbesian tyrannulet, Nesotriccus tumbezanus (E-SA)
- Gray-and-white tyrannulet, Pseudelaenia leucospodia (E-SA)
- Black-crested tit-tyrant, Anairetes nigrocristatus (E-SA)
- Pied-crested tit-tyrant, Anairetes reguloides (E-SA)
- Ash-breasted tit-tyrant, Anairetes alpinus (E-SA)
- Yellow-billed tit-tyrant, Anairetes flavirostris (E-SA)
- Tufted tit-tyrant, Anairetes parulus (E-SA)
- Juan Fernandez tit-tyrant, Anairetes fernandezianus (E-CH)
- Bearded tachuri, Polystictus pectoralis (E-SA)
- Gray-backed tachuri, Polystictus superciliaris (E-BR)
- Sharp-tailed tyrant, Culicivora caudacuta (E-SA)
- Crested doradito, Pseudocolopteryx sclateri (E-SA)
- Subtropical doradito, Pseudocolopteryx acutipennis (E-SA)
- Dinelli's doradito, Pseudocolopteryx dinelliana (E-SA)
- Warbling doradito, Pseudocolopteryx flaviventris (E-SA)
- Ticking doradito, Pseudocolopteryx citreola (E-SA)
- Torrent tyrannulet, Serpophaga cinerea
- River tyrannulet, Serpophaga hypoleuca (E-SA)
- Sooty tyrannulet, Serpophaga nigricans (E-SA)
- White-crested tyrannulet, Serpophaga subcristata (E-SA)
- Straneck's tyrannulet, Serpophaga griseicapilla (E-SA)
- Agile tit-tyrant, Uromyias agilis (E-SA)
- Unstreaked tit-tyrant, Uromyias agraphia (E-PE)
- Short-tailed field tyrant, Muscigralla brevicauda (E-SA)
- Rufous-tailed attila, Attila phoenicurus (E-SA)
- Cinnamon attila, Attila cinnamomeus (E-SA)
- Ochraceous attila, Attila torridus (E-SA)
- Citron-bellied attila, Attila citriniventris (E-SA)
- Dull-capped attila, Attila bolivianus (E-SA)
- Gray-hooded attila, Attila rufus (E-BR)
- Bright-rumped attila, Attila spadiceus
- Piratic flycatcher, Legatus leucophaius
- Large-headed flatbill, Ramphotrigon megacephalum (E-SA)
- Rufous-tailed flatbill, Ramphotrigon ruficauda (E-SA)
- Dusky-tailed flatbill, Ramphotrigon fuscicauda (E-SA)
- Great kiskadee, Pitangus sulphuratus
- Lesser kiskadee, Philohydor lictor
- Cattle tyrant, Machetornis rixosa (E-SA)
- Sulphury flycatcher, Tyrannopsis sulphurea (E-SA)
- Boat-billed flycatcher, Megarynchus pitangua
- Golden-bellied flycatcher, Myiodynastes hemichrysus
- Golden-crowned flycatcher, Myiodynastes chrysocephalus
- Baird's flycatcher, Myiodynastes bairdii (E-SA)
- Sulphur-bellied flycatcher, Myiodynastes luteiventris
- Streaked flycatcher, Myiodynastes maculatus
- Rusty-margined flycatcher, Myiozetetes cayanensis
- Social flycatcher, Myiozetetes similis
- Gray-capped flycatcher, Myiozetetes granadensis
- Dusky-chested flycatcher, Myiozetetes luteiventris (E-SA)
- White-ringed flycatcher, Conopias albovittatus
- Yellow-throated flycatcher, Conopias parvus (E-SA)
- Three-striped flycatcher, Conopias trivirgatus (E-SA)
- Lemon-browed flycatcher, Conopias cinchoneti (E-SA)
- White-bearded flycatcher, Phelpsia inornata (E-SA)
- Variegated flycatcher, Empidonomus varius (E-SA)
- Crowned slaty flycatcher, Empidonomus aurantioatrocristatus (E-SA)
- Snowy-throated kingbird, Tyrannus niveigularis (E-SA)
- White-throated kingbird, Tyrannus albogularis (E-SA)
- Tropical kingbird, Tyrannus melancholicus
- Scissor-tailed flycatcher, Tyrannus forficatus (V)
- Fork-tailed flycatcher, Tyrannus savana (All)
- Eastern kingbird, Tyrannus tyrannus
- Gray kingbird, Tyrannus dominicensis
- Rufous mourner, Rhytipterna holerythra
- Grayish mourner, Rhytipterna simplex (E-SA)
- Pale-bellied mourner, Rhytipterna immunda (E-SA)
- Rufous casiornis, Casiornis rufus (E-SA)
- Ash-throated casiornis, Casiornis fuscus (E-BR)
- Choco sirystes, Sirystes albogriseus
- White-rumped sirystes, Sirystes albocinereus (E-SA)
- Todd's sirystes, Sirystes subcanescens (E-SA)
- Sibilant sirystes, Sirystes sibilator (E-SA)
- Rufous flycatcher, Myiarchus semirufus (E-PE)
- Dusky-capped flycatcher, Myiarchus tuberculifer
- Swainson's flycatcher, Myiarchus swainsoni (E-SA)
- Venezuelan flycatcher, Myiarchus venezuelensis (E-SA)
- Panama flycatcher, Myiarchus panamensis
- Short-crested flycatcher, Myiarchus ferox (E-SA)
- Apical flycatcher, Myiarchus apicalis (E-CO)
- Sooty-crowned flycatcher, Myiarchus phaeocephalus (E-SA)
- Pale-edged flycatcher, Myiarchus cephalotes (E-SA)
- Great crested flycatcher, Myiarchus crinitus
- Brown-crested flycatcher, Myiarchus tyrannulus
- Galapagos flycatcher, Myiarchus magnirostris (E-GA)
- Long-tailed tyrant, Colonia colonus
- Flavescent flycatcher, Myiophobus flavicans (E-SA)
- Orange-crested flycatcher, Myiophobus phoenicomitra (E-SA)
- Unadorned flycatcher, Myiophobus inornatus (E-SA)
- Roraiman flycatcher, Myiophobus roraimae (E-SA)
- Olive-chested flycatcher, Myiophobus cryptoxanthus (E-SA)
- Bran-colored flycatcher, Myiophobus fasciatus
- Mouse-gray flycatcher, Myiophobus crypterythrus (E-SA)
- Rufescent flycatcher, Myiophobus rufescens (E-SA)
- Patagonian tyrant, Colorhamphus parvirostris (E-SA)
- Crowned chat-tyrant, Silvicultrix frontalis (E-SA)
- Jelski's chat-tyrant, Silvicultrix jelskii (E-SA)
- Golden-browed chat-tyrant, Silvicultrix pulchella (E-SA)
- Yellow-bellied chat-tyrant, Silvicultrix diadema (E-SA)
- Slaty-backed chat-tyrant, Ochthoeca cinnamomeiventris (E-SA)
- Rufous-breasted chat-tyrant, Ochthoeca rufipectoralis (E-SA)
- Brown-backed chat-tyrant, Ochthoeca fumicolor (E-SA)
- d'Orbigny's chat-tyrant, Ochthoeca oenanthoides (E-SA)
- Piura chat-tyrant, Ochthoeca piurae (E-PE)
- White-browed chat-tyrant, Ochthoeca leucophrys (E-SA)
- Tumbes tyrant, Tumbezia salvini (E-SA)
- Chapada flycatcher, Guyramemua affine (E-SA)
- Northern scrub-flycatcher, Sublegatus arenarum
- Amazonian scrub-flycatcher, Sublegatus obscurior (E-SA)
- Southern scrub-flycatcher, Sublegatus modestus (E-SA)
- Vermilion flycatcher, Pyrocephalus rubinus
- Brujo flycatcher, Pyrocephalus nanus (E-GA)
- Pied water-tyrant, Fluvicola pica
- Black-backed water tyrant, Fluvicola albiventer (E-SA)
- Masked water tyrant, Fluvicola nengeta (E-SA)
- White-headed marsh tyrant, Arundinicola leucocephala (E-SA)
- Streamer-tailed tyrant, Gubernetes yetapa (E-SA)
- Black-and-white monjita, Heteroxolmis dominicana (E-SA)
- Cock-tailed tyrant, Alectrurus tricolor (E-SA)
- Strange-tailed tyrant, Alectrurus risora (E-SA)
- Austral negrito, Lessonia rufa (E-SA)
- Andean negrito, Lessonia oreas (E-SA)
- Spectacled tyrant, Hymenops perspicillatus (E-SA)
- Riverside tyrant, Knipolegus orenocensis (E-SA)
- Rufous-tailed tyrant, Knipolegus poecilurus (E-SA)
- Amazonian black-tyrant, Knipolegus poecilocercus (E-SA)
- Caatinga black-tyrant, Knipolegus franciscanus (E-BR)
- Crested black-tyrant, Knipolegus lophotes (E-SA)
- Velvety black-tyrant, Knipolegus nigerrimus (E-BR)
- Jelski's black-tyrant, Knipolegus signatus (E-SA)
- Plumbeous black-tyrant, Knipolegus cabanisi (E-SA)
- Blue-billed black-tyrant, Knipolegus cyanirostris (E-SA)
- Cinereous tyrant, Knipolegus striaticeps (E-SA)
- White-winged black-tyrant, Knipolegus aterrimus (E-SA)
- Hudson's black-tyrant, Knipolegus hudsoni (E-SA)
- Yellow-browed tyrant, Satrapa icterophrys (E-SA)
- Little ground-tyrant, Muscisaxicola fluviatilis (E-SA)
- Spot-billed ground-tyrant, Muscisaxicola maculirostris (E-SA)
- Taczanowski's ground-tyrant, Muscisaxicola griseus (E-SA)
- Puna ground-tyrant, Muscisaxicola juninensis (E-SA)
- Cinereous ground-tyrant, Muscisaxicola cinereus (E-SA)
- White-fronted ground-tyrant, Muscisaxicola albifrons (E-SA)
- Ochre-naped ground-tyrant, Muscisaxicola flavinucha (E-SA)
- Rufous-naped ground-tyrant, Muscisaxicola rufivertex (E-SA)
- Dark-faced ground-tyrant, Muscisaxicola maclovianus (E-SA)
- White-browed ground-tyrant, Muscisaxicola albilora (E-SA)
- Plain-capped ground-tyrant, Muscisaxicola alpinus (E-SA)
- Cinnamon-bellied ground-tyrant, Muscisaxicola capistratus (E-SA)
- Black-fronted ground-tyrant, Muscisaxicola frontalis (E-SA)
- Red-rumped bush-tyrant, Cnemarchus erythropygius (E-SA)
- Rufous-webbed bush-tyrant, Cnemarchus rufipennis (E-SA)
- White-rumped monjita, Xolmis velatus (E-SA)
- White monjita, Xolmis irupero (E-SA)
- Fire-eyed diucon, Pyrope pyrope (E-SA)
- Gray monjita, Nengetus cinereus (E-SA)
- Black-crowned monjita, Neoxolmis coronatus (E-SA)
- Chocolate-vented tyrant, Neoxolmis rufiventris (E-SA)
- Salinas monjita, Neoxolmis salinarum (E-AR)
- Rusty-backed monjita, Neoxolmis rubetra (E-AR)
- Black-billed shrike-tyrant, Agriornis montanus (E-SA)
- White-tailed shrike-tyrant, Agriornis albicauda (E-SA)
- Great shrike-tyrant, Agriornis lividus (E-SA)
- Gray-bellied shrike-tyrant, Agriornis micropterus (E-SA)
- Lesser shrike-tyrant, Agriornis murinus (E-SA)
- Streak-throated bush-tyrant, Myiotheretes striaticollis (E-SA)
- Santa Marta bush-tyrant, Myiotheretes pernix (E-CO)
- Smoky bush-tyrant, Myiotheretes fumigatus (E-SA)
- Rufous-bellied bush-tyrant, Myiotheretes fuscorufus (E-SA)
- Drab water tyrant, Ochthornis littoralis (E-SA)
- Fuscous flycatcher, Cnemotriccus fuscatus (E-SA)
- Black-billed flycatcher, Aphanotriccus audax
- Euler's flycatcher, Lathrotriccus euleri (E-SA)
- Gray-breasted flycatcher, Lathrotriccus griseipectus (E-SA)
- Tufted flycatcher, Mitrephanes phaeocercus
- Olive flycatcher, Mitrephanes olivaceus (E-SA)
- Black phoebe, Sayornis nigricans
- Acadian flycatcher, Empidonax virescens
- Willow flycatcher, Empidonax traillii
- Alder flycatcher, Empidonax alnorum
- Olive-sided flycatcher, Contopus cooperi
- Smoke-colored pewee, Contopus fumigatus (E-SA)
- Western wood-pewee, Contopus sordidulus
- Eastern wood-pewee, Contopus virens
- Tropical pewee, Contopus cinereus
- White-throated pewee, Contopus albogularis (E-SA)
- Blackish pewee, Contopus nigrescens (E-SA)
- Shear-tailed gray tyrant, Muscipipra vetula (E-SA)
- Many-colored rush tyrant, Tachuris rubrigastra (E-SA)

== Vireos ==
Order: Passeriformes Family: Vireonidae

The vireos are a group of small to medium-sized passerine birds. They are typically greenish in color and resemble wood warblers apart from their heavier bills.

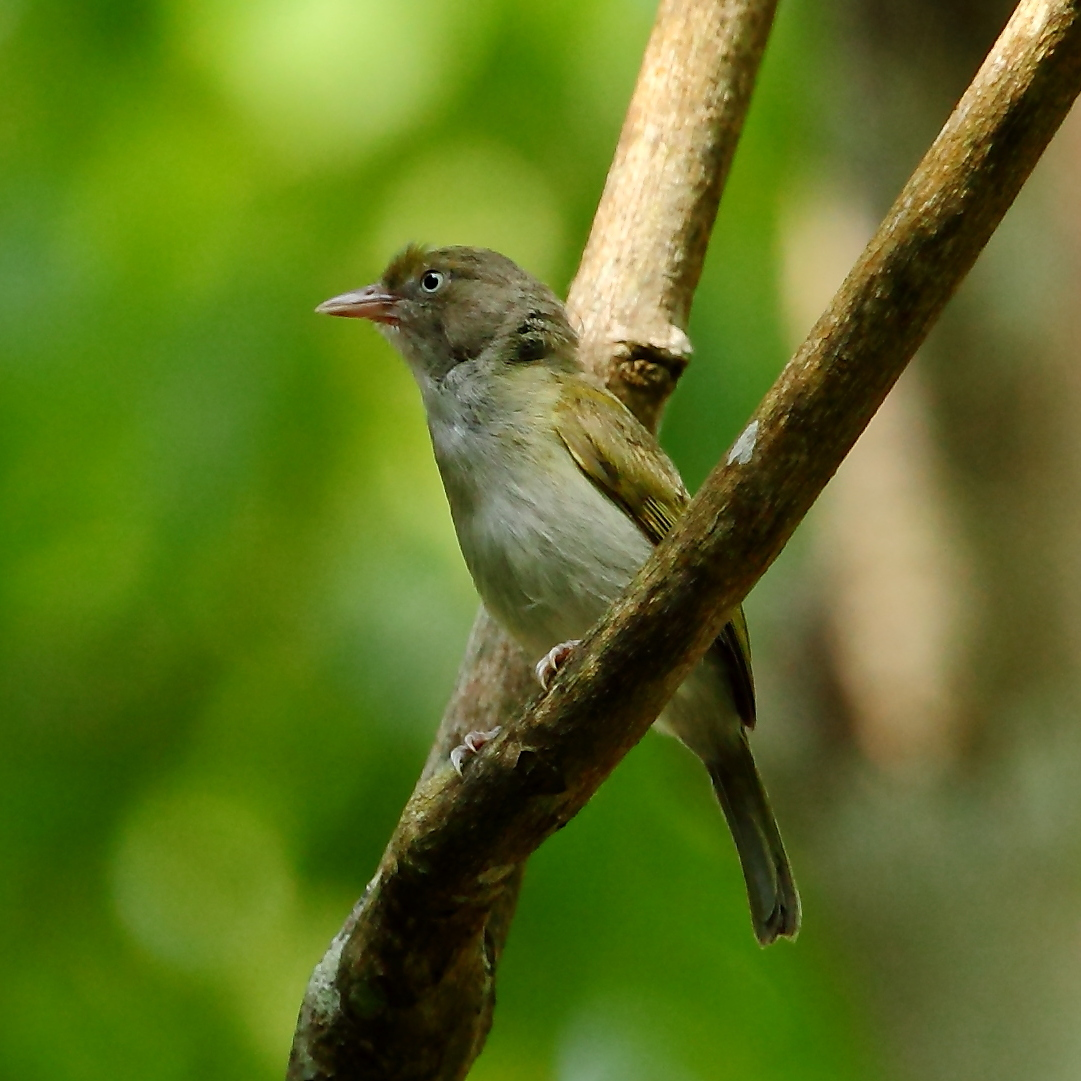
Gray-chested greenlet

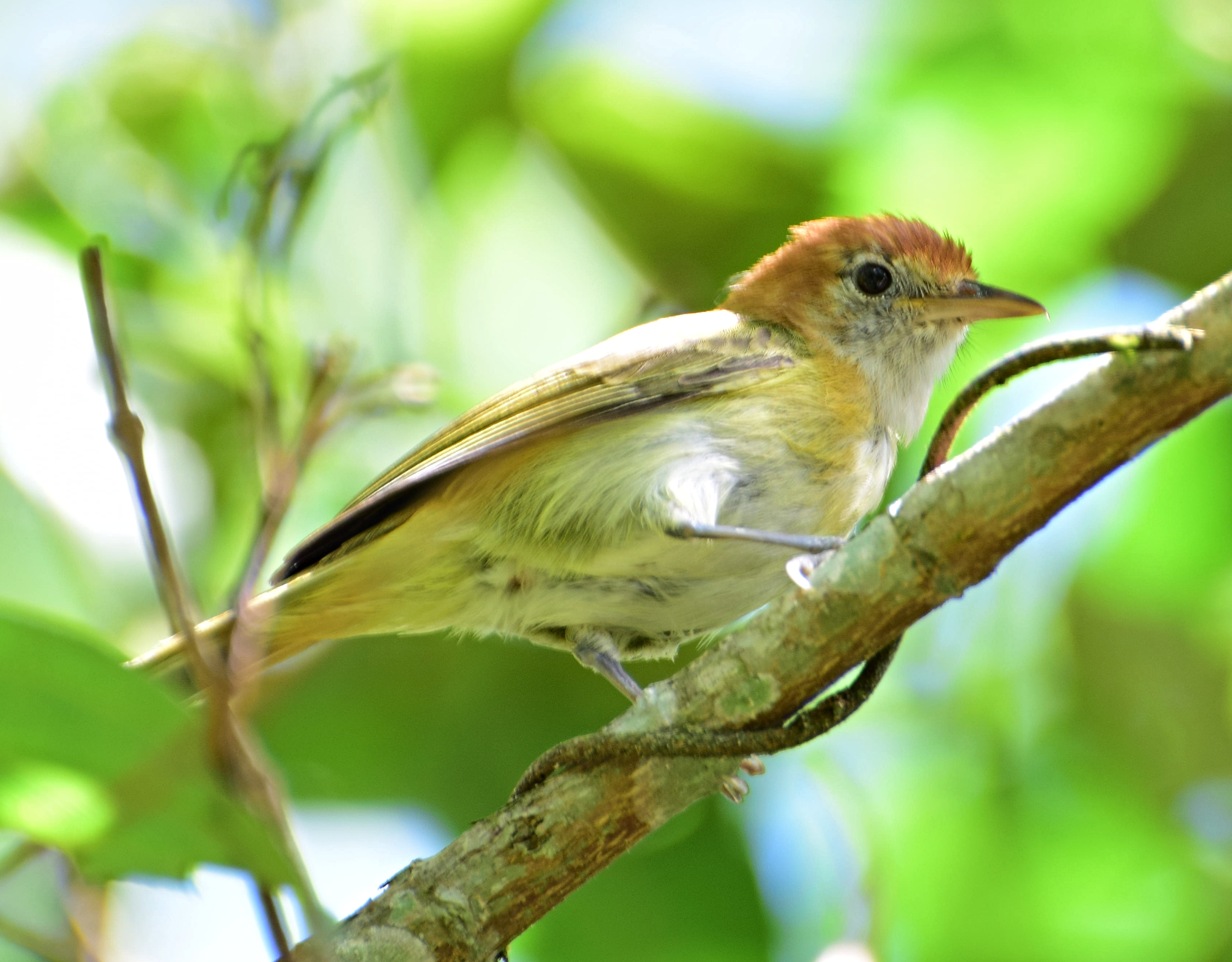
Rufous-naped greenlet

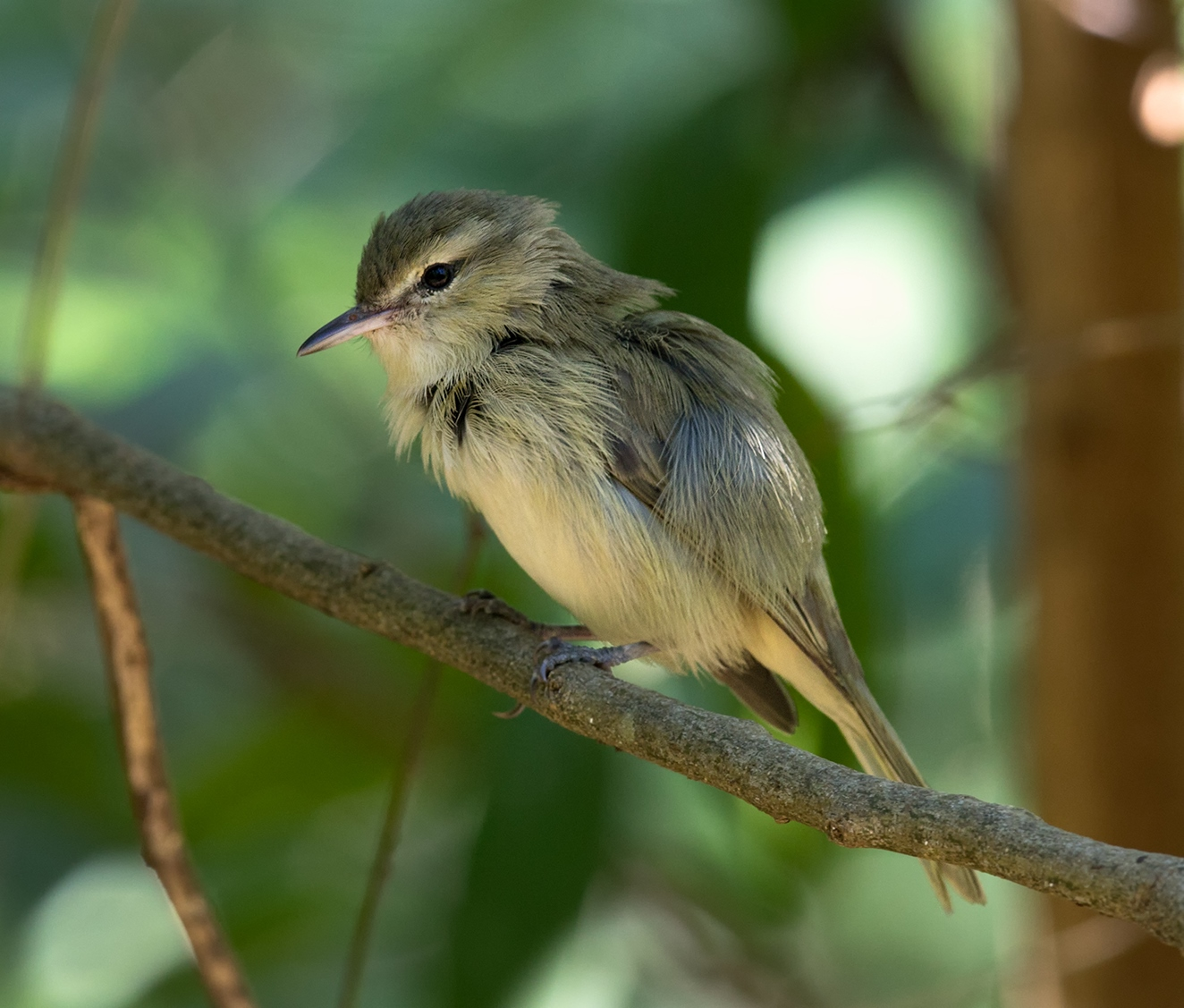
Noronha vireo
- Rufous-browed peppershrike, Cyclarhis gujanensis
- Black-billed peppershrike, Cyclarhis nigrirostris (E-SA)
- Gray-eyed greenlet, Hylophilus amaurocephalus (E-BR)
- Rufous-crowned greenlet, Hylophilus poicilotis (E-SA)
- Olivaceous greenlet, Hylophilus olivaceus (E-SA)
- Ashy-headed greenlet, Hylophilus pectoralis (E-SA)
- Scrub greenlet, Hylophilus flavipes
- Gray-chested greenlet, Hylophilus semicinereus (E-SA)
- Brown-headed greenlet, Hylophilus brunneiceps (E-SA)
- Lemon-chested greenlet, Hylophilus thoracicus (E-SA)
- Yellow-browed shrike-vireo, Vireolanius eximius
- Slaty-capped shrike-vireo, Vireolanius leucotis (E-SA)
- Ochre-crowned brownlet, Tunchiornis ochraceiceps
- Rufous-fronted brownlet, Tunchiornis ferrugineifrons (E-SA)
- Guianan brownlet, Tunchiornis luteifrons (E-SA)
- Para brownlet, Tunchiornis rubrifrons (E-BR)
- Lesser greenlet, Pachysylvia decurtata
- Dusky-capped greenlet, Pachysylvia hypoxantha (E-SA)
- Buff-cheeked greenlet, Pachysylvia muscicapina (E-SA)
- Golden-fronted greenlet, Pachysylvia aurantiifrons
- Rufous-naped greenlet, Pachysylvia semibrunnea (E-SA)
- White-eyed vireo, Vireo griseus
- Yellow-throated vireo, Vireo flavifrons
- Choco vireo, Vireo masteri (E-SA)
- Tepui vireo, Vireo sclateri (E-SA)
- Philadelphia vireo, Vireo philadelphicus (V)
- Brown-capped vireo, Vireo leucophrys
- Red-eyed vireo, Vireo olivaceus
- Chivi vireo, Vireo chivi
- Noronha vireo, Vireo gracilirostris (E-BR)
- Yellow-green vireo, Vireo flavoviridis
- Black-whiskered vireo, Vireo altiloquus

== Jays ==
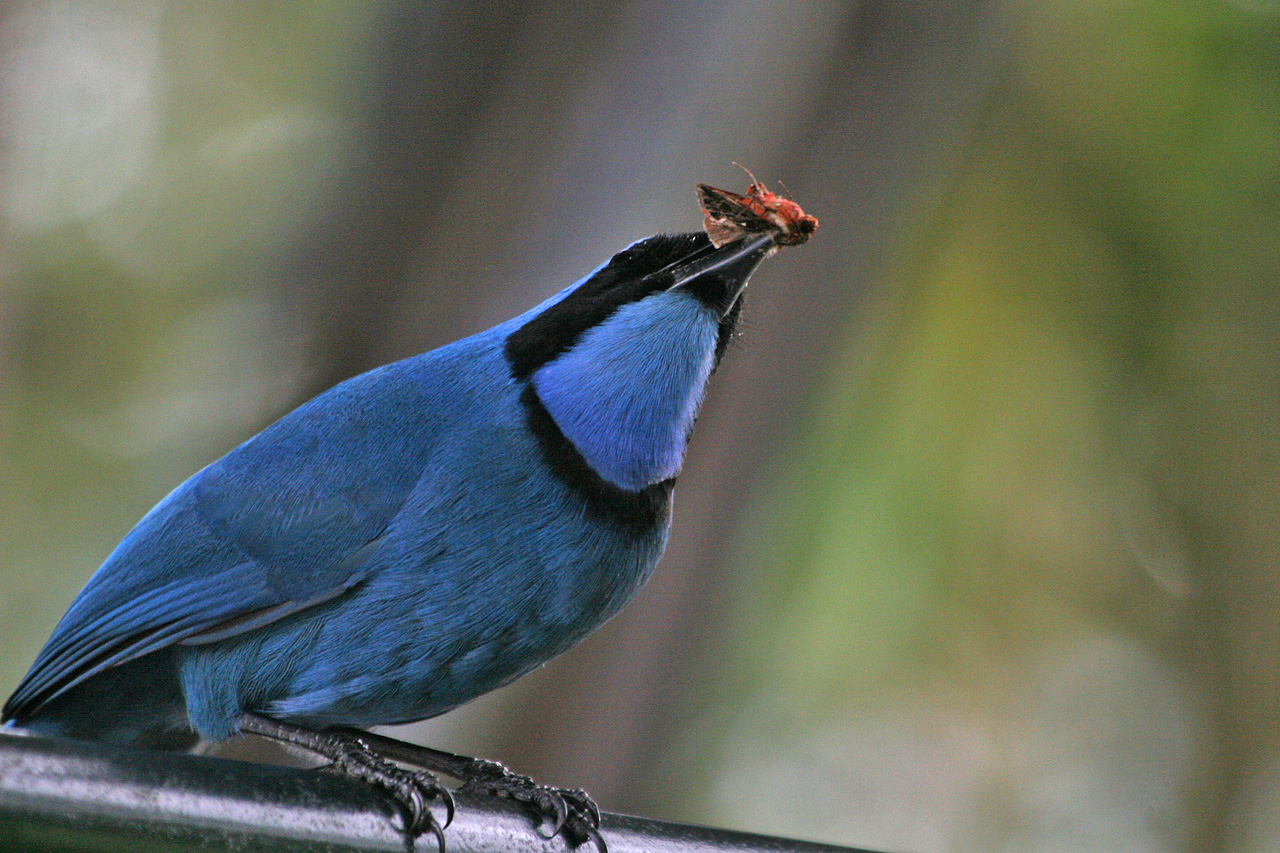
Turquoise jay

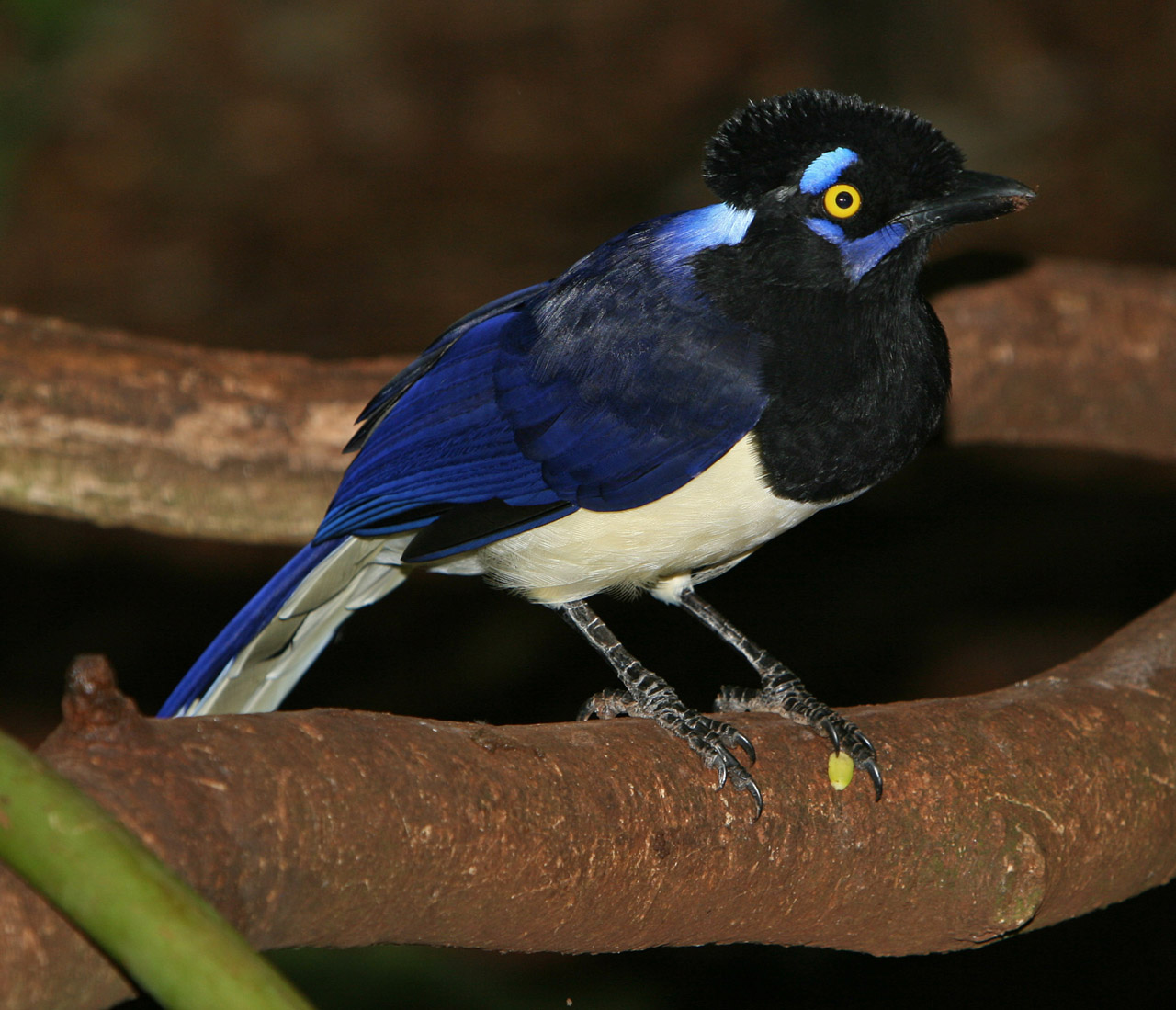
Plush-crested jay

Order: Passeriformes Family: Corvidae

The family Corvidae includes crows, ravens, jays, choughs, magpies, treepies, nutcrackers, and ground jays. Corvids are above average in size among the Passeriformes, and some of the larger species show high levels of intelligence.

- Black-collared jay, Cyanolyca armillata (E-SA)
- White-collared jay, Cyanolyca viridicyanus (E-SA)
- Turquoise jay, Cyanolyca turcosa (E-SA)
- Beautiful jay, Cyanolyca pulchra (E-SA)
- Violaceous jay, Cyanocorax violaceus (E-SA)
- Purplish jay, Cyanocorax cyanomelas (E-SA)
- Azure jay, Cyanocorax caeruleus (E-SA)
- Curl-crested jay, Cyanocorax cristatellus (E-SA)
- Black-chested jay, Cyanocorax affinis
- White-tailed jay, Cyanocorax mystacalis (E-SA)
- Cayenne jay, Cyanocorax cayanus (E-SA)
- Azure-naped jay, Cyanocorax heilprini (E-SA)
- Plush-crested jay, Cyanocorax chrysops (E-SA)
- White-naped jay, Cyanocorax cyanopogon (E-BR)
- Green jay, Cyanocorax yncas

== Larks ==
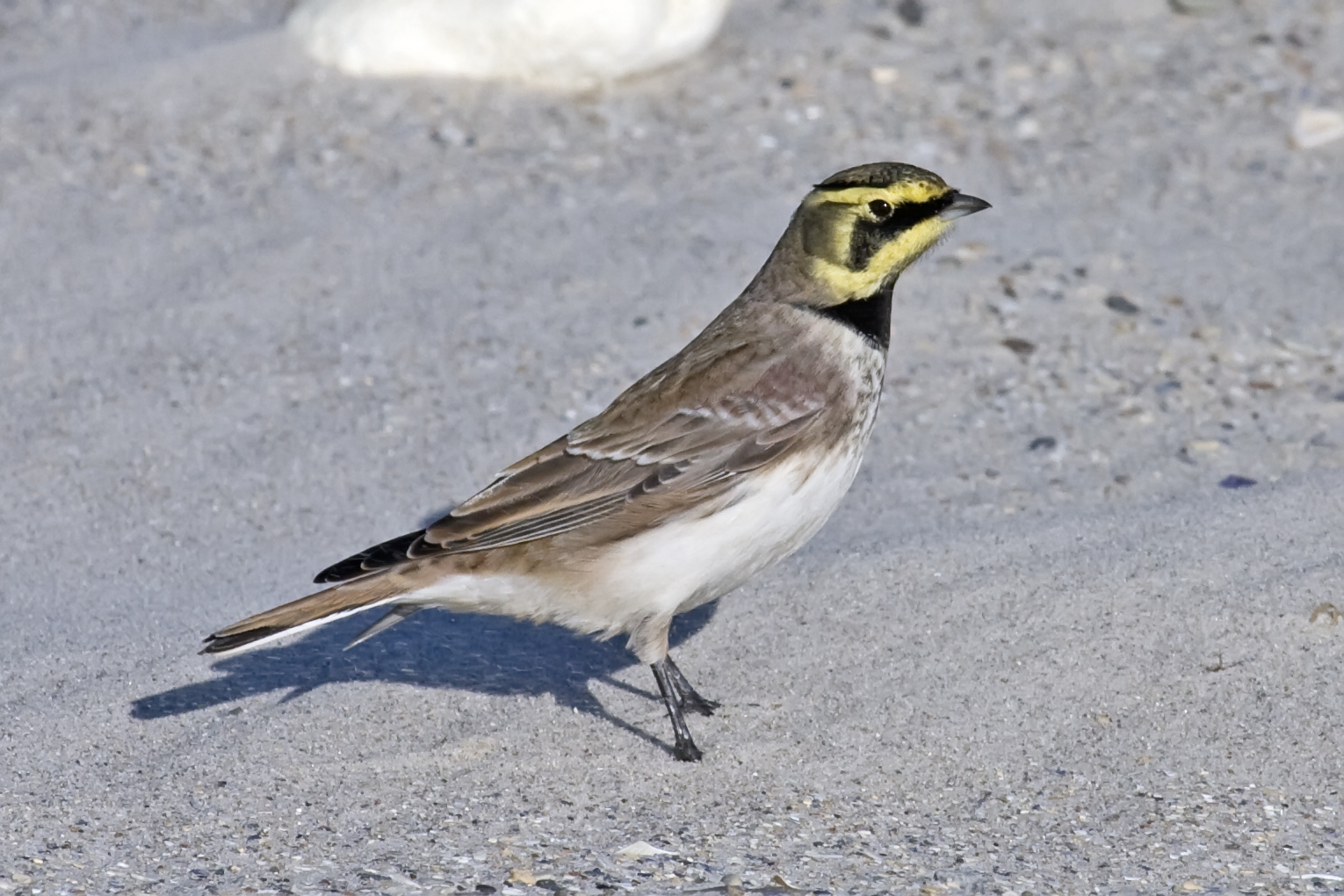
Horned lark

Order: Passeriformes Family: Alaudidae

Larks are small terrestrial birds with often extravagant songs and display flights. Most larks are fairly dull in appearance. Their food is insects and seeds.

- Horned lark, Eremophila alpestris

== Swallows ==
Order: Passeriformes Family: Hirundinidae

The family Hirundinidae is adapted to aerial feeding. They have a slender streamlined body, long pointed wings, and a short bill with a wide gape. The feet are adapted to perching rather than walking, and the front toes are partially joined at the base.

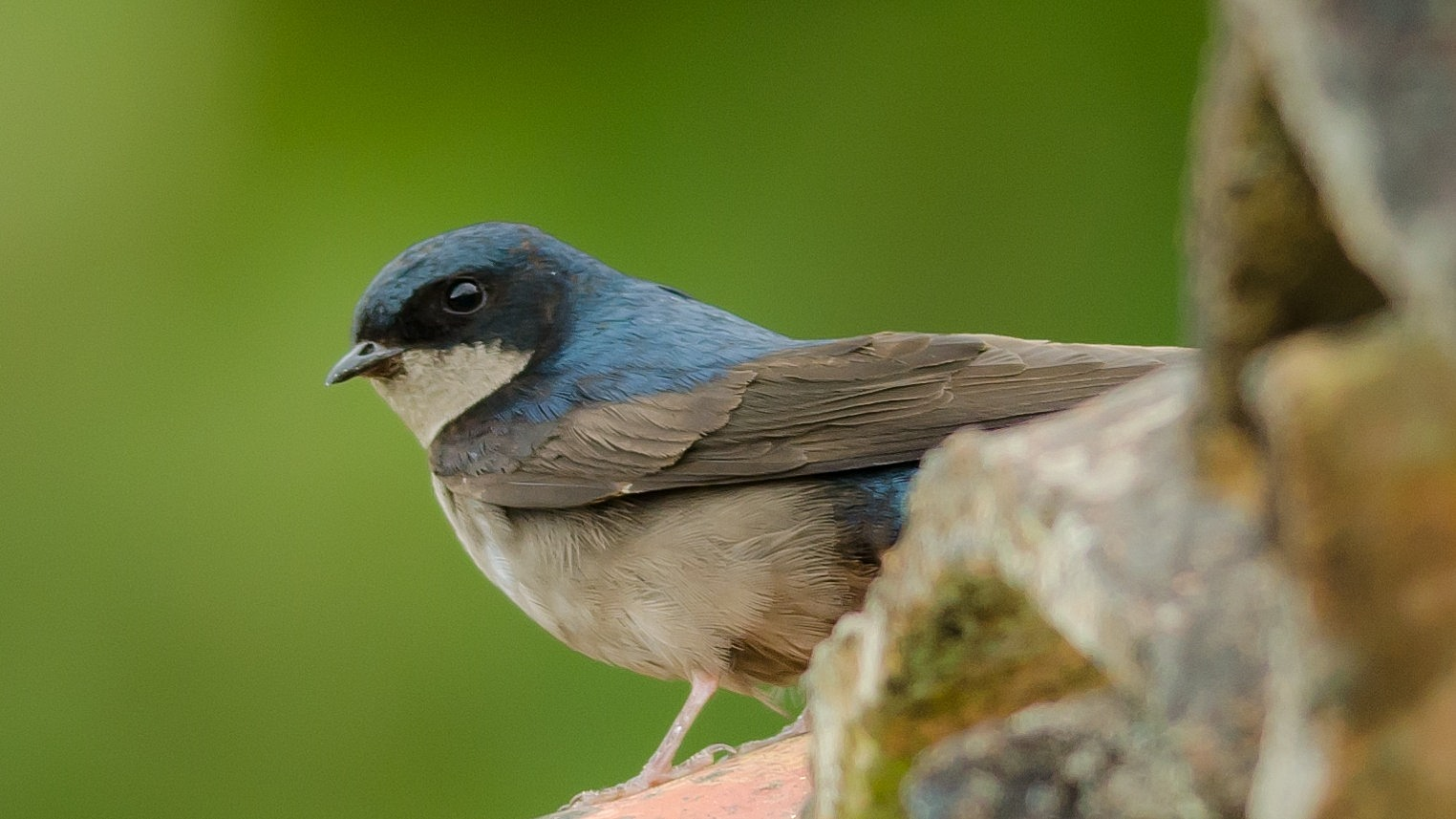
Brown-bellied swallow

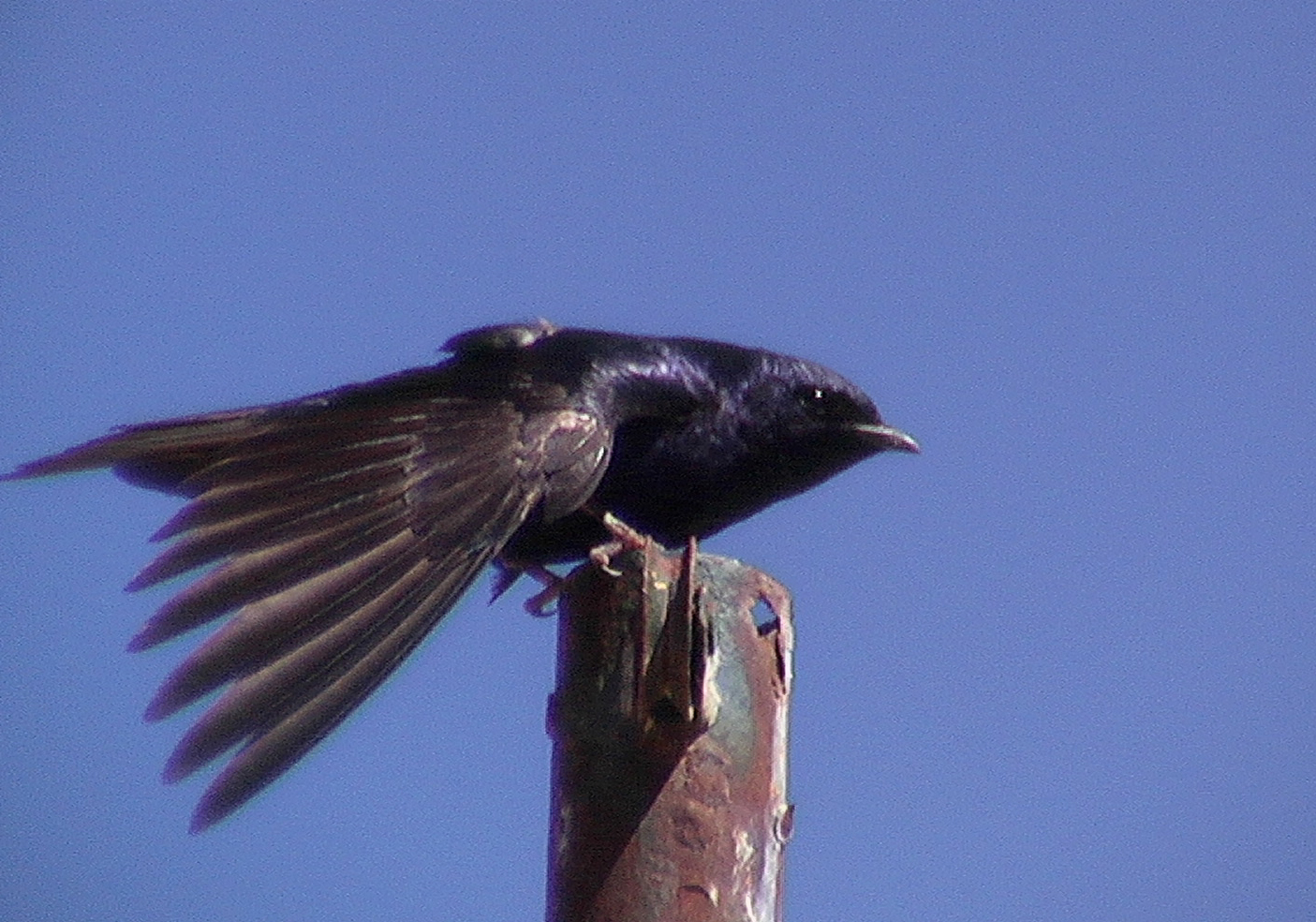
Southern martin

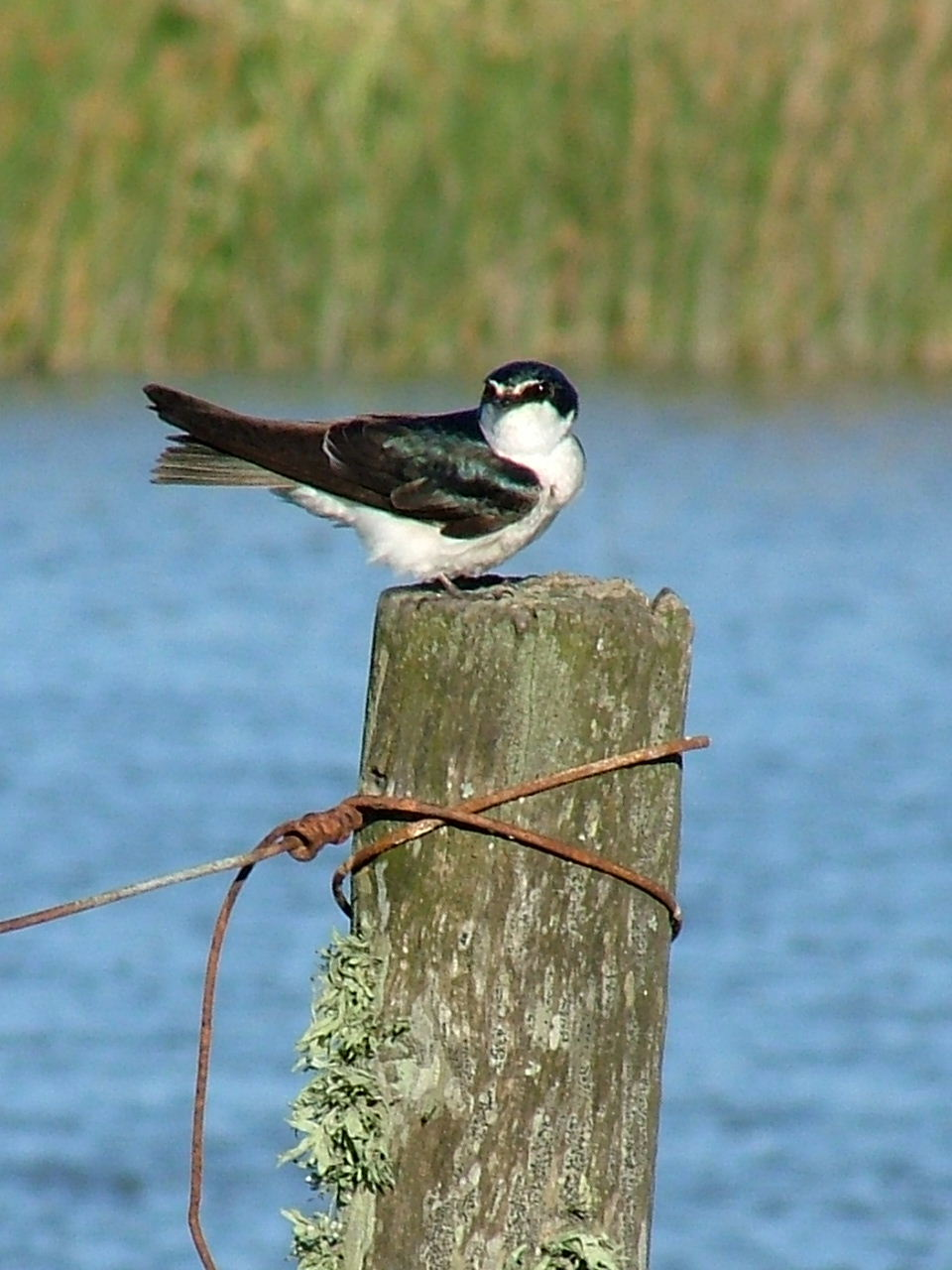
White-rumped swallow
- Blue-and-white swallow, Pygochelidon cyanoleuca
- Black-collared swallow, Pygochelidon melanoleuca (E-SA)
- Tawny-headed swallow, Alopochelidon fucata (E-SA)
- Brown-bellied swallow, Orochelidon murina (E-SA)
- Pale-footed swallow, Orochelidon flavipes (E-SA)
- Andean swallow, Orochelidon andecola (E-SA)
- White-banded swallow, Atticora fasciata (E-SA)
- White-thighed swallow, Atticora tibialis
- Southern rough-winged swallow, Stelgidopteryx ruficollis
- Brown-chested martin, Progne tapera
- Purple martin, Progne subis
- Caribbean martin, Progne dominicensis
- Cuban martin, Progne cryptoleuca (V)
- Gray-breasted martin, Progne chalybea
- Southern martin, Progne elegans (E-SA)
- Peruvian martin, Progne murphyi (E-SA)
- Galapagos martin, Progne modesta (E-GA)
- Tree swallow, Tachycineta bicolor
- Tumbes swallow, Tachycineta stolzmanni (E-SA)
- White-winged swallow, Tachycineta albiventer (E-SA)
- White-rumped swallow, Tachycineta leucorrhoa (E-SA)
- Chilean swallow, Tachycineta leucopyga (E-SA)
- Bank swallow, Riparia riparia
- Barn swallow, Hirundo rustica (All)
- Cliff swallow, Petrochelidon pyrrhonota
- Cave swallow, Petrochelidon fulva (V)
- Chestnut-collared swallow, Petrochelidon rufocollaris (E-SA)

== Wrens ==
Order: Passeriformes Family: Troglodytidae

Wrens are mainly small and inconspicuous except for their loud songs. These birds have short wings and thin down-turned bills. Several species often hold their tails upright. All are insectivorous.

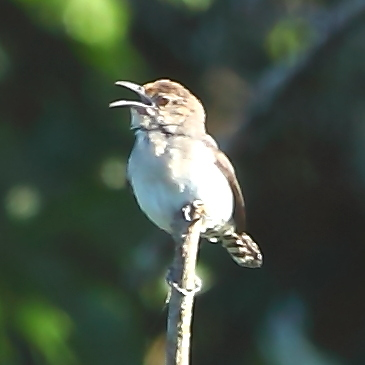
Tooth-billed wren

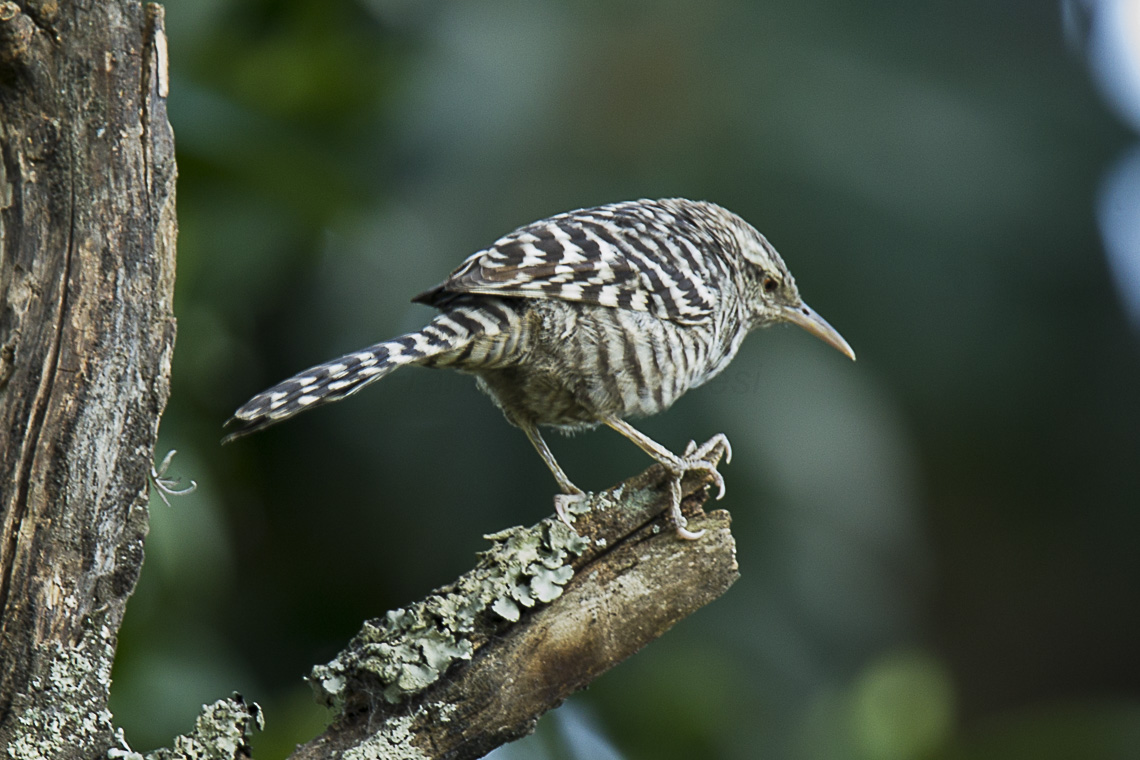
Fasciated wren

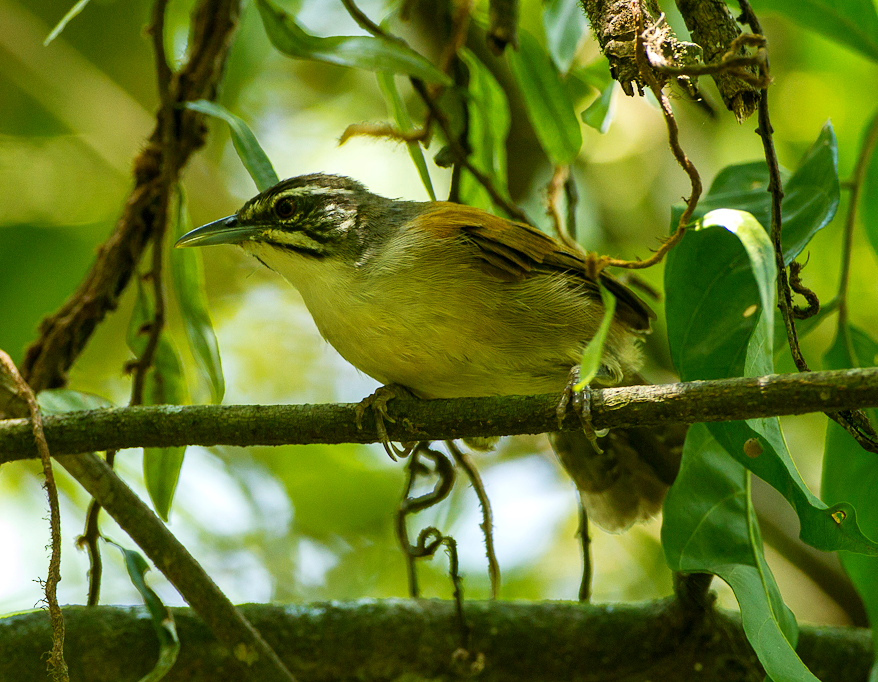
Moustached wren

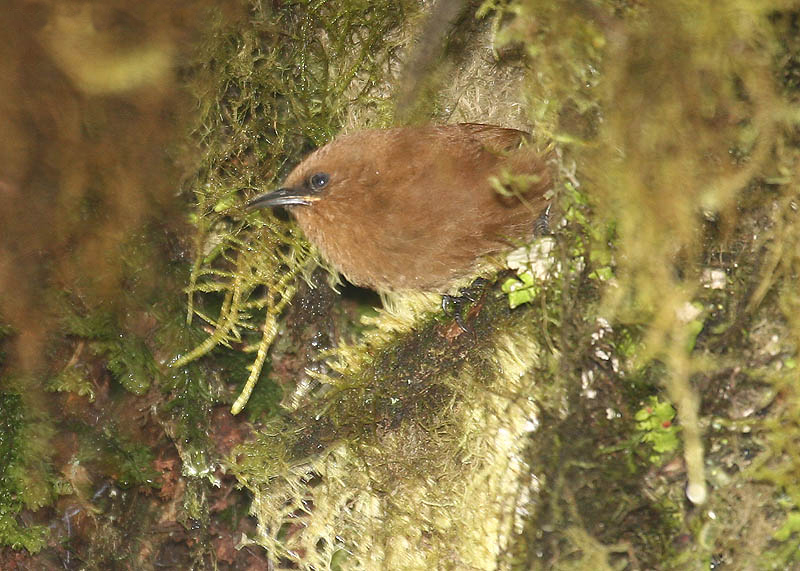
Rufous wren

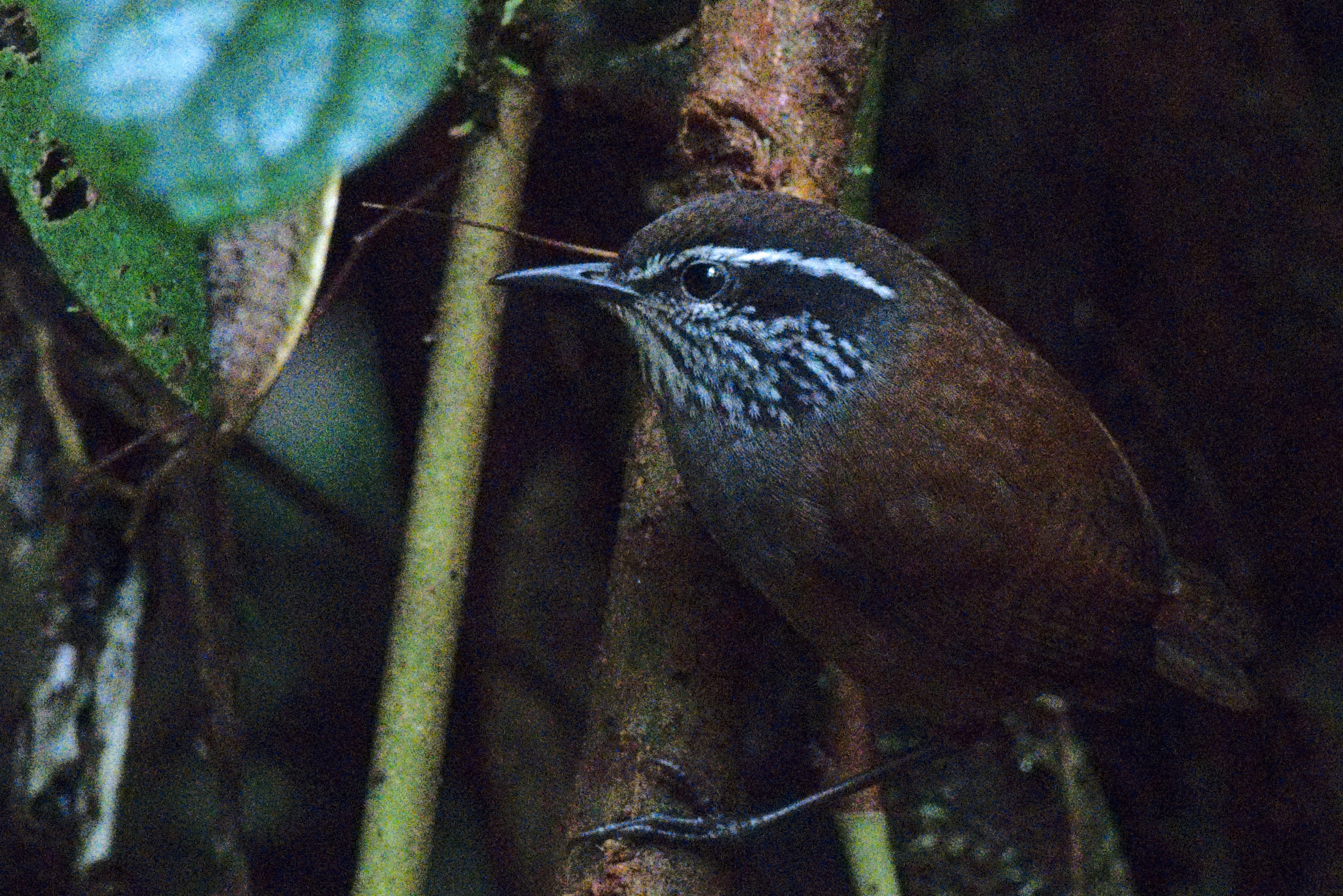
Munchique wood-wren
- Scaly-breasted wren, Microcerculus marginatus
- Flutist wren, Microcerculus ustulatus (E-SA)
- Wing-banded wren, Microcerculus bambla (E-SA)
- Gray-mantled wren, Odontorchilus branickii (E-SA)
- Tooth-billed wren, Odontorchilus cinereus (E-SA)
- Southern house-wren, Troglodytes musculus
- Cobb's wren, Troglodytes cobbi (E-FA)
- Ochraceous wren, Troglodytes ochraceus
- Mountain wren, Troglodytes solstitialis (E-SA)
- Santa Marta wren, Troglodytes monticola (E-CO)
- Tepui wren, Troglodytes rufulus (E-SA)
- Grass wren, Cistothorus platensis
- Merida wren, Cistothorus meridae (E-VE)
- Apolinar's wren, Cistothorus apolinari (E-CO)
- White-headed wren, Campylorhynchus albobrunneus
- Band-backed wren, Campylorhynchus zonatus
- Stripe-backed wren, Campylorhynchus nuchalis (E-SA)
- Fasciated wren, Campylorhynchus fasciatus (E-SA)
- Bicolored wren, Campylorhynchus griseus (E-SA)
- Thrush-like wren, Campylorhynchus turdinus (E-SA)
- Sooty-headed wren, Pheugopedius spadix
- Black-bellied wren, Pheugopedius fasciatoventris
- Plain-tailed wren, Pheugopedius euophrys (E-SA)
- Inca wren, Pheugopedius eisenmanni (E-PE)
- Whiskered wren, Pheugopedius mystacalis (E-SA)
- Moustached wren, Pheugopedius genibarbis (E-SA)
- Coraya wren, Pheugopedius coraya (E-SA)
- Rufous-breasted wren, Pheugopedius rutilus
- Speckle-breasted wren, Pheugopedius sclateri (E-SA)
- Rufous-and-white wren, Thryophilus rufalbus
- Antioquia wren, Thryophilus sernai (E-CO)
- Niceforo's wren, Thryophilus nicefori (E-CO)
- Stripe-throated wren, Cantorchilus leucopogon
- Bay wren, Cantorchilus nigricapillus
- Superciliated wren, Cantorchilus superciliaris (E-SA)
- Buff-breasted wren, Cantorchilus leucotis
- Long-billed wren, Cantorchilus longirostris (E-BR)
- Fawn-breasted wren, Cantorchilus guarayanus (E-SA)
- Gray wren, Cantorchilus griseus (E-BR)
- Rufous wren, Cinnycerthia unirufa (E-SA)
- Sharpe's wren, Cinnycerthia olivascens (E-SA)
- Peruvian wren, Cinnycerthia peruana (E-PE)
- Fulvous wren, Cinnycerthia fulva (E-SA)
- White-breasted wood-wren, Henicorhina leucosticta
- Bar-winged wood-wren, Henicorhina leucoptera (E-SA)
- Gray-breasted wood-wren, Henicorhina leucophrys
- Hermit wood-wren, Henicorhina anachoreta (E-CO)
- Munchique wood-wren, Henicorhina negreti (E-CO)
- Chestnut-breasted wren, Cyphorhinus thoracicus
- Song wren, Cyphorhinus phaeocephalus
- Musician wren, Cyphorhinus arada (E-SA)

== Gnatcatchers ==
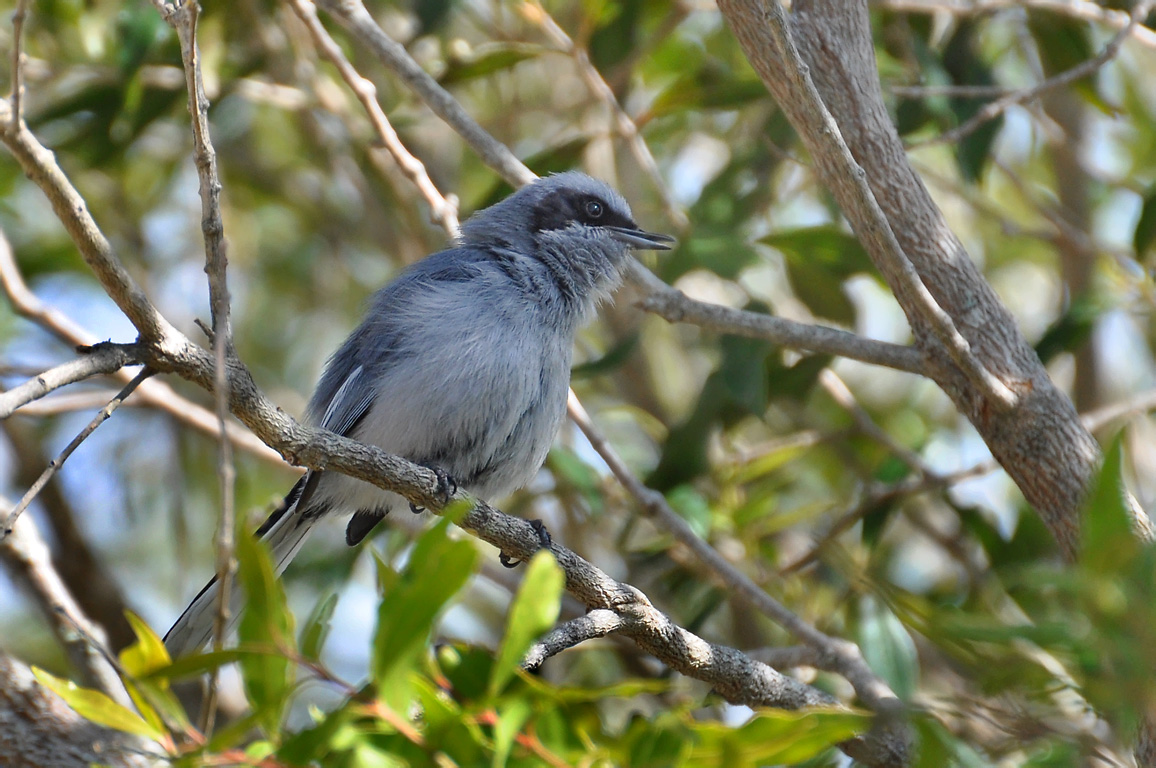
Masked gnatcatcher

Order: Passeriformes Family: Polioptilidae

These dainty birds resemble Old World warblers in their build and habits, moving restlessly through the foliage seeking insects. The gnatcatchers and gnatwrens are mainly soft bluish gray in color and have the typical insectivore's long sharp bill. They are birds of fairly open woodland or scrub, which nest in bushes or trees.

- Collared gnatwren, Microbates collaris (E-SA)
- Half-collared gnatwren, Microbates cinereiventris
- Trilling gnatwren, Ramphocaenus melanurus
- Chattering gnatwren, Ramphocaenus sticturus (E-SA)
- Tropical gnatcatcher, Polioptila plumbea
- Creamy-bellied gnatcatcher, Polioptila lactea (E-SA)
- Rio Negro gnatcatcher, Polioptila facilis (E-SA)
- Guianan gnatcatcher, Polioptila guianensis (E-SA)
- Iquitos gnatcatcher, Polioptila clementsi (E-PE)
- Klages's gnatcatcher, Polioptila paraensis (E-SA)
- Inambari gnatcatcher, Polioptila attenboroughi (E-BR)
- Slate-throated gnatcatcher, Polioptila schistaceigula
- Masked gnatcatcher, Polioptila dumicola (E-SA)

== Donacobius ==
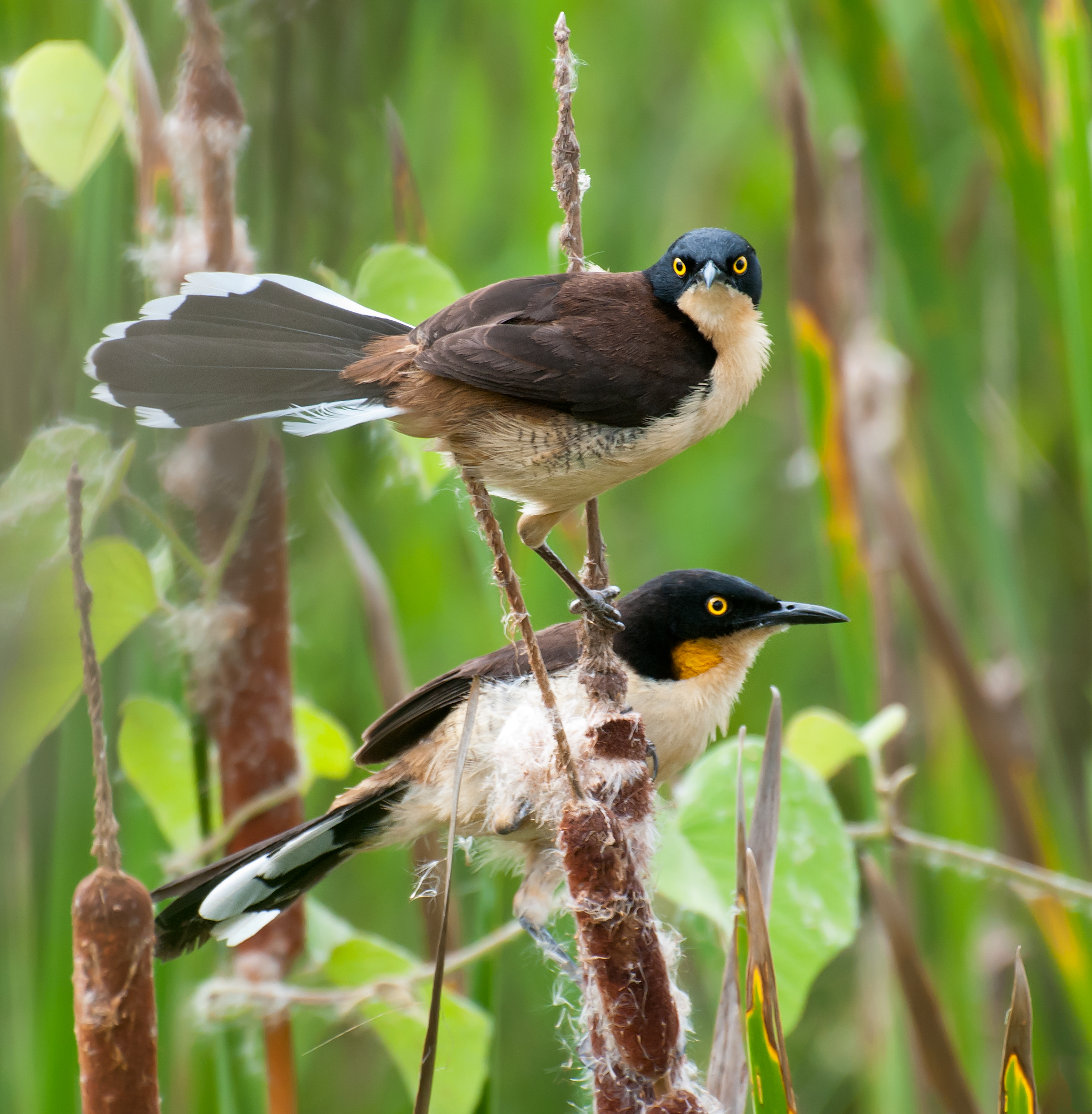
Black-capped donacobius

Order: Passeriformes Family: Donacobiidae

The black-capped donacobius is found in wet habitats from Panama across northern South America and east of the Andes to Argentina and Paraguay.

- Black-capped donacobius, Donacobius atricapilla

== Dippers ==
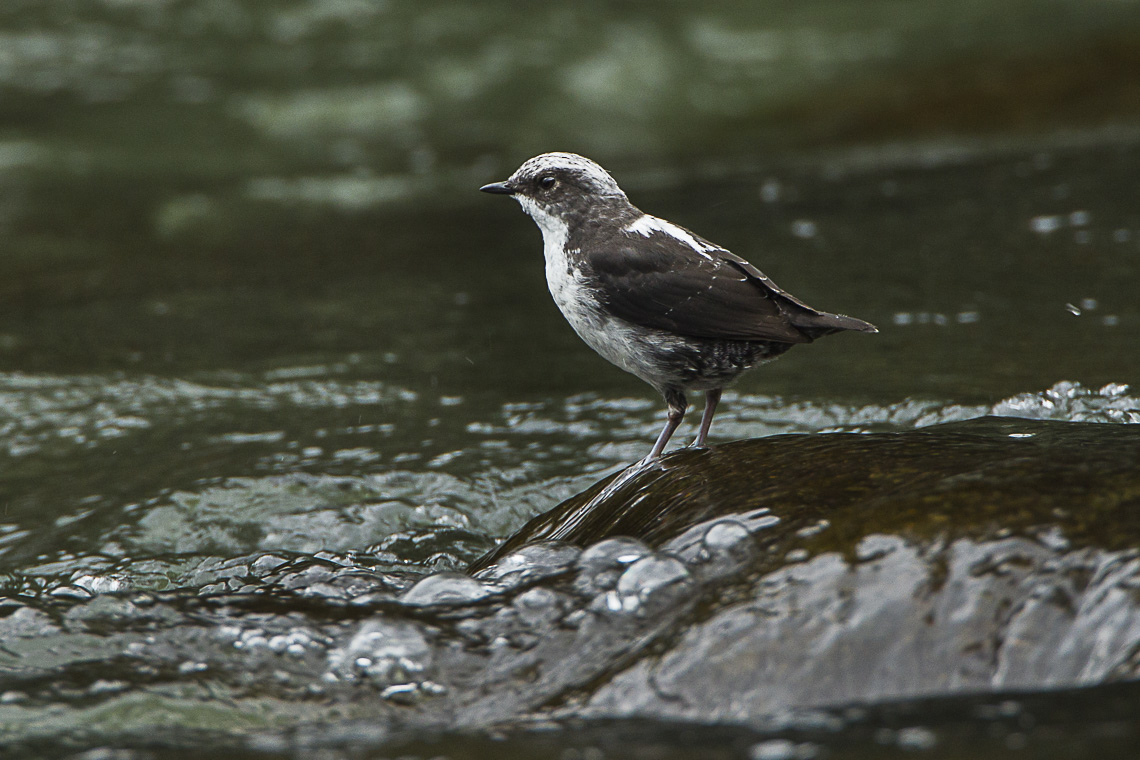
White-capped dipper

Order: Passeriformes Family: Cinclidae

Dippers are a group of perching birds whose habitat includes aquatic environments in the Americas, Europe, and Asia. They are named for their bobbing or dipping movements.

- White-capped dipper, Cinclus leucocephalus (E-SA)
- Rufous-throated dipper, Cinclus schulzii (E-SA)

== Waxwings ==
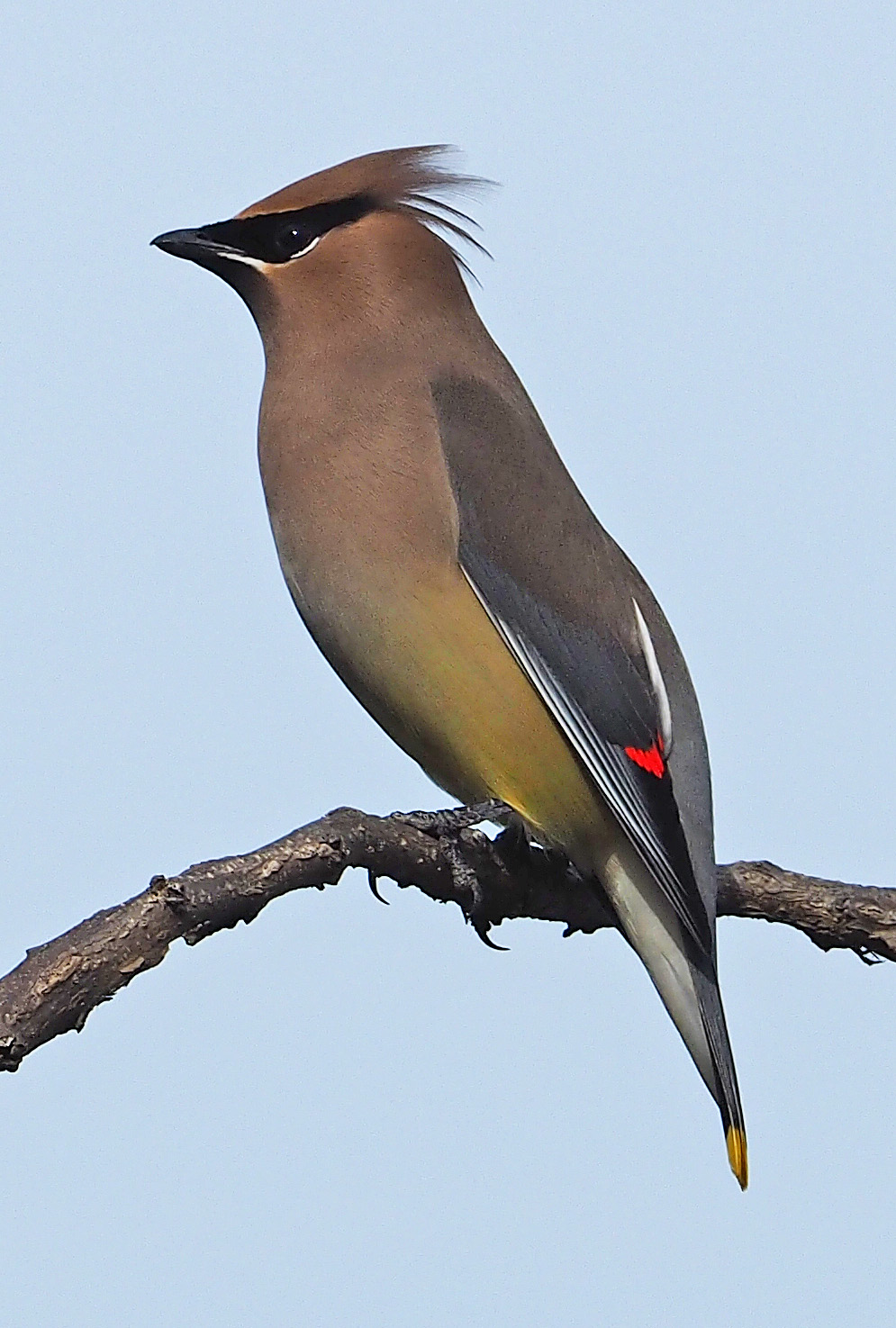
Cedar waxwing

Order: Passeriformes Family: Bombycillidae

The waxwings are a group of birds with soft silky plumage and unique red tips to some of the wing feathers. In the Bohemian and cedar waxwings, these tips look like sealing wax and give the group its name. These are arboreal birds of northern forests. They live on insects in summer and berries in winter.

- Cedar waxwing, Bombycilla cedrorum (V)

== Thrushes ==
Order: Passeriformes Family: Turdidae

The thrushes are a group of passerine birds that occur mainly in the Old World. They are plump, soft plumaged, small to medium-sized insectivores or sometimes omnivores, often feeding on the ground. Many have attractive songs.

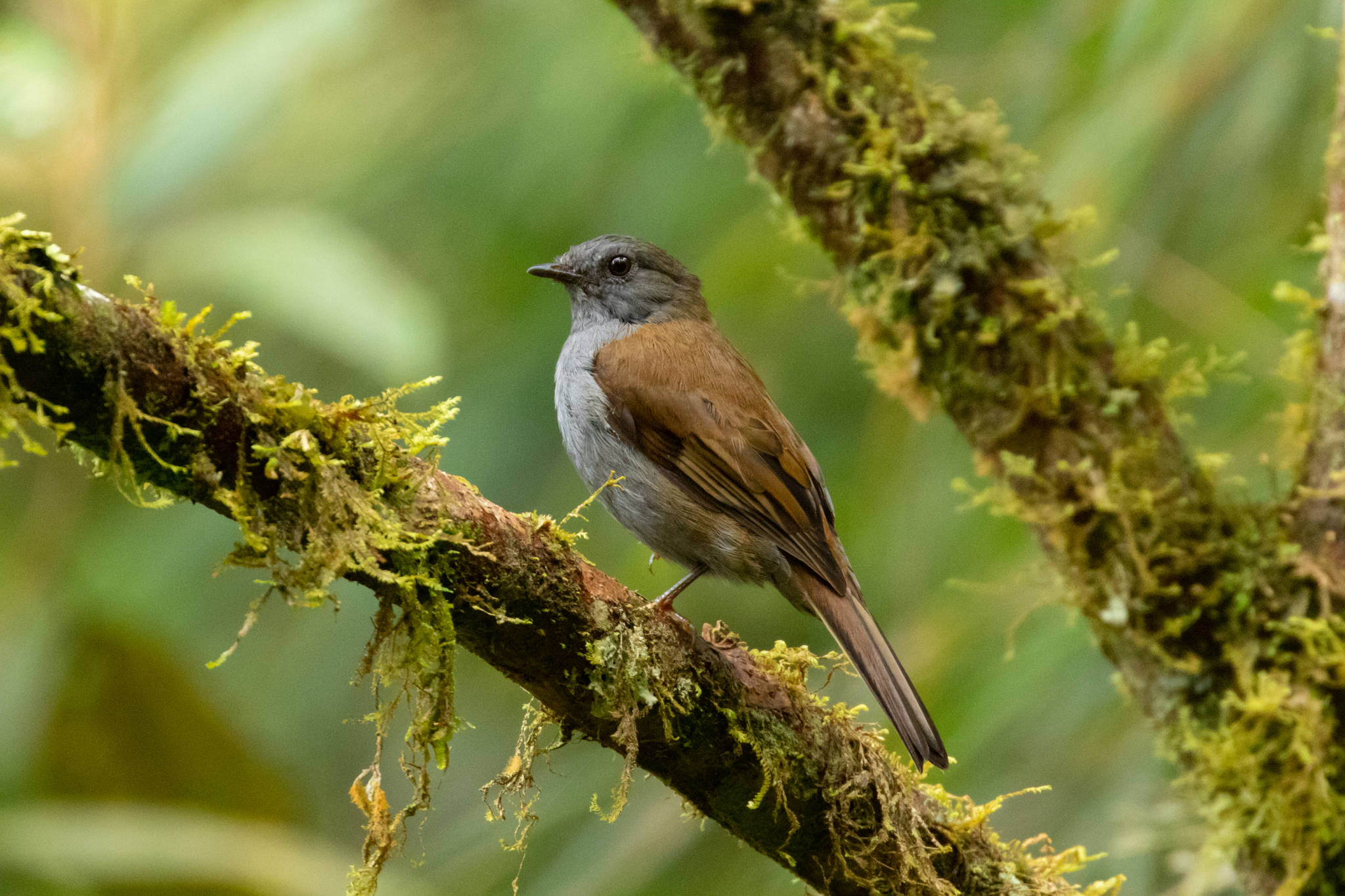
Andean solitaire

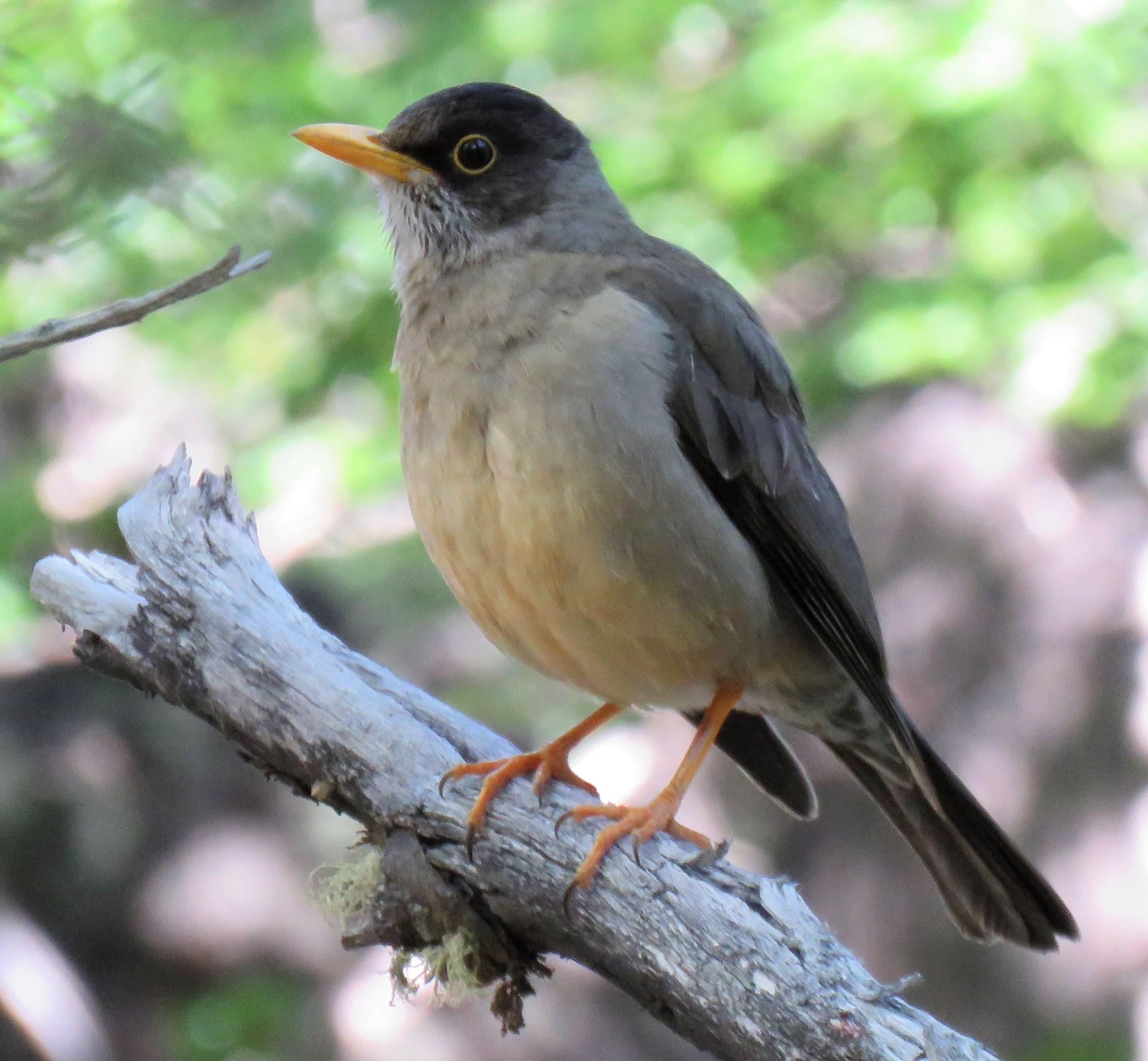
Austral thrush

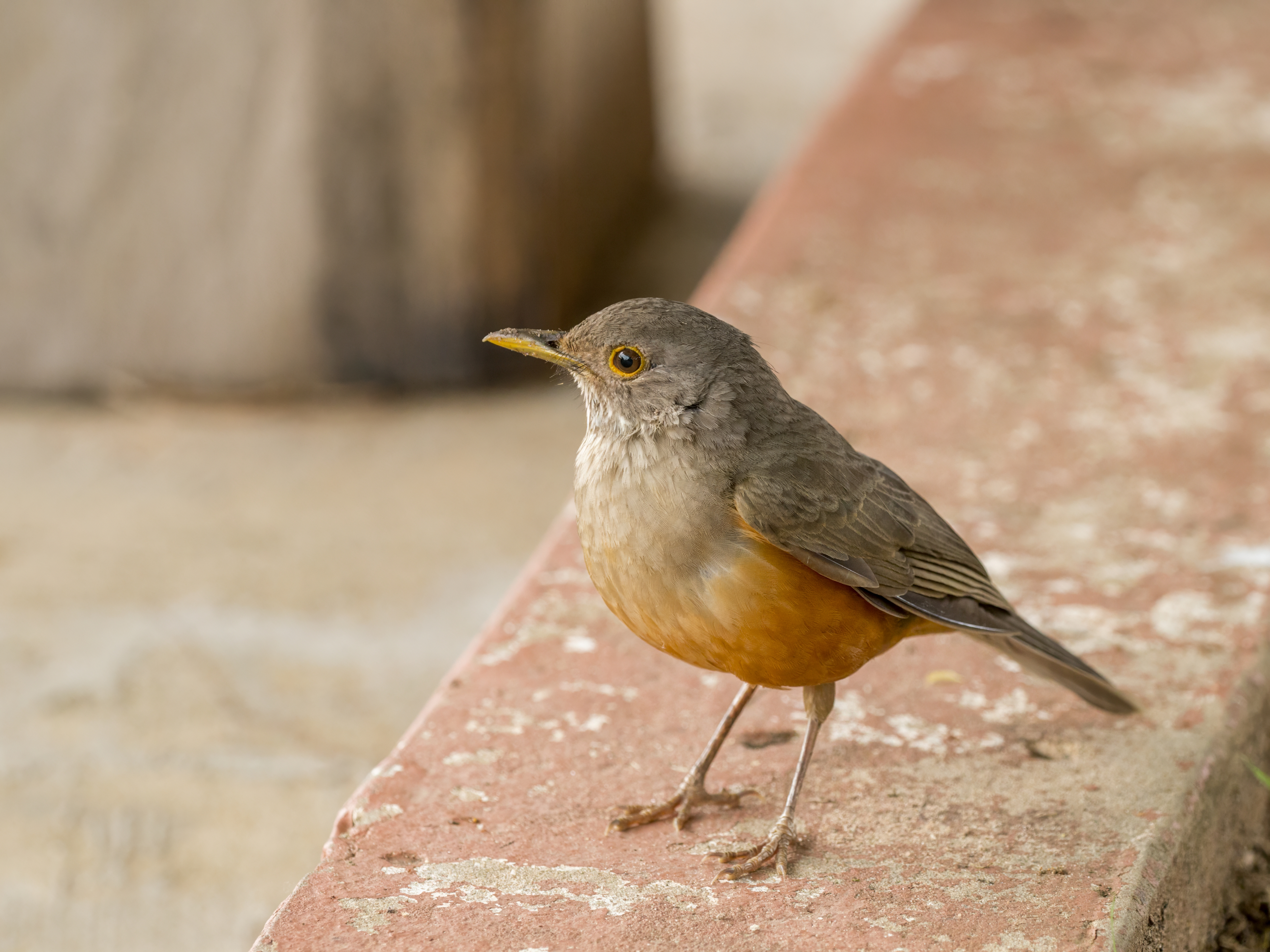
Rufous-bellied thrush

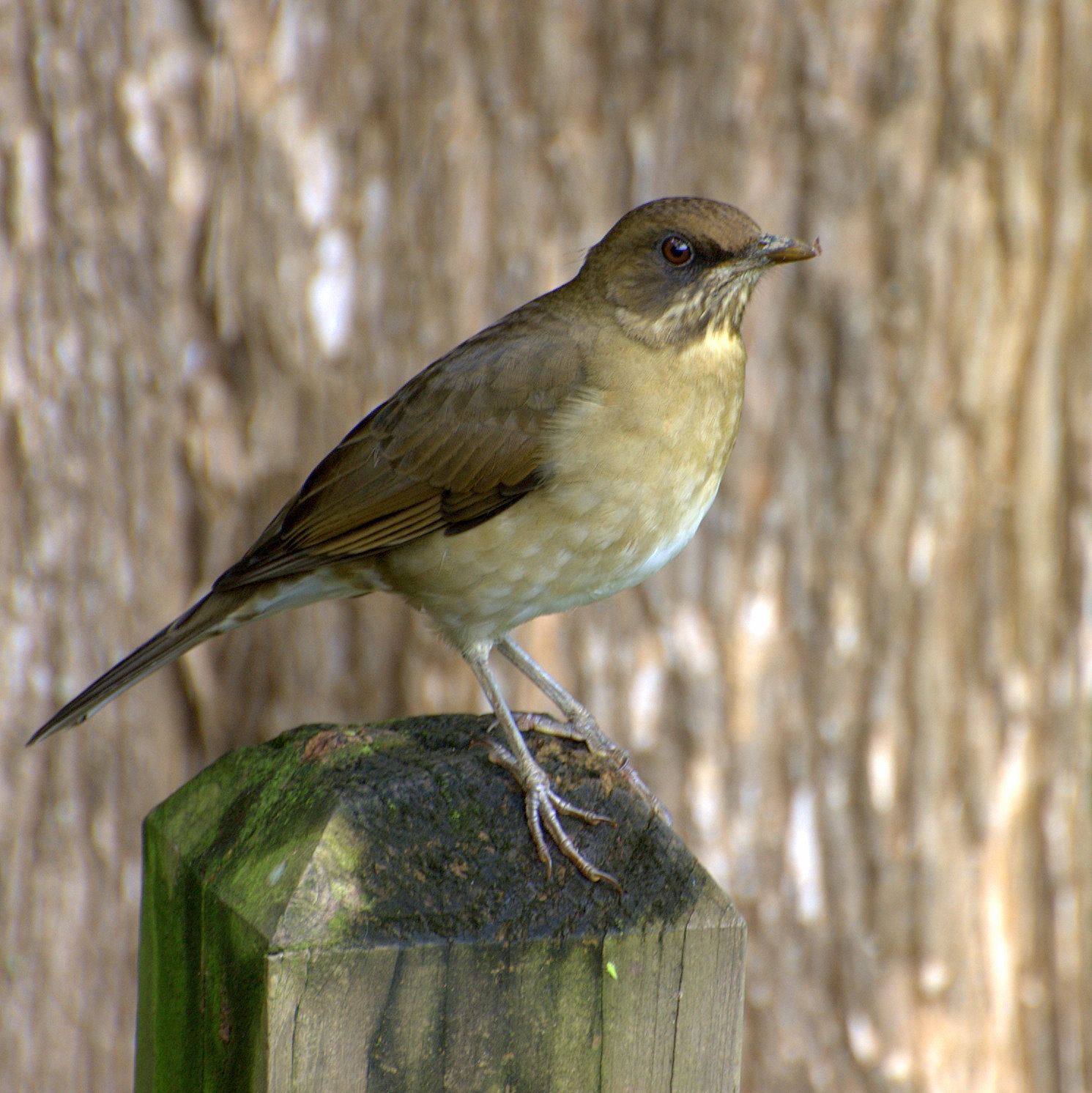
Creamy-bellied thrush

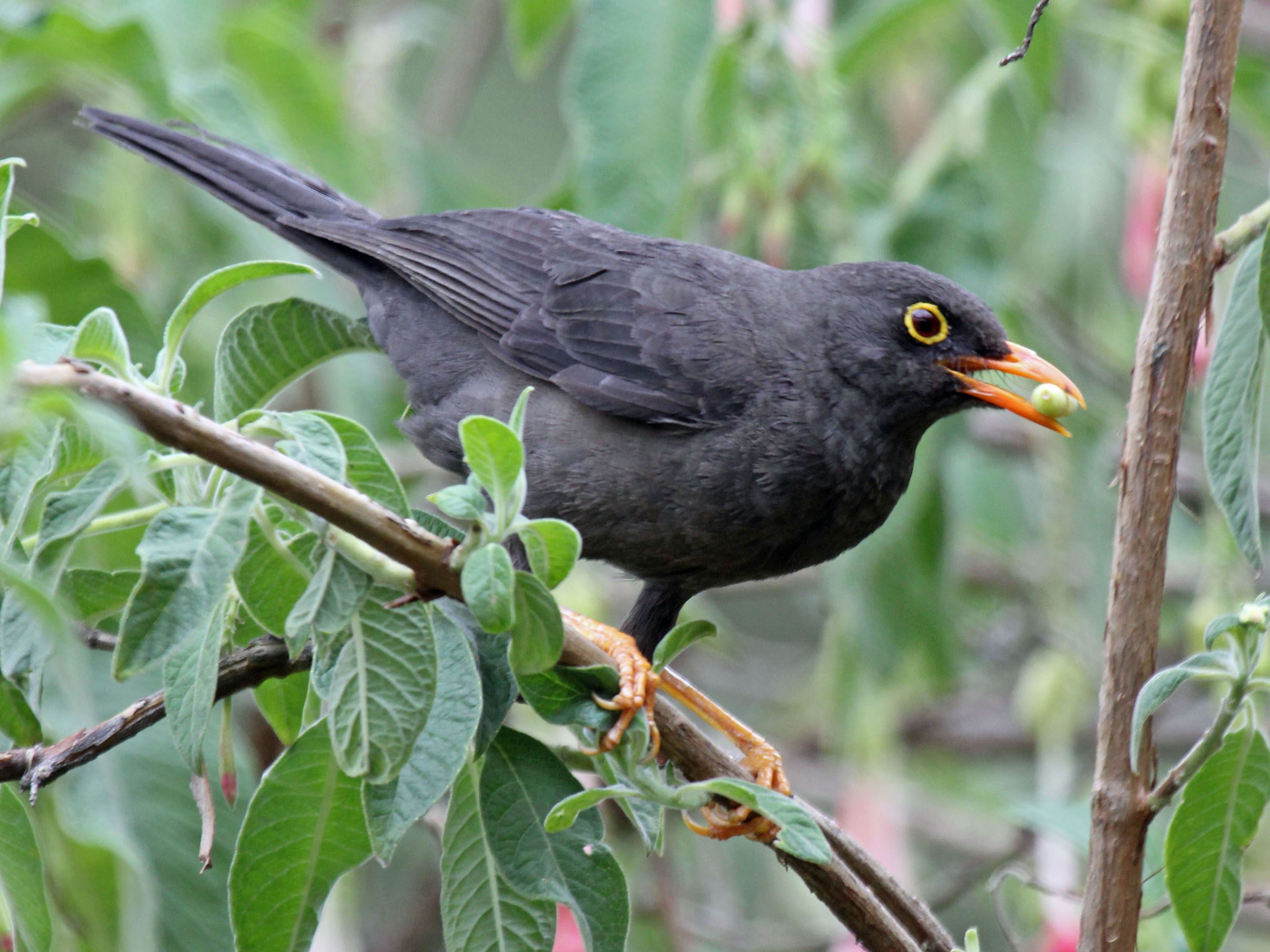
Glossy-black thrush
- Varied solitaire, Myadestes coloratus
- Andean solitaire, Myadestes ralloides (E-SA)
- Orange-billed nightingale-thrush, Catharus aurantiirostris
- Slaty-backed nightingale-thrush, Catharus fuscater
- Speckled nightingale-thrush, Catharus maculatus (E-SA)
- Veery, Catharus fuscescens
- Gray-cheeked thrush, Catharus minimus
- Swainson's thrush, Catharus ustulatus
- Wood thrush, Hylocichla mustelina (V)
- Black solitaire, Entomodestes coracinus (E-SA)
- White-eared solitaire, Entomodestes leucotis (E-SA)
- Rufous-brown solitaire, Cichlopsis leucogenys (E-SA)
- Pale-eyed thrush, Turdus leucops (E-SA)
- Austral thrush, Turdus falcklandii (E-SA)
- Plumbeous-backed thrush, Turdus reevei (E-SA)
- Yellow-legged thrush, Turdus flavipes (E-SA)
- Pale-breasted thrush, Turdus leucomelas (E-SA)
- Cocoa thrush, Turdus fumigatus
- Hauxwell's thrush, Turdus hauxwelli (E-SA)
- Pale-vented thrush, Turdus obsoletus
- Rufous-bellied thrush, Turdus rufiventris (E-SA)
- Clay-colored thrush, Turdus grayi
- Redwing, Turdus iliacus (UC) (V, not on the SACC list)
- Spectacled thrush, Turdus nudigenis
- Ecuadorian thrush, Turdus maculirostris (E-SA)
- Varzea thrush, Turdus sanchezorum (E-SA)
- Unicolored thrush, Turdus haplochrous (E-BO)
- Lawrence's thrush, Turdus lawrencii (E-SA)
- Pantepui thrush, Turdus murinus (E-SA)
- Creamy-bellied thrush, Turdus amaurochalinus (E-SA)
- Black-billed thrush, Turdus ignobilis (E-SA)
- Campina thrush, Turdus arthuri (E-SA)
- Marañon thrush, Turdus maranonicus (E-SA)
- Chestnut-bellied thrush, Turdus fulviventris (E-SA)
- Black-hooded thrush, Turdus olivater (E-SA)
- Andean slaty thrush, Turdus nigriceps (E-SA)
- Blacksmith thrush, Turdus subalaris (E-SA)
- Great thrush, Turdus fuscater (E-SA)
- Chiguanco thrush, Turdus chiguanco (E-SA)
- Glossy-black thrush, Turdus serranus (E-SA)
- Dagua thrush, Turdus daguae
- Gray-flanked thrush, Turdus phaeopygus (E-SA)
- Rufous-flanked thrush, Turdus albicollis (E-SA)

== Old World flycatchers ==
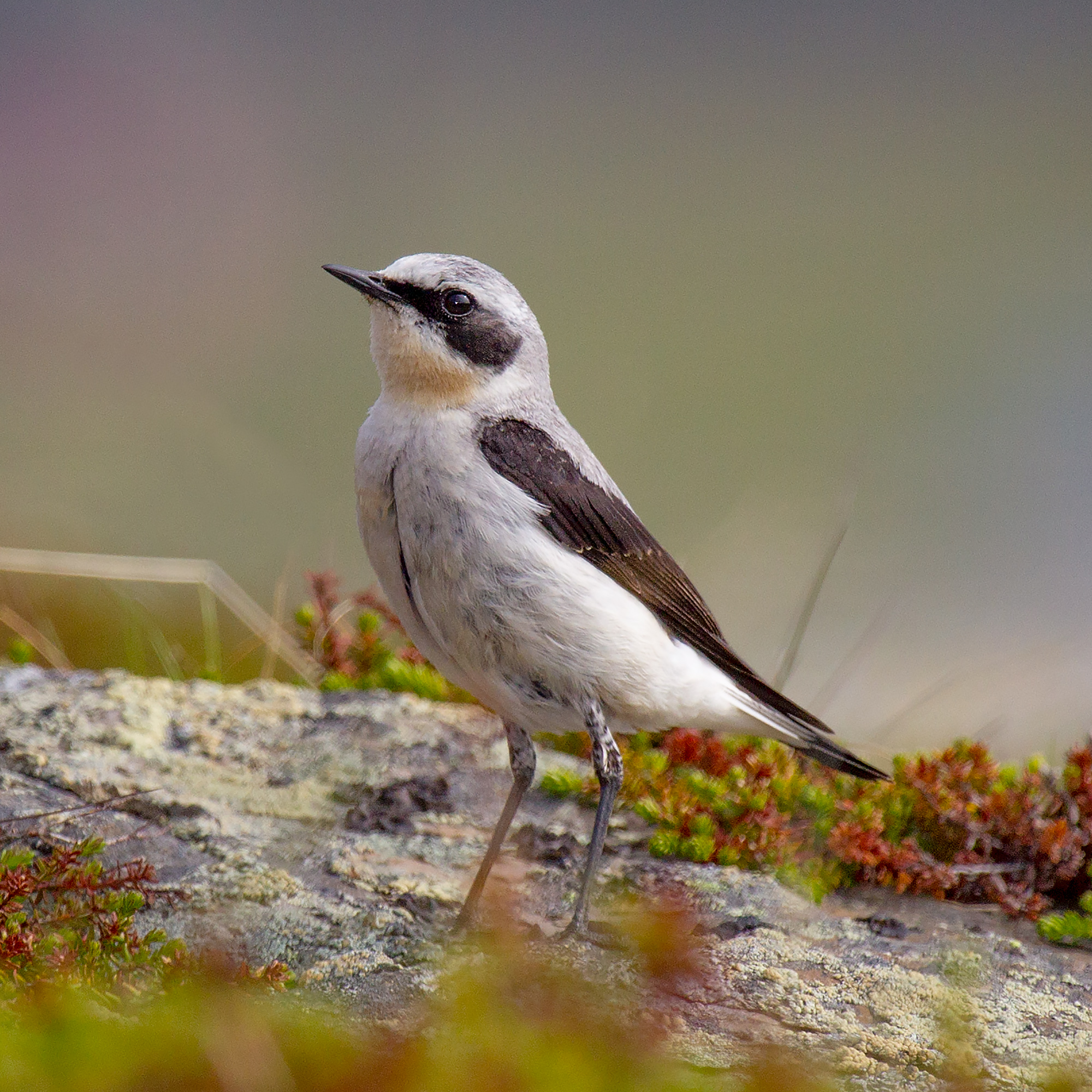
Northern wheatear

Order: Passeriformes Family: Muscicapidae

Old World flycatchers are a large group of small passerine birds native to the Old World. They are mainly small arboreal insectivores. The appearance of these birds is highly varied, but they mostly have weak songs and harsh calls.

- Northern wheatear, Oenanthe oenanthe (V)

== Mockingbirds ==
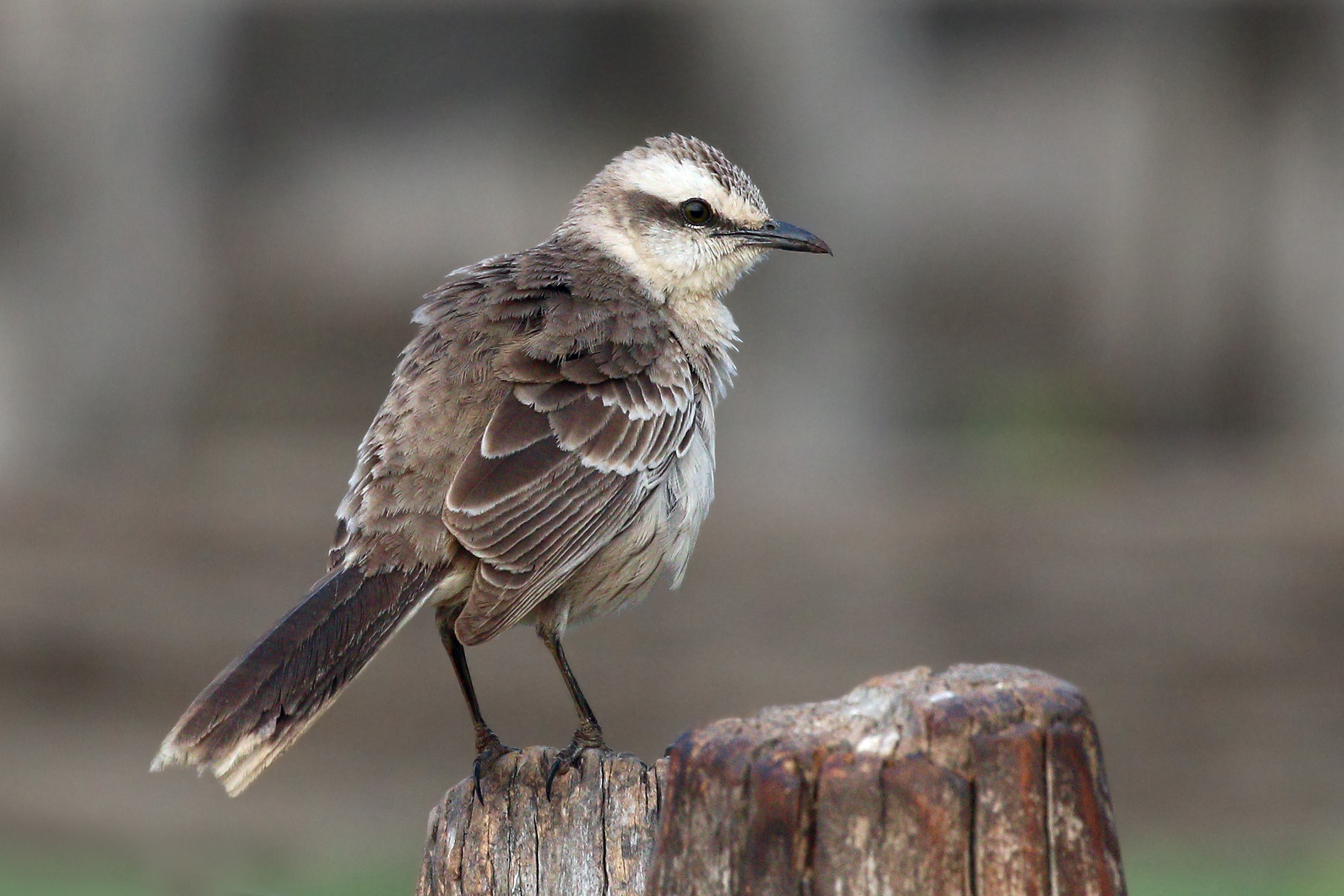
Chalk-browed mockingbird

Order: Passeriformes Family: Mimidae

The mimids are a family of passerine birds that includes thrashers, mockingbirds, tremblers, and the New World catbirds. These birds are notable for their vocalizations, especially their ability to mimic a wide variety of birds and other sounds heard outdoors. Their coloring tends towards dull-grays and browns.

- Gray catbird, Dumetella carolinensis (V)
- Tropical mockingbird, Mimus gilvus
- Long-tailed mockingbird, Mimus longicaudatus (E-SA)
- Chilean mockingbird, Mimus thenca (E-SA)
- Patagonian mockingbird, Mimus patagonicus (E-SA)
- Chalk-browed mockingbird, Mimus saturninus (E-SA)
- White-banded mockingbird, Mimus triurus (E-SA)
- Brown-backed mockingbird, Mimus dorsalis (E-SA)
- Galapagos mockingbird, Mimus parvulus (E-GA)
- Floreana mockingbird, Mimus trifasciatus (E-GA)
- Española mockingbird, Mimus macdonaldi (E-GA)
- San Cristobal mockingbird, Mimus melanotis (E-GA)
- Brown thrasher, Toxostoma rufum (V)
- Pearly-eyed thrasher, Margarops fuscatus

== Starlings ==
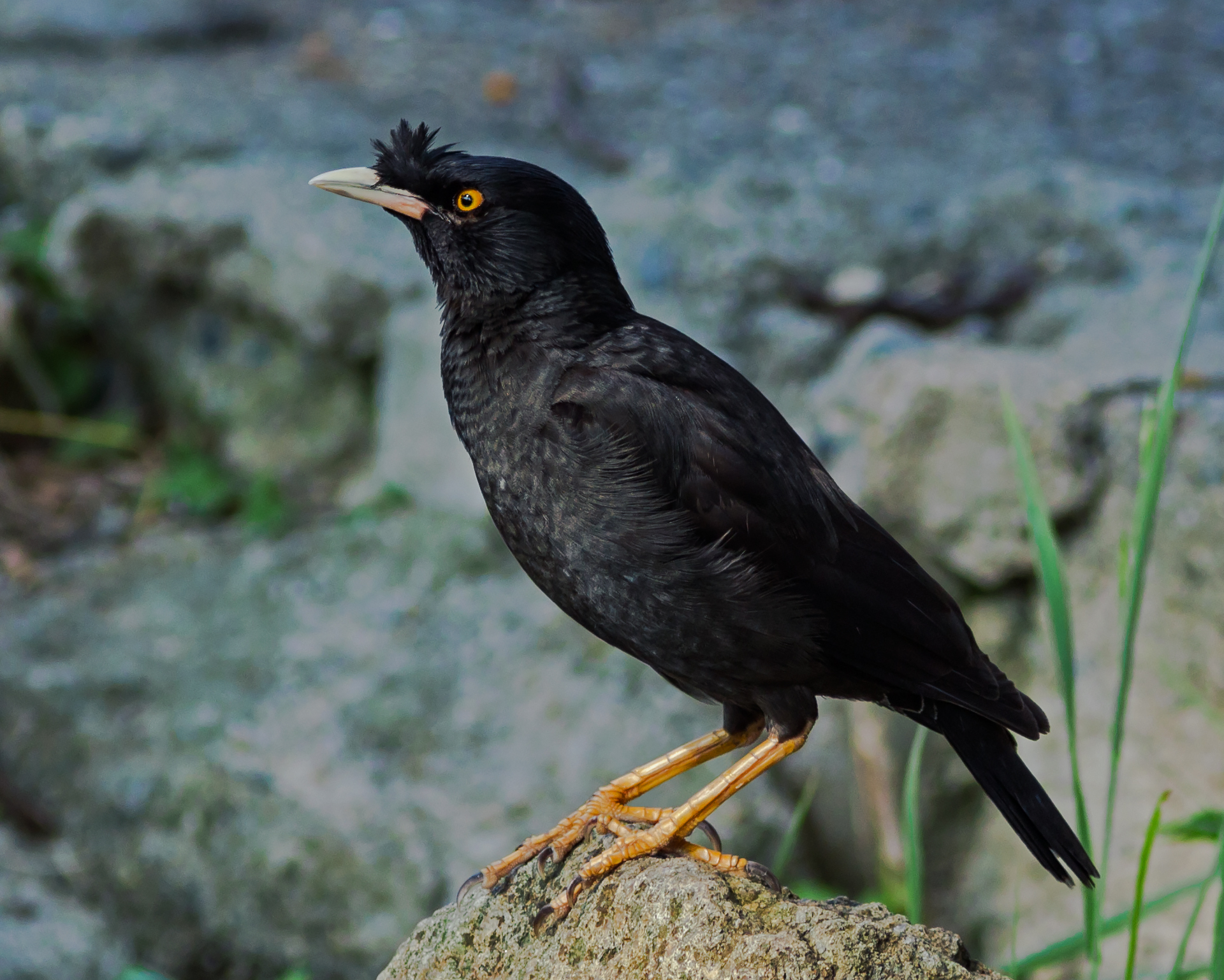
Crested myna

Order: Passeriformes Family: Sturnidae

Starlings are small to medium-sized passerine birds. Their flight is strong and direct and they are very gregarious. Their preferred habitat is fairly open country. They eat insects and fruit. Plumage is typically dark with a metallic sheen.

- Crested myna, Acridotheres cristatellus (I)
- European starling, Sturnus vulgaris (I)

== Weavers ==
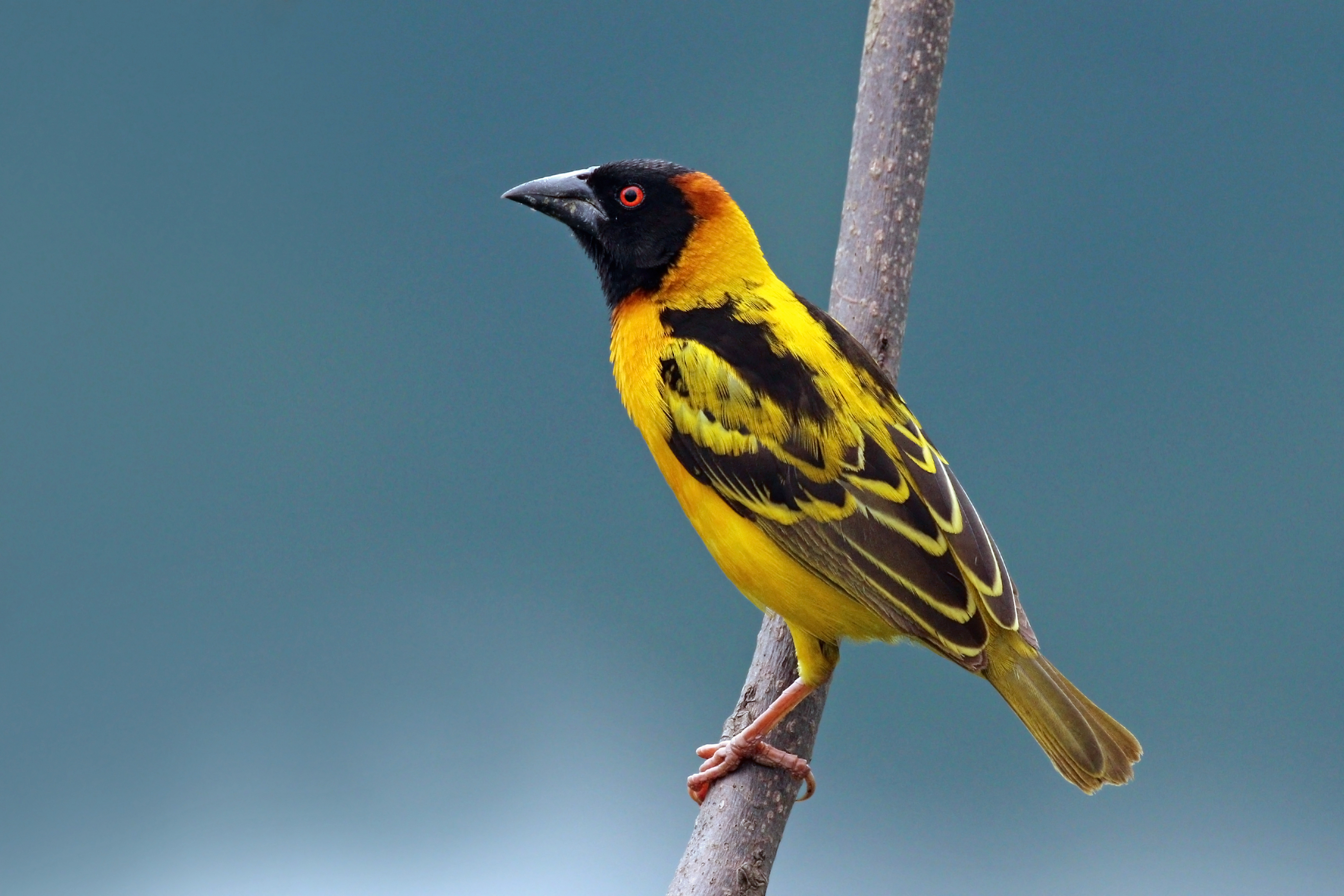
Village weaver

Order: Passeriformes Family: Ploceidae

The weavers are small passerine birds related to the finches. They are seed-eating birds with rounded conical bills. The males of many species are brightly colored, usually in red or yellow and black, some species show variation in color only in the breeding season.

- Village weaver, Ploceus cucullatus (I)
- African masked weaver, Ploceus velatus (I)

== Estrildids ==
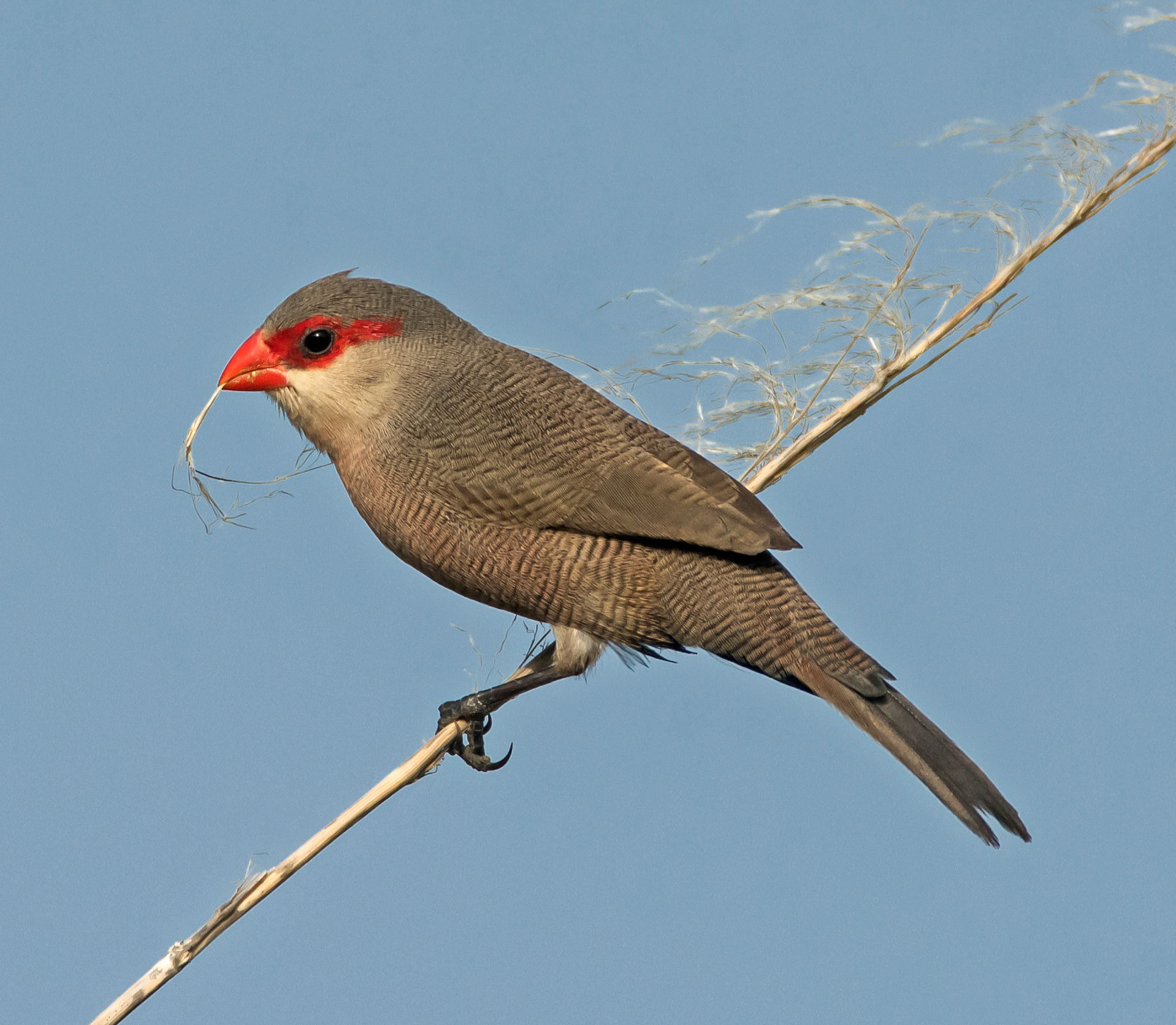
Common waxbill

Order: Passeriformes Family: Estrildidae

The estrildid finches are small passerine birds of the Old World tropics and Australasia. They are gregarious and often colonial seed eaters with short thick but pointed bills. They are all similar in structure and habits, but have a wide variation in plumage colors and patterns.

- Common waxbill, Estrilda astrild (I)
- Tricolored munia, Lonchura malacca (I)
- Java sparrow, Lonchura oryzivora (I)

== Old World sparrows ==
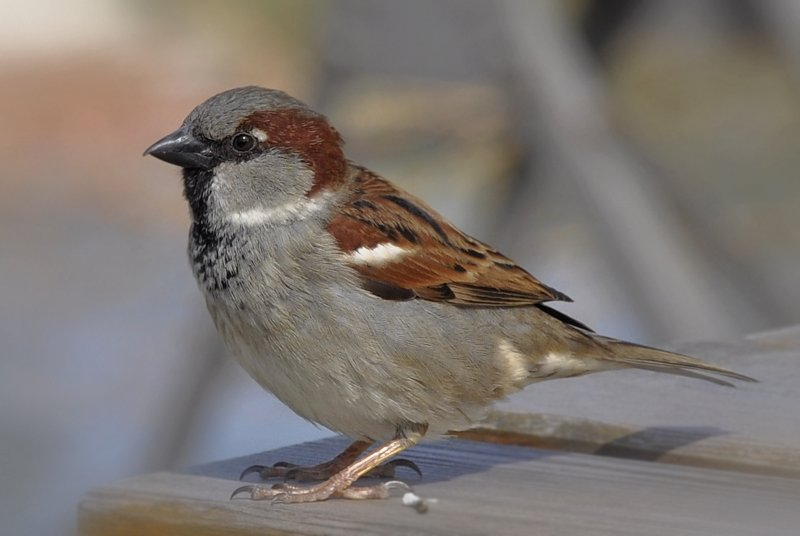
House sparrow

Order: Passeriformes Family: Passeridae

Old World sparrows are small passerine birds. In general, sparrows tend to be small, plump, brown or gray birds with short tails and short powerful beaks. Sparrows are seed eaters, but they also consume small insects.

- House sparrow, Passer domesticus (I)

== Pipits ==
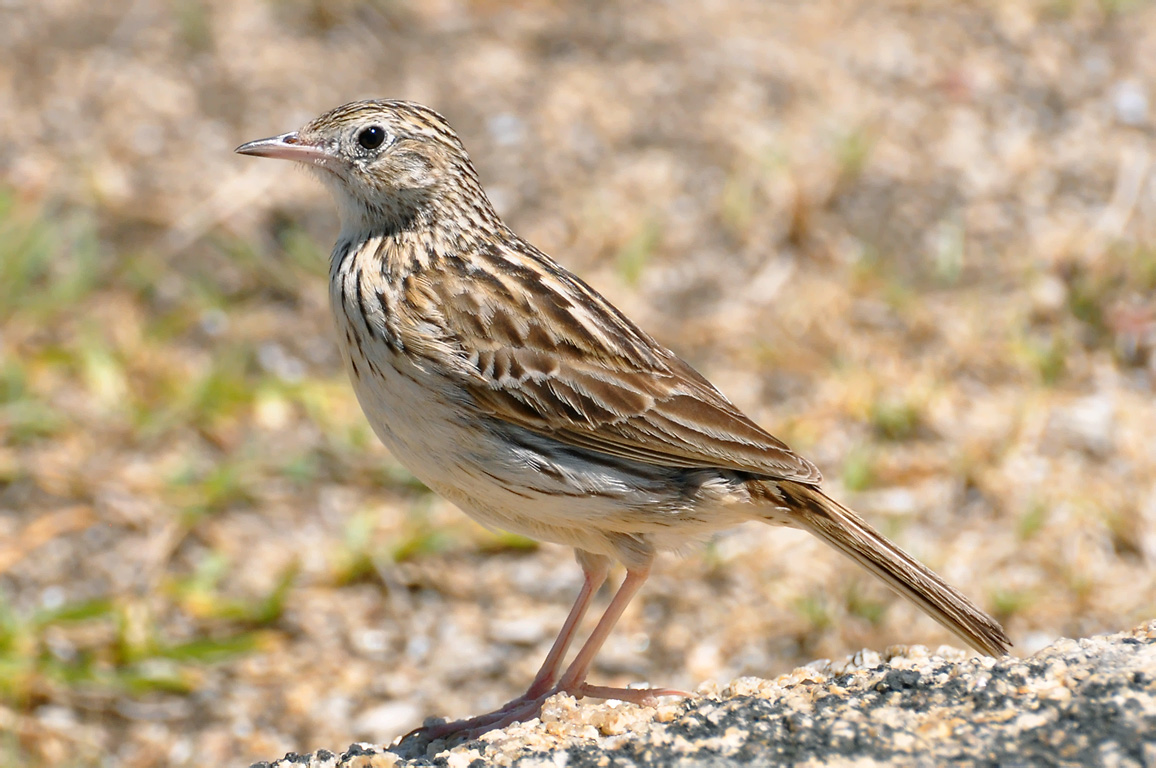
Correndera pipit

Order: Passeriformes Family: Motacillidae

Motacillidae is a family of small passerine birds with medium to long tails. They include the wagtails, longclaws, and pipits. They are slender ground-feeding insectivores of open country.

- White wagtail, Motacilla alba (V)
- Red-throated pipit, Anthus cervinus (V)
- Yellowish pipit, Anthus chii
- Short-billed pipit, Anthus furcatus (E-SA)
- Peruvian pipit, Anthus peruvianus (E-SA)
- Pampas pipit, Anthus chacoensis (E-SA)
- Correndera pipit, Anthus correndera (E-SA)
- Ochre-breasted pipit, Anthus nattereri (E-SA)
- Hellmayr's pipit, Anthus hellmayri (E-SA)
- Paramo pipit, Anthus bogotensis (E-SA)

== Finches ==
Order: Passeriformes Family: Fringillidae

Finches are seed-eating passerine birds, that are small to moderately large and have a strong beak, usually conical and in some species very large. All have twelve tail feathers and nine primaries. These birds have a bouncing flight with alternating bouts of flapping and gliding on closed wings, and most sing well.

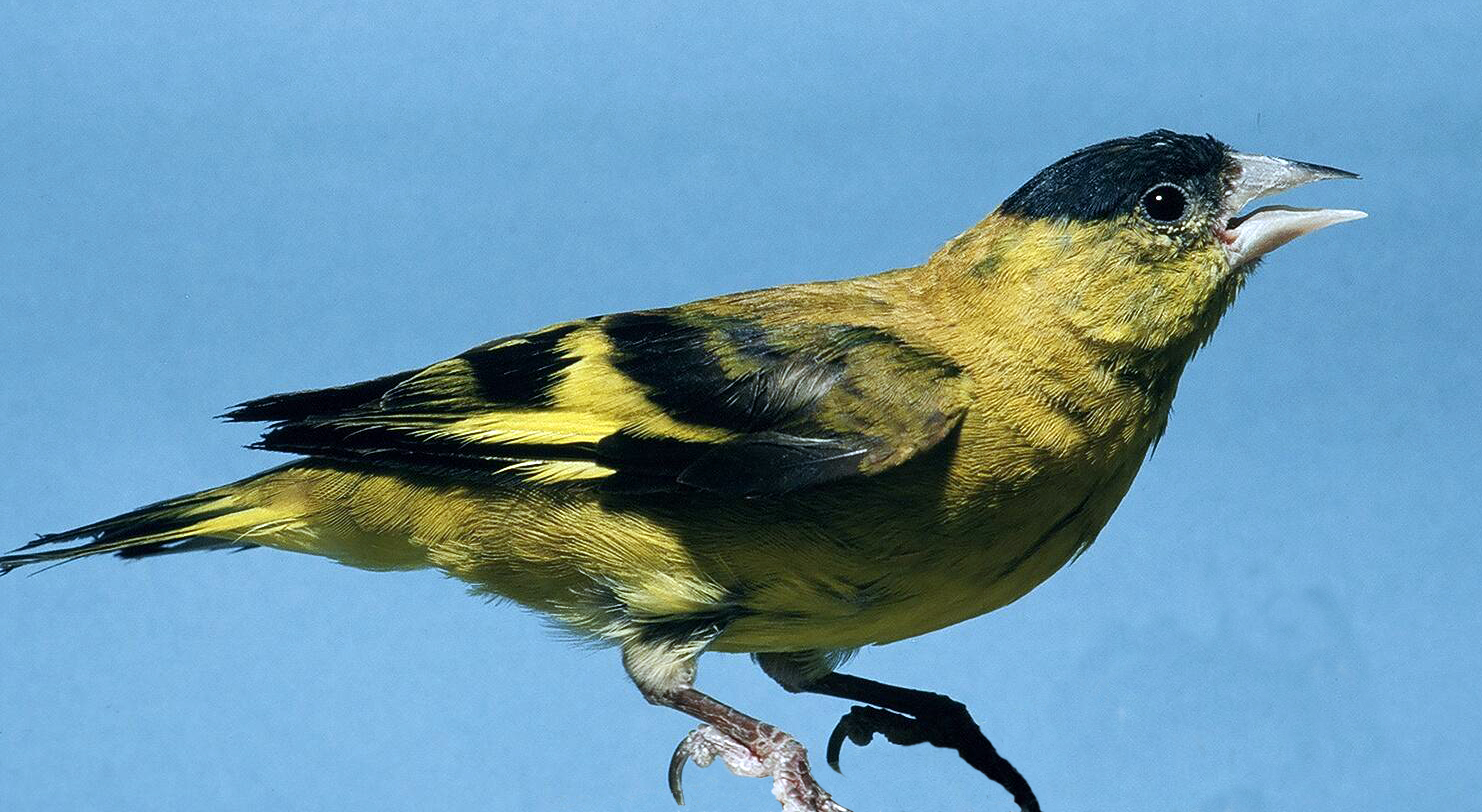
Andean siskin

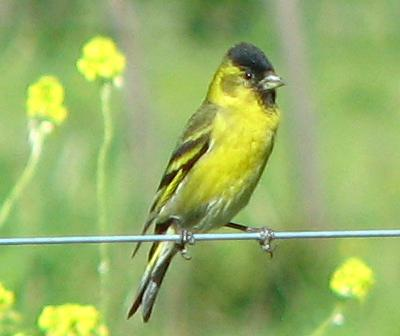
Black-chinned siskin

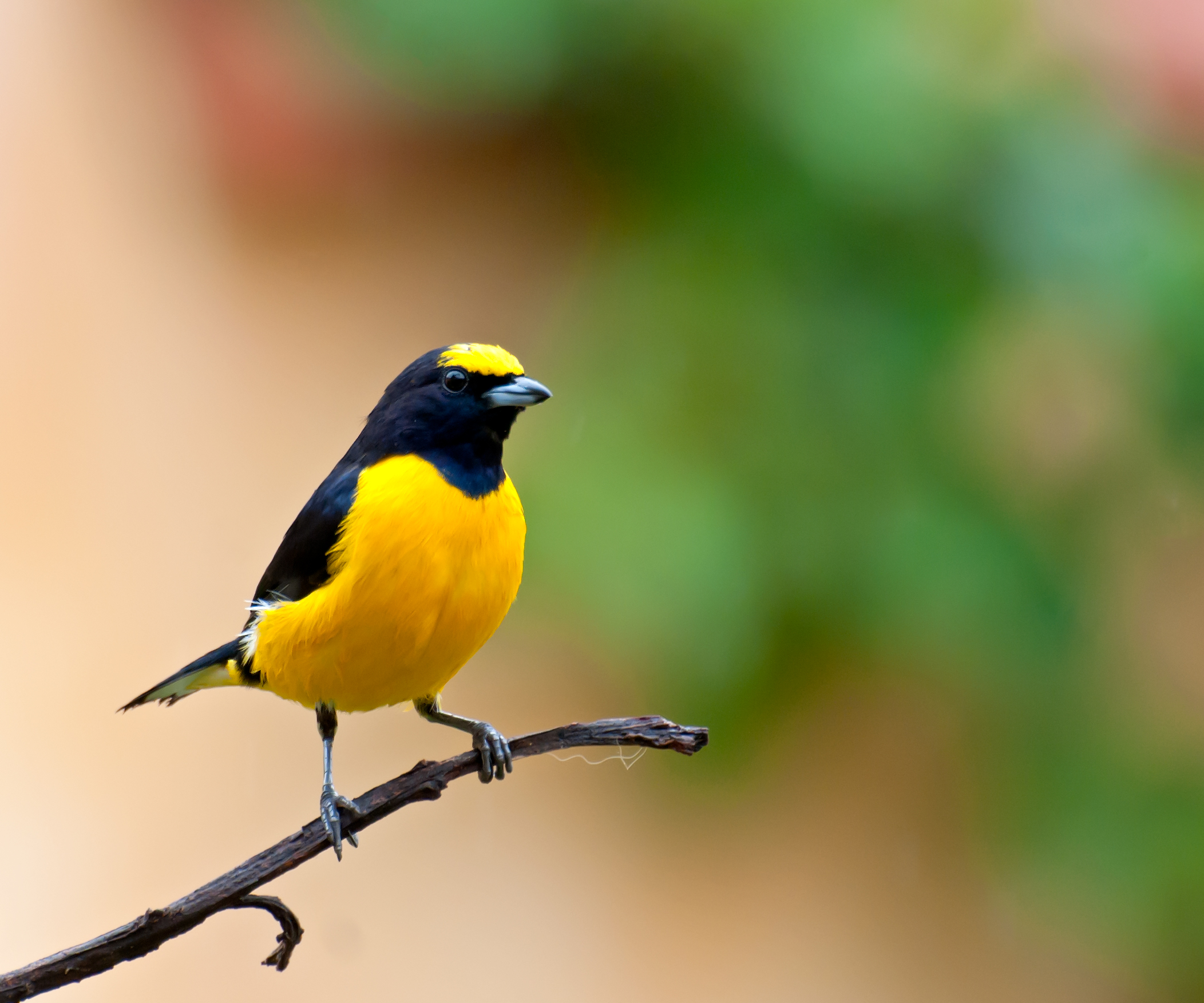
Purple-throated euphonia

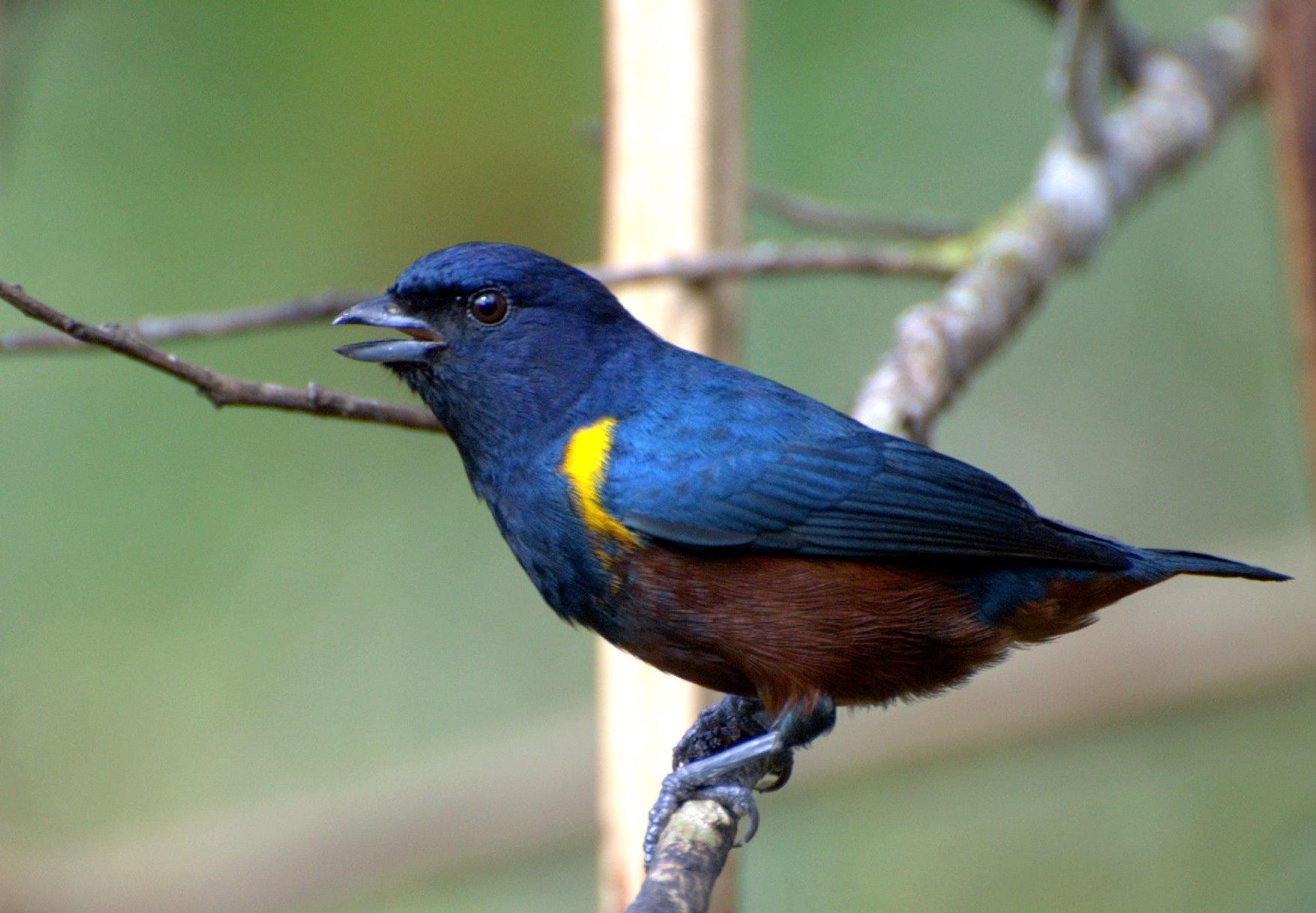
Chestnut-bellied euphonia
- European greenfinch, Chloris chloris (I)
- European goldfinch, Carduelis carduelis (I)
- Andean siskin, Spinus spinescens (E-SA)
- Yellow-faced siskin, Spinus yarrellii (E-BR)
- Red siskin, Spinus cucullatus (E-SA)
- Thick-billed siskin, Spinus crassirostris (E-SA)
- Hooded siskin, Spinus magellanicus (E-SA)
- Saffron siskin, Spinus siemiradzkii (E-SA)
- Olivaceous siskin, Spinus olivaceus (E-SA)
- Yellow-bellied siskin, Spinus xanthogastrus
- Black siskin, Spinus atratus (E-SA)
- Yellow-rumped siskin, Spinus uropygialis (E-SA)
- Black-chinned siskin, Spinus barbatus (E-SA)
- Lesser goldfinch, Spinus psaltria
- Golden-rumped euphonia, Chlorophonia cyanocephala (E-SA)
- Blue-naped chlorophonia, Chlorophonia cyanea (E-SA)
- Chestnut-breasted chlorophonia, Chlorophonia pyrrhophrys (E-SA)
- Yellow-collared chlorophonia, Chlorophonia flavirostris
- Orange-crowned euphonia, Euphonia saturata (E-SA)
- Plumbeous euphonia, Euphonia plumbea (E-SA)
- Purple-throated euphonia, Euphonia chlorotica (E-SA)
- Finsch's euphonia, Euphonia finschi (E-SA)
- Velvet-fronted euphonia, Euphonia concinna (E-CO)
- Trinidad euphonia, Euphonia trinitatis (E-SA)
- Golden-bellied euphonia, Euphonia chrysopasta (E-SA)
- White-vented euphonia, Euphonia minuta
- Green-throated euphonia, Euphonia chalybea (E-SA)
- Violaceous euphonia, Euphonia violacea (E-SA)
- Thick-billed euphonia, Euphonia laniirostris
- Fulvous-vented euphonia, Euphonia fulvicrissa
- Tawny-capped euphonia, Euphonia anneae
- Orange-bellied euphonia, Euphonia xanthogaster
- Bronze-green euphonia, Euphonia mesochrysa (E-SA)
- Golden-sided euphonia, Euphonia cayennensis (E-SA)
- Rufous-bellied euphonia, Euphonia rufiventris (E-SA)
- Chestnut-bellied euphonia, Euphonia pectoralis (E-SA)

== Thrush-tanager ==
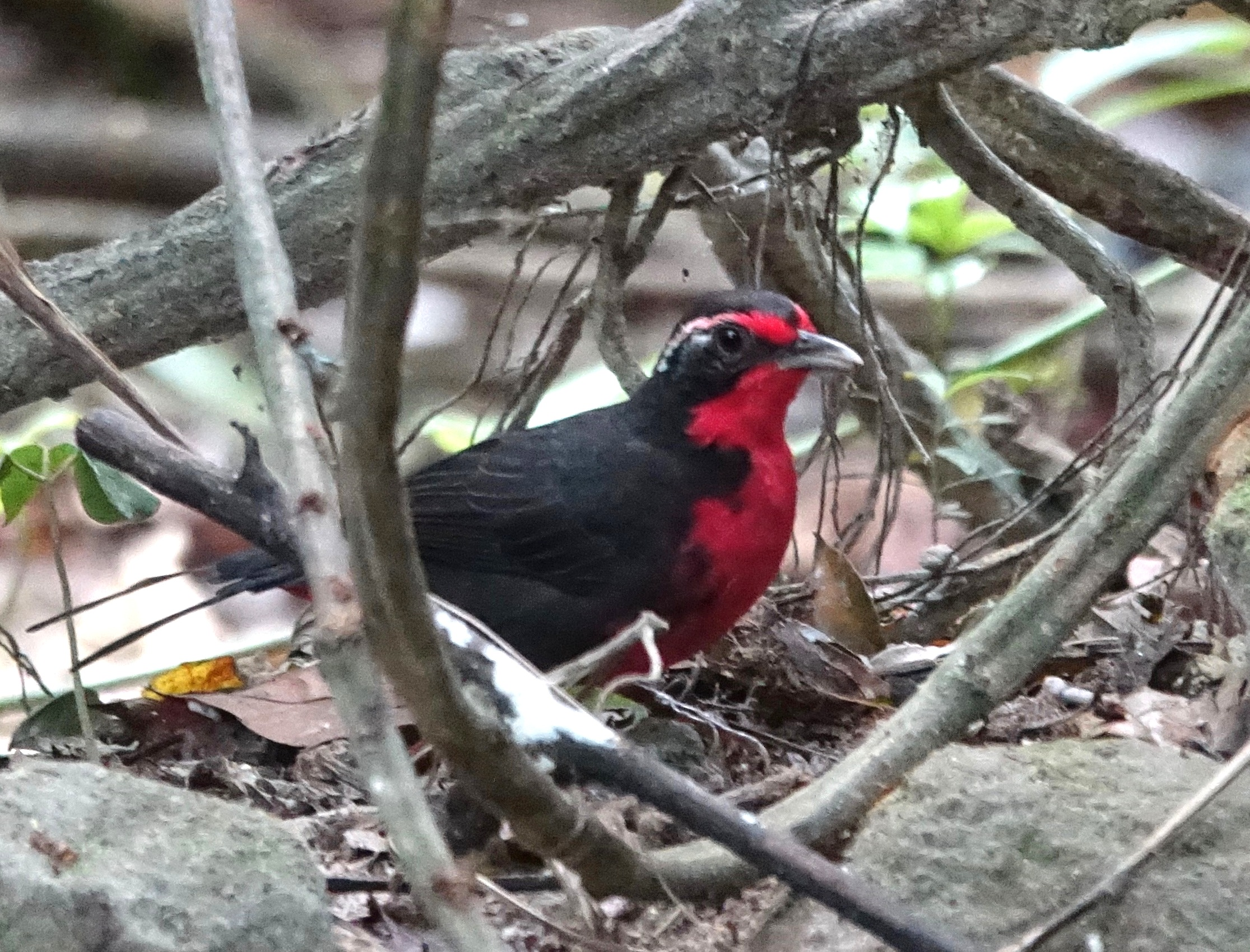
Rosy thrush-tanager

Order: Passeriformes Family: Rhodinocichlidae

This species was historically placed in family Thraupidae, the "true" tanagers. It was placed in its own family in 2017.

- Rosy thrush-tanager, Rhodinocichla rosea

== Sparrows ==
Order: Passeriformes Family: Passerellidae

Most of these species are known as sparrows, but these birds are not closely related to the Old World sparrows which are in the family Passeridae. Many of these have distinctive head patterns.

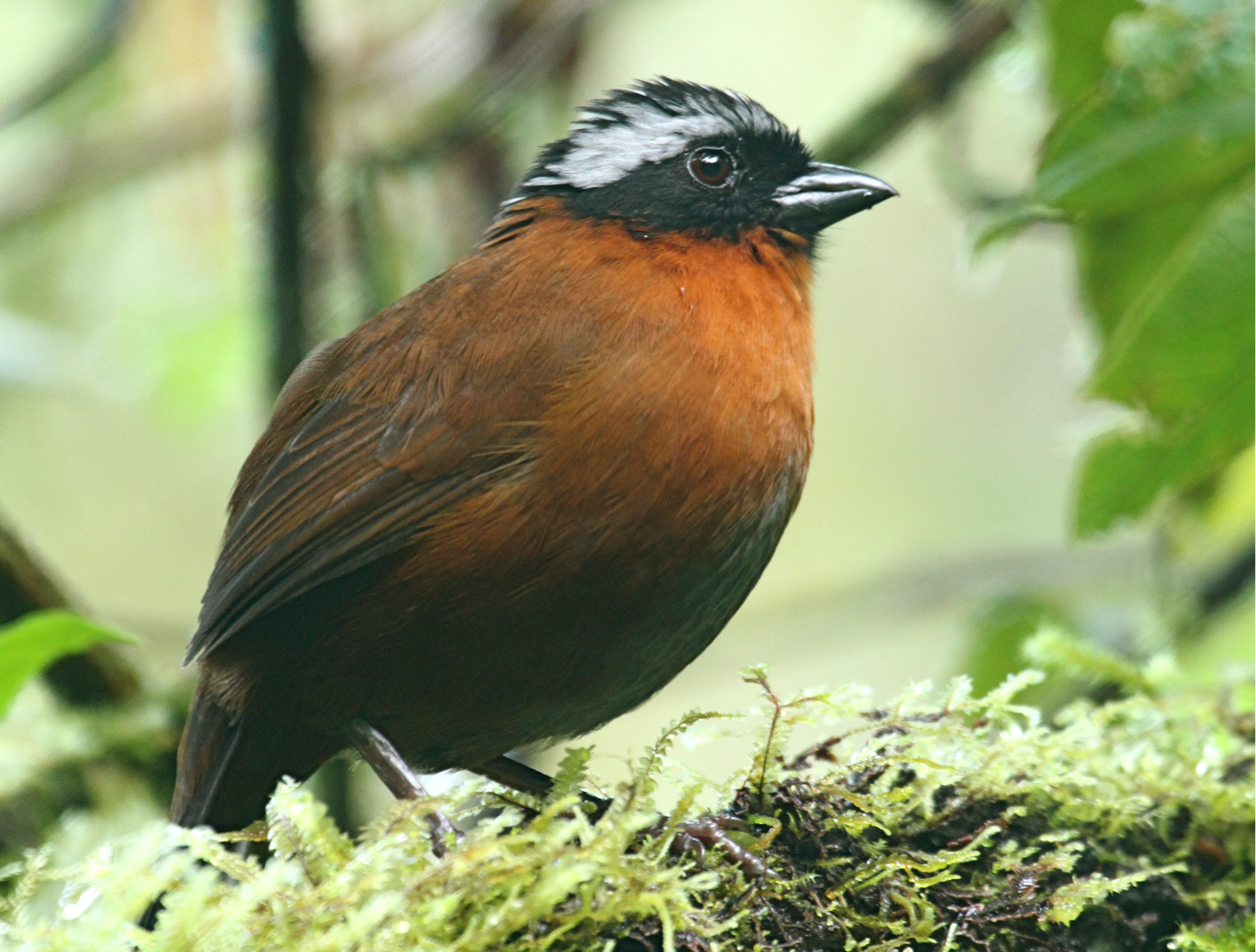
Tanager finch

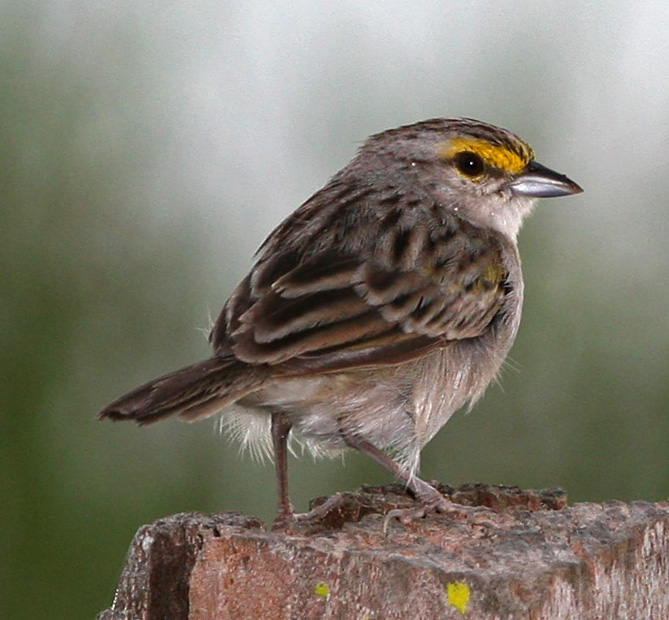
Yellow-browed sparrow

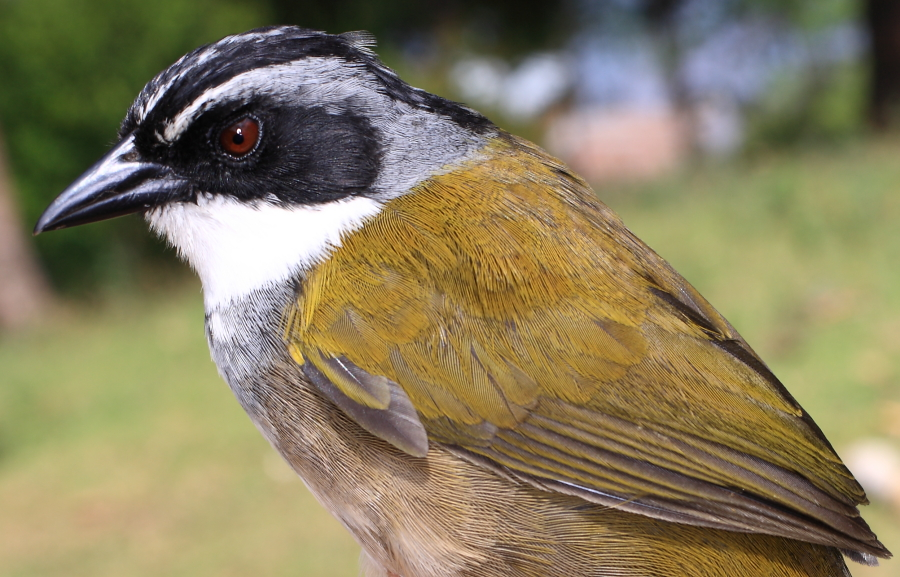
Perija brushfinch

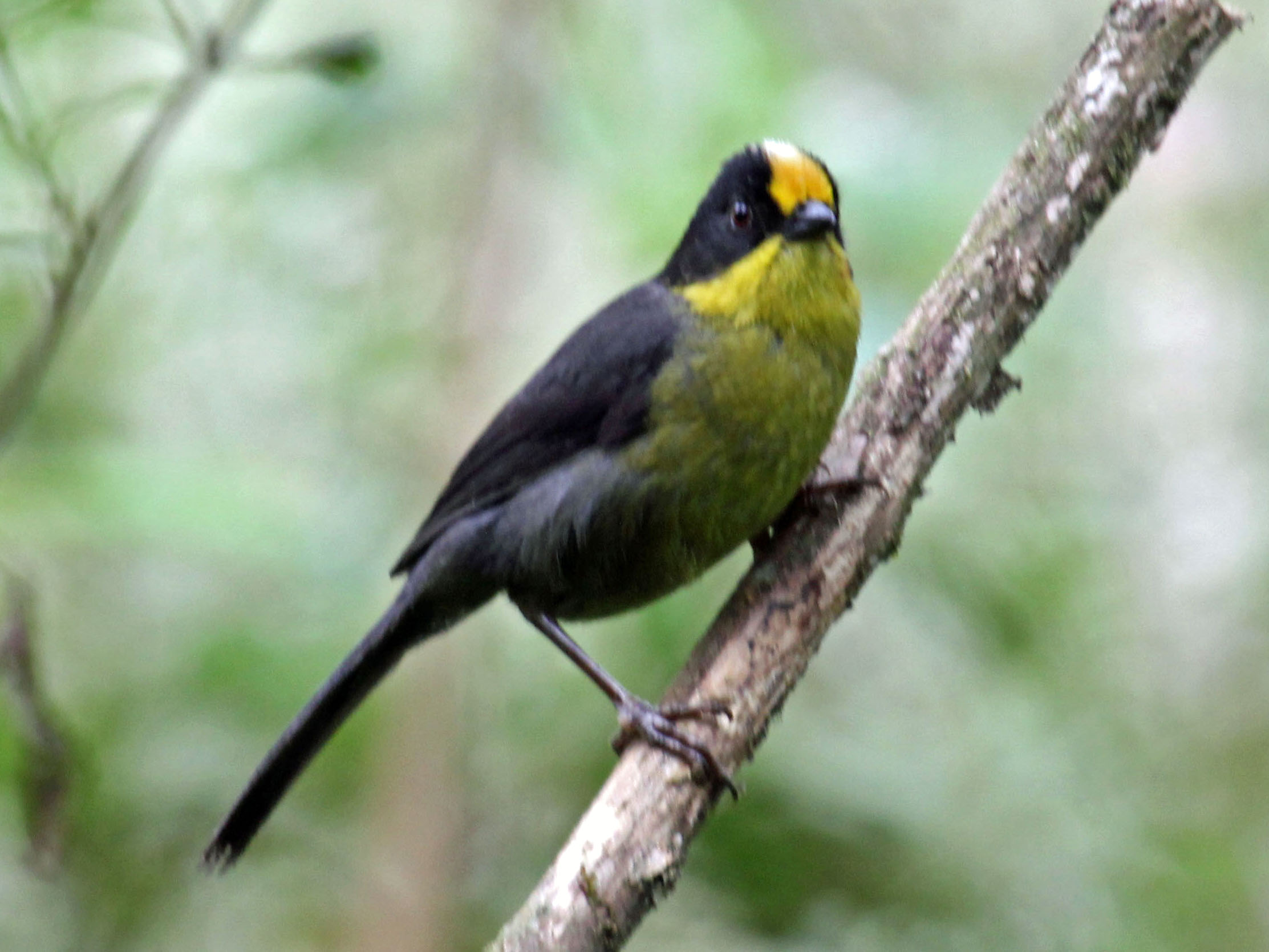
Pale-naped brushfinch

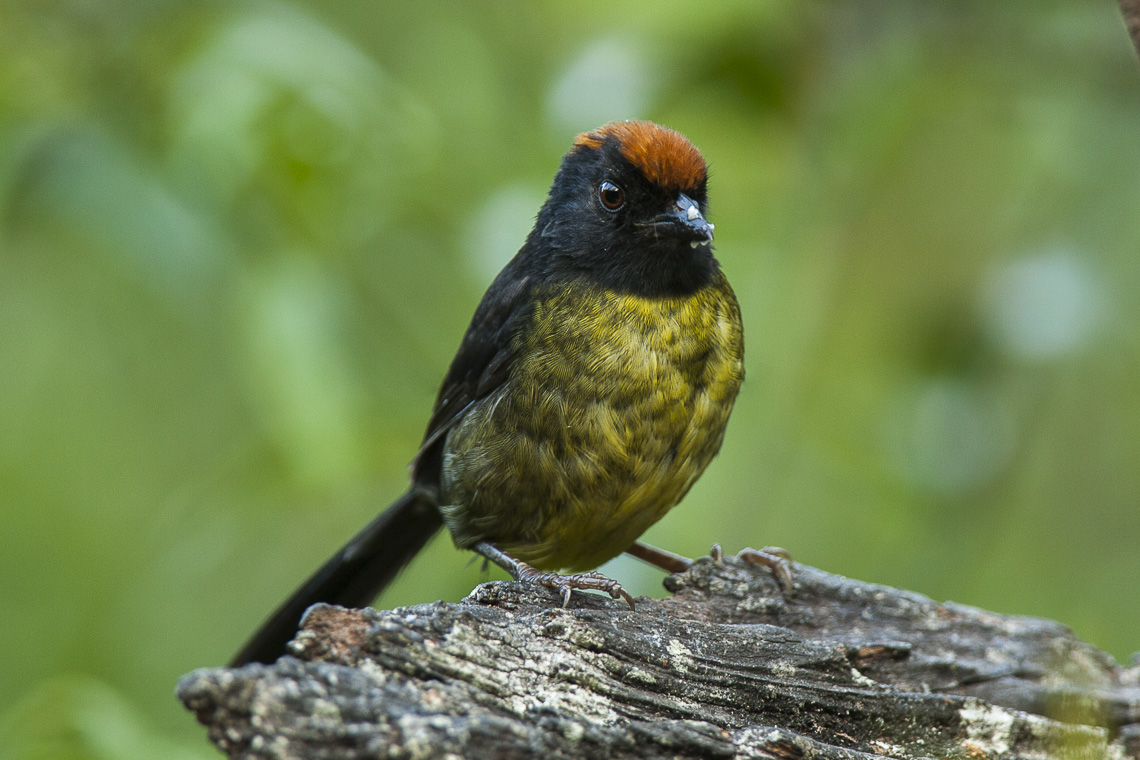
Black-faced brushfinch
- Tanager finch, Oreothraupis arremonops (E-SA)
- Yellow-throated chlorospingus, Chlorospingus flavigularis
- Short-billed chlorospingus, Chlorospingus parvirostris (E-SA)
- Ashy-throated chlorospingus, Chlorospingus canigularis
- Common chlorospingus, Chlorospingus flavopectus
- Tacarcuna chlorospingus, Chlorospingus tacarcunae
- Dusky chlorospingus, Chlorospingus semifuscus (E-SA)
- Tumbes sparrow, Rhynchospiza stolzmanni (E-SA)
- Yungas sparrow, Rhynchospiza dabbenei (E-AR)
- Chaco sparrow, Rhynchospiza strigiceps (E-SA)
- Grasshopper sparrow, Ammodramus savannarum
- Grassland sparrow, Ammodramus humeralis (E-SA)
- Yellow-browed sparrow, Ammodramus aurifrons (E-SA)
- Black-striped sparrow, Arremonops conirostris
- Tocuyo sparrow, Arremonops tocuyensis (E-SA)
- Sierra Nevada brushfinch, Arremon basilicus (E-CO)
- Perija brushfinch, Arremon perijanus (E-SA)
- Black-headed brushfinch, Arremon atricapillus
- Caracas brushfinch, Arremon phaeopleurus (E-VE)
- Paria brushfinch, Arremon phygas (E-VE)
- Gray-browed brushfinch, Arremon assimilis (E-SA)
- White-browed brushfinch, Arremon torquatus (E-SA)
- Orange-billed sparrow, Arremon aurantiirostris
- Black-capped sparrow, Arremon abeillei (E-SA)
- Golden-winged sparrow, Arremon schlegeli (E-SA)
- Yellow-mandibled sparrow, Arremon axillaris (E-SA)
- Pectoral sparrow, Arremon taciturnus (E-SA)
- São Francisco sparrow, Arremon franciscanus (E-BR)
- Half-collared sparrow, Arremon semitorquatus (E-BR)
- Moss-backed sparrow, Arremon dorbignii (E-SA)
- Saffron-billed sparrow, Arremon flavirostris (E-SA)
- Chestnut-capped brushfinch, Arremon brunneinucha
- Sooty-faced finch, Arremon crassirostris
- Olive finch, Arremon castaneiceps (E-SA)
- Clay-colored sparrow, Spizella pallida
- Rufous-collared sparrow, Zonotrichia capensis
- Lincoln's sparrow, Melospiza lincolnii (V)
- White-naped brushfinch, Atlapetes albinucha
- Moustached brushfinch, Atlapetes albofrenatus (E-SA)
- Tepui brushfinch, Atlapetes personatus (E-SA)
- Santa Marta brushfinch, Atlapetes melanocephalus (E-CO)
- Ochre-breasted brushfinch, Atlapetes semirufus (E-SA)
- Yellow-headed brushfinch, Atlapetes flaviceps (E-CO)
- Dusky-headed brushfinch, Atlapetes fuscoolivaceus (E-CO)
- White-rimmed brushfinch, Atlapetes leucopis (E-SA)
- White-headed brushfinch, Atlapetes albiceps (E-SA)
- Rufous-eared brushfinch, Atlapetes rufigenis (E-PE)
- Tricolored brushfinch, Atlapetes tricolor (E-SA)
- Slaty brushfinch, Atlapetes schistaceus (E-SA)
- Pale-naped brushfinch, Atlapetes pallidinucha (E-SA)
- Antioquia brushfinch, Atlapetes blancae (E-CO)
- Yellow-breasted brushfinch, Atlapetes latinuchus (E-SA)
- White-winged brushfinch, Atlapetes leucopterus (E-SA)
- Pale-headed brushfinch, Atlapetes pallidiceps (E-EC)
- Bay-crowned brushfinch, Atlapetes seebohmi (E-SA)
- Rusty-bellied brushfinch, Atlapetes nationi (E-PE)
- Apurimac brushfinch, Atlapetes forbesi (E-PE)
- Black-spectacled brushfinch, Atlapetes melanopsis (E-PE)
- Vilcabamba brushfinch, Atlapetes terborghi (E-PE)
- Cuzco brushfinch, Atlapetes canigenis (E-PE)
- Black-faced brushfinch, Atlapetes melanolaemus (E-SA)
- Bolivian brushfinch, Atlapetes rufinucha (E-BO)
- Fulvous-headed brushfinch, Atlapetes fulviceps (E-SA)
- Yellow-striped brushfinch, Atlapetes citrinellus (E-AR)

== Blackbirds ==
Order: Passeriformes Family: Icteridae

The icterids are a group of small to medium-sized, often colorful, passerine birds restricted to the New World and include the grackles, New World blackbirds, and New World orioles. Most species have black as the predominant plumage color, often enlivened by yellow, orange, or red.

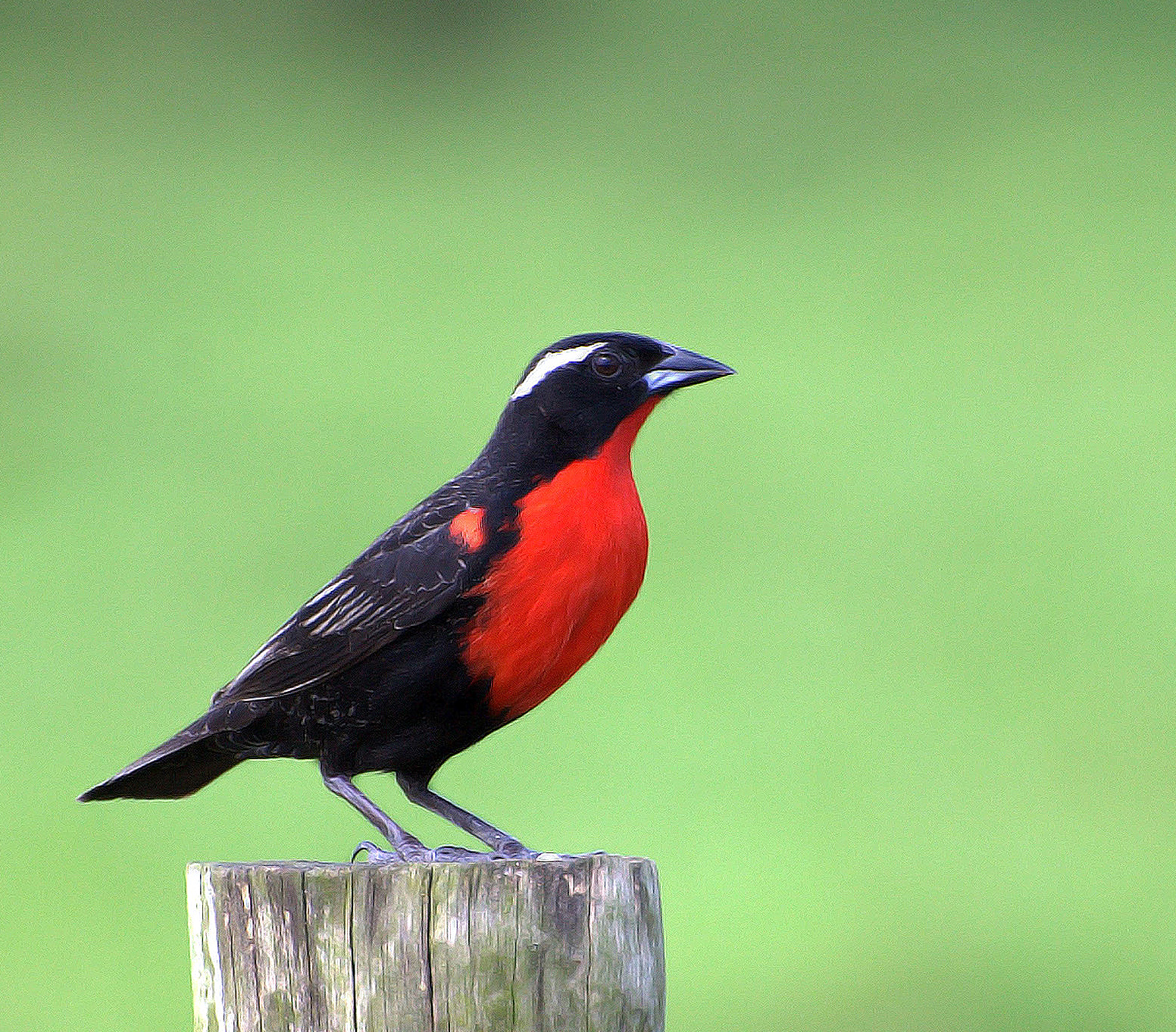
White-browed meadowlark

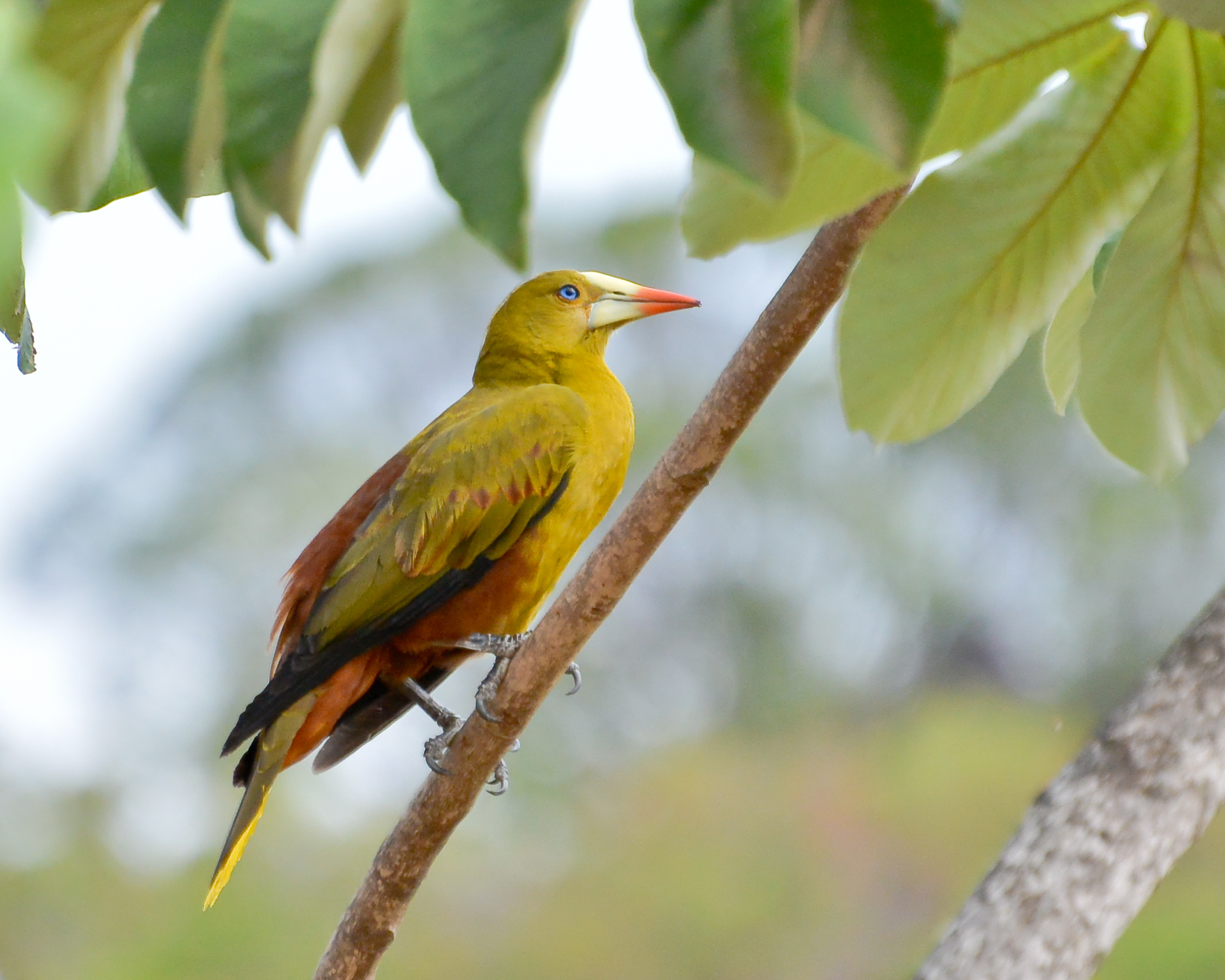
Green oropendola

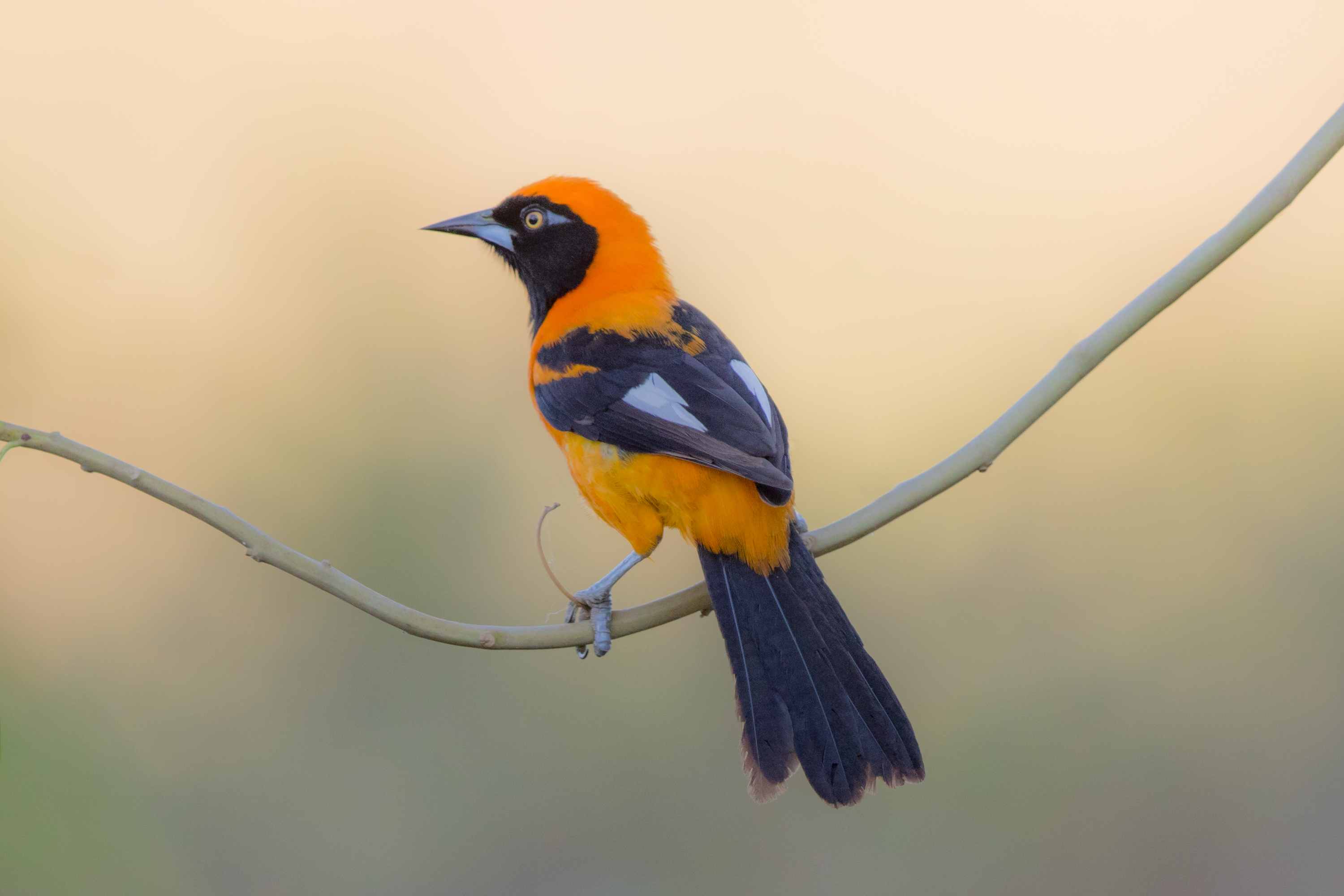
Orange-backed troupial

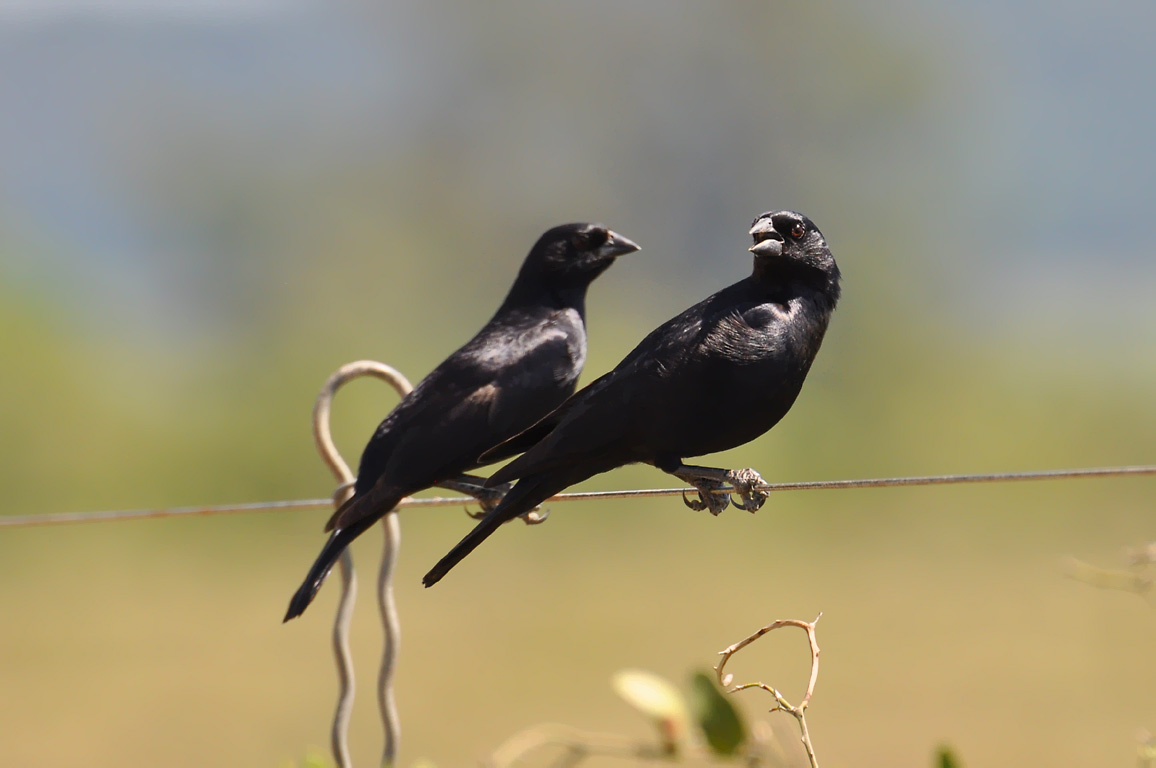
Screaming cowbirds

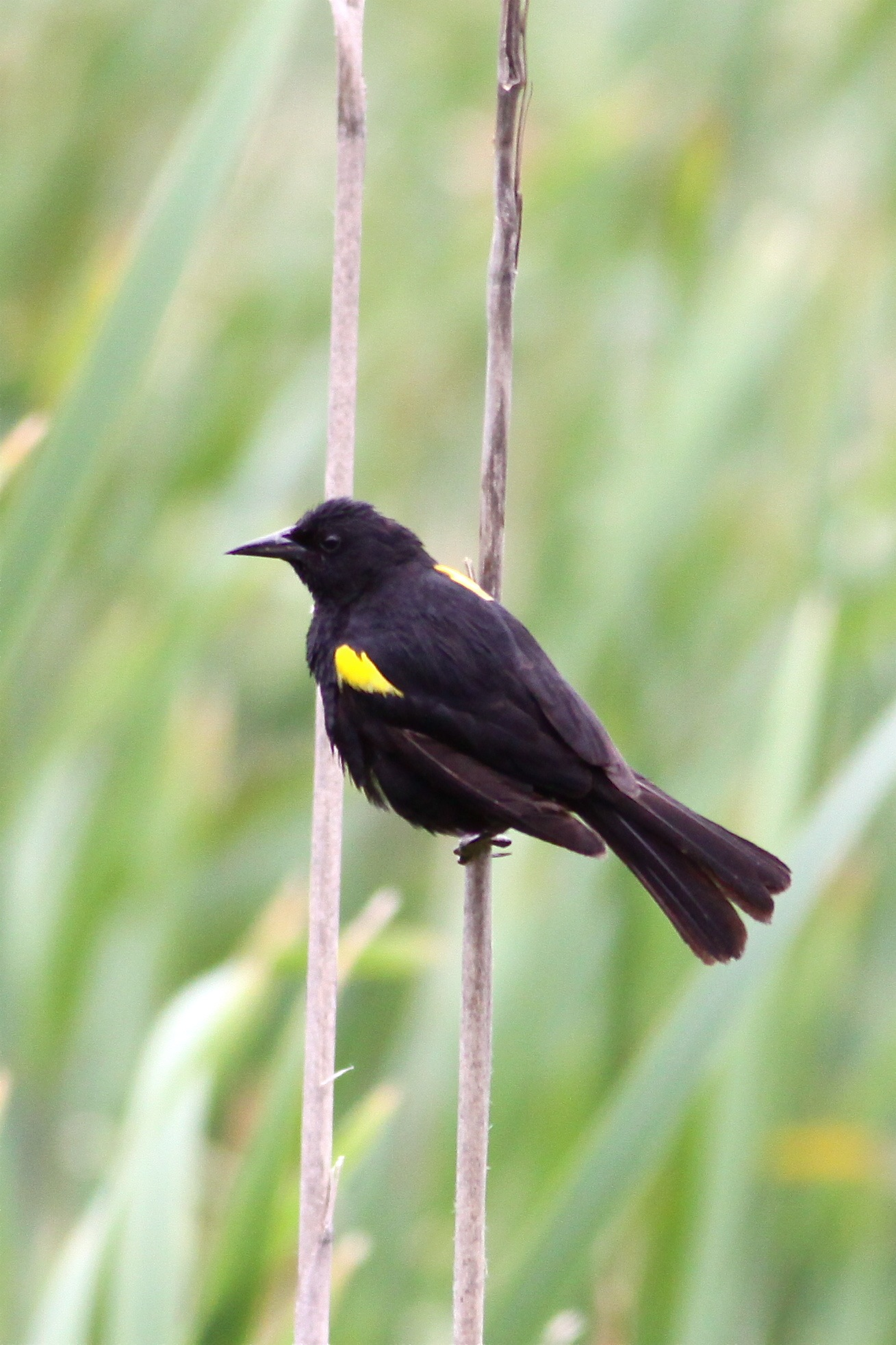
Yellow-winged blackbird
- Yellow-headed blackbird, Xanthocephalus xanthocephalus (V)
- Bobolink, Dolichonyx oryzivorus
- Eastern meadowlark, Sturnella magna
- Red-breasted meadowlark, Leistes militaris
- White-browed meadowlark, Leistes superciliaris (E-SA)
- Peruvian meadowlark, Leistes bellicosus (E-SA)
- Pampas meadowlark, Leistes defilippii (E-SA)
- Long-tailed meadowlark, Leistes loyca (E-SA)
- Yellow-billed cacique, Amblycercus holosericeus
- Russet-backed oropendola, Psarocolius angustifrons (E-SA)
- Dusky-green oropendola, Psarocolius atrovirens (E-SA)
- Green oropendola, Psarocolius viridis (E-SA)
- Chestnut-headed oropendola, Psarocolius wagleri
- Crested oropendola, Psarocolius decumanus
- Black oropendola, Psarocolius guatimozinus
- Baudo oropendola, Psarocolius cassini (E-CO)
- Olive oropendola, Psarocolius bifasciatus (E-SA)
- Solitary black cacique, Cacicus solitarius (E-SA)
- Golden-winged cacique, Cacicus chrysopterus (E-SA)
- Ecuadorian cacique, Cacicus sclateri (E-SA)
- Selva cacique, Cacicus koepckeae (E-PE)
- Scarlet-rumped cacique, Cacicus uropygialis
- Yellow-rumped cacique, Cacicus cela
- Mountain cacique, Cacicus chrysonotus (E-SA)
- Band-tailed cacique, Cacicus latirostris (E-SA)
- Red-rumped cacique, Cacicus haemorrhous (E-SA)
- Casqued cacique, Cacicus oseryi (E-SA)
- Venezuelan troupial, Icterus icterus (E-SA)
- Orange-backed troupial, Icterus croconotus (E-SA)
- Campo troupial, Icterus jamacaii (E-BR)
- White-edged oriole, Icterus graceannae (E-SA)
- Yellow-tailed oriole, Icterus mesomelas
- Epaulet oriole, Icterus cayanensis (E-SA)
- Variable oriole, Icterus pyrrhopterus (E-SA)
- Orchard oriole, Icterus spurius
- Orange-crowned oriole, Icterus auricapillus
- Yellow-backed oriole, Icterus chrysater
- Baltimore oriole, Icterus galbula
- Yellow oriole, Icterus nigrogularis (E-SA)
- Red-winged blackbird, Agelaius phoeniceus (V)
- Screaming cowbird, Molothrus rufoaxillaris (E-SA)
- Giant cowbird, Molothrus oryzivorus
- Bronzed cowbird, Molothrus aeneus
- Shiny cowbird, Molothrus bonariensis (All)
- Scrub blackbird, Dives warczewiczi (E-SA)
- Carib grackle, Quiscalus lugubris
- Great-tailed grackle, Quiscalus mexicanus
- Velvet-fronted grackle, Lampropsar tanagrinus (E-SA)
- Red-bellied grackle, Hypopyrrhus pyrohypogaster (E-CO)
- Oriole blackbird, Gymnomystax mexicanus (E-SA)
- Mountain grackle, Macroagelaius subalaris (E-CO)
- Golden-tufted grackle, Macroagelaius imthurni (E-SA)
- Scarlet-headed blackbird, Amblyramphus holosericeus (E-SA)
- Austral blackbird, Curaeus curaeus (E-SA)
- Forbes's blackbird, Anumara forbesi (E-BR)
- Chopi blackbird, Gnorimopsar chopi (E-SA)
- Grayish baywing, Agelaioides badius (E-SA)
- Pale baywing, Agelaioides fringillarius (E-BR)
- Bolivian blackbird, Oreopsar bolivianus (E-BO)
- Pale-eyed blackbird, Agelasticus xanthophthalmus (E-SA)
- Unicolored blackbird, Agelasticus cyanopus (E-SA)
- Yellow-winged blackbird, Agelasticus thilius (E-SA)
- Chestnut-capped blackbird, Chrysomus ruficapillus (E-SA)
- Yellow-hooded blackbird, Chrysomus icterocephalus (E-SA)
- Saffron-cowled blackbird, Xanthopsar flavus (E-SA)
- Yellow-rumped marshbird, Pseudoleistes guirahuro (E-SA)
- Brown-and-yellow marshbird, Pseudoleistes virescens (E-SA)

== Wood-warblers ==
Order: Passeriformes Family: Parulidae

The wood-warblers are a group of small, often colorful, passerine birds restricted to the New World. Most are arboreal, but some are terrestrial. Most members of this family are insectivores.

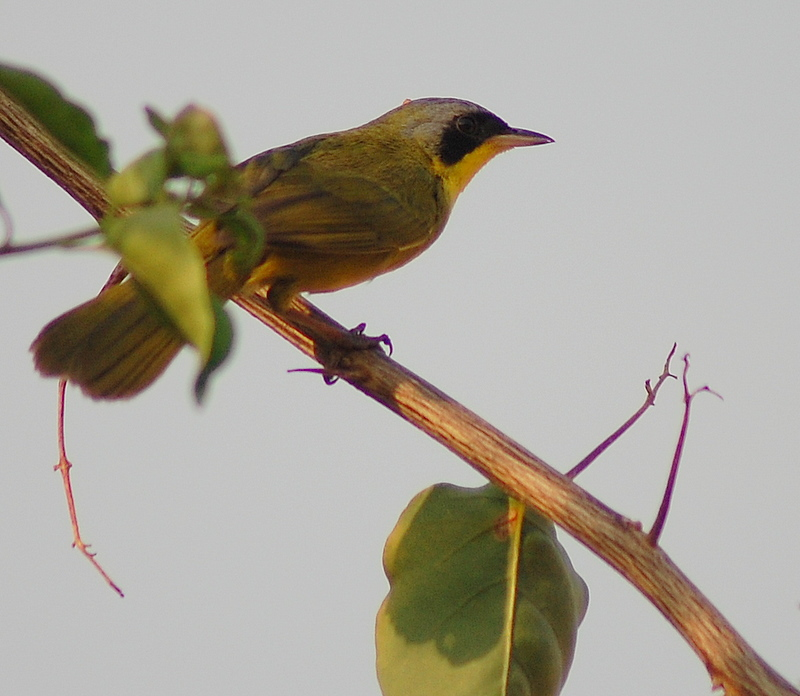
Masked yellowthroat

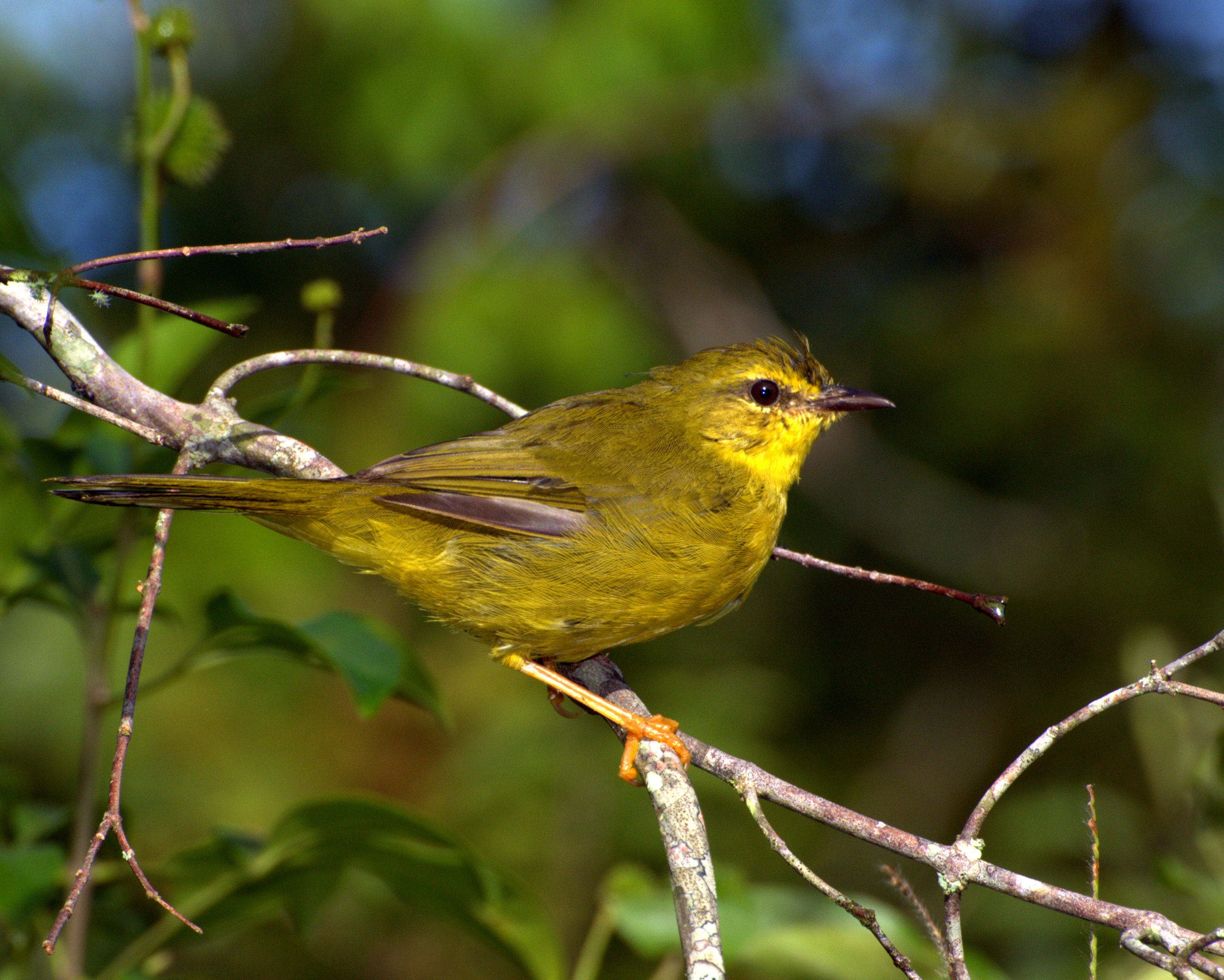
Flavescent warbler

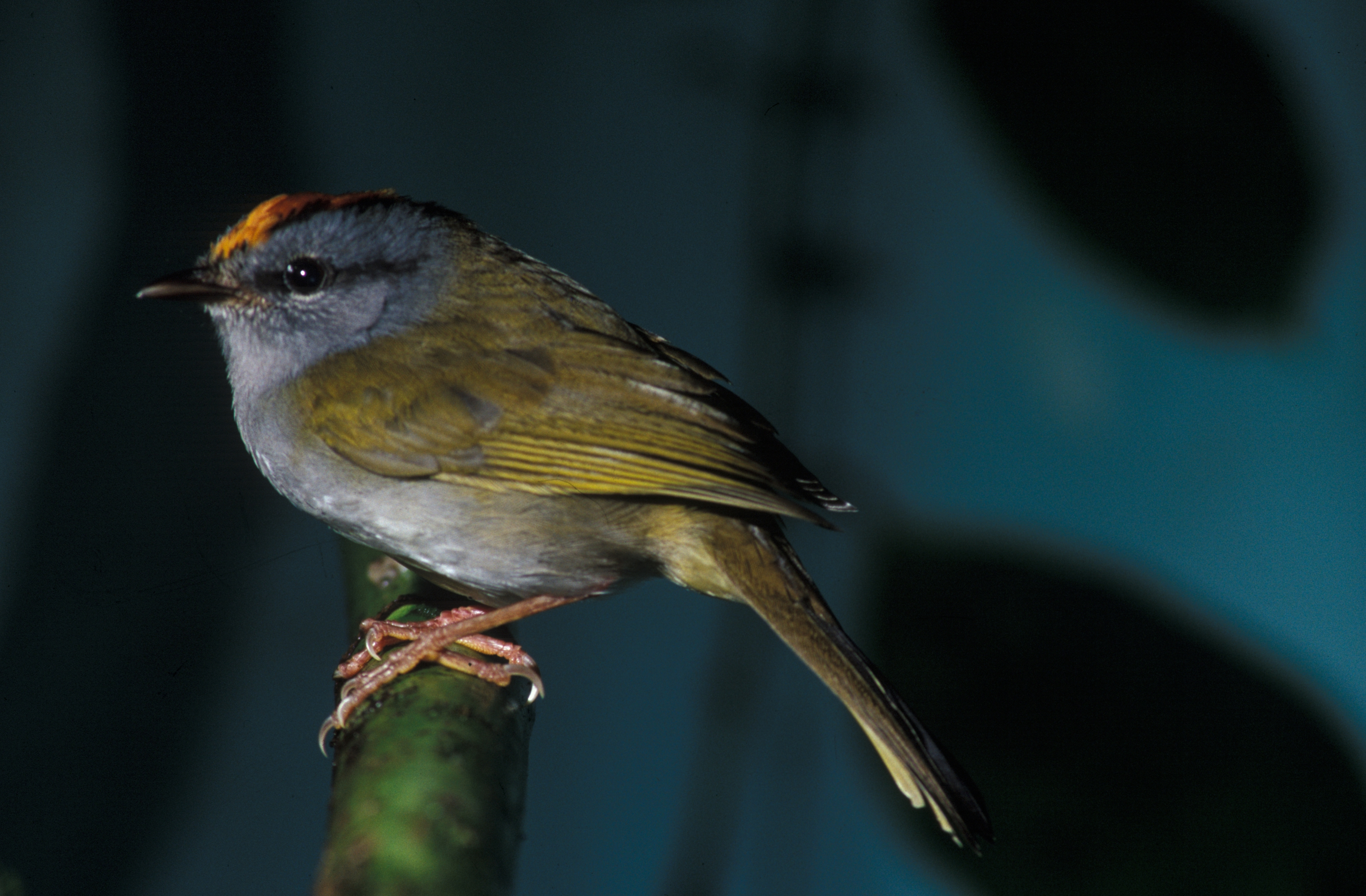
Russet-crowned warbler

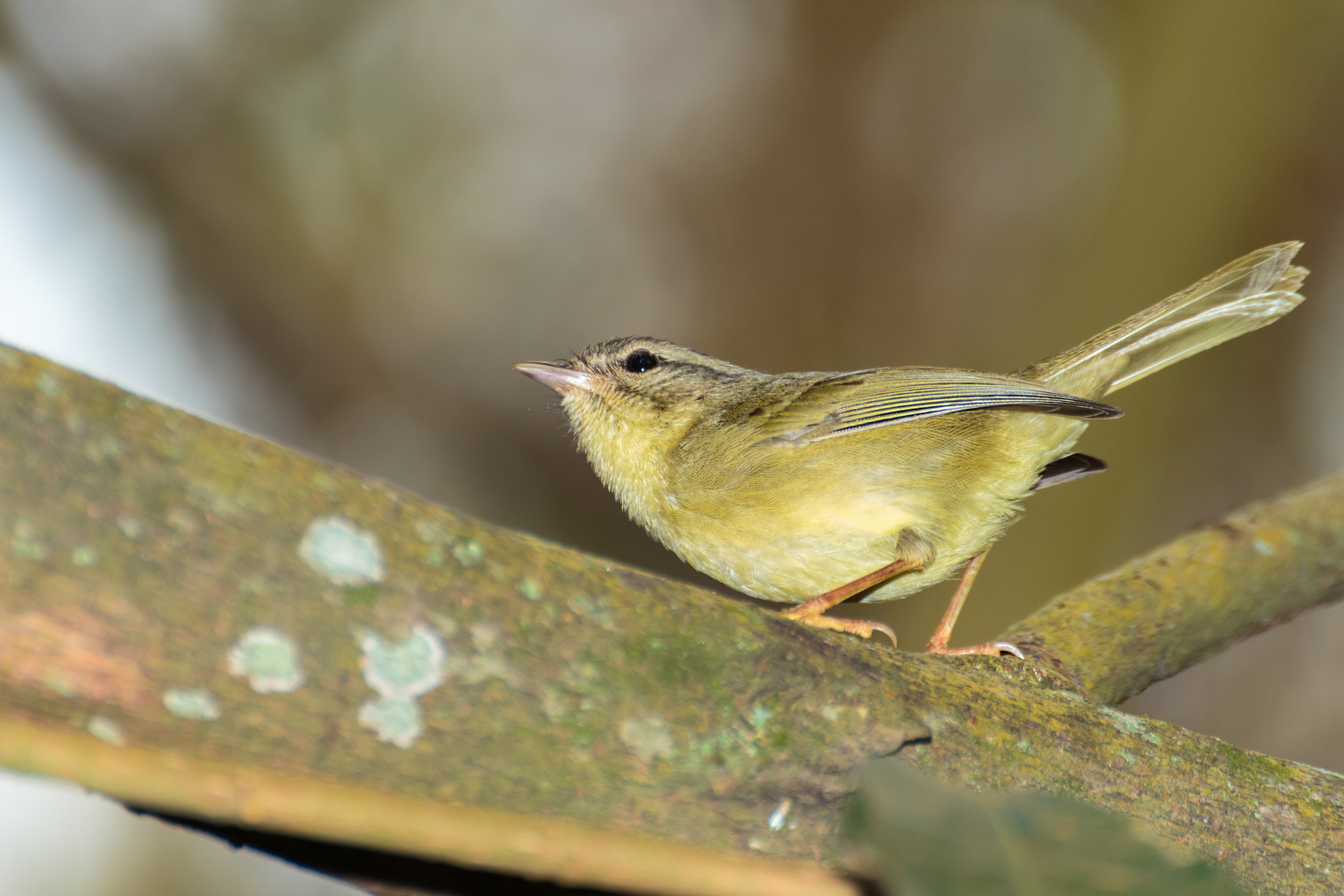
Three-striped warbler

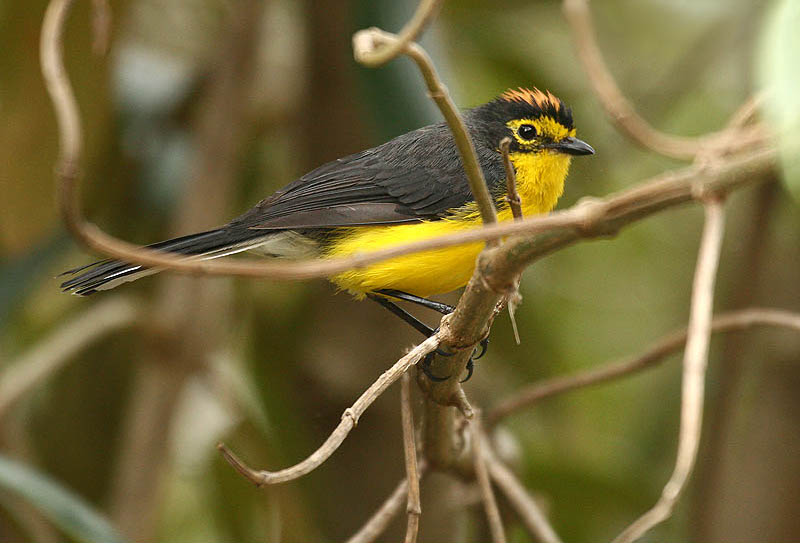
Spectacled whitestart
- Ovenbird, Seiurus aurocapilla
- Worm-eating warbler, Helmitheros vermivorum (V)
- Northern waterthrush, Parkesia noveboracensis
- Louisiana waterthrush, Parkesia motacilla
- Golden-winged warbler, Vermivora chrysoptera
- Blue-winged warbler, Vermivora cyanoptera (V)
- Black-and-white warbler, Mniotilta varia
- Prothonotary warbler, Protonotaria citrea
- Tennessee warbler, Leiothlypis peregrina
- Connecticut warbler, Oporornis agilis
- Masked yellowthroat, Geothlypis aequinoctialis (E-SA)
- Mourning warbler, Geothlypis philadelphia
- Kentucky warbler, Geothlypis formosa
- Olive-crowned yellowthroat, Geothlypis semiflava
- Common yellowthroat, Geothlypis trichas
- Hooded warbler, Setophaga citrina
- American redstart, Setophaga ruticilla
- Cape May warbler, Setophaga tigrina
- Cerulean warbler, Setophaga cerulea
- Northern parula, Setophaga americana
- Tropical parula, Setophaga pitiayumi
- Magnolia warbler, Setophaga magnolia (V)
- Bay-breasted warbler, Setophaga castanea
- Blackburnian warbler, Setophaga fusca
- Yellow warbler, Setophaga petechia
- Chestnut-sided warbler, Setophaga pensylvanica (V)
- Blackpoll warbler, Setophaga striata
- Black-throated blue warbler, Setophaga caerulescens
- Palm warbler, Setophaga palmarum
- Yellow-rumped warbler, Setophaga coronata (V)
- Yellow-throated warbler, Setophaga dominica (V)
- Prairie warbler, Setophaga discolor (V)
- Townsend's warbler, Setophaga townsendi (V)
- Black-throated green warbler, Setophaga virens
- Citrine warbler, Myiothlypis luteoviridis (E-SA)
- Santa Marta warbler, Myiothlypis basilica (E-CO)
- White-striped warbler, Myiothlypis leucophrys (E-BR)
- Flavescent warbler, Myiothlypis flaveola (E-SA)
- White-browed warbler, Myiothlypis leucoblephara (E-SA)
- Black-crested warbler, Myiothlypis nigrocristata (E-SA)
- Pale-legged warbler, Myiothlypis signata (E-SA)
- Buff-rumped warbler, Myiothlypis fulvicauda
- Riverbank warbler, Myiothlypis rivularis (E-SA)
- Two-banded warbler, Myiothlypis bivittata (E-SA)
- Golden-bellied warbler, Myiothlypis chrysogaster (E-SA)
- White-lored warbler, Myiothlypis conspicillata (E-CO)
- Gray-throated warbler, Myiothlypis cinereicollis (E-SA)
- Gray-and-gold warbler, Myiothlypis fraseri (E-SA)
- Russet-crowned warbler, Myiothlypis coronata (E-SA)
- Chestnut-capped warbler, Basileuterus delattrii
- Golden-crowned warbler, Basileuterus culicivorus
- Pirre warbler, Basileuterus ignotus
- Three-striped warbler, Basileuterus tristriatus (E-SA)
- Three-banded warbler, Basileuterus trifasciatus (E-SA)
- Gray-headed warbler, Basileuterus griseiceps (E-VE)
- Canada warbler, Cardellina canadensis
- Wilson's warbler, Cardellina pusilla (V)
- Slate-throated whitestart, Myioborus miniatus
- Brown-capped whitestart, Myioborus brunniceps (E-SA)
- Yellow-crowned whitestart, Myioborus flavivertex (E-CO)
- White-fronted whitestart, Myioborus albifrons (E-VE)
- Golden-fronted whitestart, Myioborus ornatus (E-SA)
- Spectacled whitestart, Myioborus melanocephalus (E-SA)
- Paria whitestart, Myioborus pariae (E-VE)
- White-faced whitestart, Myioborus albifacies (E-VE)
- Saffron-breasted whitestart, Myioborus cardonai (E-VE)
- Tepui whitestart, Myioborus castaneocapilla (E-SA)

== Mitrospingids ==
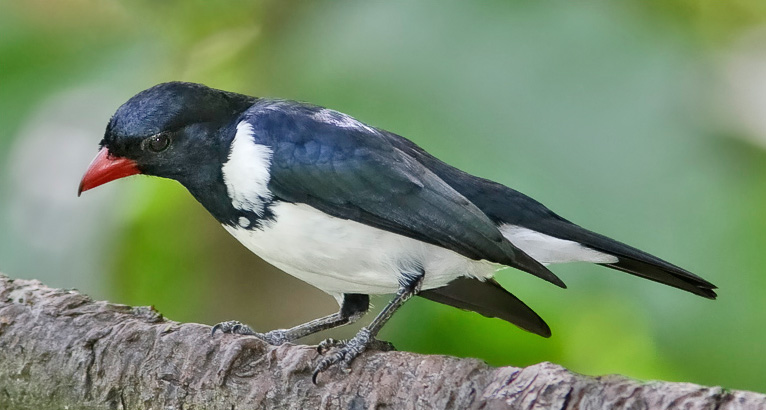
Red-billed pied tanager

Order: Passeriformes Family: Mitrospingidae

Until 2017 the four species in this family were included in the family Thraupidae, the "true" tanagers.

- Dusky-faced tanager, Mitrospingus cassinii
- Olive-backed tanager, Mitrospingus oleagineus (E-SA)
- Red-billed pied tanager, Lamprospiza melanoleuca (E-SA)
- Olive-green tanager, Orthogonys chloricterus (E-BR)

== Cardinal grosbeaks ==
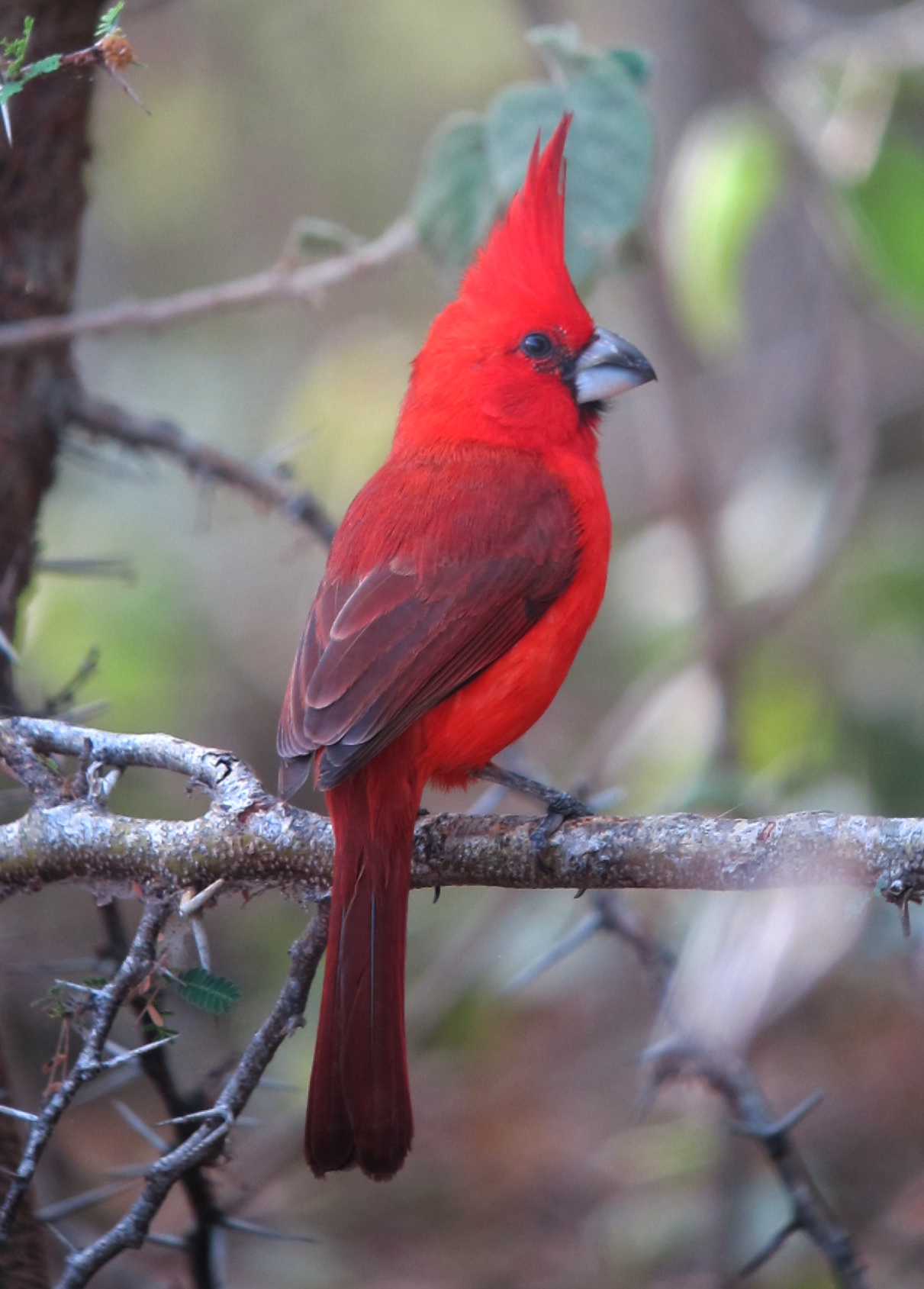
Vermilion cardinal

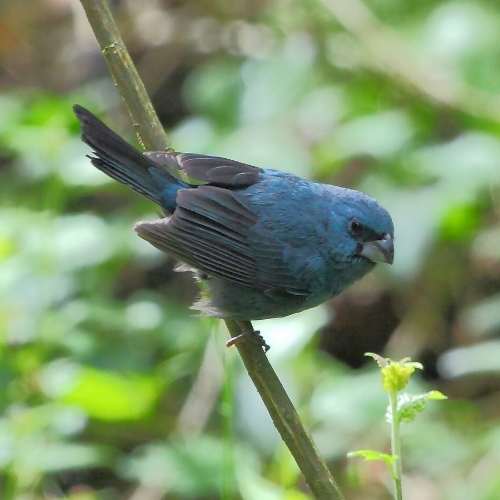
Glaucous-blue grosbeak

Order: Passeriformes Family: Cardinalidae

The cardinals are a family of robust, seed-eating birds with strong bills. They are typically associated with open woodland. The sexes usually have distinct plumages.

- Hepatic tanager, Piranga flava
- Summer tanager, Piranga rubra
- Scarlet tanager, Piranga olivacea
- Western tanager, Piranga ludoviciana (V)
- Red-hooded tanager, Piranga rubriceps (E-SA)
- White-winged tanager, Piranga leucoptera
- Red-throated ant-tanager, Driophlox fuscicauda
- Sooty ant-tanager, Driophlox gutturalis (E-CO)
- Crested ant-tanager, Driophlox cristata (E-CO)
- Red-crowned ant-tanager, Habia rubica
- Ochre-breasted tanager, Chlorothraupis stolzmanni (E-SA)
- Carmiol's tanager, Chlorothraupis carmioli
- Lemon-spectacled tanager, Chlorothraupis olivacea
- Yellow-lored tanager, Chlorothraupis frenata (E-SA)
- Golden grosbeak, Pheucticus chrysogaster (E-SA)
- Black-backed grosbeak, Pheucticus aureoventris
- Rose-breasted grosbeak, Pheucticus ludovicianus
- Rose-breasted chat, Granatellus pelzelni (E-SA)
- Vermilion cardinal, Cardinalis phoeniceus (E-SA)
- Red-and-black grosbeak, Periporphyrus erythromelas (E-SA)
- Yellow-green grosbeak, Caryothraustes canadensis
- Ecuadorian seedeater, Amaurospiza aequatorialis (E-SA)
- Carrizal seedeater, Amaurospiza carrizalensis (E-VE)
- Blackish-blue seedeater, Amaurospiza moesta (E-SA)
- Glaucous-blue grosbeak, Cyanoloxia glaucocaerulea (E-SA)
- Blue-black grosbeak, Cyanoloxia cyanoides
- Amazonian grosbeak, Cyanoloxia rothschildii
- Ultramarine grosbeak, Cyanoloxia brissonii (E-SA)
- Blue grosbeak, Passerina caerulea (V)
- Indigo bunting, Passerina cyanea
- Dickcissel, Spiza americana

== Tanagers ==
Order: Passeriformes Family: Thraupidae

The tanagers are a large group of small to medium-sized passerine birds restricted to the New World, mainly in the tropics. Many species are brightly colored. As a family they are omnivorous, but individual species specialize in eating fruits, seeds, insects, or other types of food. Most have short, rounded wings.

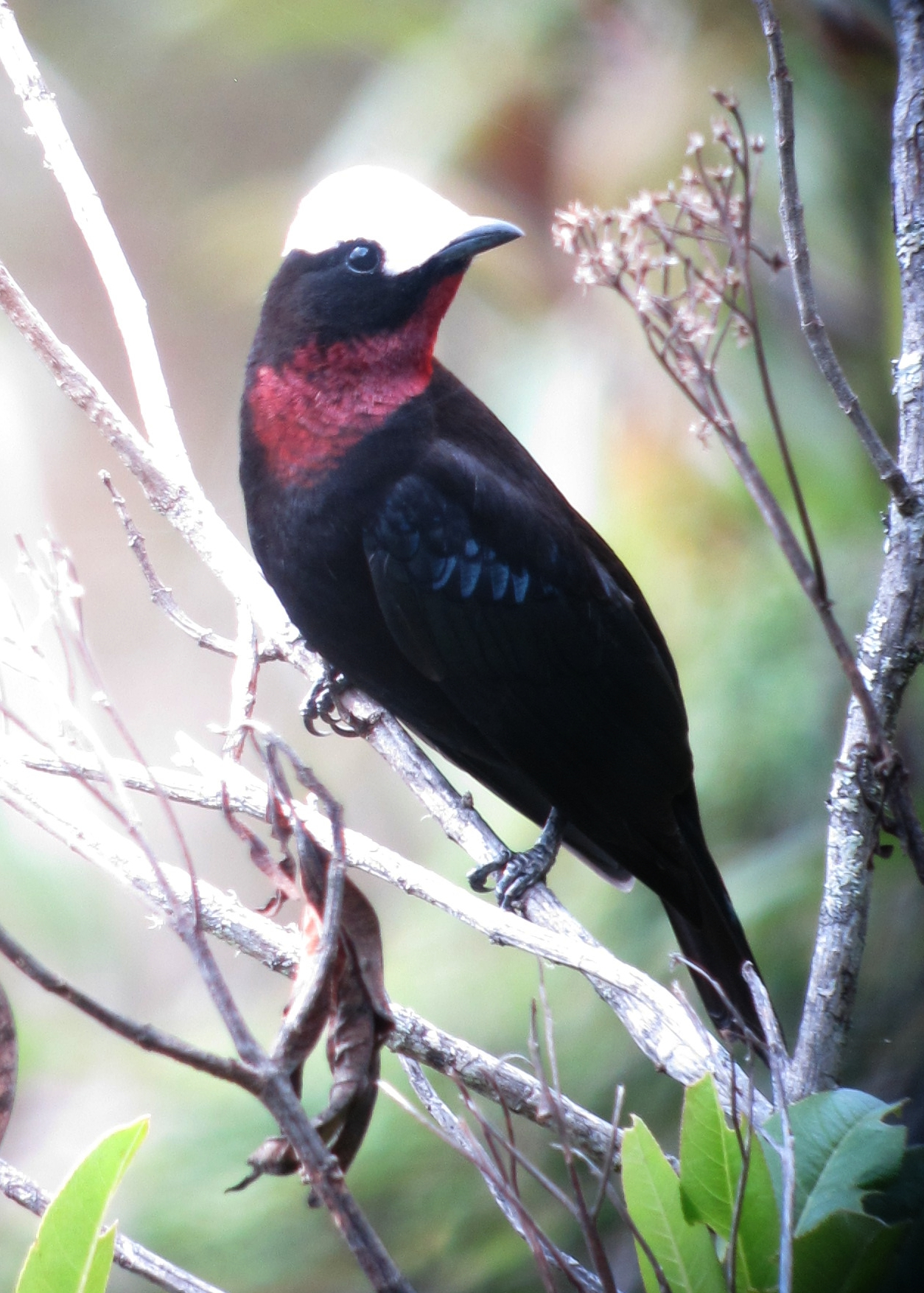
White-capped tanager

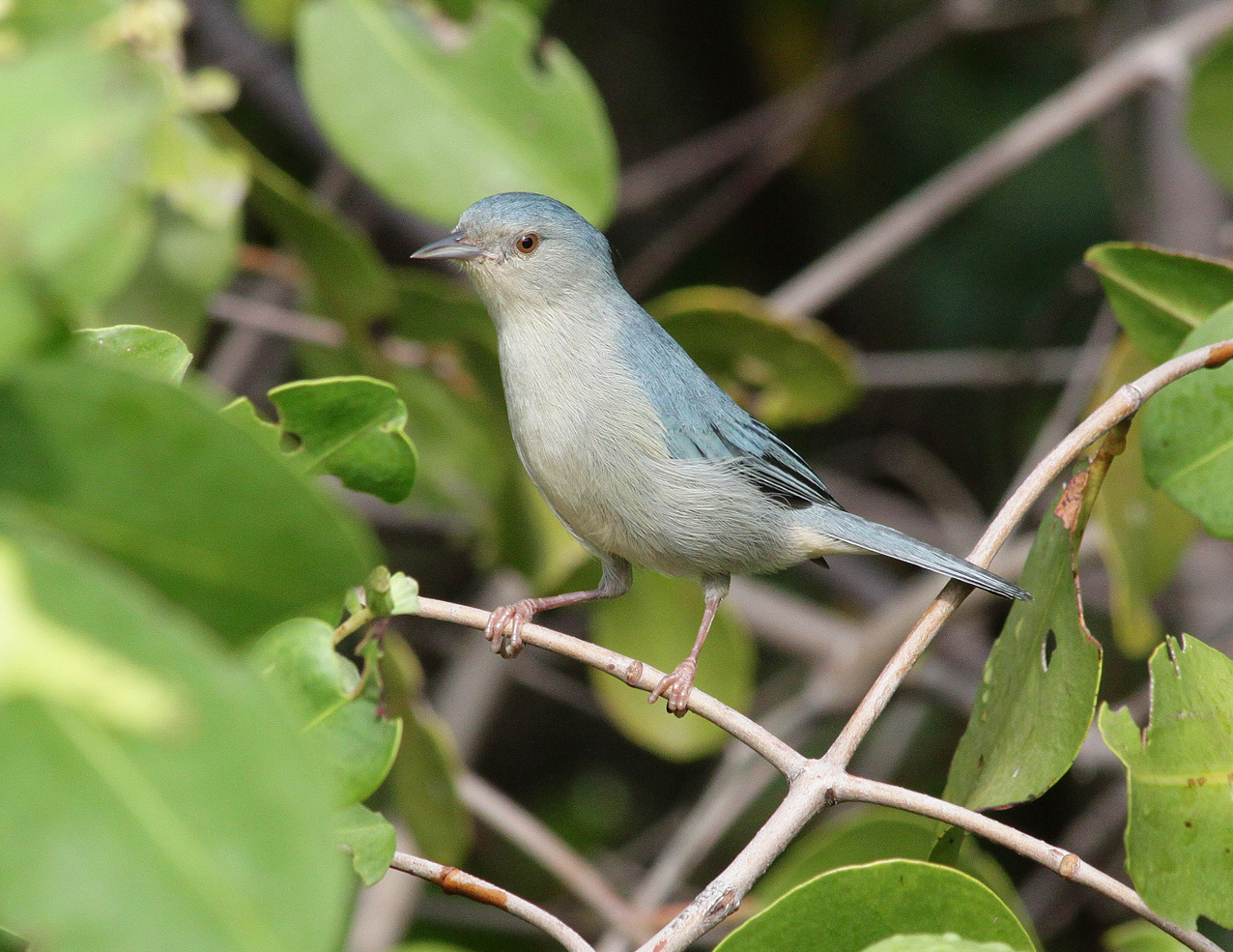
Bicolored conebill

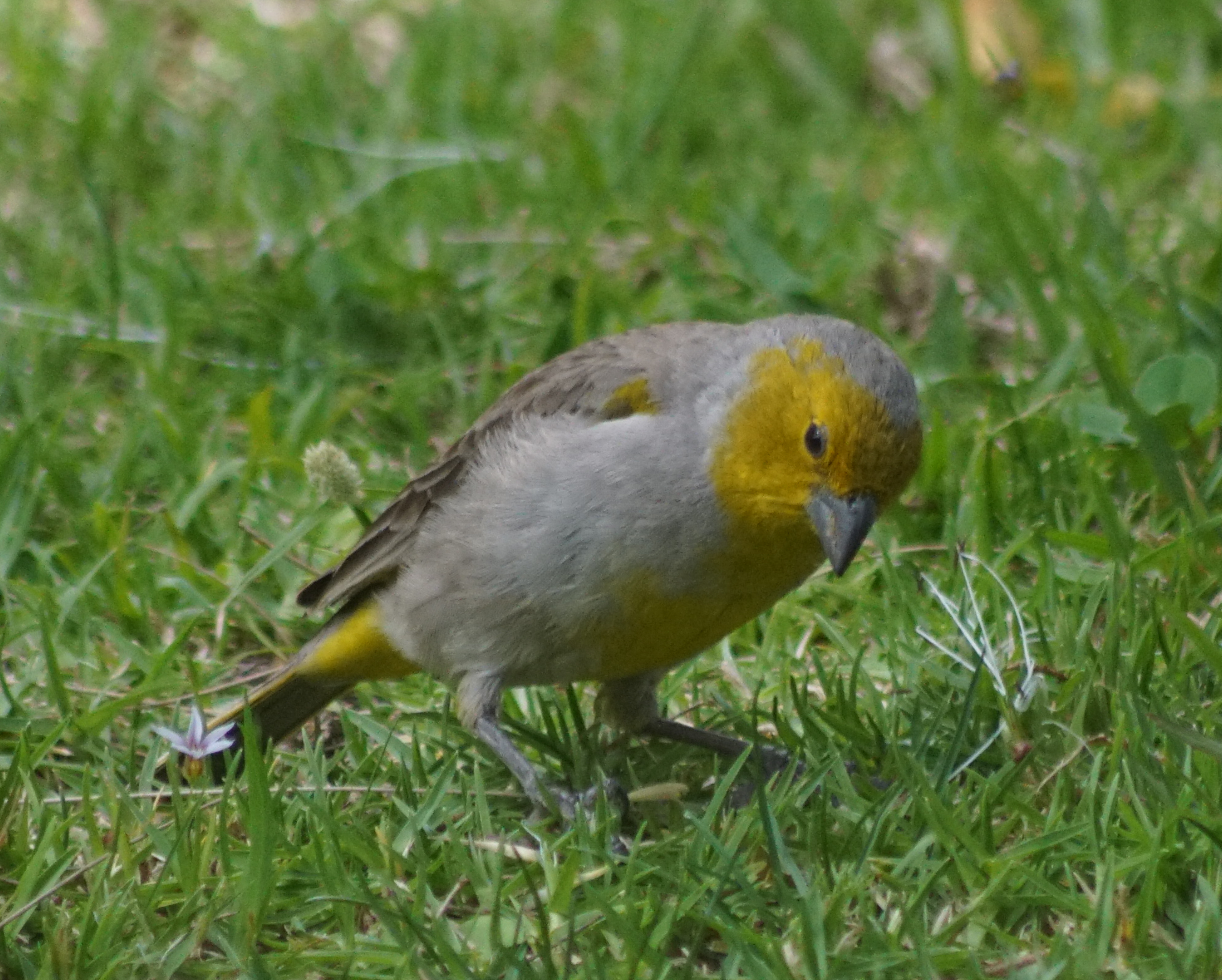
Citron-headed yellow-finch

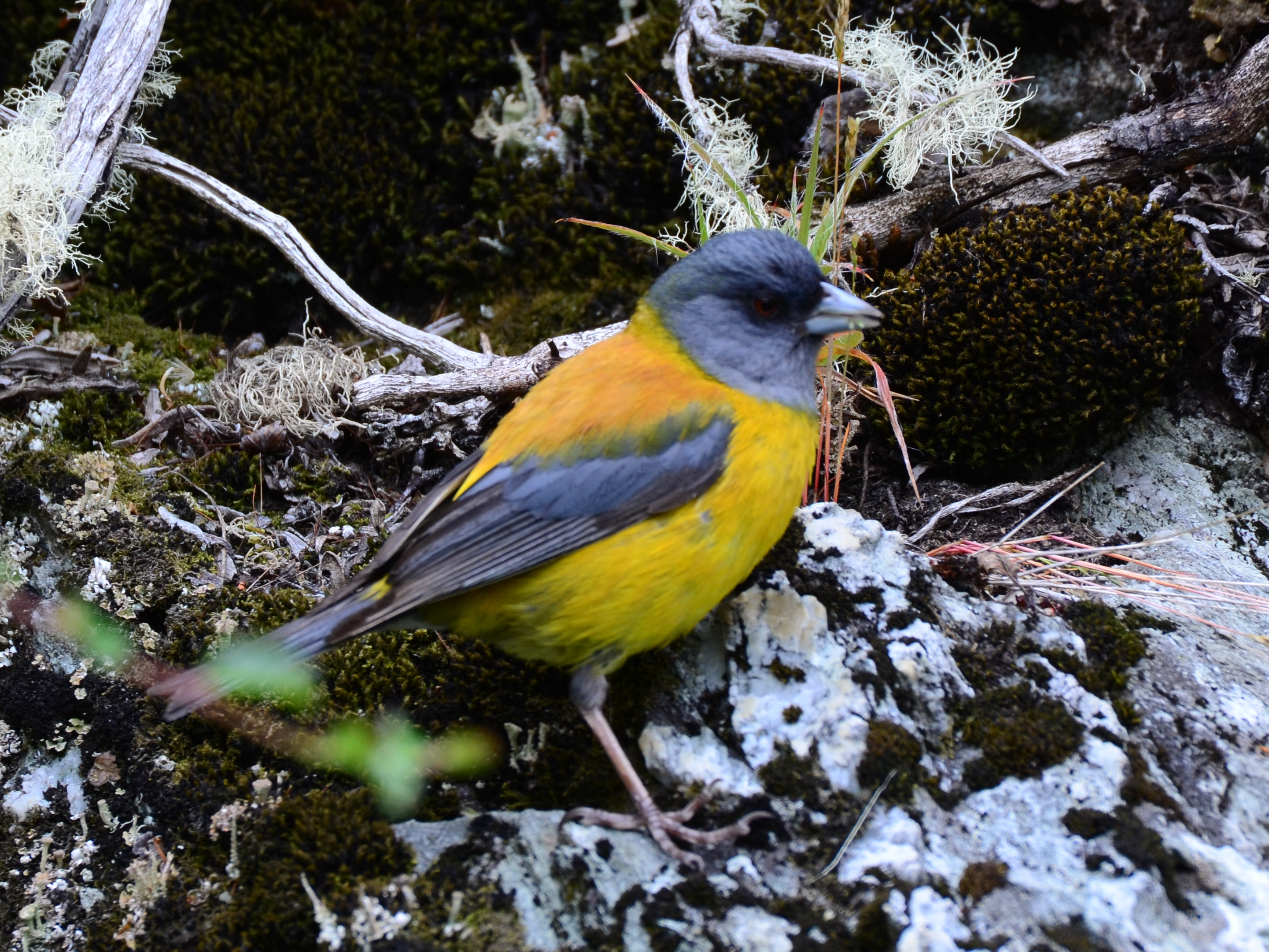
Patagonian sierra-finch

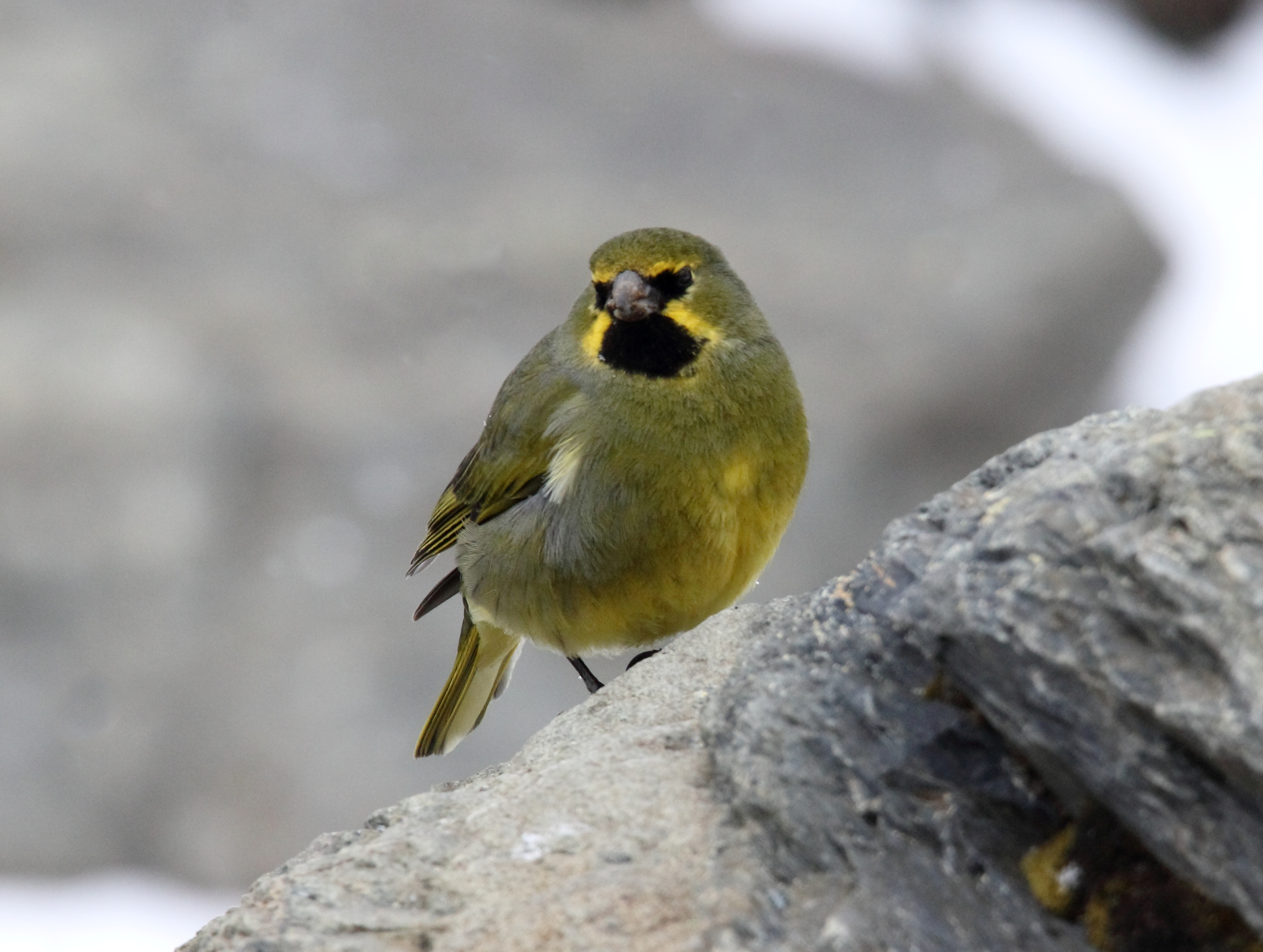
Yellow-bridled finch

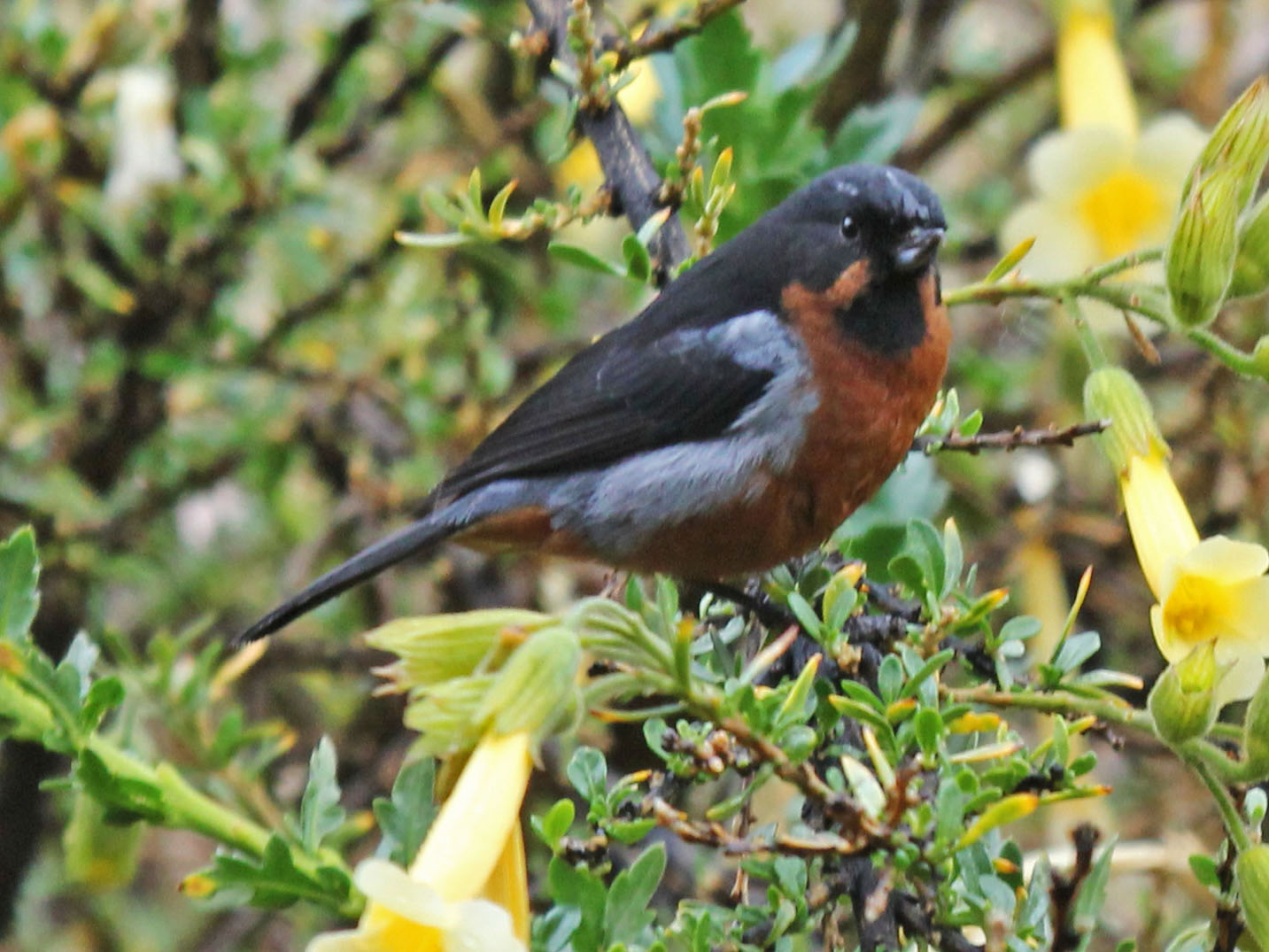
Black-throated flowerpiercer

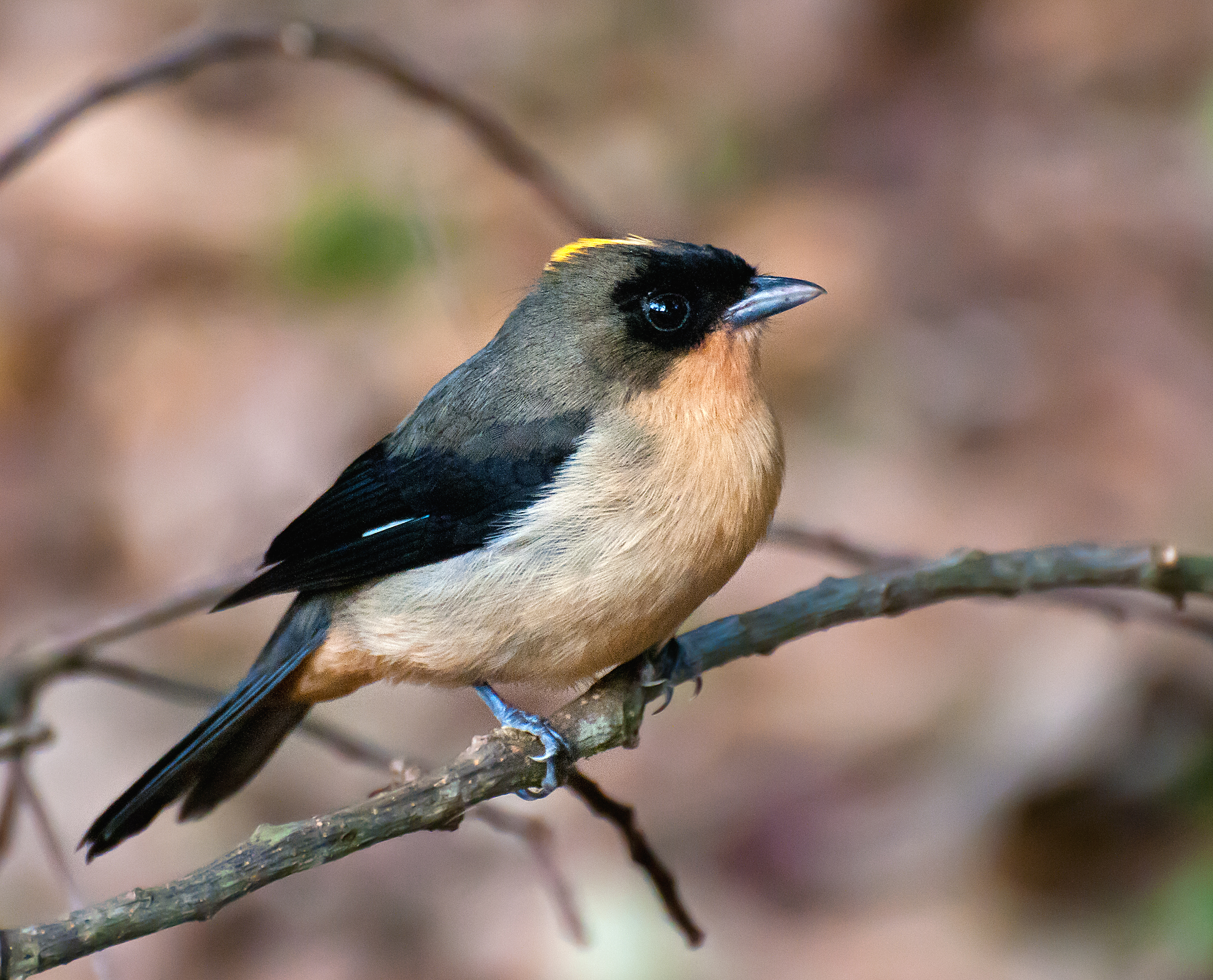
Black-goggled tanager

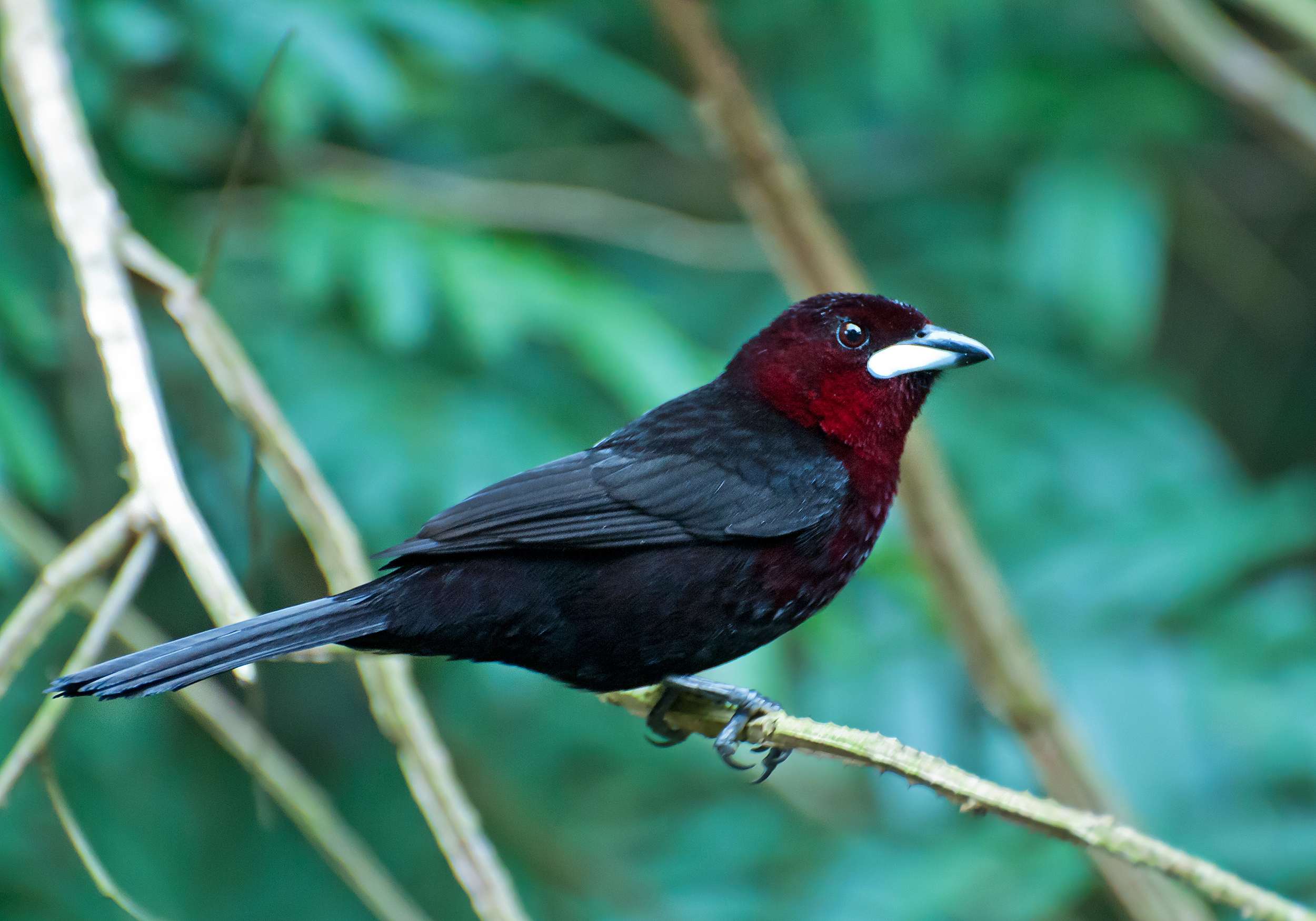
Silver-beaked tanager

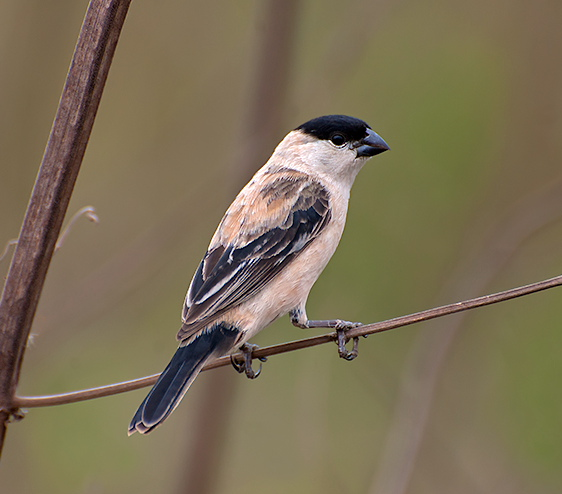
Pearly-bellied seedeater

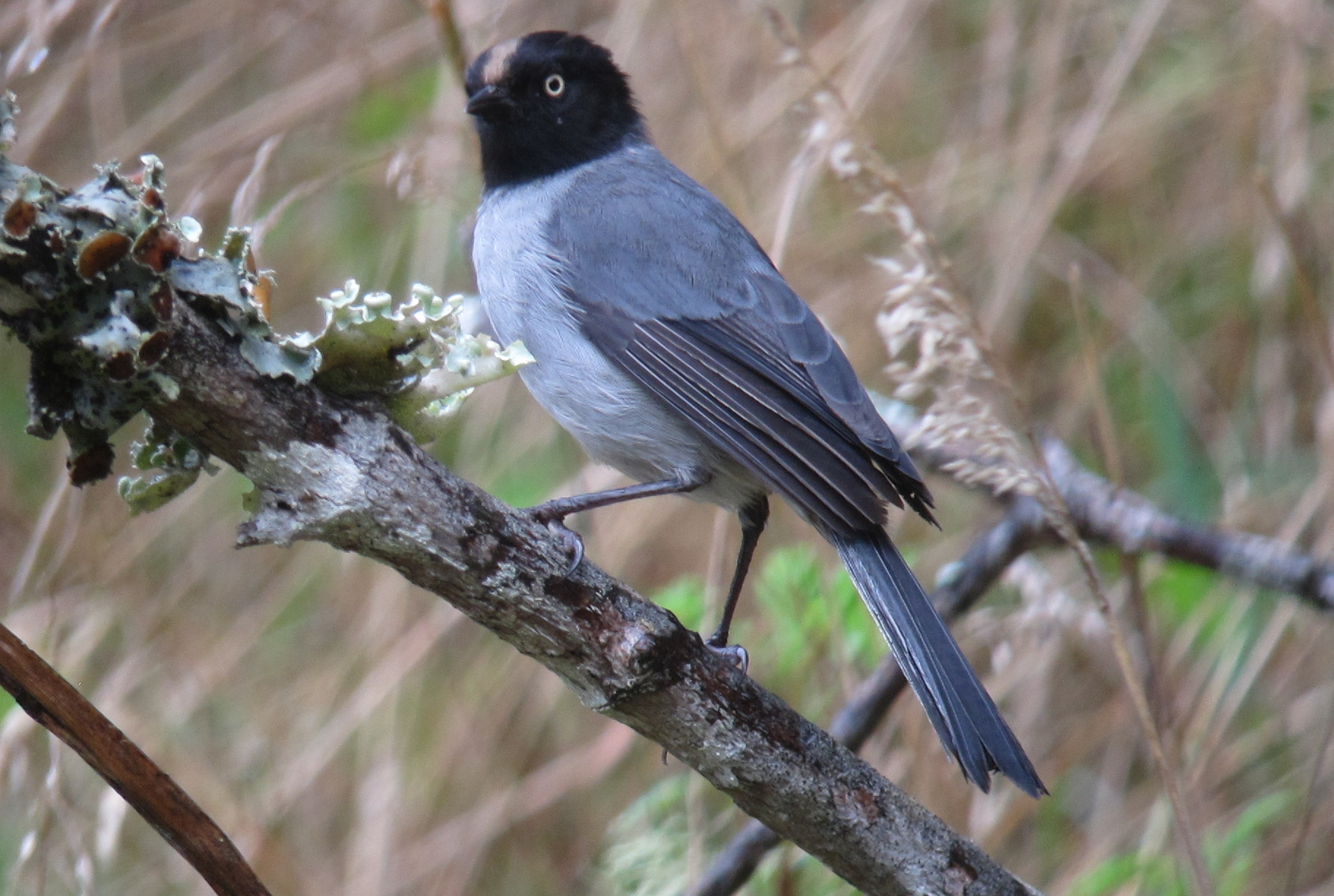
Black-headed hemispingus

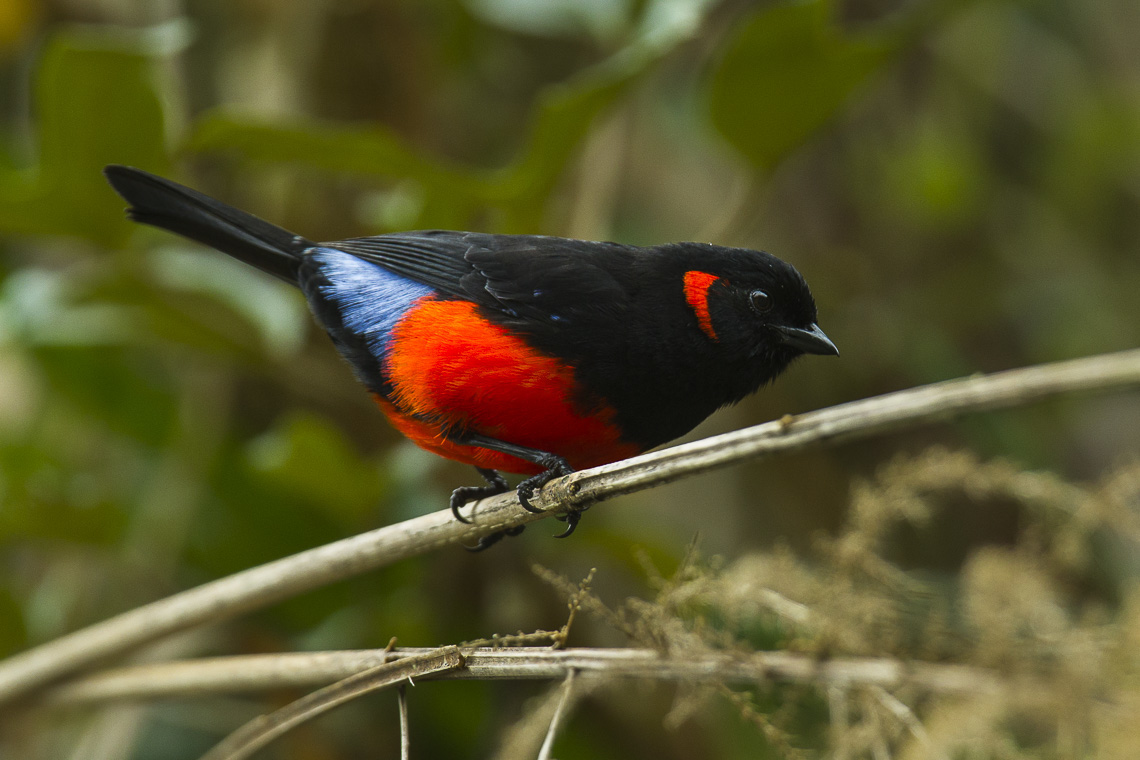
Scarlet-bellied mountain tanager

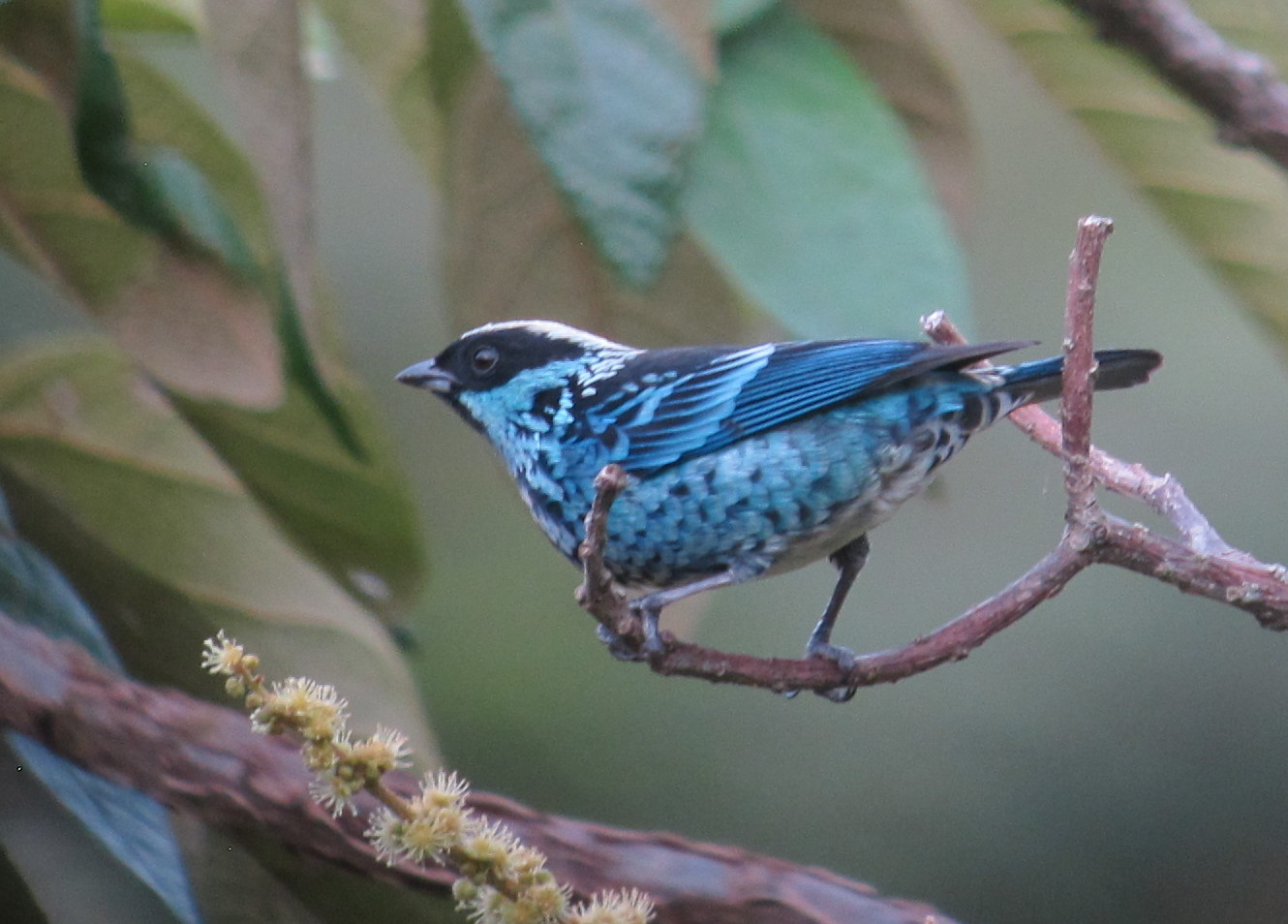
Beryl-spangled tanager

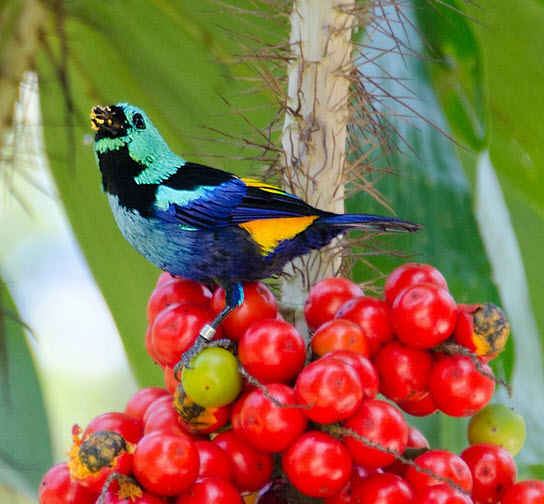
Seven-colored tanager

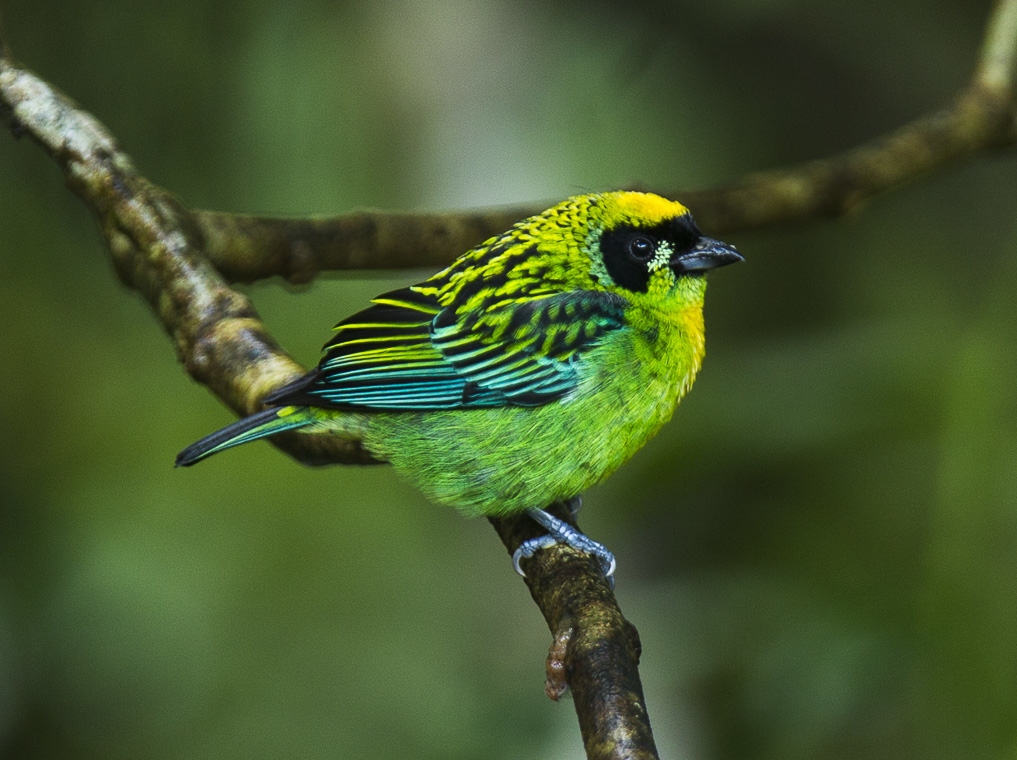
Green-and-gold tanager

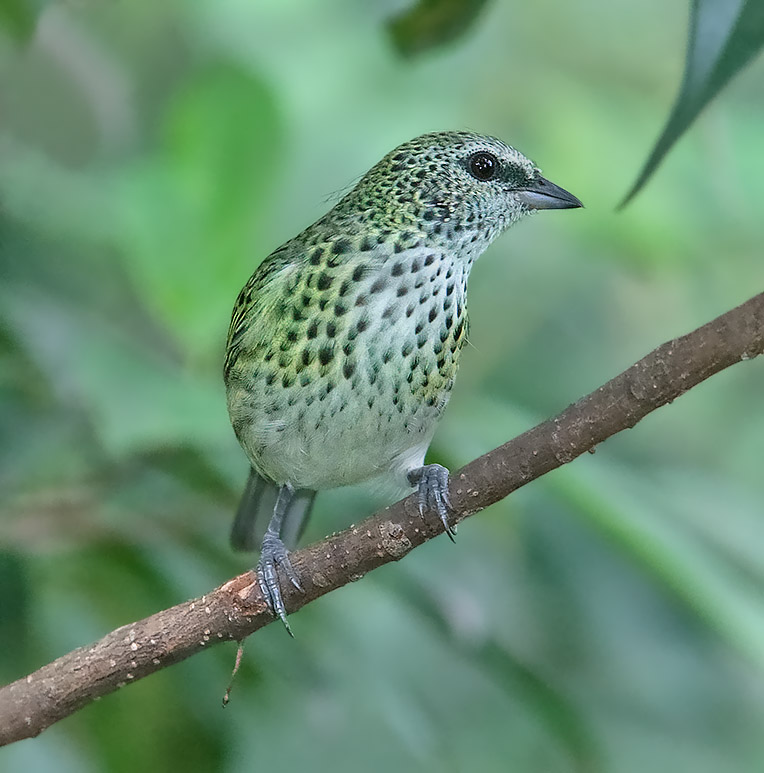
Spotted tanager
- Blue-backed tanager, Cyanicterus cyanicterus (E-SA)
- Hooded tanager, Nemosia pileata (E-SA)
- Cherry-throated tanager, Nemosia rourei (E-BR)
- Scarlet-throated tanager, Compsothraupis loricata (E-BR)
- White-capped tanager, Sericossypha albocristata (E-SA)
- Brown tanager, Orchesticus abeillei (E-BR)
- Yellow-shouldered grosbeak, Parkerthraustes humeralis (E-SA)
- Plushcap, Catamblyrhynchus diadema (E-SA)
- Green honeycreeper, Chlorophanes spiza
- Golden-collared honeycreeper, Iridophanes pulcherrimus (E-SA)
- Black-and-yellow tanager, Chrysothlypis chrysomelas
- Scarlet-and-white tanager, Chrysothlypis salmoni (E-SA)
- Scarlet-browed tanager, Heterospingus xanthopygius
- Guira tanager, Hemithraupis guira (E-SA)
- Rufous-headed tanager, Hemithraupis ruficapilla (E-BR)
- Yellow-backed tanager, Hemithraupis flavicollis
- Bicolored conebill, Conirostrum bicolor (E-SA)
- Pearly-breasted conebill, Conirostrum margaritae (E-SA)
- Chestnut-vented conebill, Conirostrum speciosum (E-SA)
- White-eared conebill, Conirostrum leucogenys
- Giant conebill, Conirostrum binghami (E-SA)
- White-browed conebill, Conirostrum ferrugineiventre (E-SA)
- Blue-backed conebill, Conirostrum sitticolor (E-SA)
- Capped conebill, Conirostrum albifrons (E-SA)
- Tamarugo conebill, Conirostrum tamarugense (E-SA)
- Rufous-browed conebill, Conirostrum rufum (E-SA)
- Cinereous conebill, Conirostrum cinereum (E-SA)
- Stripe-tailed yellow-finch, Sicalis citrina (E-SA)
- Puna yellow-finch, Sicalis lutea (E-SA)
- Bright-rumped yellow-finch, Sicalis uropygialis (E-SA)
- Citron-headed yellow-finch, Sicalis luteocephala (E-SA)
- Greater yellow-finch, Sicalis auriventris (E-SA)
- Greenish yellow-finch, Sicalis olivascens (E-SA)
- Monte yellow-finch, Sicalis mendozae (E-AR)
- Patagonian yellow-finch, Sicalis lebruni (E-SA)
- Orange-fronted yellow-finch, Sicalis columbiana (E-SA)
- Saffron finch, Sicalis flaveola (E-SA)
- Grassland yellow-finch, Sicalis luteola
- Raimondi's yellow-finch, Sicalis raimondii (E-SA)
- Sulphur-throated finch, Sicalis taczanowskii (E-SA)
- Black-hooded sierra finch, Phrygilus atriceps (E-SA)
- Peruvian sierra finch, Phrygilus punensis (E-SA)
- Gray-hooded sierra finch, Phrygilus gayi (E-SA)
- Patagonian sierra finch, Phrygilus patagonicus (E-SA)
- Plumbeous sierra finch, Geospizopsis unicolor (E-SA)
- Ash-breasted sierra finch, Geospizopsis plebejus (E-SA)
- Mourning sierra finch, Rhopospina fruticeti (E-SA)
- Band-tailed sierra finch, Rhopospina alaudina (E-SA)
- Carbonated sierra finch, Rhopospina carbonaria (E-AR)
- Blue finch, Rhopospina caerulescens (E-SA)
- Red-backed sierra finch, Idiopsar dorsalis (E-SA)
- White-throated sierra finch, Idiopsar erythronotus (E-SA)
- Glacier finch, Idiopsar speculifer (E-SA)
- Boulder finch, Idiopsar brachyurus (E-SA)
- White-bridled finch, Melanodera melanodera (E-SA)
- Yellow-bridled finch, Melanodera xanthogramma (E-SA)
- Band-tailed seedeater, Catamenia analis (E-SA)
- Plain-colored seedeater, Catamenia inornata (E-SA)
- Paramo seedeater, Catamenia homochroa (E-SA)
- Chestnut-bellied flowerpiercer, Diglossa gloriosissima (E-CO)
- Glossy flowerpiercer, Diglossa lafresnayii (E-SA)
- Moustached flowerpiercer, Diglossa mystacalis (E-SA)
- Merida flowerpiercer, Diglossa gloriosa (E-VE)
- Black flowerpiercer, Diglossa humeralis (E-SA)
- Black-throated flowerpiercer, Diglossa brunneiventris (E-SA)
- Gray-bellied flowerpiercer, Diglossa carbonaria (E-BO)
- Venezuelan flowerpiercer, Diglossa venezuelensis (E-VE)
- White-sided flowerpiercer, Diglossa albilatera (E-SA)
- Scaled flowerpiercer, Diglossa duidae (E-SA)
- Greater flowerpiercer, Diglossa major (E-SA)
- Indigo flowerpiercer, Diglossa indigotica (E-SA)
- Rusty flowerpiercer, Diglossa sittoides (E-SA)
- Deep-blue flowerpiercer, Diglossa glauca (E-SA)
- Bluish flowerpiercer, Diglossa caerulescens (E-SA)
- Warbling masked-flowerpiercer, Diglossa cyanea (E-SA)
- Whistling masked-flowerpiercer, Diglossa melanopis (E-SA)
- Tit-like dacnis, Xenodacnis parina (E-SA)
- Slaty finch, Haplospiza rustica
- Uniform finch, Haplospiza unicolor (E-SA)
- Blue-black grassquit, Volatinia jacarina
- Black-and-white tanager, Conothraupis speculigera (E-SA)
- Cone-billed tanager, Conothraupis mesoleuca (E-BR)
- Rufous-crested tanager, Creurgops verticalis (E-SA)
- Slaty tanager, Creurgops dentatus (E-SA)
- Flame-crested tanager, Loriotus cristatus (E-SA)
- Yellow-crested tanager, Loriotus rufiventer (E-SA)
- White-shouldered tanager, Loriotus luctuosus
- Fulvous-crested tanager, Tachyphonus surinamus (E-SA)
- Tawny-crested tanager, Tachyphonus delatrii
- Ruby-crowned tanager, Tachyphonus coronatus (E-SA)
- White-lined tanager, Tachyphonus rufus
- Red-shouldered tanager, Tachyphonus phoenicius (E-SA)
- Gray-headed tanager, Eucometis penicillata
- Black-goggled tanager, Trichothraupis melanops (E-SA)
- Inti tanager, Heliothraupis oneilli (E-SA)
- Pileated finch, Coryphospingus pileatus (E-SA)
- Red-crested finch, Coryphospingus cucullatus (E-SA)
- Masked crimson tanager, Ramphocelus nigrogularis (E-SA)
- Crimson-backed tanager, Ramphocelus dimidiatus
- Black-bellied tanager, Ramphocelus melanogaster (E-PE)
- Silver-beaked tanager, Ramphocelus carbo (E-SA)
- Brazilian tanager, Ramphocelus bresilius (E-BR)
- Flame-rumped tanager, Ramphocelus flammigerus (E-SA)
- Fulvous shrike-tanager, Lanio fulvus (E-SA)
- White-winged shrike-tanager, Lanio versicolor (E-SA)
- Crimson-breasted finch, Rhodospingus cruentus (E-SA)
- Coal-crested finch, Charitospiza eucosma (E-SA)
- Short-billed honeycreeper, Cyanerpes nitidus (E-SA)
- Shining honeycreeper, Cyanerpes lucidus
- Purple honeycreeper, Cyanerpes caeruleus
- Red-legged honeycreeper, Cyanerpes cyaneus
- Swallow tanager, Tersina viridis
- White-bellied dacnis, Dacnis albiventris (E-SA)
- Yellow-tufted dacnis, Dacnis egregia (E-SA)
- Black-faced dacnis, Dacnis lineata (E-SA)
- Yellow-bellied dacnis, Dacnis flaviventer (E-SA)
- Turquoise dacnis, Dacnis hartlaubi (E-CO)
- Black-legged dacnis, Dacnis nigripes (E-BR)
- Scarlet-thighed dacnis, Dacnis venusta
- Blue dacnis, Dacnis cayana
- Viridian dacnis, Dacnis viguieri
- Scarlet-breasted dacnis, Dacnis berlepschi (E-SA)
- Lesson's seedeater, Sporophila bouvronides (E-SA)
- Lined seedeater, Sporophila lineola (E-SA)
- White-bellied seedeater, Sporophila leucoptera (E-SA)
- Parrot-billed seedeater, Sporophila peruviana (E-SA)
- Chestnut-throated seedeater, Sporophila telasco (E-SA)
- Drab seedeater, Sporophila simplex (E-SA)
- Chestnut-bellied seedeater, Sporophila castaneiventris (E-SA)
- Ruddy-breasted seedeater, Sporophila minuta
- Black-and-tawny seedeater, Sporophila nigrorufa (E-SA)
- Copper seedeater, Sporophila bouvreuil (E-SA)
- Pearly-bellied seedeater, Sporophila pileata (E-SA)
- Tawny-bellied seedeater, Sporophila hypoxantha (E-SA)
- Ibera seedeater, Sporophila iberaensis (E-SA)
- Dark-throated seedeater, Sporophila ruficollis (E-SA)
- Marsh seedeater, Sporophila palustris (E-SA)
- Rufous-rumped seedeater, Sporophila hypochroma (E-SA)
- Chestnut seedeater, Sporophila cinnamomea (E-SA)
- Black-bellied seedeater, Sporophila melanogaster (E-BR)
- Thick-billed seed-finch, Sporophila funerea
- Chestnut-bellied seed-finch, Sporophila angolensis (E-SA)
- Great-billed seed-finch, Sporophila maximiliani (E-SA)
- Large-billed seed-finch, Sporophila crassirostris (E-SA)
- Black-billed seed-finch, Sporophila atrirostris (E-SA)
- Variable seedeater, Sporophila corvina
- Gray seedeater, Sporophila intermedia (E-SA)
- Wing-barred seedeater, Sporophila americana (E-SA)
- White-naped seedeater, Sporophila fringilloides (E-SA)
- Black-and-white seedeater, Sporophila luctuosa (E-SA)
- Yellow-bellied seedeater, Sporophila nigricollis
- Dubois's seedeater, Sporophila ardesiaca (E-BR)
- Double-collared seedeater, Sporophila caerulescens (E-SA)
- Slate-colored seedeater, Sporophila schistacea
- Temminck's seedeater, Sporophila falcirostris (E-SA)
- Buffy-fronted seedeater, Sporophila frontalis (E-BR)
- Plumbeous seedeater, Sporophila plumbea (E-SA)
- Tropeiro seedeater, Sporophila beltoni (E-BR)
- Rusty-collared seedeater, Sporophila collaris (E-SA)
- White-throated seedeater, Sporophila albogularis (E-BR)
- Many-colored chaco finch, Saltatricula multicolor (E-SA)
- Black-throated saltator, Saltatricula atricollis (E-SA)
- Buff-throated saltator, Saltator maximus
- Black-winged saltator, Saltator atripennis (E-SA)
- Orinocan saltator, Saltator orenocensis (E-SA)
- Olive-gray saltator, Saltator olivascens
- Bluish-gray saltator, Saltator coerulescens (E-SA)
- Streaked saltator, Saltator striatipectus
- Green-winged saltator, Saltator similis (E-SA)
- Black-cowled saltator, Saltator nigriceps (E-SA)
- Thick-billed saltator, Saltator maxillosus (E-SA)
- Golden-billed saltator, Saltator aurantiirostris (E-SA)
- Masked saltator, Saltator cinctus (E-SA)
- Slate-colored grosbeak, Saltator grossus
- Black-throated grosbeak, Saltator fuliginosus (E-SA)
- Black-masked finch, Coryphaspiza melanotis (E-SA)
- Great Pampa-finch, Embernagra platensis (E-SA)
- Pale-throated Pampa-finch, Embernagra longicauda (E-BR)
- Wedge-tailed grass-finch, Emberizoides herbicola
- Duida grass-finch, Emberizoides duidae (E-VE)
- Lesser grass-finch, Emberizoides ypiranganus (E-SA)
- Cinereous finch, Piezorina cinerea (E-PE)
- Slender-billed finch, Xenospingus concolor (E-SA)
- Black-headed hemispingus, Pseudospingus verticalis (E-SA)
- Drab hemispingus, Pseudospingus xanthophthalmus (E-SA)
- Pink-billed cnemoscopus, Cnemoscopus rubrirostris (E-SA)
- Black-billed cnemoscopus, Cnemoscopus chrysogaster (E-PE)
- Bay-chested warbling finch, Castanozoster thoracicus (E-BR)
- Slaty-backed hemispingus, Poospiza goeringi (E-VE)
- Rufous-browed hemispingus, Poospiza rufosuperciliaris (E-PE)
- Bolivian warbling finch, Poospiza boliviana (E-SA)
- Cinnamon warbling finch, Poospiza ornata (E-AR)
- Black-and-chestnut warbling finch, Poospiza whitii (E-SA)
- Black-and-rufous warbling finch, Poospiza nigrorufa (E-SA)
- Rufous-breasted warbling finch, Poospiza rubecula (E-PE)
- Collared warbling finch, Poospiza hispaniolensis (E-SA)
- Cochabamba mountain finch, Poospiza garleppi (E-BO)
- Tucuman mountain finch, Poospiza baeri (E-AR)
- Chestnut-breasted mountain finch, Poospizopsis caesar (E-PE)
- Rufous-sided warbling finch, Poospizopsis hypochondria (E-SA)
- Gray-capped hemispingus, Kleinothraupis reyi (E-VE)
- Black-capped hemispingus, Kleinothraupis atropileus (E-SA)
- Parodi's hemispingus, Kleinothraupis parodii (E-PE)
- Orange-browed hemispingus, Kleinothraupis calophrys (E-SA)
- Oleaginous hemispingus, Sphenopsis frontalis (E-SA)
- Black-eared hemispingus, Sphenopsis melanotis (E-SA)
- Orange-headed tanager, Thlypopsis sordida (E-SA)
- Buff-bellied tanager, Thlypopsis inornata (E-SA)
- Fulvous-headed tanager, Thlypopsis fulviceps (E-SA)
- Chestnut-headed tanager, Thlypopsis ruficeps (E-SA)
- Rust-and-yellow tanager, Thlypopsis ruficeps (E-SA)
- Superciliaried hemispingus, Thlypopsis superciliaris (E-SA)
- Rufous-chested tanager, Thlypopsis ornata (E-SA)
- Brown-flanked tanager, Thlypopsis pectoralis (E-PE)
- Rusty-browed warbling finch, Microspingus erythrophrys (E-SA)
- Plain-tailed warbling finch, Microspingus alticola (E-PE)
- Three-striped hemispingus, Microspingus trifasciatus (E-SA)
- Buff-throated warbling finch, Microspingus lateralis (E-BR)
- Gray-throated warbling finch, Microspingus cabanisi (E-SA)
- Ringed warbling finch, Microspingus torquatus (E-SA)
- Black-capped warbling finch, Microspingus melanoleucus (E-SA)
- Cinereous warbling finch, Microspingus cinereus (E-BR)
- Pardusco, Nephelornis oneilli (E-PE)
- Black-backed bush tanager, Urothraupis stolzmanni (E-SA)
- White-rumped tanager, Cypsnagra hirundinacea (E-SA)
- Long-tailed reed finch, Donacospiza albifrons (E-SA)
- Great Inca-finch, Incaspiza pulchra (E-PE)
- Rufous-backed Inca-finch, Incaspiza personata (E-PE)
- Gray-winged Inca-finch, Incaspiza ortizi (E-PE)
- Buff-bridled Inca-finch, Incaspiza laeta (E-PE)
- Little Inca-finch, Incaspiza watkinsi (E-PE)
- Bananaquit, Coereba flaveola
- Yellow-faced grassquit, Tiaris olivaceus
- Dull-colored grassquit, Asemospiza obscura (E-SA)
- Sooty grassquit, Asemospiza fuliginosa (E-SA)
- Black-faced grassquit, Melanospiza bicolor
- Green warbler-finch, Certhidea olivacea (E-GA)
- Gray warbler-finch, Certhidea fusca (E-GA)
- Vegetarian finch, Platyspiza crassirostris (E-GA)
- Woodpecker finch, Camarhynchus pallidus (E-GA)
- Large tree-finch, Camarhynchus psittacula (E-GA)
- Medium tree-finch, Camarhynchus pauper (E-GA)
- Small tree-finch, Camarhynchus parvulus (E-GA)
- Mangrove finch, Camarhynchus heliobates (E-GA)
- Sharp-beaked ground-finch, Geospiza difficilis (E-GA)
- Vampire ground-finch, Geospiza septentrionalis (E-GA)
- Small ground-finch, Geospiza fuliginosa (E-GA)
- Medium ground-finch, Geospiza fortis (E-GA)
- Genovesa ground-finch, Geospiza acutirostris (E-GA)
- Common cactus-finch, Geospiza scandens (E-GA)
- Genovesa cactus-finch, Geospiza propinqua (E-GA)
- Large ground-finch, Geospiza magnirostris (E-GA)
- Española ground-finch, Geospiza conirostris (E-GA)
- Glistening-green tanager, Chlorochrysa phoenicotis (E-SA)
- Orange-eared tanager, Chlorochrysa calliparaea (E-SA)
- Multicolored tanager, Chlorochrysa nitidissima (E-CO)
- Black-crested finch, Lophospingus pusillus (E-SA)
- Gray-crested finch, Lophospingus griseocristatus (E-SA)
- White-banded tanager, Neothraupis fasciata (E-SA)
- Diuca finch, Diuca diuca (E-SA)
- Yellow cardinal, Gubernatrix cristata (E-SA)
- Red-crested cardinal, Paroaria coronata (E-SA)
- Red-cowled cardinal, Paroaria dominicana (E-BR)
- Masked cardinal, Paroaria nigrogenis (E-SA)
- Red-capped cardinal, Paroaria gularis (E-SA)
- Crimson-fronted cardinal, Paroaria baeri (E-BR)
- Yellow-billed cardinal, Paroaria capitata (E-SA)
- Diademed tanager, Stephanophorus diadematus (E-SA)
- Black-faced tanager, Schistochlamys melanopis (E-SA)
- Cinnamon tanager, Schistochlamys ruficapillus (E-BR)
- Magpie tanager, Cissopis leverianus (E-SA)
- Vermilion tanager, Calochaetes coccineus (E-SA)
- Purplish-mantled tanager, Iridosornis porphyrocephalus (E-SA)
- Yellow-throated tanager, Iridosornis analis (E-SA)
- Golden-collared tanager, Iridosornis jelskii (E-SA)
- Golden-crowned tanager, Iridosornis rufivertex (E-SA)
- Yellow-scarfed tanager, Iridosornis reinhardti (E-PE)
- Fawn-breasted tanager, Pipraeidea melanonota (E-SA)
- Blue-and-yellow tanager, Rauenia bonariensis (E-SA)
- Rufous-bellied mountain tanager, Pseudosaltator rufiventris (E-SA)
- Carriker's mountain tanager, Dubusia carrikeri (E-CO)
- Buff-banded mountain tanager, Dubusia taeniata (E-SA)
- Streak-crowned mountain tanager, Dubusia stictocehala (E-PE)
- Chestnut-bellied mountain tanager, Dubusia castaneoventris (E-SA)
- Black-cheeked mountain tanager, Anisognathus melanogenys (E-CO)
- Lacrimose mountain tanager, Anisognathus lacrymosus (E-SA)
- Scarlet-bellied mountain tanager, Anisognathus igniventris (E-SA)
- Blue-winged mountain tanager, Anisognathus somptuosus (E-SA)
- Black-chinned mountain tanager, Anisognathus notabilis (E-SA)
- Hooded mountain tanager, Buthraupis montana (E-SA)
- Masked mountain tanager, Tephrophilus wetmorei (E-SA)
- Blue-capped tanager, Sporathraupis cyanocephala (E-SA)
- Grass-green tanager, Chlorornis riefferii (E-SA)
- Black-chested mountain tanager, Cnemathraupis eximia (E-SA)
- Golden-backed mountain tanager, Cnemathraupis aureodorsalis (E-PE)
- Orange-throated tanager, Wetmorethraupis sterrhopteron (E-SA)
- Yellow-green tanager, Bangsia flavovirens (E-SA)
- Blue-and-gold tanager, Bangsia arcaei
- Black-and-gold tanager, Bangsia melanochlamys (E-CO)
- Golden-chested tanager, Bangsia rothschildi (E-SA)
- Moss-backed tanager, Bangsia edwardsi (E-SA)
- Gold-ringed tanager, Bangsia aureocincta (E-CO)
- Golden-naped tanager, Chalcothraupis ruficervix (E-SA)
- Gray-and-gold tanager, Poecilostreptus palmeri
- Black-headed tanager, Stilpnia cyanoptera (E-SA)
- Black-hooded tanager, Stilpnia whitelyi (E-SA)
- Silvery tanager, Stilpnia viridicollis (E-SA)
- Black-capped tanager, Stilpnia heinei (E-SA)
- Green-throated tanager, Stilpnia argyrofenges (E-SA)
- Sira tanager, Stilpnia phillipsi (E-PE)
- Black-backed tanager, Stilpnia peruviana (E-BR)
- Chestnut-backed tanager, Stilpnia preciosa (E-SA)
- Green-capped tanager, Stilpnia meyerdeschauenseei (E-SA)
- Burnished-buff tanager, Stilpnia cayana (E-SA)
- Scrub tanager, Stilpnia vitriolina (E-SA)
- Masked tanager, Stilpnia nigrocincta (E-SA)
- Golden-hooded tanager, Stilpnia larvata
- Blue-necked tanager, Stilpnia cyanicollis (E-SA)
- Blue-and-black tanager, Tangara vassorii (E-SA)
- Beryl-spangled tanager, Tangara nigroviridis (E-SA)
- Metallic-green tanager, Tangara labradorides (E-SA)
- Blue-browed tanager, Tangara cyanotis (E-SA)
- Plain-colored tanager, Tangara inornata
- Turquoise tanager, Tangara mexicana (E-SA)
- Paradise tanager, Tangara chilensis (E-SA)
- Opal-rumped tanager, Tangara velia (E-SA)
- Opal-crowned tanager, Tangara callophrys (E-SA)
- Green-headed tanager, Tangara seledon (E-SA)
- Seven-colored tanager, Tangara fastuosa (E-BR)
- Red-necked tanager, Tangara cyanocephala (E-BR)
- Brassy-breasted tanager, Tangara desmaresti (E-BR)
- Gilt-edged tanager, Tangara cyanoventris (E-BR)
- Rufous-winged tanager, Tangara lavinia
- Bay-headed tanager, Tangara gyrola
- Rufous-cheeked tanager, Tangara rufigenis (E-VE)
- Golden-eared tanager, Tangara chrysotis (E-SA)
- Saffron-crowned tanager, Tangara xanthocephala (E-SA)
- Flame-faced tanager, Tangara parzudakii (E-SA)
- Green-and-gold tanager, Tangara schrankii (E-SA)
- Blue-whiskered tanager, Tangara johannae (E-SA)
- Golden tanager, Tangara arthus (E-SA)
- Emerald tanager, Tangara florida
- Silver-throated tanager, Tangara icterocephala
- Blue-gray tanager, Thraupis episcopus
- Sayaca tanager, Thraupis sayaca (E-SA)
- Glaucous tanager, Thraupis glaucocolpa (E-SA)
- Azure-shouldered tanager, Thraupis cyanoptera (E-BR)
- Golden-chevroned tanager, Thraupis ornata (E-BR)
- Palm tanager, Thraupis palmarum
- Dotted tanager, Ixothraupis varia (E-SA)
- Rufous-throated tanager, Ixothraupis rufigula (E-SA)
- Speckled tanager, Ixothraupis guttata
- Yellow-bellied tanager, Ixothraupis xanthogastra (E-SA)
- Spotted tanager, Ixothraupis punctata (E-SA)

== See also ==
- List of birds of Argentina
- List of birds of Aruba
- List of birds of Bolivia
- List of birds of Bonaire
- List of birds of Brazil
- List of birds of Chile
- List of birds of Colombia
- List of birds of Curaçao
- List of birds of Ecuador
- List of birds of the Falkland Islands
- List of birds of French Guiana
- List of birds of the Galápagos Islands
- List of birds of Guyana
- List of birds of Paraguay
- List of birds of Peru
- List of birds of Suriname
- List of birds of Trinidad and Tobago
- List of birds of Uruguay
- List of birds of Venezuela
