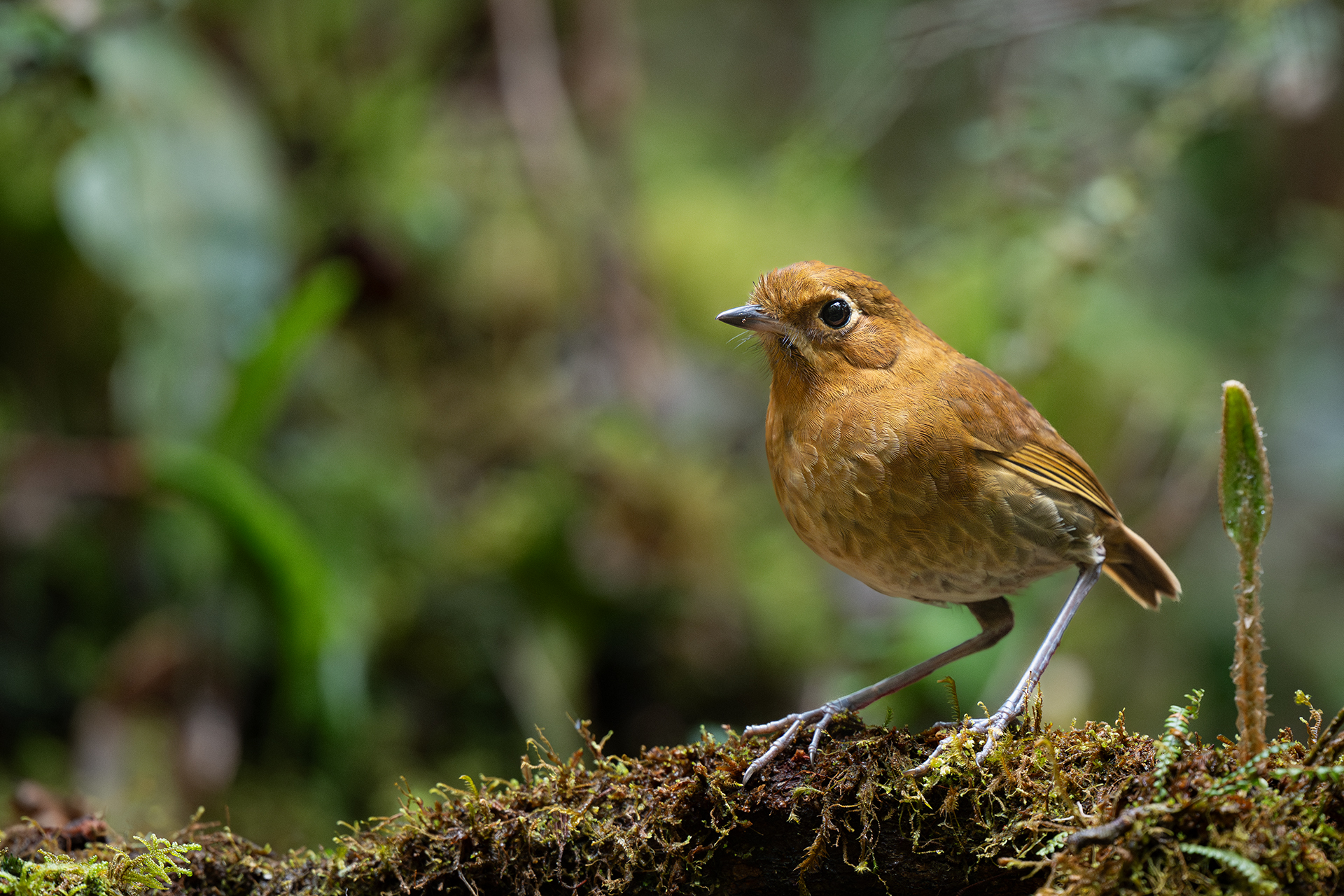

Scientific classification
- Kingdom: Animalia
- Phylum: Chordata
- Class: Aves
- Order: Passeriformes
- Family: Grallariidae
- Genus: Grallaria
- Species complex: Grallaria rufula complex
- Species: G. rufula

Binomial name
- Grallaria rufula Lafresnaye, 1843

= Muisca antpitta =

Species of bird

The Muisca antpitta (Grallaria rufula sensu stricto) is a bird in the family Grallariidae. The species was first described by Frédéric de Lafresnaye in 1843. It was formerly called the rufous antpitta, which in 2020 was found to be a species complex composed of as many as 15 species, some of which were newly described. It is found in the Andes of northern Colombia and western Venezuela.

== Taxonomy and systematics ==
What is now the Muisca antpitta inherited the scientific name Grallaria rufula after the rufous antpitta's taxonomic split because the type specimen for G. rufula had been found near Bogotá in what is now recognized as the Muisca antpitta's range. The species and subspecies resulting from the split and newly recognized taxa were separated based on plumage, vocalizations, and genetic evidence.

In 2021 the International Ornithological Committee and the Clements taxonomy implemented the split of the rufous antpitta and accepted the newly described species. The revised Grallaria rufula, now called the Muisca antpitta, has no subspecies and is thus monotypic according to those taxonomies. However, BirdLife International's Handbook of the Birds of the World (HBW) did not fully implement the split. It retains the name rufous antpitta for Grallaria rufula and retains six of the seven previous subspecies within it. It had split only the former G. r. saltuensis as the Perija antpitta in 2018.

The species' new common name was chosen in 2020 for the Muisca civilization of the eastern Andes, which continues to this day in contemporary Colombian society. The specific epithet, rufula, comes from the Latin for 'red-headed' or rufous.

This article follows the monotypic species model.

== Description ==
Grallaria antpittas are a "wonderful group of plump and round antbirds whose feathers are often fluffed up...they have stout bills [and] very short tails". The Muisca antpitta is about 14 to 15 cm (5.5 to 5.9 in) long; four individuals weighed 32 to 36 g (1.1 to 1.3 oz). The sexes have the same plumage. Adults have rufous brown upperparts that are a slightly brighter rufous on their face, throat, and breast. Their underparts are mostly rufous brown with dark grayish rufous flanks, a paler rufous central belly, and white or buffy white lower belly and vent. Their undertail coverts can be whitish to buffy or brownish. Both sexes have a dark brown iris, a blackish bill with sometimes a paler base to the mandible, and lead gray to blue-gray legs and feet.

== Distribution and habitat ==
The Muisca antpitta is found from Táchira state in western Venezuela south through north-central Colombia to Cundinamarca and western Meta departments. The species inhabits the floor and undergrowth of humid, mossy, epiphyte-laden montane forest. It favors areas with dense vegetation such as forest edges, regenerating treefalls and landslide scars, and thickets of Chusquea bamboo. It also occurs in Polylepis woodlands and nearby páramo. In elevation it ranges between 1,850 and 3,800 m (6,100 and 12,500 ft).

It is separated from the closely related Perija antpitta by the Serranía de Los Motilones mountain range, and it is separated from most of the Equatorial antpitta (G. saturata) population by the Magdalena river valley.

== Behavior ==
=== Movement ===
The Muisca antpitta is assumed to be resident throughout its range.

=== Feeding ===
The Muisca antpitta's diet has not been detailed but is known to include insects, snails, and earthworms. It forages by running or hopping on the forest floor and stopping to find prey by flipping aside leaf litter and probing the soil.

=== Breeding ===
Nothing is known about the Muisca antpitta's breeding biology.

=== Vocalization ===
The Muisca antpitta's long song is "a drawn out series of clear whistles with a slightly clipped sound...lasting a total of ~6–11 seconds" and accelerates at the end. It also has a short song, "a thin, clear whistle lasting ~0.75 s...followed by a pause and then a lower, fast liquid trill of about the same length".

== Status ==
The IUCN follows HBW taxonomy and so has not assessed Grallaria rufula as the Muisca antpitta but rather as the former rufous antpitta with six subspecies. "Although its range is reasonably large, most portions of it are under serious threat of deforestation and habitat alteration. It is, however, known to occur within a fair number of conservation areas."
