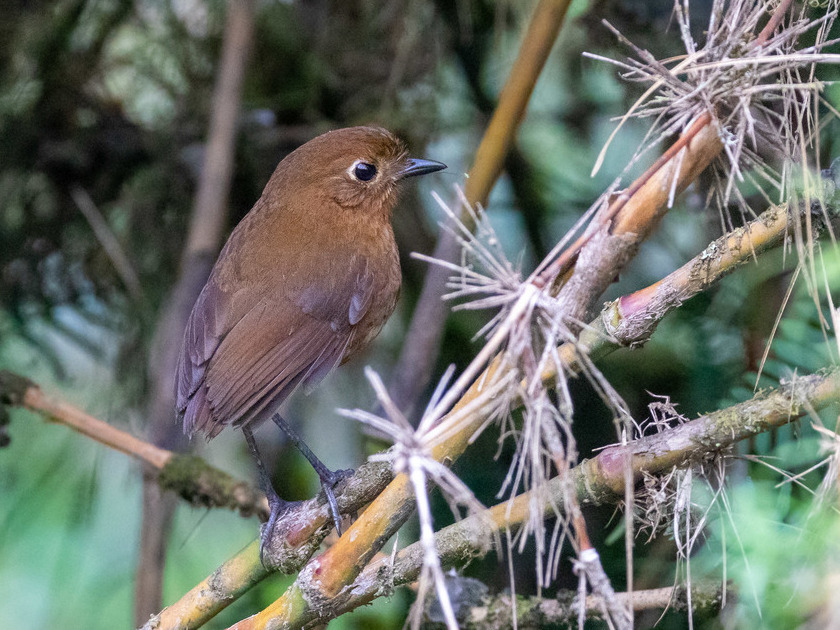

Scientific classification
- Kingdom: Animalia
- Phylum: Chordata
- Class: Aves
- Order: Passeriformes
- Family: Grallariidae
- Genus: Grallaria
- Species complex: Grallaria rufula complex
- Species: G. obscura

Binomial name
- Grallaria obscura Berlepsch & Stolzmann, 1896

Synonyms
- Grallaria rufula obscura

= Junin antpitta =

Species of bird

The Junin antpitta (Grallaria obscura) is a species of bird in the family Grallariidae. It is endemic to the Peruvian Department of Junín.

== Taxonomy and systematics ==
The Junin antpitta was originally described in 1896 as the subspecies G. rufula obscura of the rufous antpitta. Research published in 2020 showed that it was a distinct species, and another 2020 publication confirmed that it is part of the rufous antpitta species complex of some 15 species. The International Ornithological Committee and the Clements taxonomy recognized the new species in 2021. However, as of early 2024 BirdLife International's Handbook of the Birds of the World (HBW) retains it as a subspecies of G. rufula for which it also retains the English name rufous antpitta.

The Junin antpitta is named after the Department of Junín, Peru, the only department in which it occurs.

The Junin antpitta is monotypic. It, the Chachapoyas antpitta (G. gravesi), and the Panao antpitta (G. oneilli) are sister species.

== Description ==
Grallaria antpittas are a "wonderful group of plump and round antbirds whose feathers are often fluffed up...they have stout bills [and] very short tails". The Junin antpitta is about 14.5 to 15 cm (5.7 to 5.9 in) long. The sexes have the same plumage. Adults have a mostly dark reddish yellow-brown crown, upperparts, wings, and tail with lighter edges on the flight feathers. They have a pale buff eyering. Their throat and breast are reddish yellow-brown that is paler on the belly. The center of their belly is whitish and their flanks are a reddish yellow-brown whose intensity is between those of the upperparts and breast. Both sexes have a dark brown iris, a black bill, and light blue-gray legs and feet.

== Distribution and habitat ==
The Junín antpitta is found on the eastern slope of the Peruvian Andes in the department of Junín. Its range is bounded in the north by the Perené and Paucartambo rivers, in the west by the Ene River, and in the south by the Mantaro River. It is separated from the Panao antpitta by the Perené and Paucartambo rivers and from the Urubamba antpitta (G. occabambae) by the Apurímac River. Its exact habitat requirements have not been documented. It is thought to favor the floor and understory of humid montane forest heavy with moss and epiphytes and with much Chusquea bamboo. In elevation it is known between 3,000 and 3,600 m (9,800 and 11,800 ft).

== Behavior ==
=== Movement ===
The Junin antpitta is assumed to be resident throughout its range.

=== Feeding ===
The Junin antpitta's diet is not known but is assumed to be similar to those of other Grallaria antpittas. They feed on arthropods, earthworms, and other invertebrates. It runs or hops on the forest floor and stops to find prey by flipping aside leaf litter and probing the soil.

=== Breeding ===
Nothing is known about the Junin antpitta's breeding biology.

=== Vocalization ===
The Junin antpitta's long song is "a relatively slow series of buzzy notes at an even pitch, but slowing slightly towards the end of the song". Its short song is an "evenly pitched, modulated, two-noted song initiated by a single, abrupt note followed by a much longer buzzy note, the whole song lasting c 0.75-1.25 seconds". It appears to sing mostly at dawn, and usually from the ground or a low perch.

== Status ==
The IUCN follows HBW taxonomy and so has not assessed the Junin antpitta separately from the multi-subspecies "rufous" antpitta G. rufula sensu lato. It suspected but not confirmed to occur in two protected areas. The habitat in its range "is relatively intact, on the whole, but at a local scale many portions have been severely impacted by grazing, burning, and crop cultivation".
