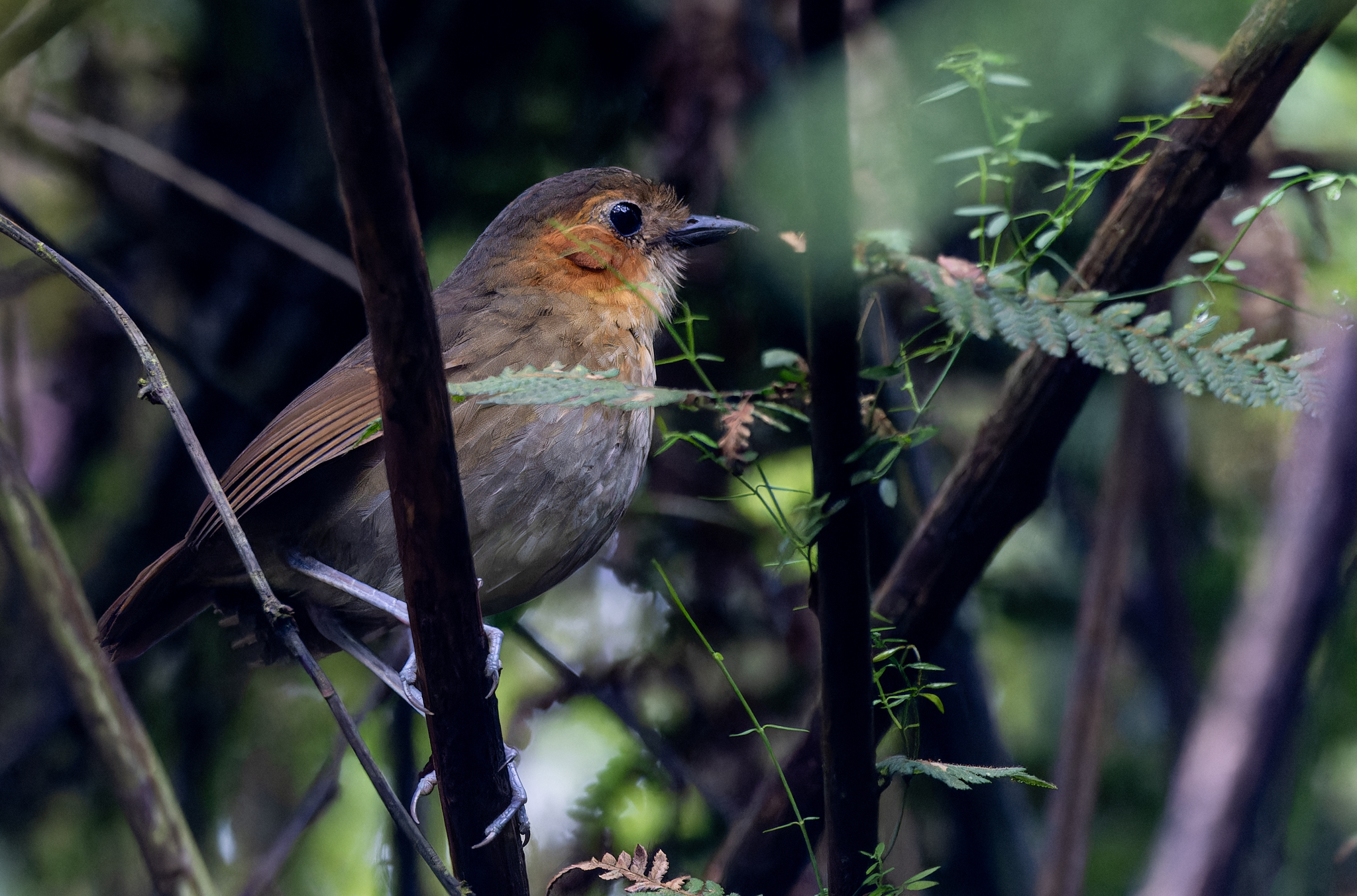

Conservation status
- Least Concern (IUCN 3.1)

Scientific classification
- Kingdom: Animalia
- Phylum: Chordata
- Class: Aves
- Order: Passeriformes
- Family: Grallariidae
- Genus: Grallaria
- Species: G. erythrotis

Binomial name
- Grallaria erythrotis Sclater, PL & Salvin, 1876

= Rufous-faced antpitta =

Species of bird

The rufous-faced antpitta (Grallaria erythrotis) is a species of bird in the family Grallariidae. It is found in Bolivia and Peru.

== Taxonomy and systematics ==
The rufous-faced antpitta is monotypic. It and the red-and-white antpitta (G. erythroleuca) are sister species.

== Description ==
The rufous-faced antpitta is 15.5 to 19 cm (6.1 to 7.5 in) long and weighs between 53 and 70 g (1.9 and 2.5 oz). The sexes have the same plumage. Adults have dull ochraceous-gray or ochraceous-brown crown, nape, back, wings, and tail. Their lores, face, and the sides of their neck are bright orange-ochraceous. Their throat is bright white, their upper breast pale orange-ochraceous with faint white streaks, their lower breast and belly whitish, and their flanks and crissum pale ochraceous-gray. They have a dark brown iris, a black bill with a horn-colored tip, and gray or pinkish gray legs and feet.

== Distribution and habitat ==
Some sources state that the rufous-faced antpitta is endemic to Bolivia. Others include Peru in its range. In Bolivia it occurs from far west-central Santa Cruz Department northwest through Cochabamba Department and La Paz Department. According to the International Ornithological Committee its range extends from La Paz slightly into southeastern Peru's Department of Puno. The species seldom occurs in the interior of mature forest but inhabits areas with dense vegetation such as secondary forest and forest edges along roads and watercourses. It apparently favors disturbed habitat, whether human-made or natural. In elevation it ranges between 1,700 and 3,300 m (5,600 and 10,800 ft) but is most abundant between 2,000 and 3,000 m (6,600 and 9,800 ft).

== Behavior ==
=== Movement ===
The rufous-faced antpitta is believed to be a year-round resident throughout its range.

=== Feeding ===
The rufous-faced antpitta's diet and foraging behavior have not been detailed; it is known to eat arthropods and perhaps earthworms and small vertebrates as do other members of genus Grallaria . It is known to forage on or very near the ground.

=== Breeding ===
Nothing definitive is known about the rufous-faced antpitta's breeding biology.

=== Vocalization ===
The rufous-faced antpitta's song is a "series of three easily imitated flat-pitched whistles whuu-whue-whee. Typically, each whistle is marginally higher-pitched and shorter in duration than the previous one, with especially the last one having a rising end". It also makes a "single drawn-out descending whistle weeeuw". It primarily sings in the morning and less often in the afternoon and at dusk. It typically sings from near the ground on a log or low branch.

== Status ==
The IUCN has assessed the rufous-faced antpitta as being of Least Concern. It has a restricted range; its population size is not known and is believed to be stable. No immediate threats have been identified. "[L]like most tropical species it should be carefully watched as human encroachment on its habitat continues. The Rufous-faced Antpitta appears fairly immune to anthropogenic disturbance to their habitat, as long as second growth and forest edge are maintained."
