= Cajamarca antpitta =

Scientific classification
- Kingdom: Animalia
- Phylum: Chordata
- Class: Aves
- Order: Passeriformes
- Family: Grallariidae
- Genus: Grallaria
- Species complex: Grallaria rufula complex
- Species: G. cajamarcae

Binomial name
- Grallaria cajamarcae (Chapman, 1927)

Synonyms
- Oropezus cajamarcae; Grallaria rufula cajamarcae

Species of bird

The Cajamarca antpitta (Grallaria cajamarcae) is a species of bird in the family Grallariidae. It is endemic to Peru.

== Taxonomy and systematics ==
The Cajamarca antpitta was described in 1927 as a full species, Oropezus cajamarcae. However, during the twentieth century it was treated by most authors as a subspecies of what was then the rufous antpitta (G. rufula sensu lato). Following the publication of two studies in 2020, in 2021 the International Ornithological Committee and the Clements taxonomy implemented the proposed split of the rufous antpitta that returned the Cajamarca antpitta to species status. However, BirdLife International's Handbook of the Birds of the World (HBW) retains it as a subspecies of G. rufula for which it also retains the English name rufous antpitta.

The Cajamarca antpitta's English name and specific epithet derive from the Peruvian Department of Cajamarca where the holotype was collected.

The Cajamarca antpitta is monotypic.

== Description ==
Grallaria antpittas are a "wonderful group of plump and round antbirds whose feathers are often fluffed up...they have stout bills [and] very short tails". The Cajamarca antpitta is about 14.5 to 15 cm (5.7 to 5.9 in) long. The sexes have the same plumage. Adults have a mostly dark reddish yellow-brown crown, upperparts, wings, and tail with lighter edges on the flight feathers. They have a pale eyering. Their underparts are mostly light reddish yellow-brown. The center of their belly is pale yellowish buff, their flanks yellowish brown, and their undertail coverts dark yellowish brown. Both sexes have a dark brown iris, a blackish bill with a paler base, and dusky bluish or purplish gray legs and feet.

== Distribution and habitat ==
The Cajamarca antpitta is found on the west slope of northwestern Peruvian Andes west of the Huancabamba and upper Marañón rivers. The rivers separate it from the closely related Equatorial antpitta (G. saturata). Its range includes parts of Cajamarca, Piura, and Lambayeque departments. Its exact habitat requirements have not been documented. However, it appears to favor the floor and understory of moderately humid cloudforest. In elevation it is known between 2,850 and 3,400 m (9,400 and 11,200 ft).

== Behavior ==
=== Movement ===
The Cajamarca antpitta is assumed to be resident throughout its range.

=== Feeding ===
The Cajamarca antpitta's diet and foraging behavior are unknown but are assumed to be similar to those of other Grallaria antpittas. They eat arthropods and other invertebrates captured while running or hopping on the forest floor and stopping to find prey by flipping aside leaf litter and probing the soil.

=== Breeding ===
Nothing is known about the Cajamarca antpitta's breeding biology.

=== Vocalization ===
The Cajamarca antpitta's long song is "a relatively fast series of clear, slightly descending notes at ca. 2.5 kHz, speeding up and rising in pitch towards the end of the ca. 2.5 s song". Its short song is "a slow series of 5-6 whistled notes, either even or slightly downslurred in pitch at ca. 2.2 kHz". The species sings from the ground or a low perch in dense foliage.

== Status ==
The IUCN follows HBW taxonomy and so has not assessed the Cajamarca antpitta separately from the multi-subspecies "rufous" antpitta G. rufula sensu lato. It has a moderately large range and is known from at least two protected areas. "Habitat within the range of Cajamarca Antpitta has been, and continues to be, however, severely impacted by human activities."
