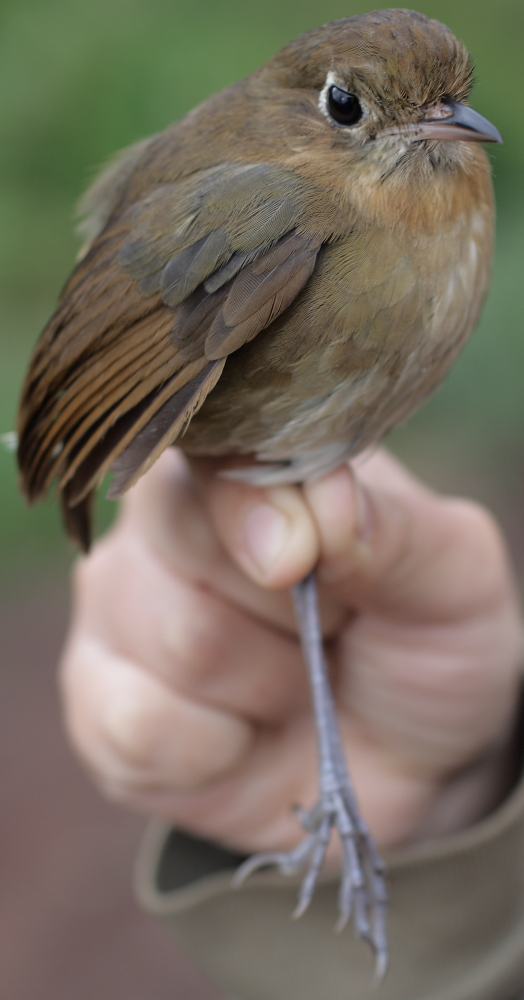

Conservation status
- Near Threatened (IUCN 3.1)

Scientific classification
- Kingdom: Animalia
- Phylum: Chordata
- Class: Aves
- Order: Passeriformes
- Family: Grallariidae
- Genus: Grallaria
- Species complex: Grallaria rufula complex
- Species: G. saltuensis

Binomial name
- Grallaria saltuensis Wetmore, 1946

Synonyms
- Grallaria rufula saltuensis Wetmore, 1946

= Perija antpitta =

Species of bird

The Perija antpitta (Grallaria saltuensis) is a Near Threatened species of bird in the family Grallariidae. It is endemic to the Serranía del Perijá on the border of Colombia and Venezuela.

== Taxonomy and systematics ==
The Perija antpitta was described in 1946 as a subspecies of the rufous antpitta (Grallaria rufula saltuensis). In 2018 BirdLife International's Handbook of the Birds of the World elevated it to species status based in part on a 2016 publication. Following a study published in 2020, in 2021 the International Ornithological Committee and the Clements taxonomy followed suit.

The Perija antpitta had earlier been treated by some authors as conspecific with the tawny antpitta (G. quitensis).

The Perija antpitta is monotypic.

== Description ==
Grallaria antpittas are a "wonderful group of plump and round antbirds whose feathers are often fluffed up...they have stout bills [and] very short tails". The Perija antpitta is about 14 to 15 cm (5.5 to 5.9 in) long. The sexes have the same plumage. Adults have buff brown to olive brown upperparts with whitish bases on the forecrown feathers. They have deep olive buff lores, a thin and indistinct whitish eyering, and brownish ear coverts. Their wings are mostly buff brown to olive brown with gray brown to brownish olive outer edges on the flight feathers. Their tail is buffy gray brown. Their throat is whitish. Their underparts are mostly dull white with buffy brown breast sides, flanks, and thighs. Both sexes have a dark brown iris, a dusky brown to grayish black maxilla, a mandible with a grayish pink base and a dark gray to blackish tip, and fuscous, pinkish gray legs and feet.

== Distribution and habitat ==
The Perija antpitta is found entirely within the Serranía del Perijá in the Venezuelan state of Zulia and the Colombian departments of La Guajira and Cesar. Its exact habitat requirements have not been documented. However, it appears to favor the floor and understory of humid montane forest, its edges, and also nearby disturbed areas. In elevation it ranges between 2,500 and 3,250 m (8,200 and 10,700 ft).

The Perija antpitta is separated from the closely related Muisca antpitta (G. rufula) by the Serranía de Los Motilones, and from the also closely related Sierra Nevada antpitta (G. spaciator) by the Cesar depression that separates the Perijá range from the Sierra Nevada de Santa Marta.

== Behavior ==
=== Movement ===
The Perija antpitta is assumed to be resident throughout its range.

=== Feeding ===
The Perija antpitta's diet and foraging behavior are unknown but are assumed to be similar to those of other Grallaria antpittas. They eat arthropods and other invertebrates captured while running or hopping on the forest floor and stopping to find prey by flipping aside leaf litter and probing the soil.

=== Breeding ===
Nothing is known about the Perija antpitta's breeding biology.

=== Vocalization ===
The Perija antpitta's long song is a "descending series of 10–20 notes uttered at an average pace of about 5 notes/s and with a frequency drop from start to end of about 500 Hz. Notes are typically pure and overslurred, and they reach a maximum frequency at the start of about 3.5k Hz. The pace accelerates towards the end." Its short song is a "flat-pitched trill, lasting 0.4‒0.5 seconds and comprising 11–14 elements uttered at a pace of 25‒30 elements/s." The species typically sings at dawn and dusk from the ground or a low perch in dense vegetation.

== Status ==
The IUCN originally in 2016 assessed the Perija antpitta as Endangered and since 2022 as Near Threatened. It has a limited range and its estimated population of between 1000 and 2500 mature individuals is believed to be decreasing. "The only threat known to this species is the loss and fragmentation of its forested habitat. In the Sierra de Perijá, forests in elevations below 2,000 m are under threat from a range of processes, including colonisation, ranching and the cultivation of narcotics, which are aided by the roads approaching the Colombian side." It is considered uncommon to rare in Colombia. It occurs in the relatively new Chamicero de Perijá preserve in Colombia and may occur in other preserves.
