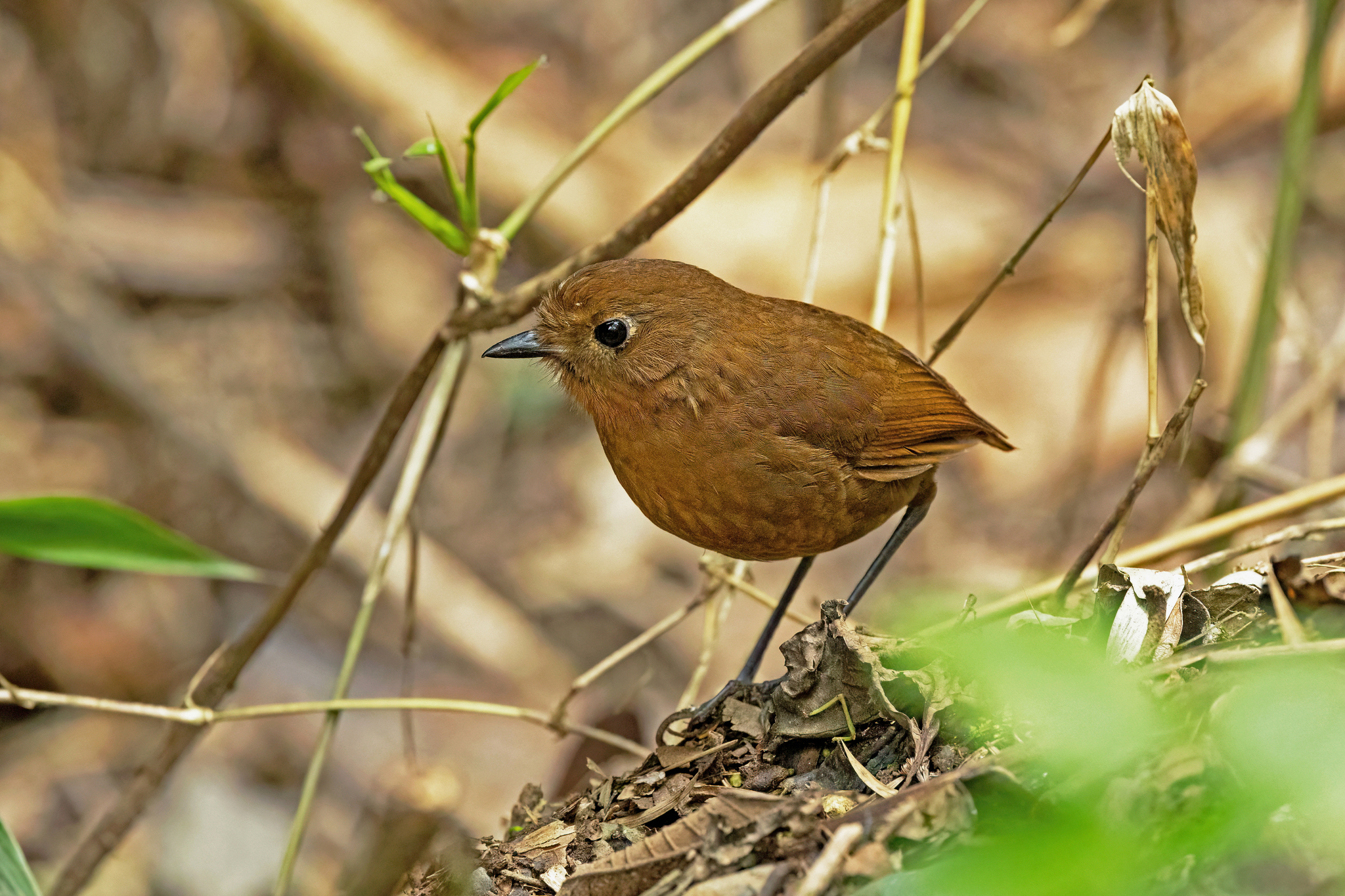

Scientific classification
- Kingdom: Animalia
- Phylum: Chordata
- Class: Aves
- Order: Passeriformes
- Family: Grallariidae
- Genus: Grallaria
- Species complex: Grallaria rufula complex
- Species: G. sinaensis

Binomial name
- Grallaria sinaensis Robbins, Isler, ML, Chesser & Tobias, 2020

= Puno antpitta =

Species of bird

The Puno antpitta (Grallaria sinaensis) is a species of bird in the family Grallariidae. It is found in Bolivia and Peru.

== Taxonomy and systematics ==
The Puno antpitta was described by Mark B. Robbins, Morton L. Isler, R. Terry Chesser and Joseph Tobias in 2020 as a member of the rufous antpitta complex. The International Ornithological Committee and the Clements taxonomy recognized the new species in 2021. However, as of early 2024 BirdLife International's Handbook of the Birds of the World (HBW) did not recognize it.

The Puno antpitta's specific epithet sinaensis comes from the species' type locality, the Sina District in the Department of Puno, Peru. The common name is from that department.

The Puno antpitta is monotypic. It and the Bolivian antpitta (G. cochabambae) are sister species.

== Description ==
Grallaria antpittas are a "wonderful group of plump and round antbirds whose feathers are often fluffed up...they have stout bills [and] very short tails". The holotype Puno antpitta, a male, weighed 34.2 g (1.2 oz). The sexes have the same plumage. Adults have a mostly dark reddish yellow-brown crown, upperparts, wings, and tail with lighter edges on the flight feathers. They have a pale eyering. Their throat and breast are light reddish yellow-brown, their belly and undertail coverts pale buffy brown, and their flanks dark reddish yellow-brown. Their lower breast and belly have thin darker streaks. Both sexes have a dark brown iris, a black bill, and bluish gray legs and feet.

== Distribution and habitat ==
The Puno antpitta has a very restricted range in Peru's Puno Department and Bolivia's La Paz Department. All of the records come from between the Sandia River valley in the north and the Consata River valley in the south. Its exact habitat requirements have not been documented. The holotype was collected in temperate forest. At least in Bolivia, it favors areas of dense undergrowth at treeline, along rivers, and at forest edges; it is sometimes associated with bamboo. In elevation it is known between 2,700 and 3,150 m (8,900 and 10,300 ft).

== Behavior ==
=== Movement ===
The Puno antpitta is assumed to be resident throughout its range.

=== Feeding ===
The Puno antpitta's diet is not known except that it includes insects. Its diet is assumed to be similar to those of other Grallaria antpittas, which feed on arthropods, earthworms, and other invertebrates. Its foraging behavior is also unknown, but again it is assumed to be like that of other antpittas. They run or hop on the forest floor and stop to find prey by flipping aside leaf litter and probing the soil.

=== Breeding ===
The Puno antpitta's breeding season appears to include October, but nothing else is known about the species' breeding biology.

=== Vocalization ===
The Puno antpitta's long song is a "[r]elatively long (c 3.5+ s), and moderately-paced (c 6 notes/s) series of clear slightly downslurred notes that start at c 3 kHz, descend slightly to c 2.7 kHz before ascending again to c 3-3.1 kHz, and a similar pattern where the notes of the song lengthen slightly at the beginning of the song and then shorten slightly at the end". Its short song is "[n]otably simple, a two note song consisting of clear, downslurred whistles at c 2.4 kHz, given quickly, the entire song lasting c 0.3-0.4s".

== Status ==
The IUCN follows HBW taxonomy, which does not recognize the Puno antpitta, and so has not assessed it. It is known to occur in Madidi National Park in Bolivia.

== See also ==
- List of bird species described in the 2020s
