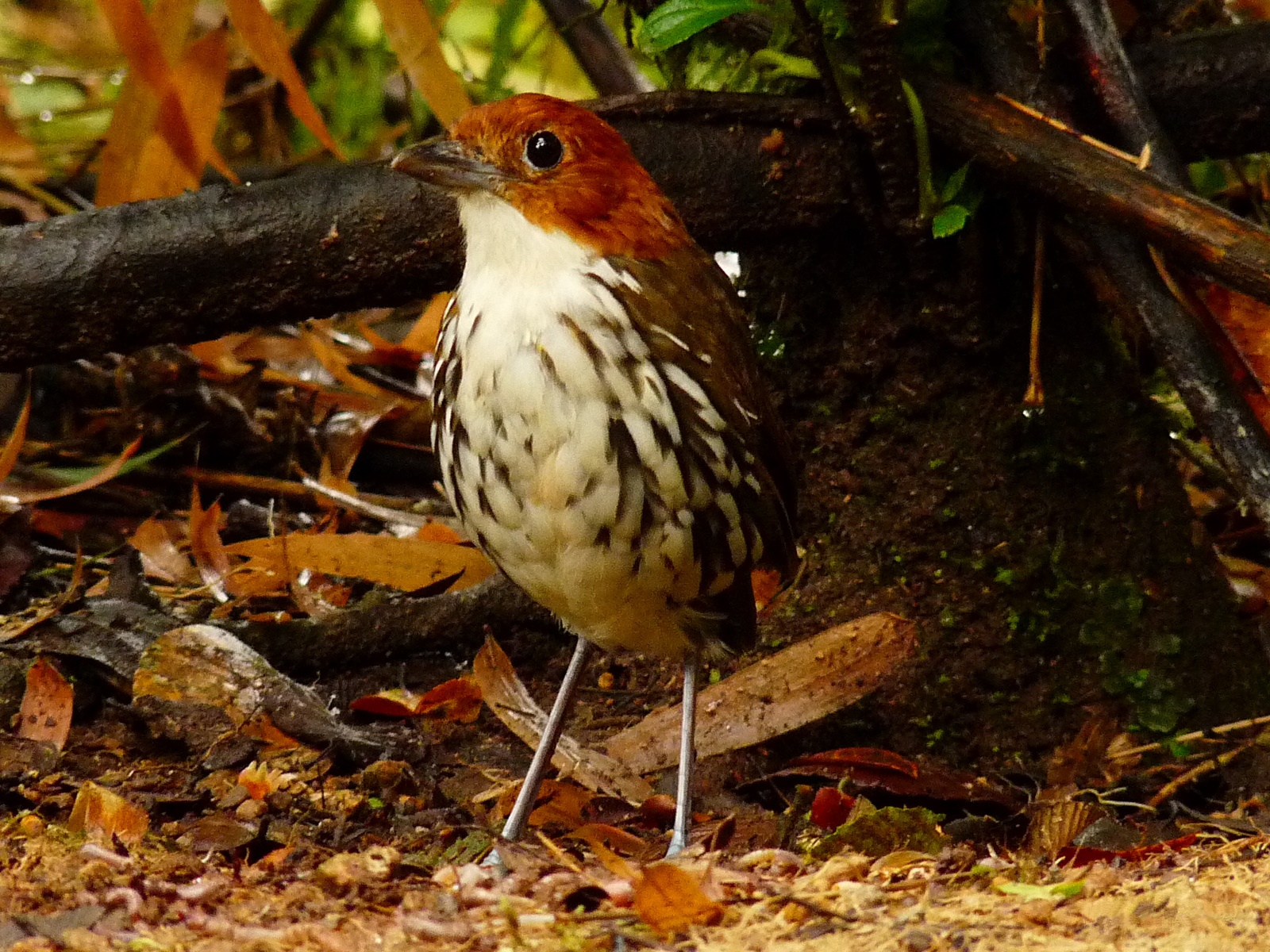
- Chestnut-crowned antpitta (Grallaria ruficapilla)

Scientific classification
- Kingdom: Animalia
- Phylum: Chordata
- Class: Aves
- Order: Passeriformes
- Family: Grallariidae
- Genus: Grallaria; Vieillot, 1816

Type species
- Formicarius varius Boddaert, 1783

Species
- 47, see text.

= Grallaria =

Genus of birds

Grallaria is a large genus of Neotropical birds in the antpitta family Grallariidae.

== Taxonomy ==
The genus was introduced by the French ornithologist Louis Pierre Vieillot in 1816 with the variegated antpitta (Grallaria varia) as the type species. The genus name is from Neo-Latin grallarius meaning "stilt-walker".

== Species ==
The genus contains the following 47 species

Image	Common name	Scientific name	Distribution
	Undulated antpitta	Grallaria squamigera	northern Andes
	Giant antpitta	Grallaria gigantea	northern Andes of Colombia and Ecuador
-	Great antpitta	Grallaria excelsa	mountains of northwestern Venezuela
	Variegated antpitta	Grallaria varia	Amazonia and Atlantic Forest
	Scaled antpitta	Grallaria guatimalensis	Central America and northwestern South America
	Moustached antpitta	Grallaria alleni	northern Andes of Colombia and Ecuador
-	Tachira antpitta	Grallaria chthonia	Venezuelan Andes montane forests
	Plain-backed antpitta	Grallaria haplonota	northern Andes and Venezuelan Coastal Range
	Ochre-striped antpitta	Grallaria dignissima	north of the Marañón River
-	Elusive antpitta	Grallaria eludens	western Amazonia
	Santa Marta antpitta	Grallaria bangsi	Sierra Nevada de Santa Marta
	Chestnut-crowned antpitta	Grallaria ruficapilla	northern Andes
	Cundinamarca antpitta	Grallaria kaestneri	Cordillera Oriental (Colombia)
	Watkins's antpitta	Grallaria watkinsi	Tumbes
	Stripe-headed antpitta	Grallaria andicolus	Peruvian Andes
	Chestnut-naped antpitta	Grallaria nuchalis	northern Andes of Colombia and Ecuador
	Jocotoco antpitta	Grallaria ridgelyi	Chinchipe River and Cordillera del Cóndor
	Pale-billed antpitta	Grallaria carrikeri	Andes of northern Peru
	Yellow-breasted antpitta	Grallaria flavotincta	northern Andes of Colombia and Ecuador
	White-bellied antpitta	Grallaria hypoleuca	northern Andes
	Rusty-tinged antpitta	Grallaria przewalskii	Andes of northern Peru
	Bay antpitta	Grallaria capitalis	Andes of central Peru
	Red-and-white antpitta	Grallaria erythroleuca	Andes of southern Peru
	White-throated antpitta	Grallaria albigula	Yungas and southern Andean Yungas
-	Grey-naped antpitta	Grallaria griseonucha	Venezuelan Andes montane forests
	Perija antpitta	Grallaria saltuensis	Serranía del Perijá
	Sierra Nevada antpitta	Grallaria spatiator	Sierra Nevada de Santa Marta
	Muisca antpitta	Grallaria rufula	Andes of eastern Colombia and western Venezuela
	Bicolored antpitta	Grallaria rufocinerea	Cauca and upper Magdalena valley
	Chami antpitta	Grallaria alvarezi	west of the Cauca River
	Equatorial antpitta	Grallaria saturata	east of the Cauca River, lower Magdalena valley and Ecuador
-	Cajamarca antpitta	Grallaria cajamarcae	west of the Huancabamba and upper Marañón river
	Chachapoyas antpitta	Grallaria graves	south of Marañón and north of Huallaga river
	Panao antpitta	Grallaria oneilli	south of Huallaga and north of Perené river
	Junin antpitta	Grallaria obscura	between the rio Perené, Ene and Apurímac
	Urubamba antpitta	Grallaria occabambae	Yanatili river
	Puno antpitta	Grallaria sinaensis	south of Sandia river (Peru) and north of Constanta river (Bolivia)
-	Bolivian antpitta	Grallaria cochabambae	Bolivian Andes
	Chestnut antpitta	Grallaria blakei	Cordillera Oriental (Peru)
	Oxapampa antpitta	Grallaria centralis	from the Huallaga to the Mantaro river
	Ayacucho antpitta	Grallaria ayacuchensis	between the rio Mantaro, Pampa and Apurímac
	Rufous-faced antpitta	Grallaria erythrotis	Yungas and Bolivian Andes
	Tawny antpitta	Grallaria quitensis	northern Andes
	Boyaca antpitta	Grallaria alticola	Cordillera Oriental (Colombia)
	Atuen antpitta	Grallaria atuensis	northern Cordillera Oriental (Peru)
	Brown-banded antpitta	Grallaria milleri	Cordillera Central (Colombia)
	Urrao antpitta	Grallaria urraoensis	Páramo del Sol, Colombia
