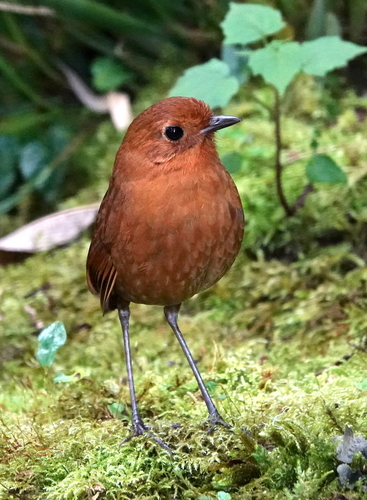

Scientific classification
- Kingdom: Animalia
- Phylum: Chordata
- Class: Aves
- Order: Passeriformes
- Family: Grallariidae
- Genus: Grallaria
- Species complex: Grallaria rufula complex
- Species: G. saturata

Binomial name
- Grallaria saturata Domaniewski & Stolzmann, 1918

Synonyms
- Grallaria rufula saturata; Grallaria rufula (in part)

= Equatorial antpitta =

Species of bird

The equatorial antpitta (Grallaria saturata) is a species of bird in the family Grallariidae. It is found is Colombia, Ecuador, and Peru.

== Taxonomy and systematics ==
The equatorial antpitta has a complicated taxonomic history. It was originally described in 1918 as the subspecies G. rufula saturata of the rufous antpitta. It later lost its separate identity by being merged into G. rufula. However, a study published in 2020 resurrected the synonymized subspecies and promoted it to species rank using genetic evidence and analysis of vocalizations. Another 2020 publication confirmed its placement in the rufous antpitta complex. The International Ornithological Committee and the Clements taxonomy recognized its promotion in 2021. As of early 2024 BirdLife International's Handbook of the Birds of the World (HBW) had not recognized it as a species or subspecies.

The equatorial antpitta is named for its distribution that roughly centers on the Equator.

The equatorial antpitta is monotypic.

== Description ==
Grallaria antpittas are a "wonderful group of plump and round antbirds whose feathers are often fluffed up...they have stout bills [and] very short tails". The equatorial antpitta is about 14.5 to 15 cm (5.7 to 5.9 in) long and weighs 32 to 47 g (1.1 to 1.7 oz). The sexes have the same plumage. Adults have mostly rufous-brown upperparts; the sides of their head are somewhat more rufous. Their underparts are also mostly more rufous than their upperparts, with dark gray-brown flanks, a light rufous center to the belly, a buffy white to white vent, and whitish undertail coverts. Both sexes have a dark brown iris, a blackish bill with a paler base to the mandible, and grayish blue to vinaceous gray legs and feet.

== Distribution and habitat ==
The equatorial antpitta is the most widely distributed species in the rufus antpitta complex. It has a disjunct distribution with two main populations separated by the Colombian Massif. The northern population is found in Colombia's Central Andes east of the Cauca River and has a small subpopulation further east past the Magdalena River Valley in the Iguaque Massif. The southern population is found on the western slope of Colombia's Eastern Andes and from there south through both of Ecuador's Andean ranges into northern Peru north of the Maranon River and east of the Huancabamba River in the departments of Cajamarca and Piura. It is separated from the closely related Cajamarca antpitta (G. cajamarcae) by the Huancabamba and Marañón rivers, and from the Chami antpitta (G. alvarezi) by the Cauca River Valley.

The equatorial antpitta inhabits the floor and understory in the interior and edges of humid montane forest heavy with moss and epiphytes. It also occurs in more open environs such as páramo adjacent to forest, forest trails, and bare landslides. Some authors also say it favors boggy areas, seeps, and riparian corridors. In elevation it mostly ranges between 2,500 and 3,300 m (8,200 and 10,800 ft) but there are records as low as 2,200 m (7,200 ft) and as high as 3,900 m (12,800 ft).

== Behavior ==
=== Movement ===
The equatorial antpitta is assumed to be resident throughout its range.

=== Feeding ===
The equatorial antpitta's diet appears to be solely invertebrates including arthropods and earthworms. It forages while running or hopping on the forest floor and stopping to find prey by reaching into leaf litter and probing the soil. It has been observed associating with mixed-species feeding flocks. It is hypothesized to follow large mammals like tapirs to catch prey disturbed by their passage.

=== Breeding ===
The equatorial antpitta's breeding season has not been fully defined but appears to vary latitudinally and be concentrated in the local dry season. Its nest is a large cup made mostly of moss and sometimes thinly lined with fibers like grass, rootlets, and fungal rhizomorphs. All of the known nests were within 2.0 m (7 ft) of the ground. They were variously placed on a stump, on epiphyte clusters on a tree trunk, on stems near a tree trunk, and on a mossy cliff ledge, and were usually at least partially hidden. Nests have been found with one and two eggs. Both members of pairs have been observed building nests, both incubate the eggs, and both brood and provision nestlings. The incubation period and time to fledging are not known.

=== Vocalization ===
The equatorial antpitta's long song is "a rapid, slightly descending trill of short, ringing notes lasting ~1.5–3.5 [seconds]". Its short song "begins with a single clear note, followed by a brief pause and then a fast, accelerating but stuttering trill of 4–5 notes". It apparently sings mostly at dawn and from a low perch.

== Status ==
The IUCN follows HBW taxonomy, which does not recognize the equatorial antpitta, and so has not assessed it. It is found in many governmental and private protected areas in Ecuador including Podocarpus National Park and Tabaconas Namballe National Sanctuary, a few in Colombia, and at least two in Peru. It " does not appear to be under immediate threat...however, the Equatorial Antpitta is undoubtedly detrimentally impacted by burning, forest clearing for agriculture and livestock, and other anthropogenic habitat modifications".
