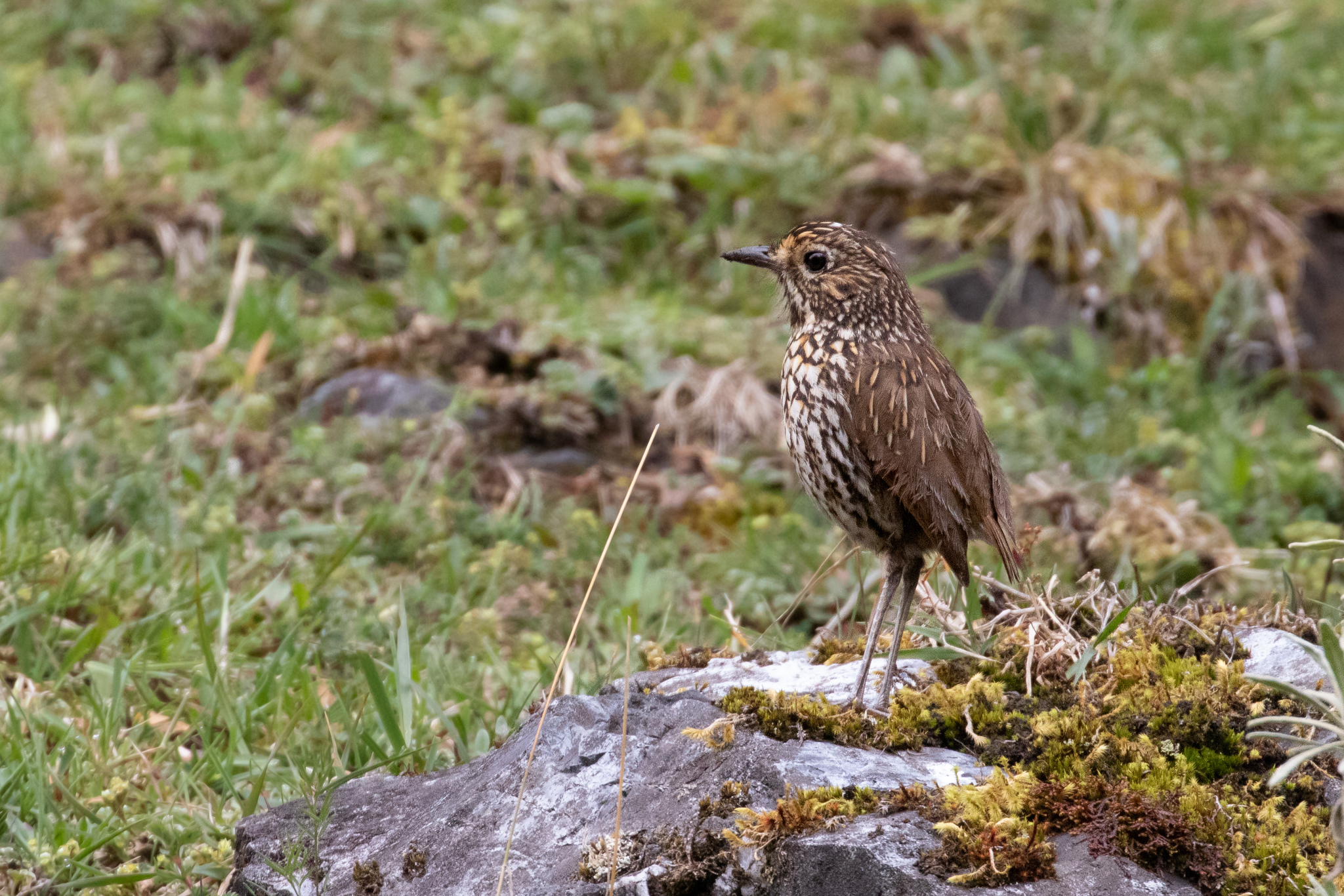

Conservation status
- Least Concern (IUCN 3.1)

Scientific classification
- Kingdom: Animalia
- Phylum: Chordata
- Class: Aves
- Order: Passeriformes
- Family: Grallariidae
- Genus: Grallaria
- Species: G. andicolus

Binomial name
- Grallaria andicolus (Cabanis, 1873)

= Stripe-headed antpitta =

Species of bird

The stripe-headed antpitta (Grallaria andicolus) is a species of bird in the family Grallariidae. It is found in Bolivia and Peru.

== Taxonomy and systematics ==
The stripe-headed antpitta was described by German ornithologist Jean Louis Cabanis as Hypsibamon andicolus.

The stripe-headed antpitta has two subspecies, the nominate G. a. andicolous (Cabanis, 1873) and G. a. punensis (Chubb, 1918). Subspecies G. a. punensis was originally described as a species and because the two differ somewhat in their vocalizations some authors have suggested that G. a. punensis should again be treated as a species.

The exact relation of the stripe-headed antpitta to other members of genus Grallaria is not known and there are indications that it might belong in its own genus.

== Description ==
Grallaria antpittas are a "wonderful group of plump and round antbirds whose feathers are often fluffed up...they have stout bills [and] very short tails". The stripe-headed antpitta is 16 to 16.5 cm (6.3 to 6.5 in) long and weighs 48 to 66 g (1.7 to 2.3 oz). The sexes have the same plumage. Adults of the nominate subspecies have a blackish forecrown and a brown or olive brown hindcrown, both of which have white or buff streaks. They have whitish buff or buff lores spot that merges with a white ring around the eye on a face otherwise streaked with whitish, buff, and black. Their back and rump are grayish olive or olive brown with black and whitish streaks on the former. Their tail is olive brown or dull reddish brown. Their flight feathers are dusky with dull rufous edges and their wing coverts are olive brown with small buff spots. Their throat is whitish or buff with darker streaks on the side. The center of their breast is whitish with black and buff feather edges that give a scaled appearance. The sides of their breast are olive brown with white streaks. Their belly is whitish with dusky feather edges that give a spotted appearance. Subspecies G. a. punensis has a blacker crown than the nominate, with orange-buff streaks. Their lores and face are buffier. Their back has no streaks. Their lower throat is brighter and the streaking on their underparts is heavier. Both subspecies have a brown iris, a black bill, and blue-gray legs and feet.

== Distribution and habitat ==
The stripe-headed antpitta is a bird of the Andes. The nominate subspecies is found in Peru's western Andes between southern Cajamarca and Ayacucho departments and in the country's central Andes between southern Amazonas and Apurímac departments. Subspecies G. a. punensis is found further south, from Cuzco and Puno departments in Peru south into western La Paz Department in Bolivia. In elevation in Peru it mostly ranges between 3,500 and 4,600 m (11,500 and 15,100 ft) but locally as low as 3,000 m (9,800 ft). The stripe-headed antpitta primarily inhabits woodlands dominated by Polylepis and Gynoxys shrubs and trees, though it also occurs in puna grasslands. In a few locations it also occurs at the edges of treeline forest.

== Behavior ==
=== Movement ===
The stripe-headed antpitta is resident throughout its range.

=== Feeding ===
The diet and foraging behavior of the stripe-headed antpitta have not been detailed but it is known to feed on insects. It is primarily terrestrial, foraging mostly on the ground and also by climbing branches a little above it.

=== Breeding ===
The stripe-headed antpitta's breeding season has not been fully defined but appears to include from December to perhaps May. Nothing else is known about its breeding biology.

=== Vocalization ===
The stripe-headed antpitta's song is "a low, grinding, froglike trill that rises and falls, often with an introductory stutter: gr-grrrEEEEErrrr". The subspecies have different calls. That of the nominate is "a single, somewhat wheezy, slightly descending note" and that of G. a. punensis "1-2, usually mellower notes alike".

== Status ==
The IUCN has assessed the stripe-headed antpitta as being of Least Concern. It has a large range; its population size is not known and is believed to be stable. No immediate threats have been identified. It is considered locally fairly common in Peru. "The extent of its primary habitat, Polylepis woodland, continues to decrease (due to pressure from grazing and cutting for fuel), but the antpitta is relatively tolerant of habitat disturbance."
