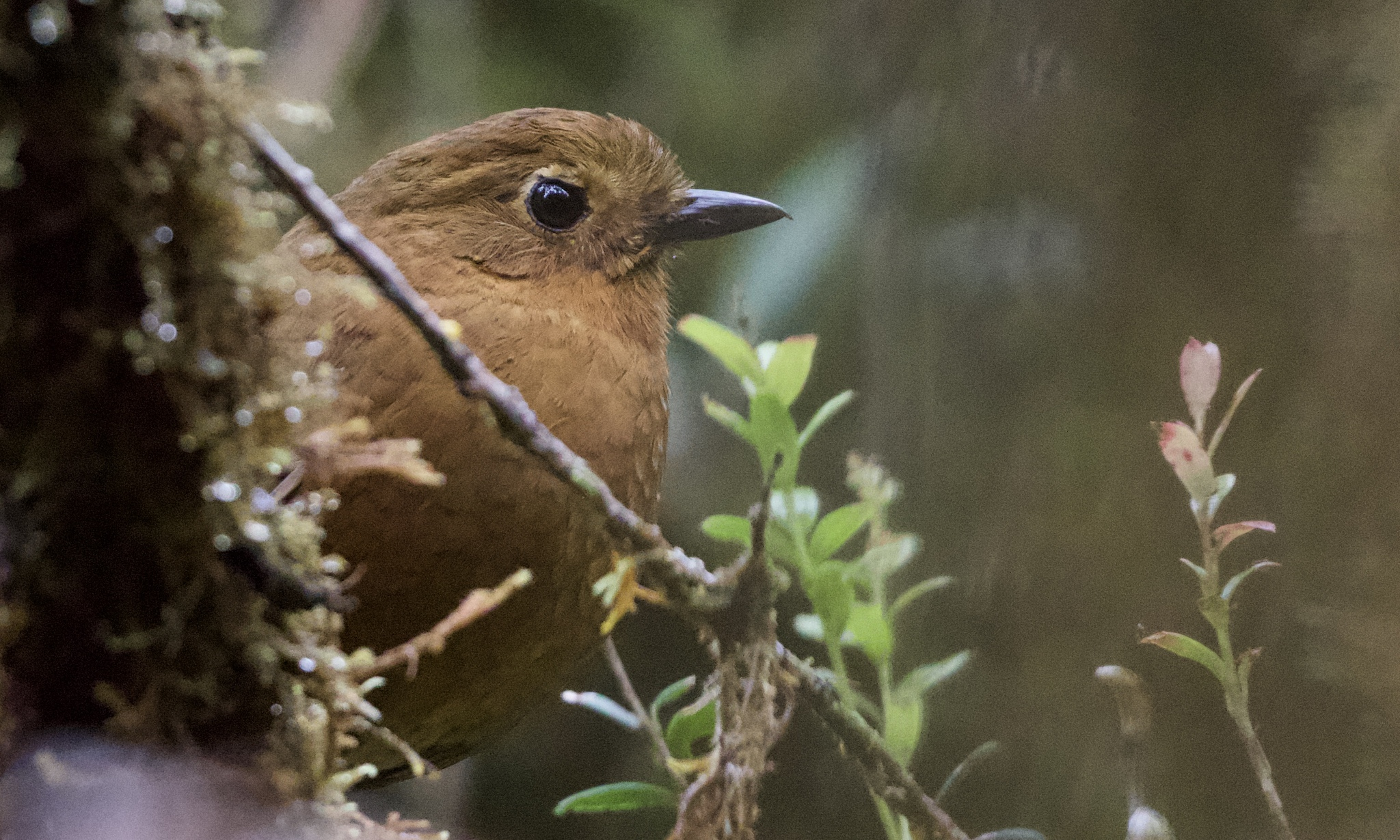

Scientific classification
- Kingdom: Animalia
- Phylum: Chordata
- Class: Aves
- Order: Passeriformes
- Family: Grallariidae
- Genus: Grallaria
- Species complex: Grallaria rufula complex
- Species: G. gravesi

Binomial name
- Grallaria gravesi Isler, ML, Chesser, Robbins & Hosner, 2020

= Chachapoyas antpitta =

Species of bird

The Chachapoyas antpitta, or Graves's antpitta, (Grallaria gravesi) is a species of bird in the family Grallariidae. It is endemic to Peru.

== Taxonomy and systematics ==
What is now the Chachapoyas antpitta was usually considered an undifferentiated population within subspecies Grallaria rufula obscura of what was then the rufous antpitta, though since the early 2000s it had been recognized as distinct. Research published in 2020 showed that it was a distinct species, and another 2020 publication confirmed that it is part of the rufous antpitta species complex of some 15 species. The International Ornithological Committee and the Clements taxonomy recognized the new species in 2021. As of early 2024 BirdLife International's Handbook of the Birds of the World (HBW) had not recognized it.

The Chachapoyas antpitta is monotypic. It, the Panao antpitta (G. oneilli), and the Junin antpitta (G. obscura) form a clade and may be sister species.

The specific epithet gravesi, and the alternate English name Graves's antpitta, honor Dr. Gary R. Graves, an ornithologist whose work contributed to the discovery of the Chachapoya antpitta.

== Description ==
Grallaria antpittas are a "wonderful group of plump and round antbirds whose feathers are often fluffed up...they have stout bills [and] very short tails". The Chachapoyas antpitta is about 14.5 to 15 cm (5.7 to 5.9 in) long and weighs an average of about 42 g (1.5 oz). The sexes have the same plumage. Adults have a mostly dark reddish yellow-brown crown, upperparts, wings, and tail with lighter edges on the flight feathers. They have a pale buff eyering. Their throat and breast are reddish yellow-brown. Their belly is a paler reddish yellow-brown with a whitish center and their flanks are a reddish yellow-brown whose intensity is between those of the breast and belly. Both sexes have a dark brown iris, a slate gray bill, and blue-gray legs and feet.

== Distribution and habitat ==
The Chachapoyas antpitta is found on the eastern slope of the Peruvian Andes in the departments of Amazonas, San Martín and Huánuco. Its range is south and east of the Maranon River and north of the Huallaga River. The latter river separates it from the Panao antpitta. Its exact habitat requirements have not been documented. However, it appears to favor the floor and understory in the interior and edges of humid montane forest heavy with moss and epiphytes and with much Chusquea bamboo. In elevation it is known between 2,400 and 3,900 m (7,900 and 12,800 ft).

== Behavior ==
=== Movement ===
The Chachapoyas antpitta is assumed to be resident throughout its range.

=== Feeding ===
The Chachapoyas antpitta's diet has not been detailed but is known to include insects. Its diet is assumed to be similar to those of other Grallaria antpittas which include other arthropods and earthworms. It runs or hops on the forest floor and stops to find prey by flipping aside leaf litter and probing the soil.

=== Breeding ===
Nothing is known about the Chachapoyas antpitta's breeding biology.

=== Vocalization ===
The Chachapoyas antpitta's long song is "a series of buzzy notes that increase and then decrease in pace, initially at an even pitch but with the final few, shorter notes increasing in pitch". Its short song is an "evenly pitched, modulated, two-noted song initiated by a single abrupt note followed by a much longer buzzy note, the whole song lasting ~0.75–1.25 seconds". The species sings at any time but mostly just after dawn, and from the ground or a low branch.

== Status ==
The IUCN follows HBW taxonomy, which does not recognize the Chachapoyas antpitta, and so has not assessed it. The species is known from a few protected areas. "Habitat within the range of the Chachapoyas Antpitta is relatively intact, on the whole, but at a local scale many portions have been severely impacted by grazing, burning, and crop cultivation".

== See also ==
- List of bird species described in the 2020s
