= Bolivian antpitta =

Scientific classification
- Kingdom: Animalia
- Phylum: Chordata
- Class: Aves
- Order: Passeriformes
- Family: Grallariidae
- Genus: Grallaria
- Species complex: Grallaria rufula complex
- Species: G. cochabambae

Binomial name
- Grallaria cochabambae Bond & Meyer de Schauensee, 1940

Synonyms
- Grallaria rufula cochabambae (Bond & Meyer de Schauensee, 1940)

Species of bird

The Bolivian antpitta (Grallaria cochabambae) is a bird in the family Grallariidae. The species was first described by James Bond and Rodolphe Meyer de Schauensee in 1940. It is endemic to Bolivia. It is a member of the rufous antpitta species complex and was elevated from subspecies to species in 2020 on the basis of differences in plumage and vocalizations.

== Taxonomy ==
The Bolivian antpitta was originally described as a subspecies of rufous antpitta (G. rufula cochabambae), but a 2020 study elevated it to species status due to differences in plumage color and vocalizations.

The Bolivian antpitta's common name is named for the country in which it lives; however, the closely related Puno antpitta also lives in Bolivia. The specific name, cochabambae, comes from the type locality of the species: Cochabamba, Bolivia.

== Distribution and habitat ==
The Bolivian antpitta is endemic to Bolivia and to the departments of Cochabamba and La Paz. It is found at elevations of 2,950–3,500 m. Its preferred habitat is humid montane forest and it prefers the understory and forest floor.

The Bolivian antpitta is protected in some parts of its range including in Amboró National Park, Bolivia.
