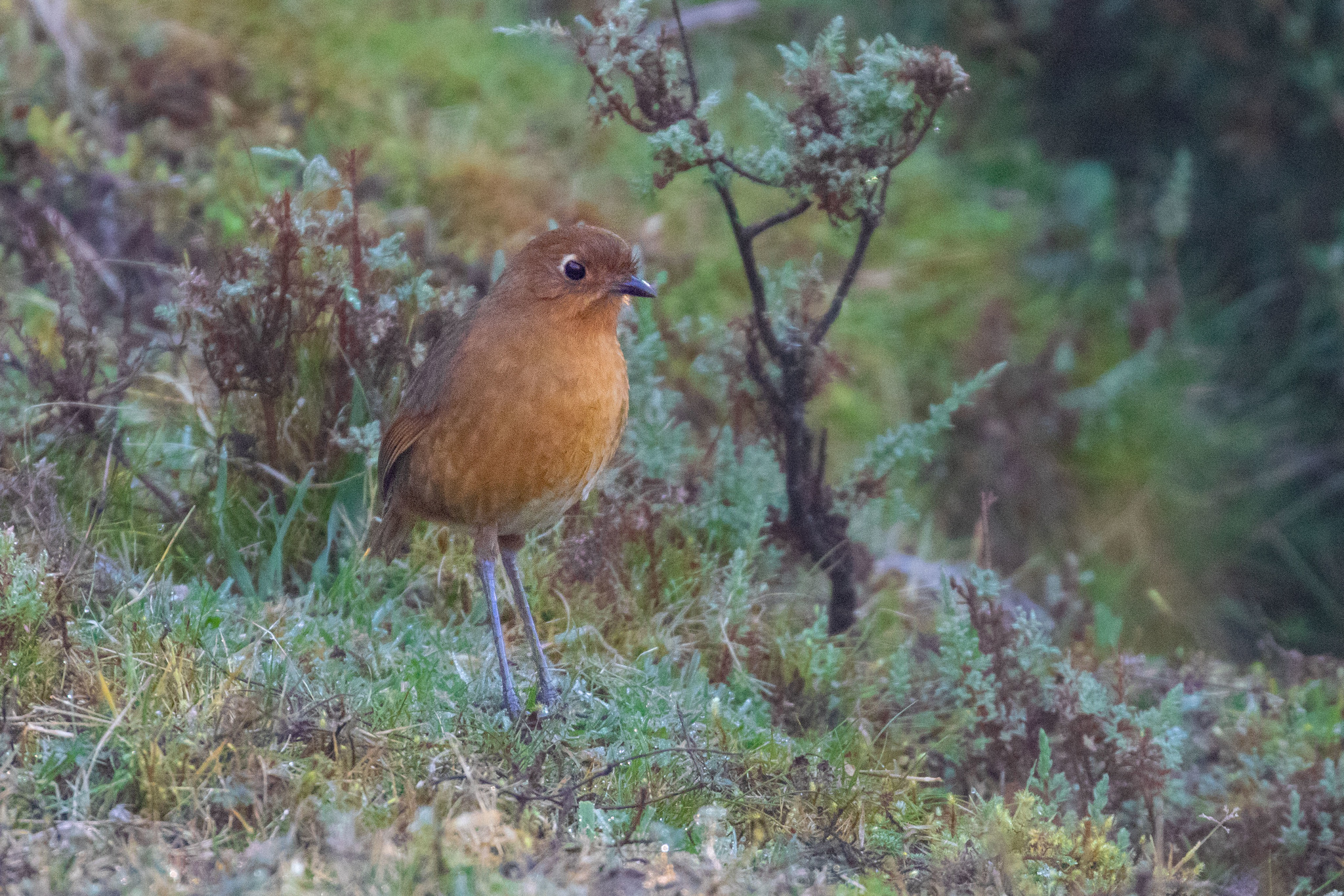

Scientific classification
- Kingdom: Animalia
- Phylum: Chordata
- Class: Aves
- Order: Passeriformes
- Family: Grallariidae
- Genus: Grallaria
- Species complex: Grallaria rufula complex
- Species: G. oneilli

Binomial name
- Grallaria oneilli Chesser & Isler, ML, 2020

= Panao antpitta =

Species of bird

The Panao antpitta (Grallaria oneilli), also known as O'Neill's antpitta, is a species of bird in the family Grallariidae. It is endemic to Peru.

== Taxonomy and systematics ==
What is now the Panao antpitta was an undifferentiated population within subspecies Grallaria rufula obscura of what was then the rufous antpitta. Research published in 2020 showed that it was a distinct species, and another 2020 publication confirmed that it is part of the rufous antpitta species complex of some 15 species. The International Ornithological Committee and the Clements taxonomy recognized the new species in 2021. As of early 2024 BirdLife International's Handbook of the Birds of the World (HBW) had not recognized it.

The Panao antpitta is monotypic. It, the Chachapoyas antpitta (G. gravesi), and the Junin antpitta (G. obscura) are sister species.

The specific epithet oneilli, and the alternate English name O'Neill's antpitta, honor Dr. John P. O'Neill, the ornithologist who collected the type specimen in Huánaco in 1983.

== Description ==
Grallaria antpittas are a "wonderful group of plump and round antbirds whose feathers are often fluffed up...they have stout bills [and] very short tails". The holotype male Panao antpitta weighed 38 g (1.3 oz). The sexes have the same plumage. Adults have a mostly dark reddish yellow-brown crown, upperparts, wings, and tail with lighter edges on the flight feathers. They have a pale buff eyering. Their throat and breast are light reddish yellow-brown that is paler on the belly. The center of their belly is whitish and their flanks are a reddish yellow-brown whose intensity is between those of the upperparts and breast. Both sexes have a dark brown iris, a blackish bill with a pinkish base to the mandible, and medium gray legs and feet.

== Distribution and habitat ==
The Panao antpitta is found on the eastern slope of the Peruvian Andes in the departments of Huánaco and Pasco. Its range is south of the Huallaga River and north of the Perené River. The former separates it from the Chachapoyas antpitta and the latter from the Junin antpitta. Its exact habitat requirements have not been documented. It is thought to favor the floor and understory in the interior and edges of humid cloudforest heavy with moss and epiphytes and with much Chusquea bamboo. In elevation it is known between 2,750 and 3,700 m (9,000 and 12,100 ft).

== Behavior ==
=== Movement ===
The Panao antpitta is assumed to be resident throughout its range.

=== Feeding ===
The Panao antpitta's diet has not been detailed but is known to include insects. Its diet is assumed to be similar to those of other Grallaria antpittas which include other arthropods and earthworms. It runs or hops on the forest floor and stops to find prey by flipping aside leaf litter and probing the soil.

=== Breeding ===
Nothing is known about the Panao antpitta's breeding biology.

=== Vocalization ===
The Panao antpitta's long song is "a series of buzzy notes that at first decrease slightly and then increase in pace, initially at an even pitch but with the final few, shorter notes slightly increasing in pitch". Its short song is an "evenly pitched, modulated, two-noted song initiated by a single, abrupt note followed by a much longer buzzy note, the whole song lasting c 0.75-1.25 seconds".

== Status ==
The IUCN follows HBW taxonomy, which does not recognize the Panao antpitta, and so has not assessed it. It is "known to occur within the Parque Nacional Yanachaga-Chemillén and the Área de Conservación Privada San Marcos".

== See also ==
- List of bird species described in the 2020s
