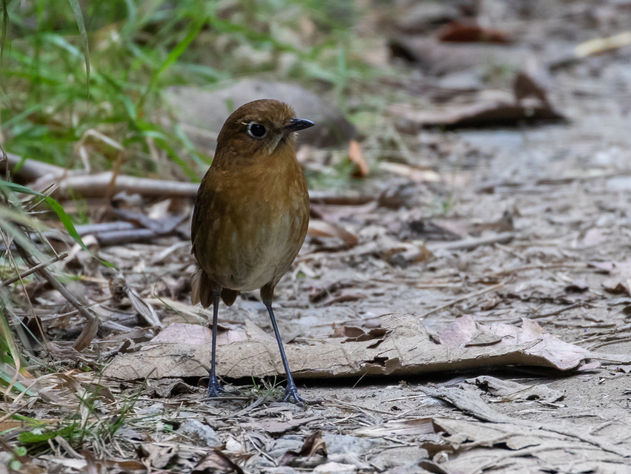

Scientific classification
- Kingdom: Animalia
- Phylum: Chordata
- Class: Aves
- Order: Passeriformes
- Family: Grallariidae
- Genus: Grallaria
- Species complex: Grallaria rufula complex
- Species: G. spatiator

Binomial name
- Grallaria spatiator Bangs, 1898

Synonyms
- Grallaria rufula spatiator

= Sierra Nevada antpitta =

Species of bird

The Sierra Nevada antpitta (Grallaria spatiator) is a species of bird in the family Grallariidae. It is endemic to the Sierra Nevada de Santa Marta in northern Colombia.

== Taxonomy and systematics ==
The Sierra Nevada antpitta was described in 1898 as a full species. However, during the twentieth century it was treated by most authors as a subspecies of what was then the rufous antpitta (G. rufula sensu lato). Following the publication of two studies in 2020, in 2021 the International Ornithological Committee and the Clements taxonomy implemented the proposed split of the rufous antpitta that returned the Sierra Nevada antpitta to species status. However, BirdLife International's Handbook of the Birds of the World (HBW) retains it as a subspecies of G. rufula for which it also retains the English name rufous antpitta.

The Sierra Nevada antpitta gets its common name from the mountain range in which it lives, the Sierra Nevada de Santa Marta. The specific epithet spatiator comes from the Latin for "pedestrian".

The Sierra Nevada antpitta is monotypic.

== Description ==
Grallaria antpittas are a "wonderful group of plump and round antbirds whose feathers are often fluffed up...they have stout bills [and] very short tails". The Sierra Nevada antpitta is about 13 to 14 cm (5.1 to 5.5 in) long. The sexes have the same plumage. Adults have a mostly dark reddish yellow-brown crown, upperparts, wings, and tail with lighter edges on the flight feathers. They have a whitish spot behind the eye that sometimes is part of an eyering. Their underparts are mostly light grayish white with a brownish yellow tinge that is strong across their breast. Their flanks are the same dark reddish yellow-brown as their upperparts. Both sexes have a dark brown iris, a dark gray to blackish maxilla, a mandible with a grayish pink base and a dusky to blackish tip, and plumbeous or dark bluish gray legs and feet.

== Distribution and habitat ==
The Sierra Nevada antpitta is found only in the isolated Sierra Nevada de Santa Marta of northern Colombia. Their range includes parts of Magdalena, La Guajira and Cesar departments. Its exact habitat requirements have not been documented. However, it appears to favor the floor and understory of temperate forest that is heavy with moss and epiphytes. In elevation it ranges between 2,200 and 2,900 m (7,200 and 9,500 ft).

It is separated from the closely related Perija antpitta (G. saltuensis) by the Cesar depression separating the Santa Maria range from the Serranía del Perijá.

== Behavior ==
=== Movement ===
The Sierra Nevada antpitta is assumed to be resident throughout its range.

=== Feeding ===
The Sierra Nevada antpitta's diet and foraging behavior are unknown but are assumed to be similar to those of other Grallaria antpittas. They eat arthropods and other invertebrates captured while running or hopping on the forest floor and stopping to find prey by flipping aside leaf litter and probing the soil.

=== Breeding ===
Nothing is known about the Sierra Nevada antpitta's breeding biology.

=== Vocalization ===
The Sierra Nevada antpitta's long song is "a ringing, 3 [second] trill of c. 30 notes, evenly paced at 9.5–10.0 notes/[second] and falling gradually". Its short song is "a short, high-pitched whistle that descends slightly".

== Status ==
The IUCN follows HBW taxonomy and so has not assessed the Sierra Nevada antpitta separately from the multi-subspecies "rufous" antpitta G. rufula sensu lato. "Given its extremely small distribution and the historic and continued threat to habitat within its range, this Colombian endemic antpitta should most likely be considered threatened, as are many other species endemic to the Sierra Nevada de Santa Marta."
