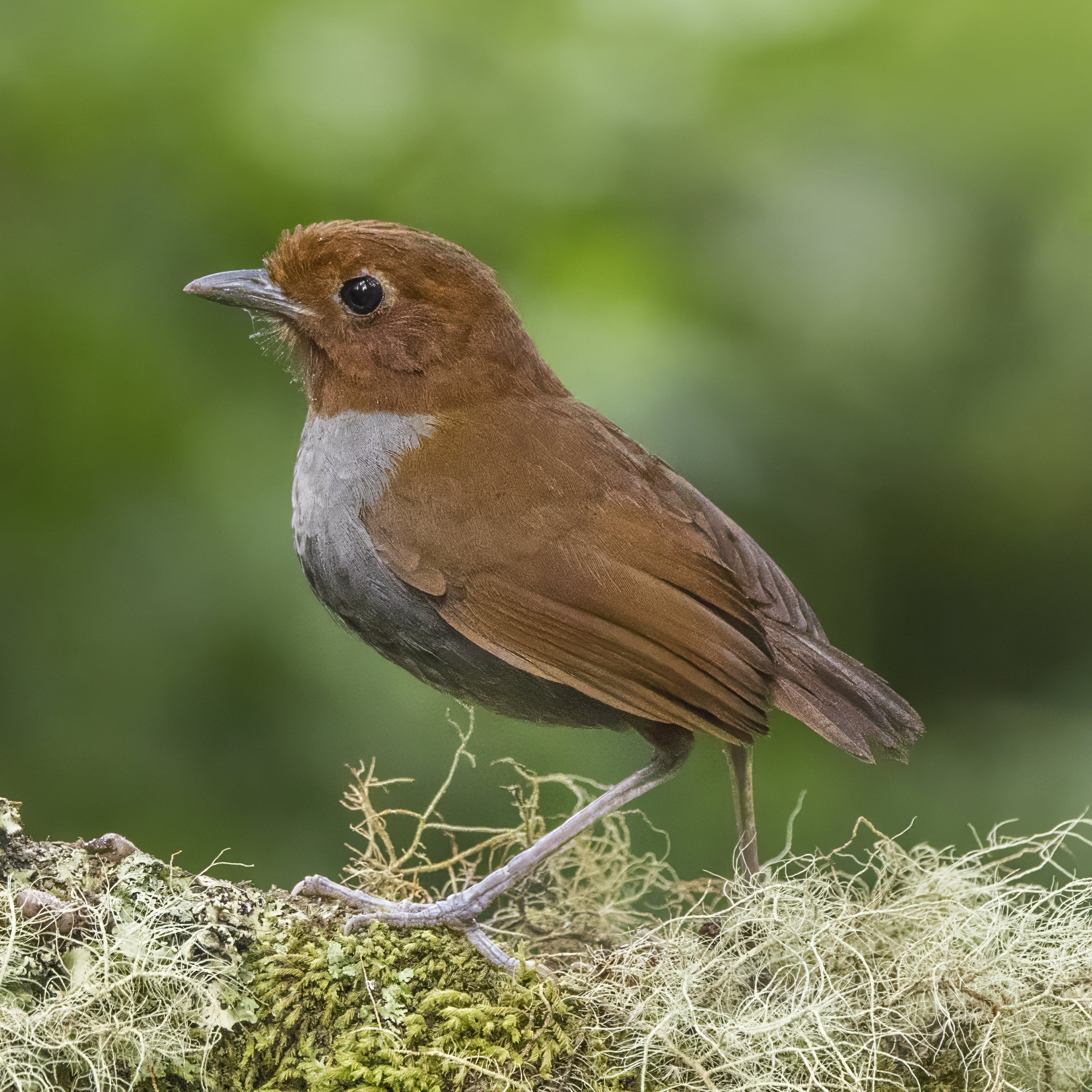
- In Caldas Department, Colombia

Conservation status
- Least Concern (IUCN 3.1)

Scientific classification
- Kingdom: Animalia
- Phylum: Chordata
- Class: Aves
- Order: Passeriformes
- Family: Grallariidae
- Genus: Grallaria
- Species complex: Grallaria rufula complex
- Species: G. rufocinerea

Binomial name
- Grallaria rufocinerea Sclater, PL & Salvin, 1879

= Bicolored antpitta =

Species of bird

The bicolored antpitta (Grallaria rufocinerea) is a species of bird in the family Grallariidae. It is found in Colombia and Ecuador.

== Taxonomy and systematics ==
Starting in 1979 the bicolored antpitta was treated as having two subspecies, the nominate G. r. rufocinerea (Sclater, PL & Salvin, 1879) and G. r. romeroana (Hernández-Camacho & Rodríguez-M, 1979). A study published in 2022 determined that the two were indistinguishable. In 2023 the Clements taxonomy disallowed romeroana and returned the bicolored antpitta to monotypic status; the International Ornithological Committee followed suit in 2024. However, BirdLife International's Handbook of the Birds of the World retains both subspecies.

The species had also been thought to be only distantly related to the then rufous antpitta (G. rufula sensu lato) but in 2020, genetic evidence revealed that the it was deeply embedded within the rufous antpitta species complex of as many as 15 species.

This article follows the monotypic species model.

== Description ==
Grallaria antpittas are a "wonderful group of plump and round antbirds whose feathers are often fluffed up...they have stout bills [and] very short tails". The bicolored antpitta is 15 to 18 cm (5.9 to 7.1 in) long; one individual weighed 44.8 g (1.6 oz). The sexes have the same plumage. Adults have a mostly rufous-brown or ferruginous red head, throat, upperparts, wings, and tail, though the throat is slightly more rufous than the rest and has some grayish mottling. Their underparts are mostly gray to sooty gray with a whitish central belly and whitish edges on the breast, side, and flank feathers. Both sexes have a dark brown iris, a black bill, and gray to brownish gray legs and feet.

== Distribution and habitat ==
The bicolored antpitta was long thought to be endemic to Colombia but in 1999 its range was discovered to extend slightly into extreme northern Ecuador's Sucumbíos Province. In Colombia the species has a disjunct distribution in the country's Central Andes. One population is found from southern Antioquia Department south into northern Tolima Department. The other is found from western Huila Department south into Ecuador. It is found in the temperate zone, where it primarily inhabits the floor and understory of humid montane cloudforest as high as treeline. It also occurs on the forest edges and in secondary forest. In elevation it ranges between 2,000 and 3,100 m (6,600 and 10,200 ft) in Colombia and is known only at about 2,250 m (7,400 ft) in Ecuador.

== Behavior ==
=== Movement ===
The bicolored antpitta is assumed to be resident throughout its range.

=== Feeding ===
The bicolored antpitta is one of several antpittas that regularly come to feeding stations set up to view them. There they are fed earthworms, which are thought to also be a large part of their natural diet. In the wild they also feed on arthropods. Their foraging behavior is not known in detail though they are assumed to be essentially terrestrial like others of the genus. They have been observed following swarms of army ants to capture prey disturbed by them, and are thought to follow large mammals such as tapirs for the same reason.

=== Breeding ===
A male bicolored antpitta in breeding condition captured in June indicates that its season includes that month. Otherwise nothing is known of the species' breeding biology.

=== Vocalization ===
The male bicolored antpitta sings "a high, clear, whistled treeeee or treeeeeuh". Females apparently answer with "a kree-kree-kree-kree-kree-kree".

== Status ==
The IUCN originally in 1988 assessed the bicolored antpitta as Threatened, then in 1994 as Endangered, in 2000 as Vulnerable, and in 2022 as being of Least Concern. Its estimated population of between 20,000 and 50,000 mature individuals is believed to be decreasing. "The species is threatened by deforestation for agriculture and human settlement. Much forest in the area has long been cleared primarily for coffee plantations, potatoes, beans and cattle-grazing, leaving scattered fragments of mature secondary forest and natural vegetation...The species nevertheless shows some tolerance of habitat degradation and disturbance and may recolonise areas from where it had previously disappeared." It does occur in at least three protected areas in Colombia.
