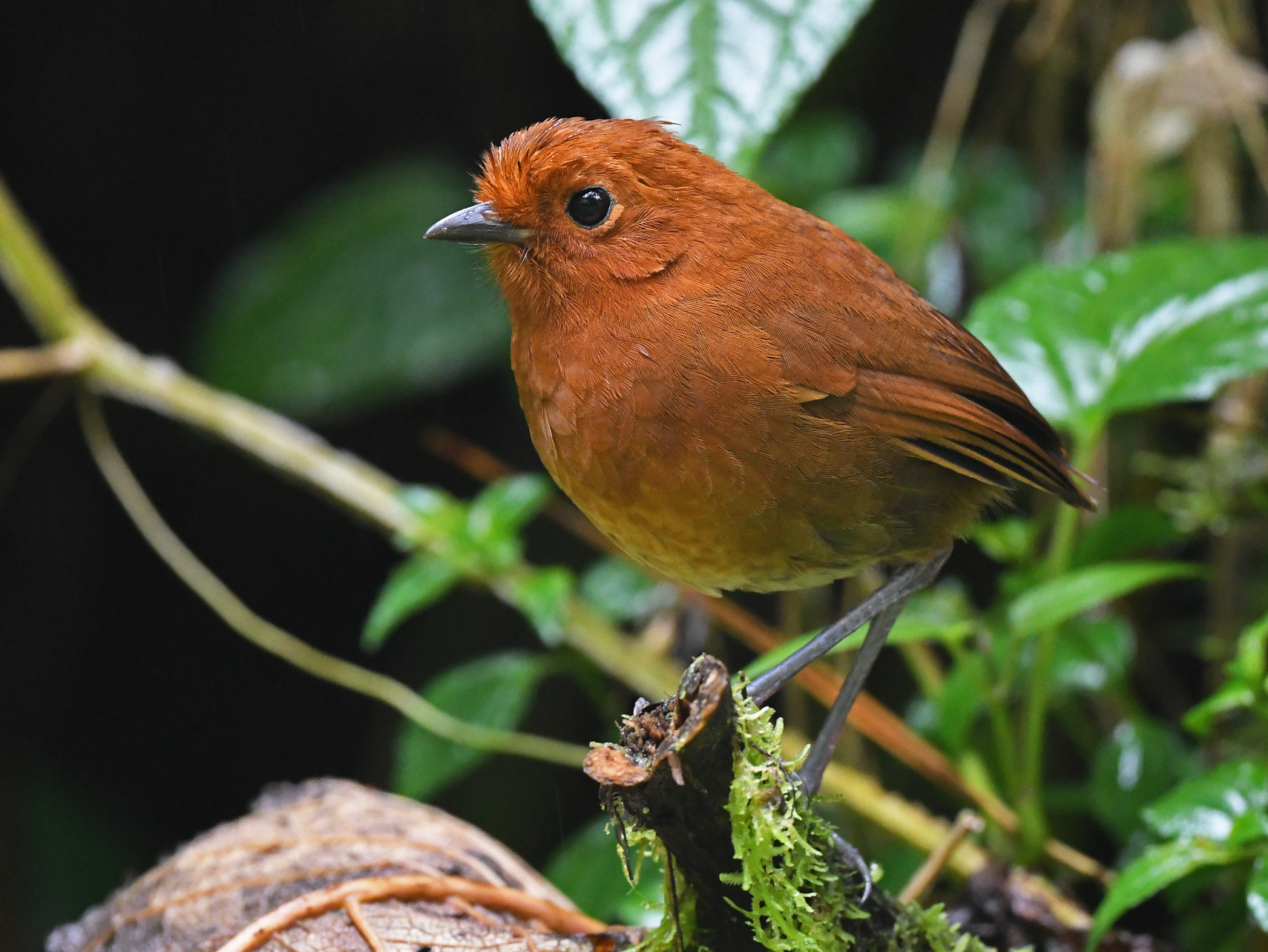

Scientific classification
- Kingdom: Animalia
- Phylum: Chordata
- Class: Aves
- Order: Passeriformes
- Family: Grallariidae
- Genus: Grallaria
- Species complex: Grallaria rufula complex
- Species: G. alvarezi

Binomial name
- Grallaria alvarezi Cuervo, Cadena, Isler & Chesser, 2020

= Chami antpitta =

Species of bird

The Chami antpitta (Grallaria alvarezi) is a species of bird in the family Grallariidae. It is endemic to Colombia.

== Taxonomy and systematics ==
What is now the Chami antpitta was thought to be an undifferentiated population of what was then the rufous antpitta (G. rufula sensu lato). Research published in 2020 showed that it was a distinct species, and another 2020 publication confirmed that it is part of the rufous antpitta species complex of some 15 species. The International Ornithological Committee and the Clements taxonomy recognized the new species in 2021. As of early 2024 BirdLife International's Handbook of the Birds of the World (HBW) had not recognized it.

The common name Chami recognizes the Embera Chamí indigenous community who inhabit the western slopes of Colombian Andes. Nymphargus chami, an endemic Colombian frog, is also named for the Chamí. The specific epithet alvarezi honors the Colombian ornithologist Mauricio Álvarez Rebolledo.

The Chami antpitta is monotypic.

== Description ==
Grallaria antpittas are a "wonderful group of plump and round antbirds whose feathers are often fluffed up...they have stout bills [and] very short tails". The Chami antpitta is about 14.5 to 15 cm (5.7 to 5.9 in) long. The sexes have the same plumage. Adults are almost entirely an intense reddish brown that is deeper on the breast. The center of their belly is a lighter buffy brown with a slight scaly pattern on its lower part. Their vent and outer tail feathers are slightly lighter than their body. Their flight feathers and wing coverts have slightly dusky inner webs. Both sexes have a dark brown iris, a dusky black maxilla, a dusky black mandible with a buffy base and a pale tip, and grayish blue legs and feet.

== Distribution and habitat ==
The Chami antpitta is endemic to the Colombia's Western Andes from Antioquia Department south to northwestern Cauca Department and possibly beyond. Its exact habitat requirements have not been documented. However, it appears to favor the floor and understory of forest that is heavy with moss and epiphytes and has stands of Chusquea bamboo. Most reports are at elevations between 2,350 and 3,650 m (7,700 and 12,000 ft).

The Cauca river separates the Chami antpitta from the closely related Equatorial antpitta (G. saturata).

== Behavior ==
=== Movement ===
The Chami antpitta is assumed to be resident throughout its range.

=== Feeding ===
The Chami antpitta's diet is not known in detail but includes arthropods, other invertebrates, and earthworms. It forages while running or hopping on the forest floor and stopping to find prey by flipping aside leaf litter and probing the soil.

=== Breeding ===
Nothing is known about the Chami antpitta's breeding biology.

=== Vocalization ===
The Chami antpitta's long song is "a rapid, slightly descending trill of short, low bandwidth notes lasting ~2.5–3.5 [seconds]". Its short song is a "quick (⁓0.4–0.5 s) vocalization that begins with a single clear note, followed by a brief pause and then a fast, accelerating trill of 4–5 notes" and has a "stuttering, vaguely purring quality". It apparently sings mostly at dawn and is assumed to do so from a low perch like many other Grallaria antpittas.

== Status ==
The IUCN follows HBW taxonomy, which does not recognize the Chami antpitta, and so has not assessed it.

== See also ==
- List of bird species described in the 2020s
