= Grey-naped antpitta =

Conservation status
- Least Concern (IUCN 3.1)

Scientific classification
- Kingdom: Animalia
- Phylum: Chordata
- Class: Aves
- Order: Passeriformes
- Family: Grallariidae
- Genus: Grallaria
- Species: G. griseonucha

Binomial name
- Grallaria griseonucha Sclater, PL & Salvin, 1871

Species of bird

The grey-naped antpitta (Grallaria griseonucha) is a species of bird in the family Grallariidae. It is endemic to Venezuela.

== Taxonomy and systematics ==
The grey-naped antpitta has two subspecies, the nominate G. g. griseonucha (Sclater, PL & Salvin, 1871) and G. g. tachirae (Zimmer, JT & Phelps WH, 1945).

== Description ==
Grallaria antpittas are a "wonderful group of plump and round antbirds whose feathers are often fluffed up...they have stout bills [and] very short tails". The grey-naped antpitta is 15 to 17 cm (5.9 to 6.7 in) long. The sexes have the same plumage. Adults of the nominate subspecies have a dark brown crown with a wide slate gray stripe under it around the head and extending down the nape. Their face below the gray is bright rufous-chestnut. Their upperparts, wings, and tail are dark reddish brown. Their underparts are mostly bright rufous-chestnut with a paler and olivaceous-tinged center to the belly. Juveniles are similar to adults with pale shafts on most of their feathers. Subspecies G. g. tachirae has a brownish olive crown, back, wings, and tail. Their throat is paler and their underparts less rufous than the nominate's. Adults of both subspecies have a brown iris, a blackish bill with some to most of the mandible paler, and gray to brownish gray legs and feet.

== Distribution and habitat ==
The grey-naped antpitta is a bird of the Venezuelan Andes. The nominate subspecies is found in south-central Mérida and eastern Trujillo states. Subspecies G. g. tachirae is found further south, mostly in northeastern Táchira state and perhaps into far southern Mérida. The species inhabits the floor and undergrowth of humid, mossy, montane forest. It favors areas with dense vegetation such as forest edges and regenerating treefalls and landslide scars. It appears to also associate with stands of Chusquea bamboo. In elevation it mostly occurs between 2,300 and 2,800 m (7,500 and 9,200 ft) but there are unconfirmed records as low as 1,800 m (5,900 ft) and as high as 3,000 m (9,800 ft).

== Behavior ==
=== Movement ===
The grey-naped antpitta is resident throughout its range.

=== Feeding ===
The grey-naped antpitta's diet and foraging behavior have not been detailed. It is assumed to feed on arthropods and earthworms captured on the forest floor like other Grallaria antpittas. It is usually seen hopping or running on the forest floor.

=== Breeding ===
Nothing is known about the grey-naped antpitta's breeding biology.

=== Vocalization ===
The grey-naped antpitta's primary song is "a rapid rising series of low whistled notes, last 2-3 loudest, wü, wü-wü-wú wu'wU'WU, with hollow quality, delivered quickly and ending abruptly". It also makes "a single whistled whü üt? at long intervals, or combined into 2s, 3s, or 4s...that may continue for several minutes". It often gives the second from a perch up to about 4 m (13 ft) above the ground.

== Status ==
The IUCN has assessed the grey-naped antpitta as being of Least Concern. It has a restricted range; its population size is not known and is believed to be stable. No immediate threats have been identified. It is considered locally fairly common to common and occurs in at least one national park.
