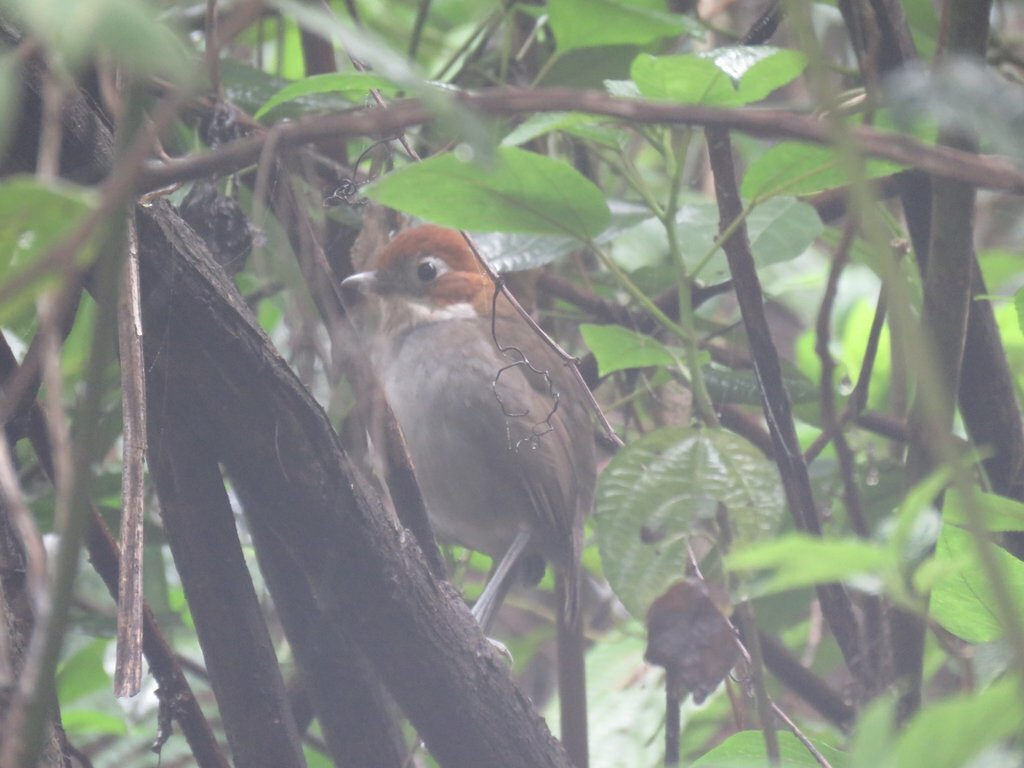

Conservation status
- Least Concern (IUCN 3.1)

Scientific classification
- Kingdom: Animalia
- Phylum: Chordata
- Class: Aves
- Order: Passeriformes
- Family: Grallariidae
- Genus: Grallaria
- Species: G. albigula

Binomial name
- Grallaria albigula Chapman, 1923

= White-throated antpitta =

Species of bird

The white-throated antpitta (Grallaria albigula) is a species of bird in the family Grallariidae. It is found in Argentina, Bolivia, and Peru.

== Taxonomy and systematics ==
The white-throated antpitta's taxonomy is unsettled. The International Ornithological Congress assigns it two subspecies, the nominate G. a. albigula (Chapman, 1923) and G. a. cinereiventris (Olrog & Contino, F, 1970). The Clements taxonomy and BirdLife International's Handbook of the Birds of the World do not recognize G. a. cinereiventris and so treat the white-throated antpitta as monotypic.

This article follows the two-subspecies model.

== Description ==
Grallaria antpittas are a "wonderful group of plump and round antbirds whose feathers are often fluffed up...they have stout bills [and] very short tails". The white-throated antpitta is 18.5 to 20 cm (7.3 to 7.9 in) long and weighs 84 to 95 g (3.0 to 3.4 oz). The sexes have the same plumage. Adults of the nominate subspecies have a bright chestnut-rufous crown, nape, and ear coverts. They have grayish lores and a ring of pale bluish white bare skin around their eye. Their upperparts are mostly olivaceous-brown with reddish brown uppertail coverts and tail. Their wings are mostly reddish brown with tawny-brown leading edges on the primaries and brownish olive upperwing coverts. Their throat is white that extends back under the ear coverts. Their breast and belly are pale gray to medium gray that is lighter on the central breast and belly; their flanks have an olive wash. Their undertail coverts are pale gray with an olive-brown wash. Subspecies G. a. cinereiventris has an entirely gray breast and belly and flanks washed with sepia-olive. Adults of both subspecies have a brown iris, a blackish gray maxilla, a blue-gray mandible, and blue-gray legs and feet.

== Distribution and habitat ==
The white-throated antpitta has a disjunct distribution. One population of the nominate subspecies is found from the Department of Cuzco in southeastern Peru southeast slightly into northwestern Bolivia. The other is found from Cochabamba Department in central Bolivia south to about the Argentina border. Subspecies G. a. cinereiventris is found in the Argentinian provinces of Jujuy and Salta. The species primarily inhabits the understory of humid montane forest. In parts of Bolivia it also is found in semi-deciduous and deciduous woodlands, shrubby and scrubby areas, and patches of bamboo. In Argentina it mostly occurs in humid temperate semi-deciduous and deciduous forest. In Peru it ranges in elevation mostly between 1,150 and 2,100 m (3,800 and 6,900 ft) though overall it ranges between 600 and 2,700 m (2,000 and 8,900 ft).

== Behavior ==
=== Movement ===
The white-throated antpitta is believed to be resident throughout its range.

=== Feeding ===
The white-throated antpitta's diet has not been detailed but is known to include insects and spiders; it probably also eats earthworms like many other Grallaria antpittas. It is almost entirely terrestrial, foraging along the ground, usually in dense vegetation.

=== Breeding ===
Nothing is known about the white-throated antpitta's breeding biology.

=== Vocalization ===
The white-throated antpitta's song is "a 2-note hollow whistle, the second note slightly higher" hee-KEE". Its call is "a descending, hollow note: clew". It also makes "a series of 3-12 faint short notes huhuhuhuhuhu".

== Status ==
The IUCN has assessed the white-throated antpitta as being of Least Concern. It has a restricted range; its population size is not known and is believed to be stable. No immediate threats have been identified. It is considered fairly common in Peru and uncommon elsewhere. It is known from protected areas in all three countries it inhabits. "Like most neotropical species, it is likely that the effects of habitat destruction, at least locally, are of major concern. It does, however, inhabit a fairly broad spectrum of habitat types and has been regularly found in areas of moderate or high disturbance."
