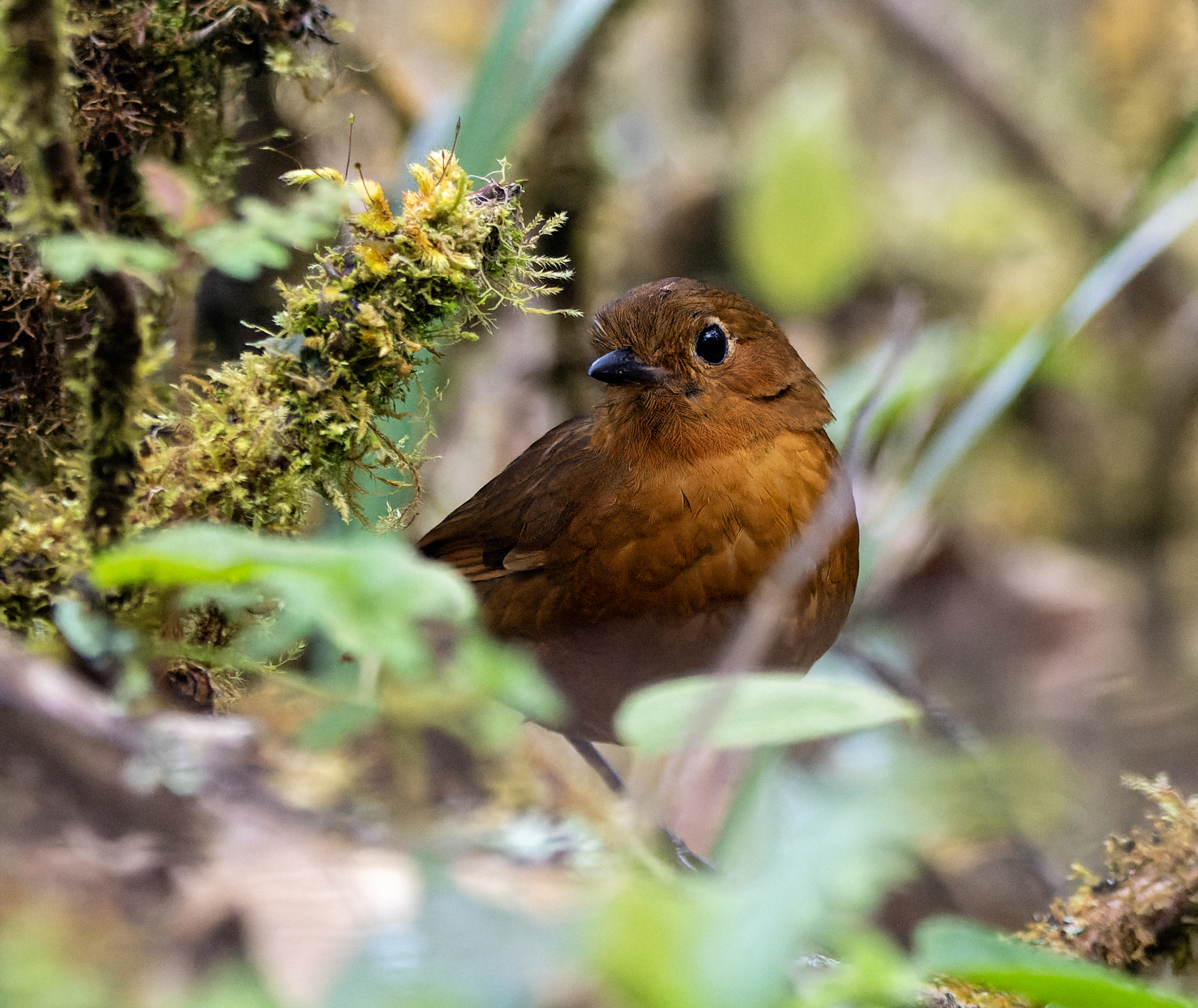

Scientific classification
- Kingdom: Animalia
- Phylum: Chordata
- Class: Aves
- Order: Passeriformes
- Family: Grallariidae
- Genus: Grallaria
- Species: G. ayacuchensis

Binomial name
- Grallaria ayacuchensis Hosner, Robbins, Isler, ML & Chesser, 2020

= Ayacucho antpitta =

Species of bird

The Ayacucho antpitta (Grallaria ayacuchensis) is a species of bird in the family Grallaridae. It is endemic to Peru.

== Taxonomy and systematics ==
The Ayacucho antpitta was formerly believed to be a population of the chestnut antpitta (Grallaria blakei). A pair of studies published in 2020 showed that it is a separate species, and it was formally described by Peter A. Hosner, Mark B. Robbins, Morton L. Isler and R. Terry Chesser. By mid-2022 the International Ornithological Committee, the Clements taxonomy, and the South American Classification Committee of the American Ornithological Society had recognized the new species. However, as of early 2024 BirdLife International's Handbook of the Birds of the World (HBW) had not recognized it.

The species' common name and specific name ayacuchensis come from the department of Ayacucho that contains the species' entire range.

The Ayacucho antpitta is monotypic.

== Description ==
The Ayacucho antpitta is about 14 to 15 cm (5.5 to 5.9 in) long; one male (the holotype) weighed 48.4 g (1.7 oz). The sexes have the same plumage. Adults have dark reddish yellow-brown crown, nape, ear coverts, upperparts, tail, and wings. Their flight feathers have slightly duskier inner vanes. Their lores, eye area, throat, breast, upper belly, sides, and upper flanks are yellowish-red brown, their lower flanks somewhat darker, their lower belly light buff with sometimes some pale gray mottling, and their undertail coverts pinkish white. They have a dark brown iris, a black bill, and dusky gray legs and feet.

== Distribution and habitat ==
The Ayacucho antpitta is confined the eastern slope of the Peruvian Andes in the department of Ayacucho. All confirmed records are west of the Apurímac River and between the Mantaro and Pampas rivers. It is separated from the closely related Oxapampa antpitta (G. centralis) by the Mantaro River and from the Urubamba antpitta (G. occabambae) by the Apurímac River. The species' habitat preferences are not fully known but appear to be the same as those of its former conspecific chestnut antpitta. That species inhabits the understory of humid montane forest and secondary forest, heavy with moss and epiphytes, where it favors stands of bamboo and other dense undergrowth. In elevation the Ayacucho antpitta occurs between 2,400 and 3,900 m (7,900 and 12,800 ft).

== Behavior ==
=== Movement ===
The Ayacucho antpitta is believed to be a year-round resident throughout its range.

=== Feeding ===
The Ayacucho antpitta's diet and foraging behavior have not been detailed; it is known to eat insects and is assumed to eat other arthropods and perhaps small vertebrates as do other members of genus Grallaria . It is known to forage on or very near the ground.

=== Breeding ===
Nothing definitive is known about the Ayacucho antpitta's breeding biology.

=== Vocalization ===
The Ayacucho antpitta's vocalizations were part of the evidence used to define it as a species. Its "trilled long song" is "a fast series of short, clear, slightly downslurred ringing notes at ca. 2.5 kHz and lasting ca. 1.7-2.5 s. The first few notes are very slightly higher in pitch, and the overall duration of individual notes shortens slightly towards the end of the song". Its short song is "a single short, clear downslurred note with a vaguely ringing quality, falling from ca. 2.3 to 1.4 kHz and lasting ca. 0.15 s". Both are subtly different from those of the Oxapampa antpitta. The species is most vocal at dawn and in the early morning. It typically sings from a low perch.

== Status ==
The IUCN follows HBW taxonomy and so has not assessed the Ayacucho antpitta separately from the chestnut antpitta. "The primary threat, at least in the short term, to Ayacucho Antpitta, is habitat destruction primarily through clearing for crops and grazing."

== See also ==
- List of bird species described in the 2020s
