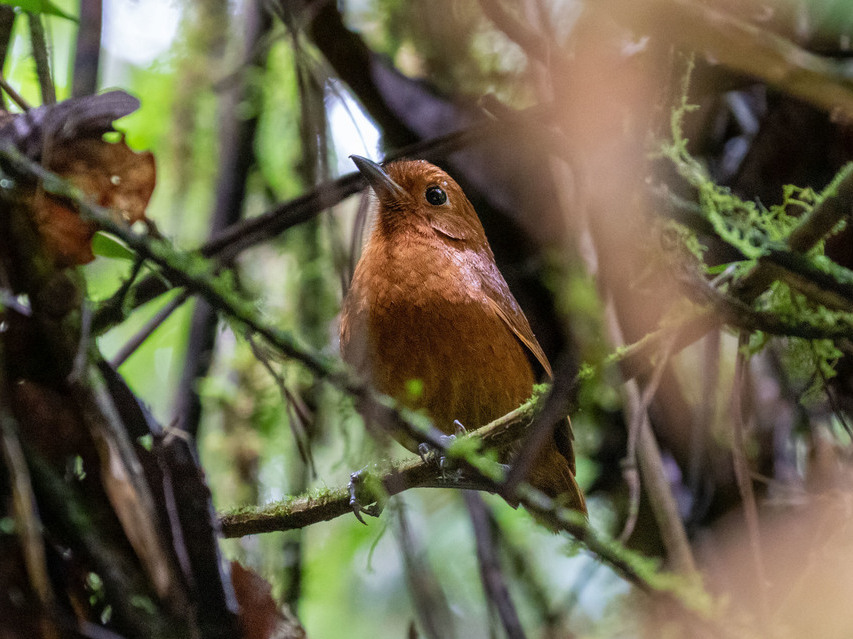

Scientific classification
- Kingdom: Animalia
- Phylum: Chordata
- Class: Aves
- Order: Passeriformes
- Family: Grallariidae
- Genus: Grallaria
- Species: G. centralis

Binomial name
- Grallaria centralis Hosner, Robbins, Isler, ML & Chesser, 2020

= Oxapampa antpitta =

Species of bird

The Oxapampa antpitta (Grallaria centralis) is a species of bird in the family Grallariidae. It is endemic to Peru.

== Taxonomy and systematics ==
The Oxapampa antpitta was formerly believed to be a population of the chestnut antpitta (Grallaria blakei). A pair of studies published in 2020 showed that it is a separate species, and it was formally described by Peter A. Hosner, Mark B. Robbins, Morton L. Isler and R. Terry Chesser. By mid-2022 the International Ornithological Committee, the Clements taxonomy, and the South American Classification Committee of the American Ornithological Society had recognized the new species. However, as of early 2024 BirdLife International's Handbook of the Birds of the World (HBW) had not recognized it.

The species' common name reflects the Oxapampa province where specimens of the species were first collected. The specific name centralis reflects its range's proximity to the geographic center of Peru.

The Oxapampa antpitta is monotypic.

== Description ==
The Oxapampa antpitta is about 14 to 15 cm (5.5 to 5.9 in) long; one female (the holotype) weighed 40.5 g (1.4 oz). The sexes have the same plumage. Adults have dark reddish brown head and upperparts. Their throat, breast, sides, and flanks are yellowish-red brown, their belly center yellower, their lower belly light buff with sometimes some pale gray mottling, and their undertail coverts like the belly center. They have a dark brown iris, a black bill, and blackish to dark gray legs and feet.

== Distribution and habitat ==
The Oxapampa antpitta is endemic to the eastern slope of the Peruvian Andes from the Huallaga River in Huánaco Department south through Pasco Department into Junín Department north of the Mantaro River. This last separates it from the closely related Ayacucho antpitta (G. ayacuchensis). The species' habitat preferences are not fully known but appear to be the same as those of its former conspecific chestnut antpitta. That species inhabits the understory of humid montane forest and secondary forest where it favors stands of bamboo and other dense undergrowth. In elevation the Oxapampa antpitta occurs between 2,400 and 2,700 m (7,900 and 8,900 ft).

== Behavior ==
=== Movement ===
The Oxapampa antpitta is believed to be a year-round resident throughout its range.

=== Feeding ===
The Oxapampa antpitta's diet and foraging behavior have not been detailed; it is known to eat insects and is assumed to eat other arthropods and perhaps small vertebrates as do other members of genus Grallaria . It is known to forage on or very near the ground.

=== Breeding ===
Nothing definitive is known about the Oxapampa antpitta's breeding biology.

=== Vocalization ===
The Oxapampa antpitta's vocalizations were part of the evidence used to define it as a species. Its "trilled long song" is " a fast series of short, clear, slightly downslurred ringing notes at c 2.5 kHz and lasting c 1.7-2.5s. The first few notes are very slightly higher in pitch, and the overall duration of individual notes remains constant or lengthens slightly." Its "short song" is "a single short, clear overslurred to slightly downslurred note with a vaguely ringing quality, falling from c 2.3 to 1.4 kHz and lasting c 0.15s". Both are subtly different from those of the Ayacucho antpitta. The species is most vocal at dawn and in the early morning. It typically sings from a low perch.

== Status ==
The IUCN follows HBW taxonomy and so has not assessed the Oxapampa antpitta separately from the chestnut antpitta. "Considering that the geographic range of the present species is even smaller than that considered for the Chestnut Antpitta (sensu lato), and in the face of suspected population declines due to ongoing habitat loss for most birds in that region...the Oxapampa Antpitta undoubtedly deserves a rating of Near Threatened or higher."

== See also ==
- List of bird species described in the 2020s
