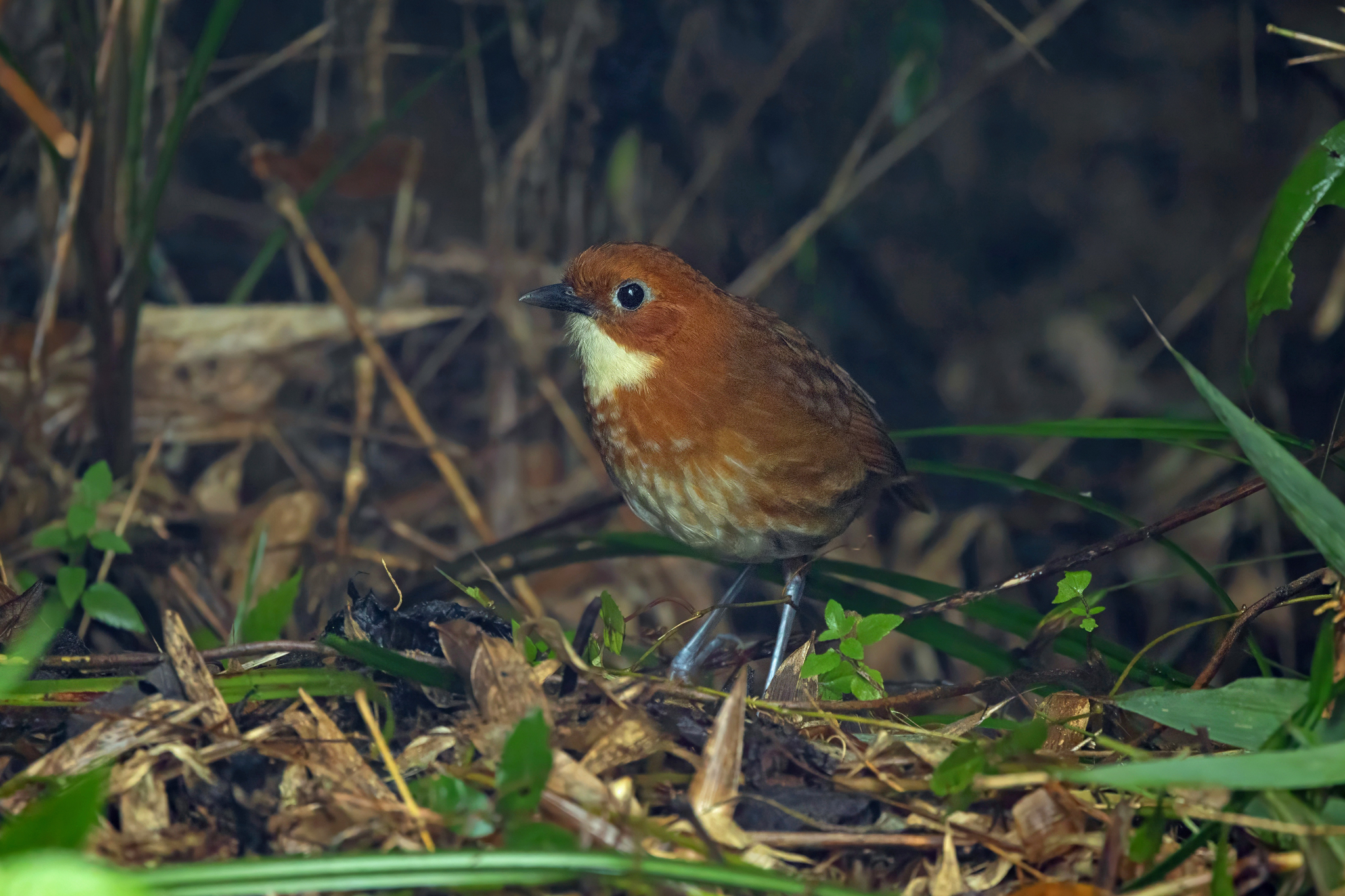

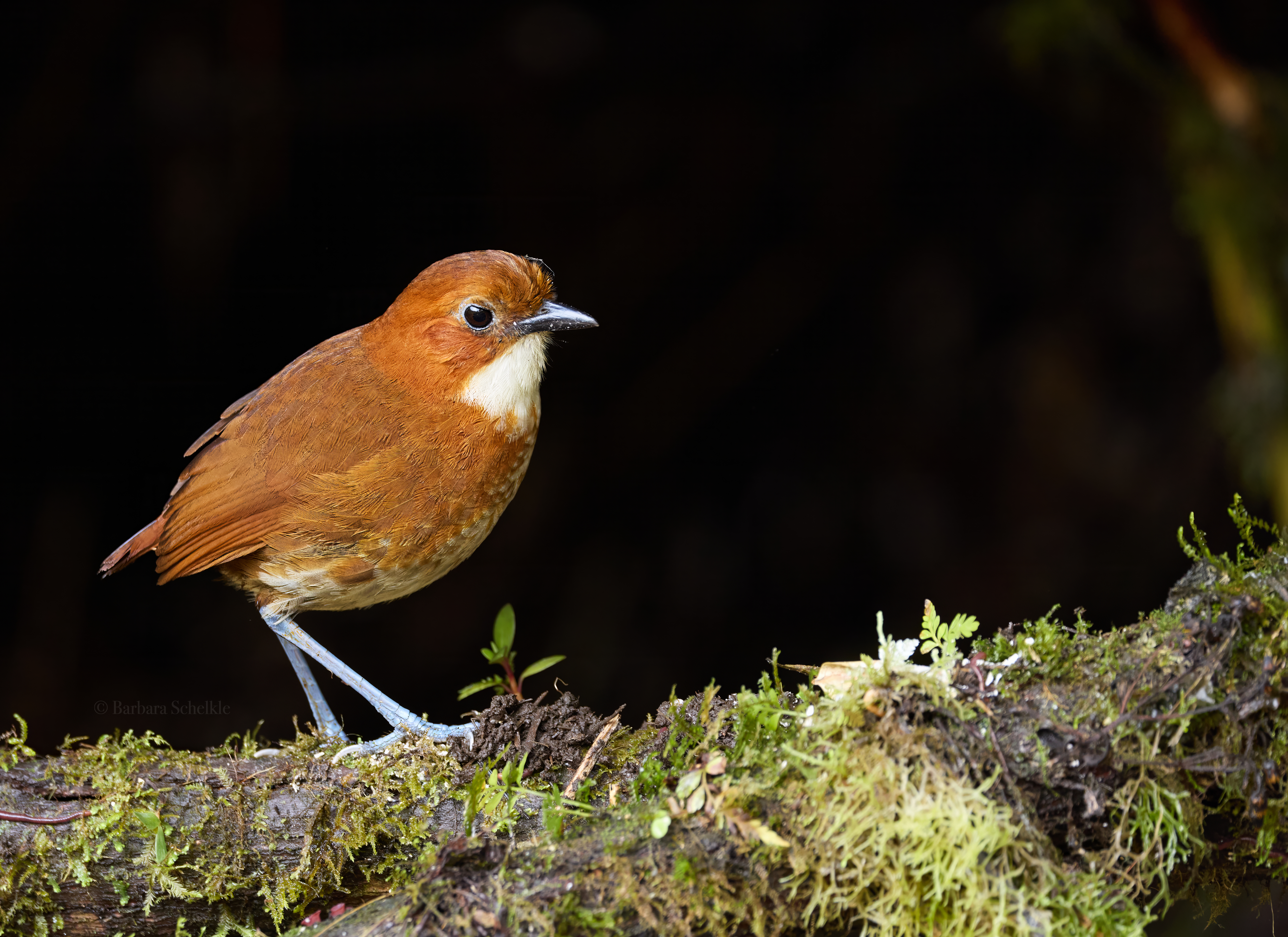

Conservation status
- Least Concern (IUCN 3.1)

Scientific classification
- Kingdom: Animalia
- Phylum: Chordata
- Class: Aves
- Order: Passeriformes
- Family: Grallariidae
- Genus: Grallaria
- Species: G. erythroleuca

Binomial name
- Grallaria erythroleuca Sclater, PL, 1874

= Red-and-white antpitta =

Species of bird

The red-and-white antpitta (Grallaria erythroleuca) is a species of bird in the family Grallariidae. It is endemic to Peru.

== Taxonomy and systematics ==
The red-and-white antpitta was described in 1874 as a species. In 1970 at least one author treated it as a subspecies of the white-bellied antpitta (G. hypoleuca) but by the late twentieth century it was restored to species status.

It is monotypic. However, the population in the Cordillera Vilcabamba differs from the rest in some characteristics and might be an undescribed subspecies.

== Description ==
Grallaria antpittas are a "wonderful group of plump and round antbirds whose feathers are often fluffed up...they have stout bills [and] very short tails". The red-and-white antpitta is 17 to 18 cm (6.7 to 7.1 in) long and weighs 73 to 80 g (2.6 to 2.8 oz). The sexes have the same plumage. Adults have a bright rich rufous crown and nape. Many have a ring of bare grayish or bluish gray skin around their eye. Their back, rump, wings, and tail are a slightly duller and browner rufous than their crown and nape. Their throat and the center of their belly are white; the latter is yellow in the Cordillera de Vilcabamba. The sides of their breast are rufous-brown, and this color with some white mottling forms a band across the breast. Their flanks are rufous-brown with an olive wash. Juveniles are similar to adults but have a buffier hindcrown and nape with fine blackish bars. Their wing coverts and breast band are paler than the adult's. Adults have a medium brown iris, a black bill, and slate-gray to blue-gray legs and feet. Juveniles have a black maxilla with a yellow tip and a yellowish mandible; their iris and leg colors have not been described.

== Distribution and habitat ==
The red-and-white antpitta is found on the east side of the Peruvian Andes, mostly in Cuzco Department and slightly into Junín and Ayacucho departments. It inhabits the understory in the interior and edges of humid subtropical montane forest and mature secondary forest. It appears to favor areas where thick vegetation is regrowing such as in landslide scars, and is also associated with Chusquea bamboo stands. In elevation it mostly ranges between 2,100 and 3,000 m (6,900 and 9,800 ft) though there are records as low as 1,758 m (5,800 ft) and as high as 3,400 m (11,200 ft).

== Behavior ==
=== Movement ===
The red-and-white antpitta is believed to be resident throughout its range but might make some seasonal elevation movements.

=== Feeding ===
The red-and-white antpitta's diet has not been detailed but it is known to feed on insects and spiders. It is almost entirely terrestrial, where it runs and hops along the ground and up to about 1.5 m (5 ft) above it, usually in dense vegetation. It typically lunges to capture prey from leaf litter and other substrates.

=== Breeding ===
The red-and-white antpitta is thought to breed between January and May. Nothing else is known about its breeding biology.

=== Vocalization ===
The red-and-white antpitta typically sings from a low perch. In most of its range its song is "a 3-note hollow whistle with the first note highest, the second 2 monotone: HEE hew-hew". In the Cordillera Vilcabamba it sings four notes: "heep hew-hew-hew". Its calls "include a series of plaintive, descending clew notes".

== Status ==
The IUCN has assessed the red-and-white antpitta as being of Least Concern. It has a small range; its population size is not known and is believed to be stable. No immediate threats have been identified. It is considered uncommon to fairly common. It occurs in several protected areas. "Given that the species occupies regenerating habitats, it may even benefit, locally and in the short term, from human activities, such as low-level clearance for subsistence agriculture. In the longer term, habitat destruction could pose a significant threat, in view of the species' small geographic range, although currently much of this area lacks roads and has a low human population density."
