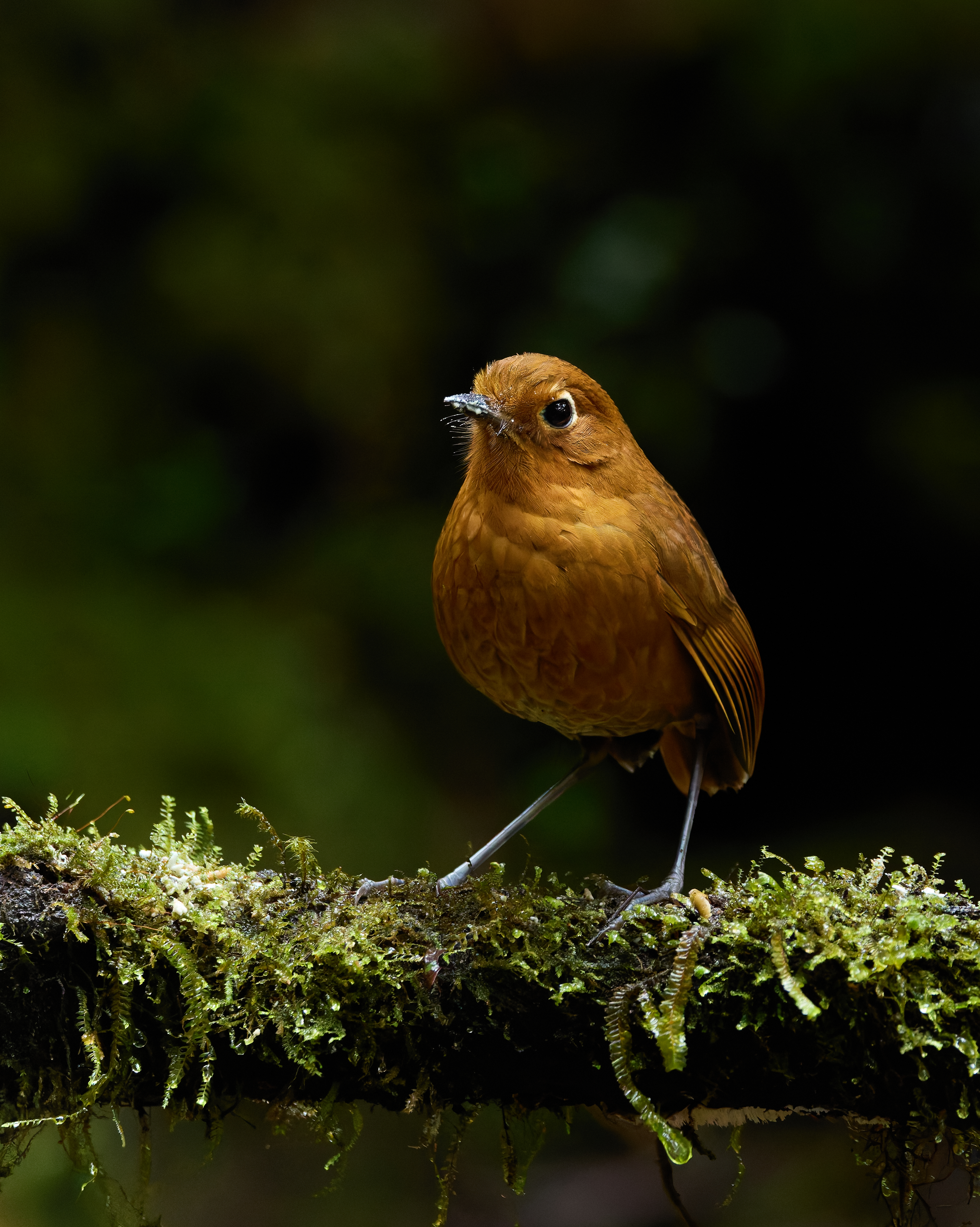

Scientific classification
- Kingdom: Animalia
- Phylum: Chordata
- Class: Aves
- Order: Passeriformes
- Family: Grallariidae
- Genus: Grallaria
- Species complex: Grallaria rufula complex
- Species: G. occabambae

Binomial name
- Grallaria occabambae (Chapman, 1923)

Subspecies
- G. o. occabambae Chapman, 1923; G. o. marcapatensis Isler & Chesser, 2020

Synonyms
- Grallaria rufula occabambae (Chapman, 1923)

= Urubamba antpitta =

Species of bird

The Urubamba antpitta (Grallaria occabambae) is a bird in the family Grallariidae. The species was first described as a subspecies by Frank Chapman in 1923. It is endemic to Peru. It is a member of the rufous antpitta species complex and was elevated from subspecies to species in 2020 on the basis of differences in plumage and vocalization. The same study also described a new subspecies of Urubamba antpitta (G. o. marcapatensis).

== Taxonomy ==
The Urubamba antpitta was first described as a subspecies of rufous antpitta in 1923, but a 2020 study found that differences in plumage and vocalizations warrant elevation to species.

There are two subspecies of Urubamba antpitta: G. o. occabambae and G. o. marcapatensis. They are distinguishable by minor plumage differences and differences in song.

The common name was given by Charles B. Cory and Carl Edward Hellmayr in 1924 and is named for the type locality of the species: Urubamba, Peru. The subspecies' specific name, marcapatensis, comes from for the Marcapata district where the type specimen was found.

== Distribution and habitat ==
The Urubamba antpitta is endemic to the Peruvian departments of Junín and Cusco. Subspecies G. o. occabambae is found west of the Yanatili river valley, and subspecies G. o. marcapatensis is found to the Yanatili's east. It inhabits humid montane forest and prefers the understory or forest floor. It is found at elevations of 2,450–3,650 m.

The Urubamba antpitta is separated from the closely related Ayacucho antpitta by the Apurímac river.
