= Consata River =

Location
- Country: Bolivia

The Consata River is a river of Bolivia.

== See also ==
- List of rivers of Bolivia
