= Serranía de Los Motilones =

- Location within Colombia

Geography
- Countries: Colombia and Venezuela
- Range coordinates: 9°48′10″N 72°57′9″W
- Parent range: Cordillera Oriental

The Serranía de Los Motilones is a mountain range in the Cordillera Oriental of Colombia and Venezuela. A forest reserve zone exists within the range and spans 998,581 hectares (2,467,550 acres).
