= Huancabamba River =

River in Peru

Coordinates: 10.393°S 75.551°W

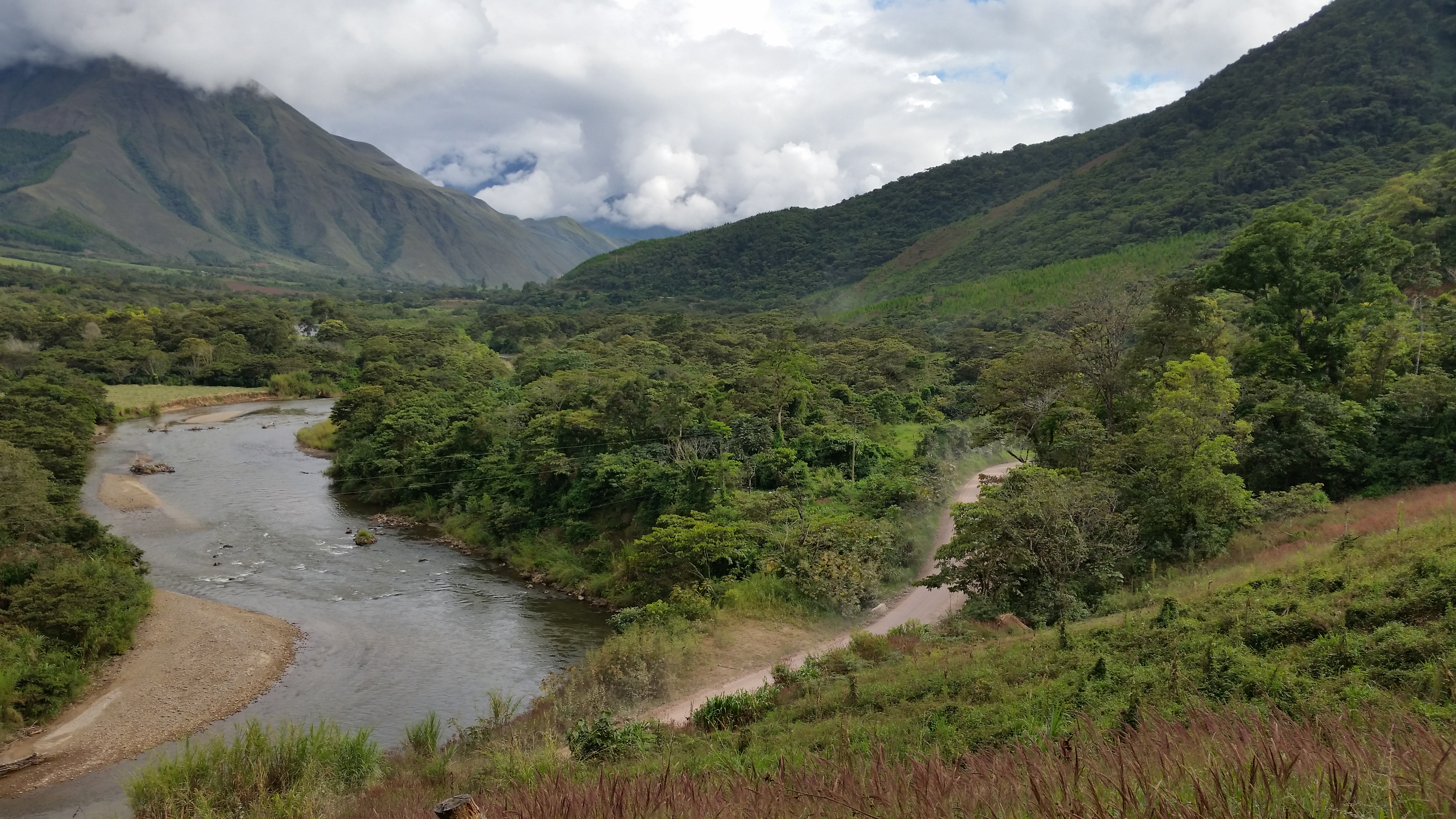
Huancabamba River, Oxapampa.

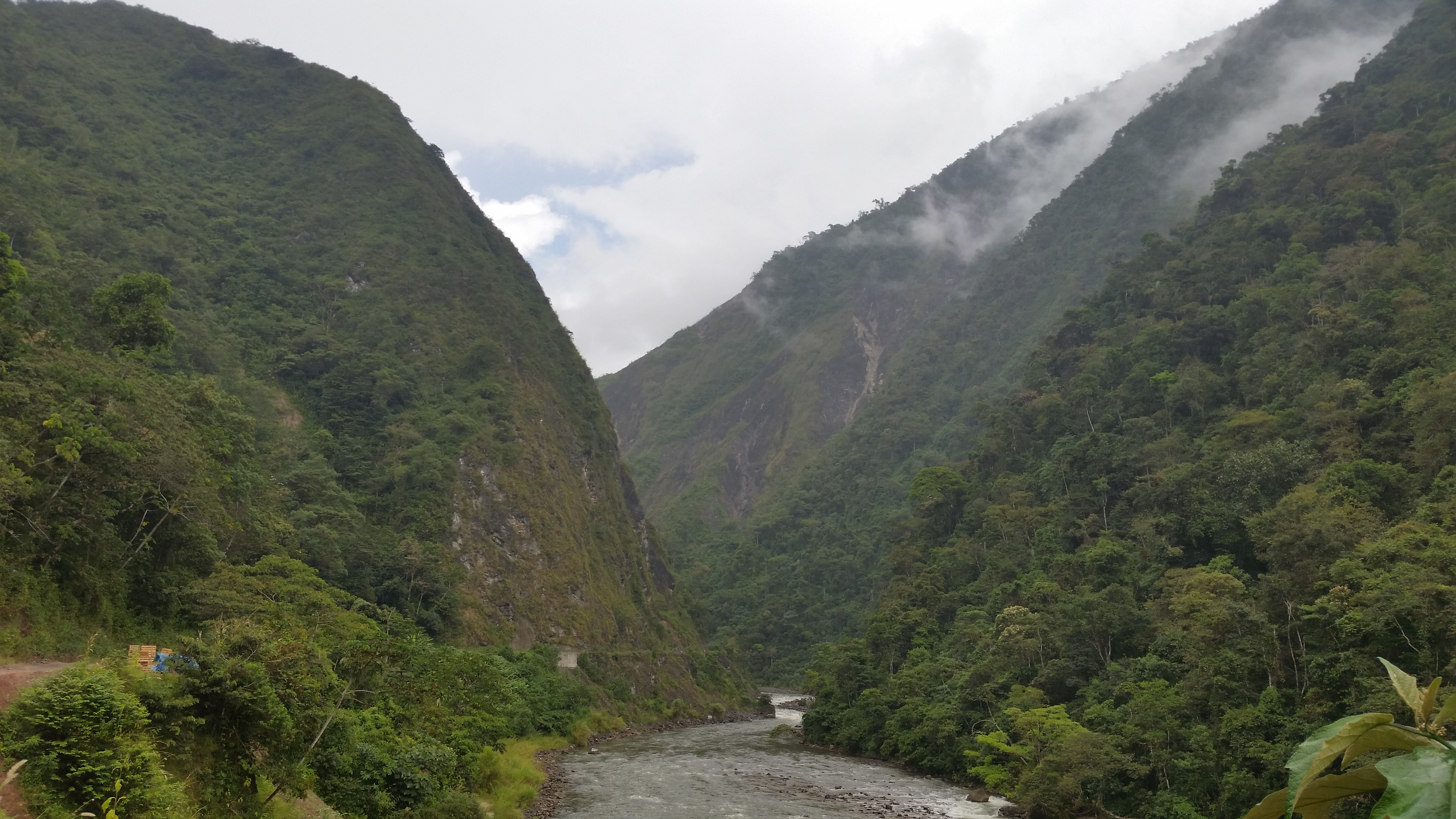
Huancabamba Canyon north of Huancabamba village.

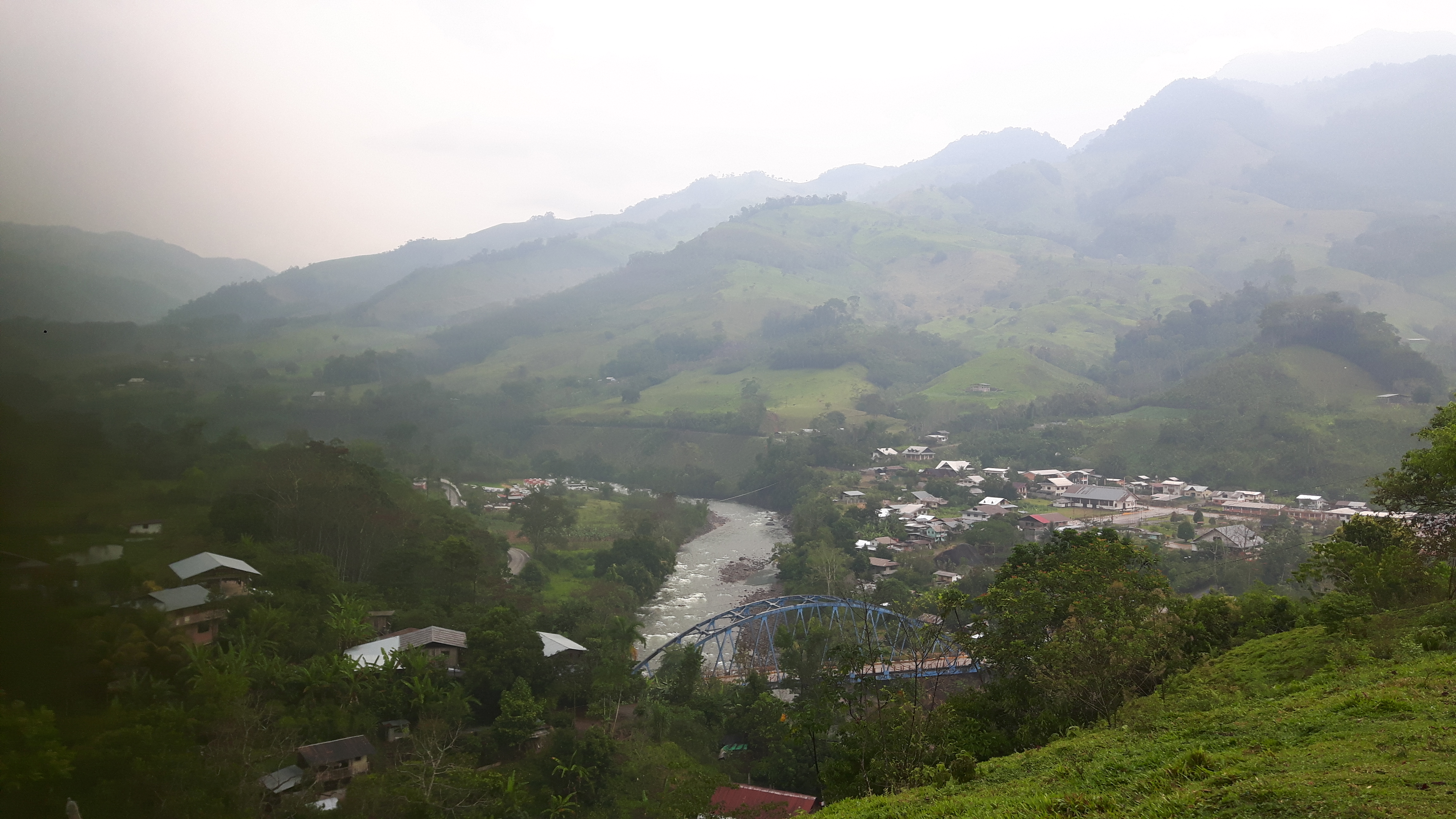
The village of Prusia and the Huancabamba River.

The Huancabamba River ("Stony Plain" in the Quechua language) in the Pasco Region of Peru has its origin in the confluence of several small rivers near the town of Oxapampa: the Chontabamba, the Llamaquizú, and the Esperanza rivers. From an elevation of 1,807 metres (5,928 ft) at Oxapampa, the Huancabamba River runs northward for approximately 77 kilometres (48 mi) by road paralleling the river to the village of Pozuzo. The Huancabamba is joined by the Santa Cruz River 4 kilometres (2.5 miles) north of Pozuzo at an elevation of 700 metres (2,300 ft) and thereafter is called the Pozuzo River. In its lower course the Pozuzó is called the Pachitea River which joins the Ucayali River, a major component in the Amazon River drainage basin.

The Huancabamba runs in steep canyons for part of its course and with mountains on either side rising to more than 3,000 metres (9,800 ft) in elevation. A few kilometres of the river above Pozuzo is within the Yanachaga–Chemillén National Park. The river is located in the ecological zone of the Peruvian Yungas, or Ceja de Selva ("eyebrow of the jungle"), the transition zone between the low jungles of the Amazon Basin and the Andes highlands.

The narrow valley of the Huancabamba was first settled by Europeans in the 19th century by colonists from Austria and Germany. The area retains traces of Germanic culture and architecture. Prior to the arrival of the Europeans the Huancabamba area was inhabited by the Yanesha (Amuesa) people.
