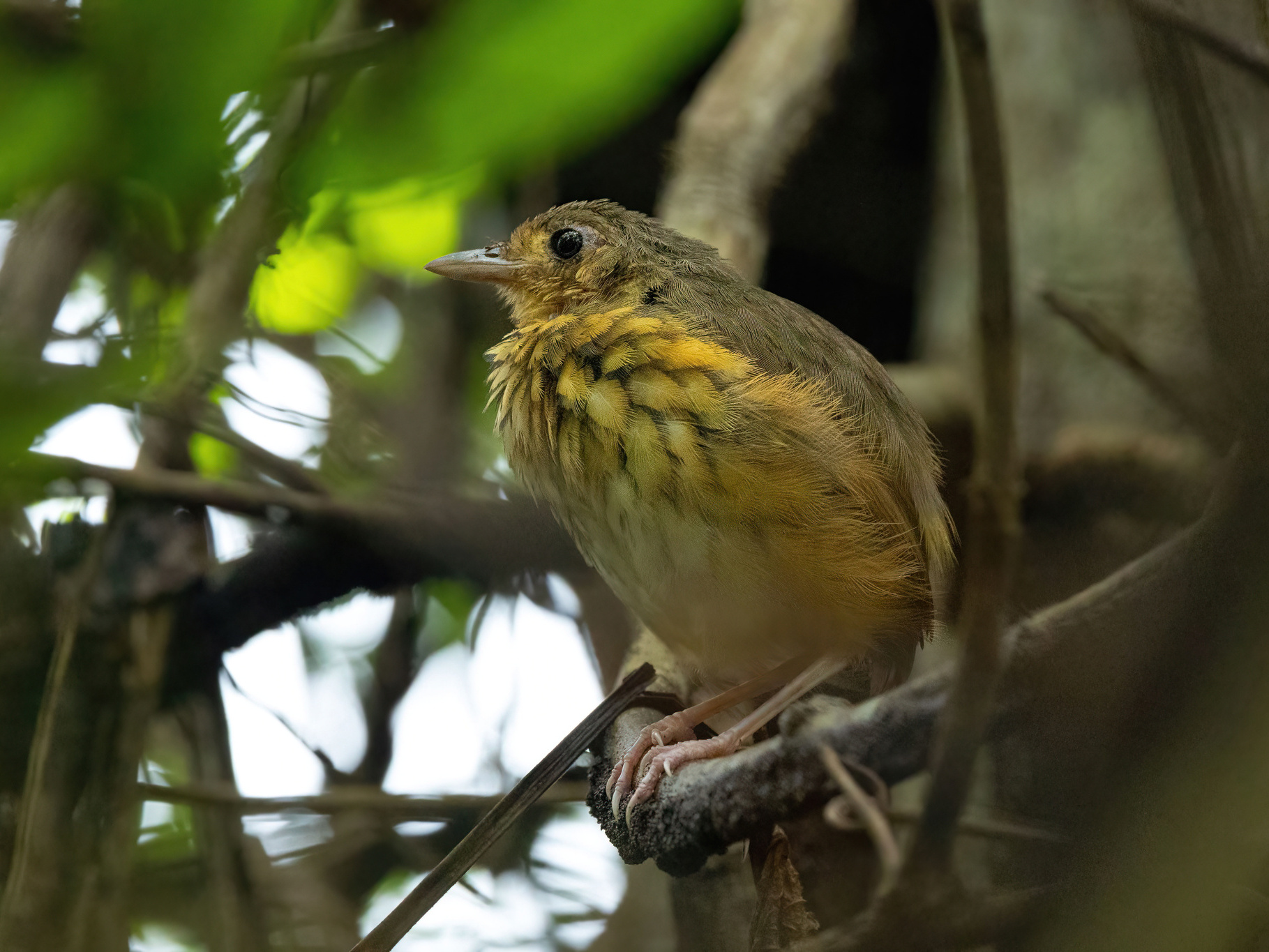

Conservation status
- Least Concern (IUCN 3.1)

Scientific classification
- Kingdom: Animalia
- Phylum: Chordata
- Class: Aves
- Order: Passeriformes
- Family: Grallariidae
- Genus: Myrmothera
- Species: M. berlepschi

Binomial name
- Myrmothera berlepschi (Hellmayr, 1903)

= Amazonian antpitta =

Species of bird

The Amazonian antpitta (Myrmothera berlepschi) is a species of bird in the family Grallariidae. It is found in Bolivia, Brazil, and Peru.

== Taxonomy and systematics ==
The Amazonian antpitta was originally described in 1903 as Grallaria berlepschi. It was later transferred to genus Hylopezus and still later to Myrmothera.

The Amazonian antpitta has two subspecies, the nominate M. b. berlepschi (Hellmayr, 1903), and M. b. yessupi (Carriker, 1930).

== Description ==
The Amazonian antpitta is 14.5 to 15 cm (5.7 to 5.9 in) long; males weigh 46 to 54 g (1.6 to 1.9 oz) and females 36 to 49 g (1.3 to 1.7 oz). The sexes have the same plumage. Adults of the nominate subspecies have a buffy loral spot and pinkish red bare skin around their eye. Their crown, nape, ear coverts, upperparts, and tail are olive-brown. Their wings are mostly olive-brown with olive-buff outer webs on the primaries. Their throat is white. Their breast and sides are buffy ochraceous with coarse dusky streaks, their belly white, and their flanks and crissum orange-rufous. Subspecies M. b. yessupi has slightly browner and darker upperparts and slightly deeper buff underparts than the nominate. Both subspecies have a brown iris, a dusky gray maxilla, a pinkish white mandible with a dusky tip, and bright pink legs and feet.

== Distribution and habitat ==
As its English name implies, the Amazonian antpitta is a bird of the Amazon Basin. The nominate subspecies has the larger range of the two. It is found in Brazil from the upper Purus River northeast to Pará where it occurs between the Tapajós and Xingu rivers, and south and west into northern Mato Grosso state, southeastern Peru, and north-central Bolivia. Subspecies M. b. yessupi is found from the southern part of Peru's Department of Loreto south through Ucayali and most of Madre de Dios departments and east slightly into western Brazil. The species inhabits the floor and dense undergrowth of riparian forest, mature secondary forest, and the edges of primary forest. In elevation it mostly occurs below 500 m (1,600 ft) but reaches 700 m (2,300 ft) locally in Peru.

== Behavior ==
=== Movement ===
The Amazonian antpitta is believed to be a year-round resident throughout its range.

=== Feeding ===
The Amazonian antpitta's diet has not been detailed but is known to include insects. It is usually seen singly as it forages while running, hopping, and walking on the forest floor and downed logs.

=== Breeding ===
Nothing is known about the Amazonian antpitta's breeding biology.

=== Vocalization ===
The Amazonian antpitta's song is "a series of 3-5 deep, hollow hoots: coop coop coop". Its call is "a rapid series of hooting notes: KEW'hoo'hoo'hoo'hoo".

== Status ==
The IUCN has assessed the Amazonian antpitta as being of Least Concern. It has a large range; its population size is not known and is believed to be stable. No immediate threats have been identified. It is considered generally uncommon and rare to uncommon in Peru. It occurs in several protected areas.
