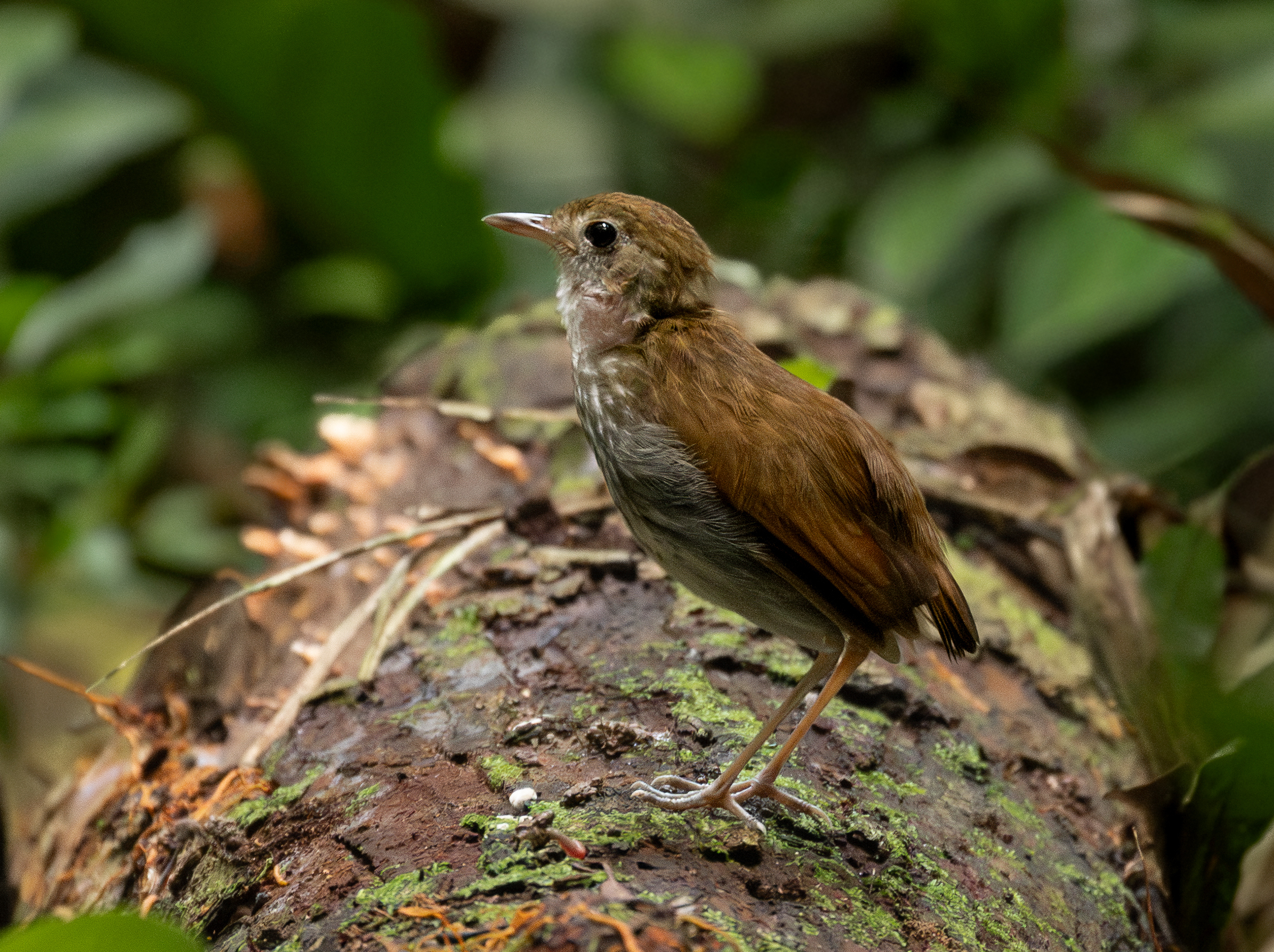

Conservation status
- Least Concern (IUCN 3.1)

Scientific classification
- Kingdom: Animalia
- Phylum: Chordata
- Class: Aves
- Order: Passeriformes
- Family: Grallariidae
- Genus: Myrmothera
- Species: M. subcanescens

Binomial name
- Myrmothera subcanescens Todd, 1927

Synonyms
- Myrmothera campanisona subcanescens

= Tapajos antpitta =

Species of bird

The Tapajos antpitta (Myrmothera subcanescens) is a species of bird in the family Grallariidae. It is endemic to Brazil.

== Taxonomy and systematics ==
The Tapajos antpitta was originally described in 1927 as a subspecies of the thrush-like antpitta (Myrmothera campanisona). Beginning in 2018 taxonomic systems recognized it as a separate species, though BirdLife International's Handbook of the Birds of the World did not do so until 2024.

The Tapajos antpitta is monotypic.

== Description ==
The Tapajos antpitta is about 14.5 to 15 cm (5.7 to 5.9 in) long and is thought to weigh between about 55 and 60 g (1.9 and 2.1 oz). The sexes have the same plumage. Adults have a small white spot behind their eye. Most of the rest of their face is brown with slightly paler and grayer lores. Their crown, nape, upperparts, wings, and tail are brown. Their throat and underparts are white. Their breast has grayish brown streaks and their sides and flanks have an olive-gray wash. They have a dark brown iris, a dusky black maxilla, a pinkish yellow mandible with a black tip, and pale pinkish legs and feet.

== Distribution and habitat ==
The Tapajos antpitta is found in the Amazon Basin of central Brazil, south of the Amazon and east of the Madeira River. Its range extends east past the Tapajos River to the lower Xingu River and south into Rondônia, southern Pará, and northern Mato Grosso. It inhabits humid rainforest in the lowlands. It favors areas with a dense understory such as openings caused by tree-fall, regrowing clearings, edges along roads, and especially edges along watercourses.

== Behavior ==
=== Movement ===
The Tapajos antpitta is believed to be a year-round resident throughout its range.

=== Feeding ===
The Tapajos antpitta's diet and foraging behavior have not been detailed but are assumed to be like those of other Myrmothera antpittas. They are highly terrestrial and feed mostly on arthropods.

=== Breeding ===
Nothing is known about the Tapajos antpitta's breeding biology.

=== Vocalization ===
The Tapajos antpitta's song is "a slightly rising series of 5–8 similar-sounding, hollow notes, gradually increasing in volume and rising steadily in pitch". Its call is "a low rattle or churr".

== Status ==
The IUCN has assessed the Tapajos antpitta as being of Least Concern. It has a large range; its population size is not known and is believed to be decreasing. "Due to its susceptibility to forest fragmentation, the species is threatened by the large-scale logging of forests for agricultural expansion." It occurs in several protected areas.
