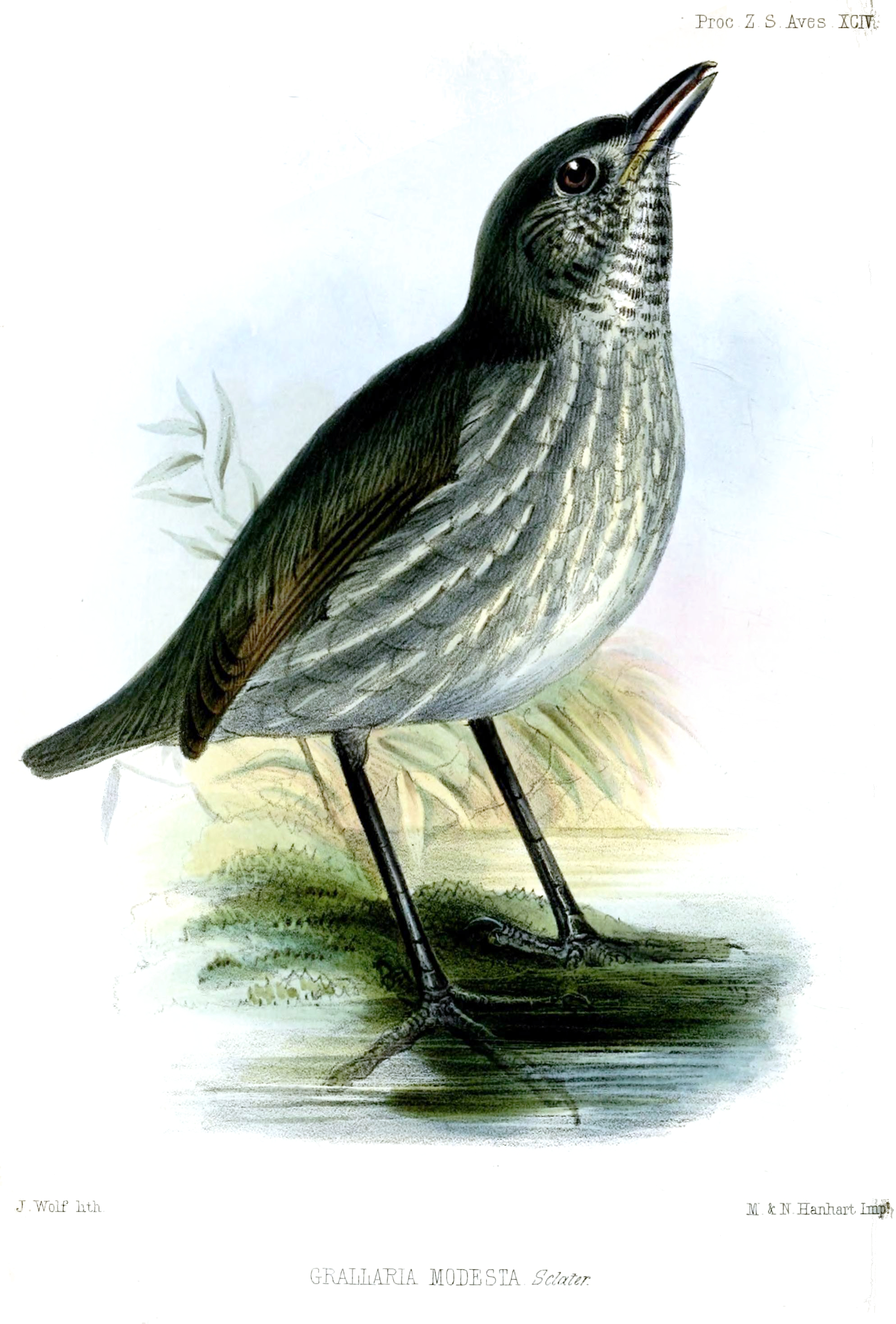

Conservation status
- Least Concern (IUCN 3.1)

Scientific classification
- Kingdom: Animalia
- Phylum: Chordata
- Class: Aves
- Order: Passeriformes
- Family: Grallariidae
- Genus: Myrmothera
- Species: M. campanisona

Binomial name
- Myrmothera campanisona (Hermann, 1783)

Synonyms
- Grallaria modesta

= Thrush-like antpitta =

Species of bird

The thrush-like antpitta (Myrmothera campanisona) is a species of bird in the antpitta family Grallariidae. It is native to Amazonia.

== Taxonomy and systematics ==
The thrush-like antpitta was described in 1778 by the French polymath Comte de Buffon in his Histoire Naturelle des Oiseaux. Buffon used the French name "Le grand Béfroi". A hand-colored engraving was published separately to accompany Buffon's description. Buffon did not introduce scientific names but 1783 the French naturalist Johann Hermann coined the binomial name Myrmornin campanisonam for Buffon's bird. The specific epithet campanisona combines the Late Latin campana meaning "bell" with the Latin sonus meaning "sounding". The thrush-like antpitta was known under a large number of scientific names before arriving in genus Myrmothera that was introduced in 1816 by Louis Pierre Vieillot.

The thrush-like antpitta has these five subspecies:

- M. c. modesta (Sclater, PL, 1855)
- M. c. dissors Zimmer, JT, 1934
- M. c. campanisona (Hermann, 1783)
- M. c. signata Zimmer, JT, 1934
- M. c. minor (Taczanowski, 1882)

What is now the Tapajos antpitta (M. subcanescens) was previously treated as a sixth subspecies. Beginning in 2018 taxonomic systems implemented the split, though BirdLife International's Handbook of the Birds of the World did not do so until 2024.

== Description ==
The thrush-like antpitta is about 14.5 to 15 cm (5.7 to 5.9 in) long and weighs between 39.5 and 64 g (1.4 and 2.3 oz). The sexes have the same plumage and the subspecies differ little from each other. Adults of the nominate subspecies M. c. campanisona have a small white spot behind their eye. Most of the rest of their face is rufous-brown with slightly paler and grayer lores. Their crown, nape, upperparts, and tail are rufous-brown. Their wings are mostly rufous-brown with dark brown inner webs and paler edges on the flight feathers. Their throat and underparts are white. Their breast has grayish brown edges and their sides and flanks are more extensively grayish brown.

The other subspecies of the thrush-like antpitta differ from the nominate and each other thus:

- M. c. modesta: more olive-brown (less rufescent) upperparts than nominate with a yellowish cast to the breast
- M. c. dissors: more olive-brown (less rufescent) upperparts than nominate but less so than modesta
- M. c. minor: duller and more olive-brown (less rufescent) upperparts than nominate
- M. c. signata: more olive-brown (less rufescent) upperparts than nominate but darker and more rufous than minor

All subspecies have a dark brown iris, a black maxilla, a pinkish orange or pinkish yellow mandible with a black tip, and pale pink legs and feet.

== Distribution and habitat ==
The thrush-like antpitta is found throughout most of the Amazon Basin. The subspecies are found thus (but see below):

- M. c. modesta: restricted to the Eastern Andes in Colombia's Meta Department
- M. c. dissors: eastern Colombia, southern Venezuela's Amazonas state, and northwestern Brazil
- M. c. campanisona: eastern Venezuela's Bolívar state east through the Guianas and northern Brazil to the Atlantic, all north of the Amazon
- M. c. signata the Eastern Andes of southern Colombia and east of the Andes south through Ecuador into Peru to the Marañón River and Amazon; from them east to the Napo River while north of the Amazon
- M. c. minor: east of the Andes in Peru south of the Maranon and Amazon, south into Bolivia's Pando and La Paz departments, and east into western Brazil to the Purus River and perhaps beyond

The demarcations between the ranges of the subspecies, and especially that between dissors and signata, are not well defined.

The thrush-like antpitta inhabits humid rainforest in the lowlands and foothills, primarily terra firme. It favors areas with a dense understory such as openings caused by tree-fall, regrowing clearings, edges along roads, and especially edges along watercourses. It is found from sea level to 800 m (2,600 ft) in Brazil. In Venezuela it reaches 800 m (2,600 ft), in Colombia 600 m (2,000 ft), in Ecuador 700 m (2,300 ft), and in Peru 1,000 m (3,300 ft) and locally up to 1,500 m (4,900 ft).

== Behavior ==
=== Movement ===
The thrush-like antpitta is a year-round resident throughout its range.

=== Feeding ===
The thrush-like antpitta's diet has not been detailed but is known to include insects and other arthropods. It usually forages alone, and infrequently in pairs, hopping and walking on the forest floor and up onto fallen logs and low branches. It has a few times been observed attending army ant swarms.

=== Breeding ===
The thrush-like antpitta's breeding season varies geographically, for instance including December and January in French Guiana, March and April in Guyana, and spanning at least December to May in Ecuador. The species' nest is a shallow cup of sticks lined with rootlets and other flexible material sitting on substrates like a tangle of small branches, interlaced vines, clumps of grass, and the base of a clump of ferns. Nests are usually near the ground; the highest known was 60 cm (2 ft) above it. Both sexes build the nest. All known clutches were of two eggs and both sexes incubate the clutch. The incubation period, time to fledging, and other details of parental care are not known.

=== Vocalization ===
The thrush-like antpitta typically sings from the ground or a low perch within dense vegetation. One description of its song, from Ecuador, is "a series of 4-6 hollow whistled notes, delivered quite quickly, 'whoh-whoh-whoh-whoh-whoh-whoh' " and may be repeated for long stretches. There appears to be some variation in the song, as that in eastern Venezuela is described as "a low, rhythmically whistled wü-whoo, wü-whee-whee, 1st and 3rd notes lower in pitch; has [a] breezy, hollow, and reedy quality". The species' call is "a low rattle or churr".

== Status ==
The IUCN has assessed the thrush-like antpitta as being of Least Concern. It has an extremely large range; its population size is not known and is believed to be decreasing. "The species appears generally tolerant of secondary, disturbed and fragmented habitats. However, as large-scale loss of forests through logging and agricultural activities can cause the extirpation of the species' insect prey, deforestation represents an indirect threat to the species." It is considered "fairly common" in Colombia, "numerous and widespread" in Ecuador, "uncommon and apparently very local" in Venezuela, and "widespread and fairly common" in Peru. It occurs in many protected areas. However, it is "a forest-floor insectivore and it seems unlikely that populations will thrive for long in human-altered landscapes where other ecologically similar species are prone to expatriation".
