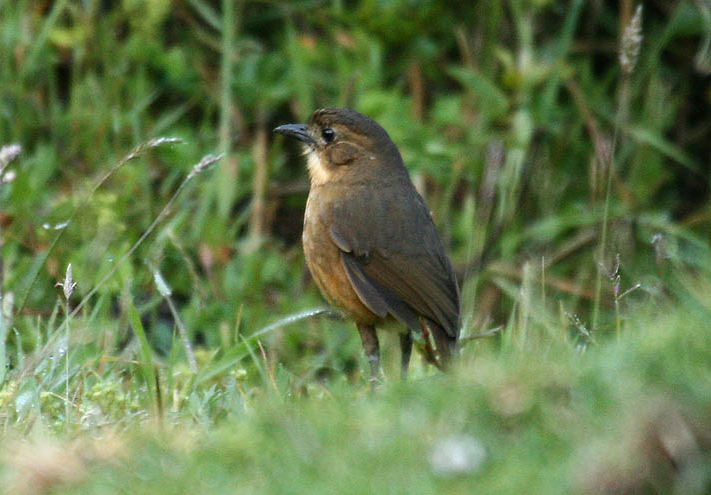

Conservation status
- Least Concern (IUCN 3.1)

Scientific classification
- Kingdom: Animalia
- Phylum: Chordata
- Class: Aves
- Order: Passeriformes
- Family: Grallariidae
- Genus: Grallaria
- Species: G. quitensis

Binomial name
- Grallaria quitensis Lesson, 1844
- Ranges of the tawny antpitta (central portion), Boyaca antpitta (north), and Atuen antpitta (south). (See the Taxonomy and Distribution sections.)

= Tawny antpitta =

Species of bird

The tawny antpitta, or western tawny antpitta, (Grallaria quitensis) is a species of bird in the family Grallariidae. It is found in Colombia, Ecuador, and Peru.

== Taxonomy and systematics ==
The tawny antpitta was long treated as having three subspecies. A 2003 publication suggested that each might be a full species. In 2016 BirdLife International's Handbook of the Birds of the World (HBW) recognized them as separate species, the western, northern, and southern tawny antpittas. The International Ornithological Committee (IOC) recognized them in July 2023. The IOC retained the name tawny antpitta for Grallaria quitensis and named the other two the Boyaca antpitta (G. alticola) and the Atuen antpitta (G. atuensis). The Clements taxonomy recognized the new species with those names in October 2023 and HBW adopted the IOC names in December 2023. However, as of July 2024 the South American Classification Committee of the American Ornithological Society had not recognized the split, though it did acknowledge the 2003 publication's suggestion.

== Description ==
The tawny antpitta is 16 to 18 cm (6.3 to 7.1 in) long and weighs between 58 and 81 g (2.0 and 2.9 oz). The sexes have the same plumage. Adults have pale buff lores and are whitish around the eye on an otherwise olive brown to rufous olive face. They have mostly pale brown to olive brown crown, nape, back, wings, and tail. Their crown and back have a slight gray wash and their rump is browner, almost clay-colored. Their primaries have pale buff leading edges and blackish to blackish olive trailing vanes. Their chin and throat are whitish. The rest of their underparts are mostly tawny brown with indistinct white mottling. The center of their belly is whitish, their flanks paler than their breast, and their undertail coverts a richer rufescent tawny. They have a chestnut brown iris, a black to blackish gray bill sometimes with a brownish base to the mandible, and dark brownish to blackish legs and feet.

== Distribution and habitat ==
The tawny antpitta is found along the spine of the Andes from Caldas Department in west-central Colombia south through Ecuador and slightly into northern Peru north and west of the Marañón River. It inhabits the páramo and the semi-open edges of elfin forest and Polylepis forest. Lakeshores and swampy areas appear to be favored. In elevation it ranges between 2,200 and 4,000 m (7,200 and 13,100 ft) in Colombia, mostly between 3,000 and 4,500 m (9,800 and 14,800 ft) in Ecuador, and between 2,850 and 3,400 m (9,400 and 11,200 ft) in Peru.

== Behavior ==
=== Movement ===
The tawny antpitta is believed to be a year-round resident throughout its range.

=== Feeding ===
The tawny antpitta's diet is not well documented but it is known to include a variety of insects, other invertebrates, and small vertebrates. It usually forages by itself, on the ground, hopping and pausing to flick aside leave litter, to probe mosses and the ground, and to glean from vegetation.

=== Breeding ===
The tawny antpitta apparently breeds at any time of the year. Its nest is a deep open cup made of moss and sticks and lined with grass placed on bunch grass or another low plant. Both sexes are believed to build the nest. All of the known clutches were of two eggs; they are sky blue to blue-green with variable amounts of darker flecking. The only recorded incubation period was 21.5 days and that clutch apparently fledged 15 to 16 days after hatch. Both parents incubated the clutch; other details of parental care are not known.

=== Vocalization ===
Despite its generally open habitat, the tawny antpitta is more often heard than seen. Its basic song is "a simple, three-note vocalization that starts with a short, even, overslurred note followed by a pause, and then two slightly longer overslurred notes at a slightly lower pitch in quick succession" that lasts about 1.1 to 1.3 seconds. There is some geographic variation that is not well documented. The species' call is "a loud, explosive, strongly downslurred note that falls from ca. 4.0 to 1.3 kHz, and lasts around 0.3‒0.4 s". The species is heard most often around dawn but vocalizes at any time of day. It vocalizes from the ground or a prominent perch.

== Status ==
The IUCN has assessed the tawny antpitta as being of Least Concern. It has a large range; its population size is not known and is believed to be stable. No immediate threats have been identified. It is considered common in Colombia and "numerous" in Ecuador. "The Tawny Antpitta appears to be relatively tolerant of disturbance and can be abundant in shrubby second growth around habitations and in agricultural areas...Nevertheless, the páramo habitat of the Tawny Antpitta is under increasing threat, especially from agricultural development and the harvesting of Polylepis trees."
