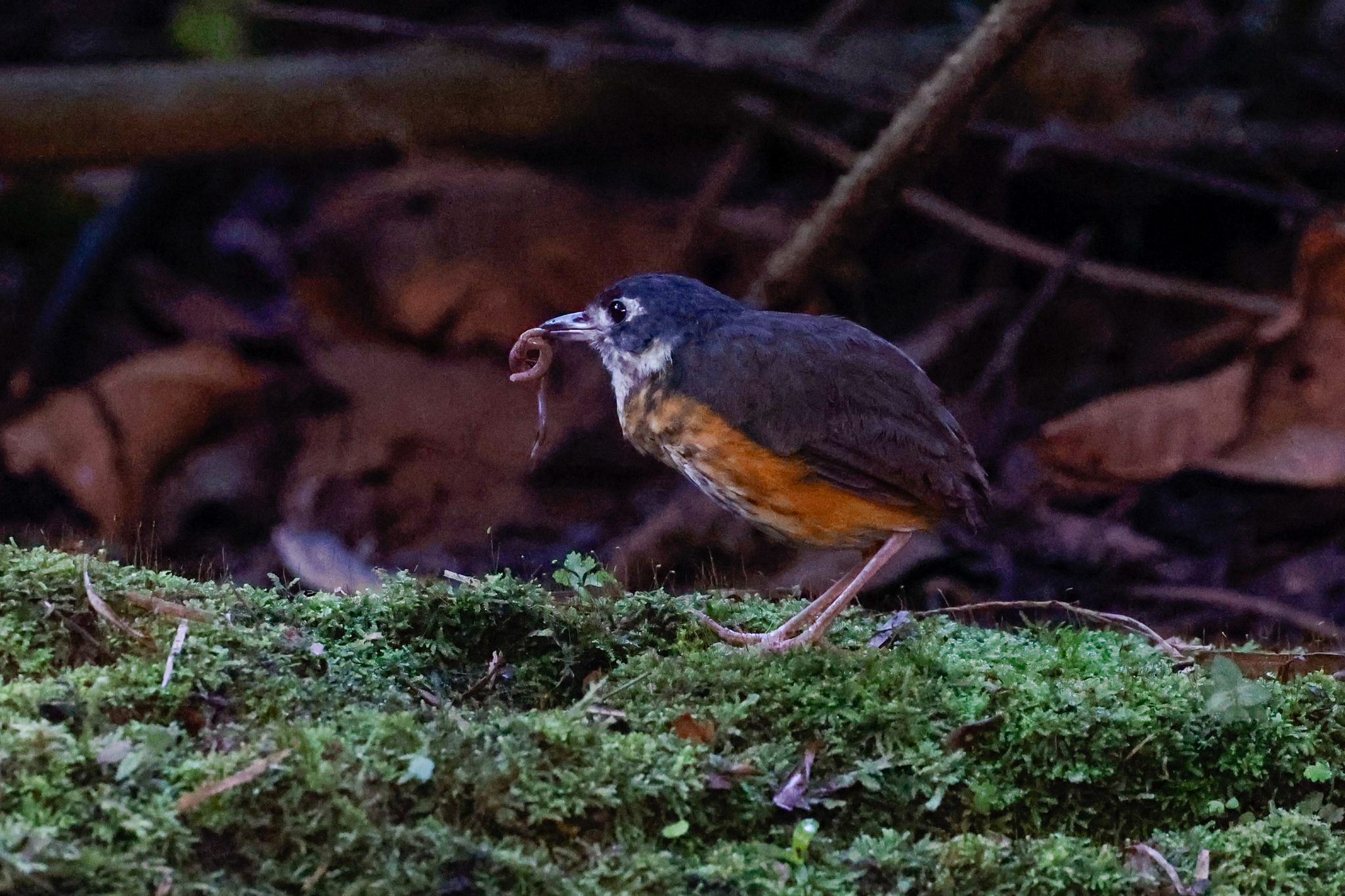

Conservation status
- Least Concern (IUCN 3.1)

Scientific classification
- Kingdom: Animalia
- Phylum: Chordata
- Class: Aves
- Order: Passeriformes
- Family: Grallariidae
- Genus: Myrmothera
- Species: M. fulviventris

Binomial name
- Myrmothera fulviventris (Sclater, PL, 1858)

Synonyms
- Grallaria fulviventris; Hylopezus fulviventris

= White-lored antpitta =

Species of bird

The white-lored antpitta or fulvous-bellied antpitta (Myrmothera fulviventris) is a species of bird in the family Grallariidae. It is found in Colombia, Ecuador, and Peru.

== Taxonomy and systematics ==
The white-lored antpitta was originally described in 1858 as Grallaria fulviventris. It was later transferred to genus Hylopezus and still later to Myrmothera.

The white-lored antpitta has two subspecies, the nominate M. f. fulviventris (Sclater, PL, 1858) and M. f. caquetae (Chapman, 1923). What is now the thicket antpitta (M. dives) was previously a third subspecies of it, with the combined species called the "fulvous-bellied antpitta".

== Description ==
The white-lored antpitta is 14 to 15 cm (5.5 to 5.9 in) long; three individuals weighed between 44 and 55 g (1.6 and 1.9 oz). The subspecies have the same plumage as do the sexes. Adults have a white loral patch and a white triangle behind their eye. Their crown, nape, and ear coverts are dark slaty gray. Their upperparts, wings, and tail are dark olive-brown. Their throat is white with a black line from the bill through it. Their breast and sides are buffy ochraceous with dusky streaks, their belly white, and their flanks and crissum orange-rufous. They have a dark brown iris, a blackish bill with a pale base to the mandible, and pinkish legs and feet.

== Distribution and habitat ==
The white-lored antpitta is a bird of the far western Amazon Basin. The nominate subspecies is found in eastern Ecuador and northern Peru north of the Amazon and Marañón rivers. Subspecies M. f. caquetae is found adjoining the nominate's range in the southern Colombian departments of Putumayo and Caquetá. The species inhabits the edges of terra firme and várzea forest, riparian forest, and overgrown openings in the forest interior. It is almost exclusively found under and within very dense undergrowth. In elevation it occurs up to 400 m (1,300 ft) in Colombia and to 750 m (2,500 ft) in Ecuador.

== Behavior ==
=== Movement ===
The white-lored antpitta is believed to be a year-round resident throughout its range.

=== Feeding ===
The white-lored antpitta's diet has not been reported. It is usually seen singly as it forages while hopping and walking on the forest floor and downed logs.

=== Breeding ===
Nothing is known about the white-lored antpitta's breeding biology.

=== Vocalization ===
The male white-lored antpitta's song is "a short slow series of 3-4 abrupt and hollow notes, e.g. 'kwoh-kwoh-kwoh-kwoh' ". It also "gives a faster and accelerating series of shorter notes, 'kow-kow-kow-kow-ko-ko-ko-ko-ko-ko-ko' ". The white-lored antpitta sings throughout the day, usually from a perch within 2 m (7 ft) of the ground.

== Status ==
The IUCN has assessed the white-lored antpitta as being of Least Concern. Its population size is not known and is believed to be stable. No immediate threats have been identified. It is considered "uncommon and seemingly local" in Colombia, "uncommon" in Ecuador, and "uncommon and local" in Peru. It is known from at least three protected areas.
