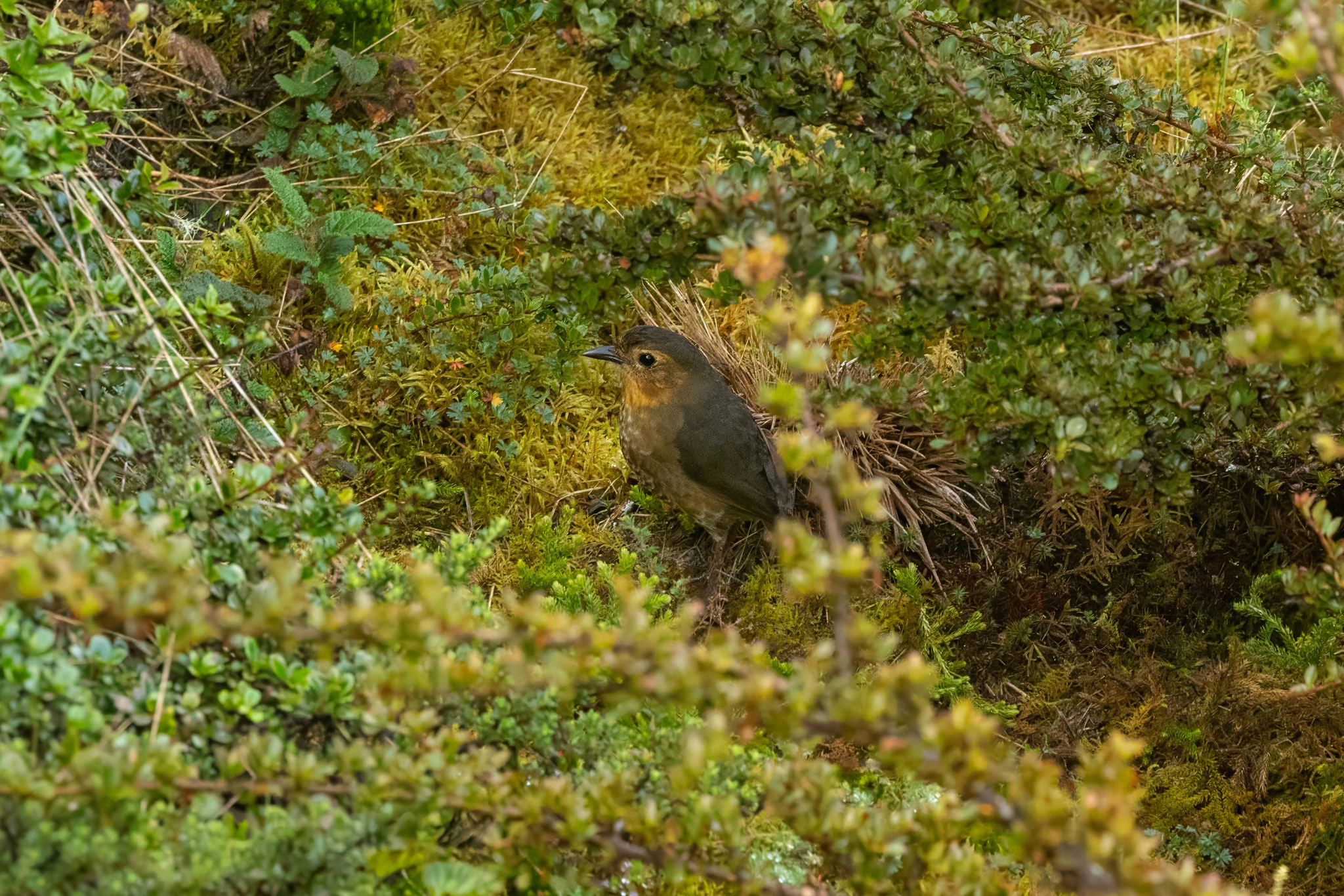

Conservation status
- Least Concern (IUCN 3.1)

Scientific classification
- Kingdom: Animalia
- Phylum: Chordata
- Class: Aves
- Order: Passeriformes
- Family: Grallariidae
- Genus: Grallaria
- Species: G. atuensis

Binomial name
- Grallaria atuensis Carriker, 1933
- Range in Peru

= Atuen antpitta =

Species of bird

The Atuen antpitta, or southern tawny antpitta, (Grallaria atuensis) is a species of bird in the family Grallariidae. It is endemic to Peru.

== Taxonomy and systematics ==
The Atuen antpitta was formerly considered to be a subspecies of the tawny antpitta (Grallaria quitensis). A 2003 publication suggested that it might be a full species. In 2016 BirdLife International's Handbook of the Birds of the World (HBW) recognized it as a separate species, the southern tawny antpitta. The International Ornithological Committee (IOC) recognized it in July 2023 with the name Atuen antpitta. The Clements taxonomy recognized the new species with that name in October 2023 and HBW adopted the IOC name in December 2023. However, as of July 2024 the South American Classification Committee of the American Ornithological Society had not recognized the split, though it did acknowledge the 2003 publication's suggestion.

== Description ==
The Atuen antpitta is about 18 cm (7.1 in) long and apparently weighs between 58 and 65 g (2.0 and 2.3 oz). The sexes have the same plumage. Adults have deep cinnamon-rufous lores, eyering, and spot behind the eye. Their ear coverts are deep cinnamon-rufous with black tips that make them look sooty. They have mostly brown to dusky olive-brown crown, nape, back, wings, and tail. Their throat is cinnamon-ochraceous. Their underparts are mostly dark olive-ochraceous that is darkest on the breast. Their breast and belly feathers have small white tips that give a scaled appearance. Their flanks are buffy olive-brown. They have a chestnut brown iris, a black to blackish gray bill, and brownish gray legs and feet.

== Distribution and habitat ==
The Atuen antpitta is found on the spine of Peru's Andes in southern Amazonas, eastern La Libertad, and San Martín departments. It primarily inhabits the páramo and nearby montane forest. In elevation it mostly occurs between 2,850 and 3,500 m (9,400 and 11,500 ft).

== Behavior ==
=== Movement ===
The Atuen antpitta is believed to be a year-round resident throughout its range.

=== Feeding ===
The Atuen antpitta's diet is not well documented but it is assumed to feed on a variety of insects and other invertebrates. It usually forages by itself, on the ground, hopping and pausing to flick aside leave litter, to probe mosses and the ground, and to glean from vegetation.

=== Breeding ===
The Atuen antpitta's breeding season apparently includes September. Nothing else is known about the species' breeding biology. Its nest, eggs, and breeding behavior are assumed to be similar to those of its former parent tawny antpitta, which see here.

=== Vocalization ===
Despite its generally open habitat, the Atuen antpitta is more often heard than seen. Its vocalization was the principal reason it was recognized as a species. Its song is a hollow whistle, "WHEEP tu-TUEE?". Its call is "a harsh, rolling screech: TCHEE'ew". The species is heard most often around dawn but vocalizes at any time of day. It vocalizes from the ground or a prominent perch.

== Status ==
The IUCN has assessed the Atuen antpitta as being of Least Concern. It has a small range; its population size is not known and is believed to be stable. No immediate threats have been identified. It is considered fairly common. It occurs in at least two protected areas. "Nevertheless, Atuen Antpitta's páramo habitat is increasingly threatened, and populations are undoubtedly facing ongoing and ever-increasing pressure from habitat fragmentation and destruction."
