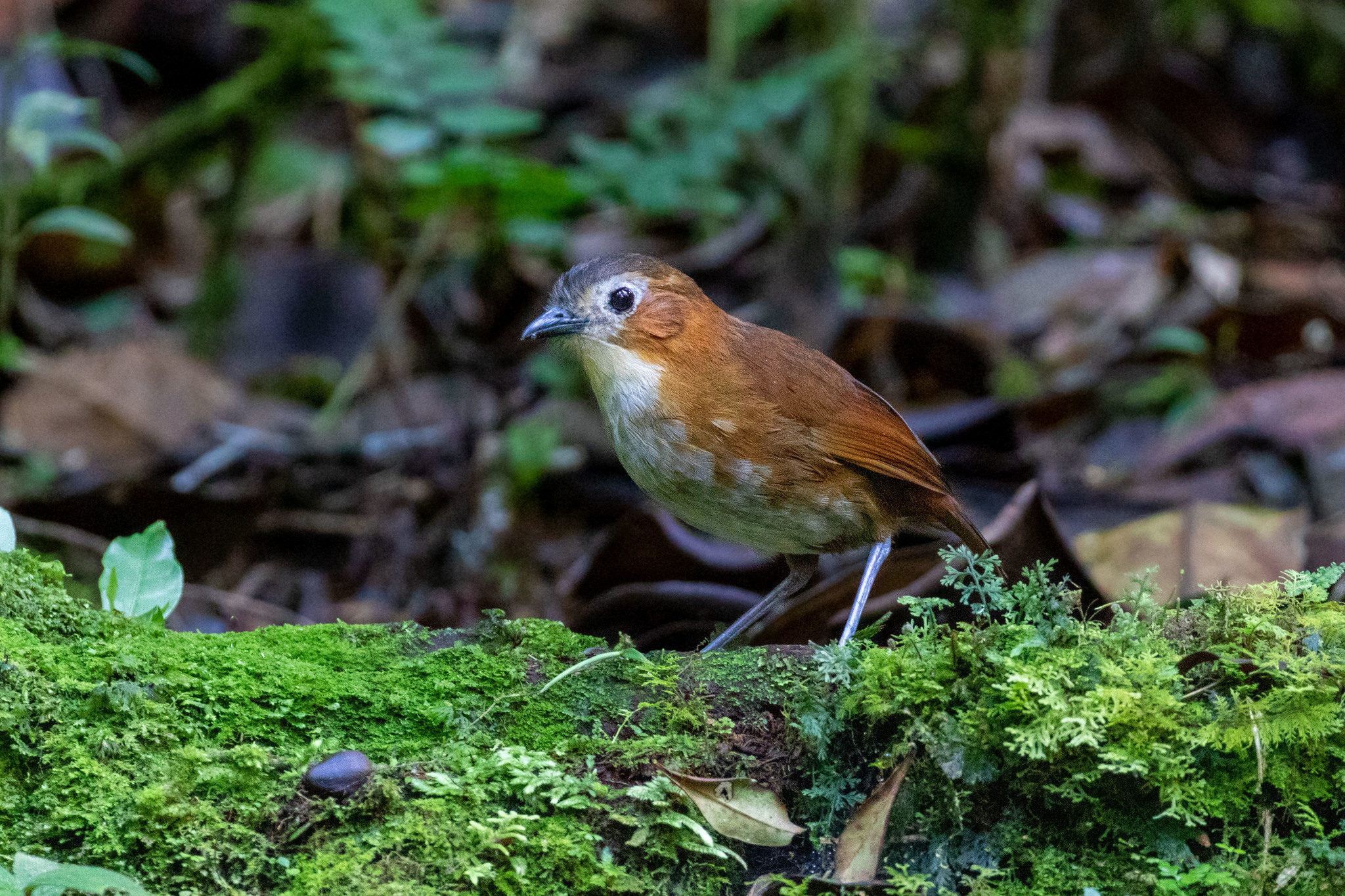

Conservation status
- Least Concern (IUCN 3.1)

Scientific classification
- Kingdom: Animalia
- Phylum: Chordata
- Class: Aves
- Order: Passeriformes
- Family: Grallariidae
- Genus: Grallaria
- Species: G. przewalskii

Binomial name
- Grallaria przewalskii Taczanowski, 1882

= Rusty-tinged antpitta =

Species of bird

The rusty-tinged antpitta (Grallaria przewalskii) is a species of bird in the family Grallariidae. It is endemic to Peru.

== Taxonomy and systematics ==
The rusty-tinged antpitta was described in 1882 as a species. In 1970 at least one author treated it as a subspecies of the white-bellied antpitta (G. hypoleuca) but by the late twentieth century it was restored to species status. It is monotypic.

== Description ==
Grallaria antpittas are a "wonderful group of plump and round antbirds whose feathers are often fluffed up...they have stout bills [and] very short tails". The rusty-tinged antpitta is 16 to 22 cm (6.3 to 8.7 in) long and weighs 60 to 74 g (2.1 to 2.6 oz). The sexes have the same plumage. Adults have a pale gray forecrown that darkens on the rest of their crown. They have a faint whitish ring around their eye and are rufous below the eye. They have a rufous chestnut upper back and a dark rufous brown lower nape, lower back, rump, wings, and tail. Their chin is white, their throat and breast rufous, their belly white, and their flanks and crissum dusky rufous. Both sexes have a dark brown or brown iris, a black bill, and blue-gray legs and feet.

== Distribution and habitat ==
The rusty-tinged antpitta is found on the east side of the Peruvian Andes from south of the Marañón River in Amazonas Department south into San Martín and La Libertad departments. Its habitat requirements have not been fully defined but it appears to inhabit the floor and understory of humid primary forest, especially areas with stands of Chusquea bamboo. In elevation it ranges between 1,700 and 2,750 m (5,600 and 9,000 ft).

== Behavior ==
=== Movement ===
The rusty-tinged antpitta is resident throughout its range.

=== Feeding ===
The rusty-tinged antpitta's diet and foraging behavior have not been detailed but it is known to feed on insects and seeds. It is assumed to forage on or near the ground like other antpittas.

=== Breeding ===
Nothing is known about the rusty-tinged antpitta's breeding biology.

=== Vocalization ===
The rusty-tinged antpitta sings "a 3-note song with the middle note lowest and the final note highest and loudest: hip hew-HEE". Its call is "a series of rising, plaintive, hollow clew? notes".

== Status ==
The IUCN originally in 2004 assessed the rusty-tinged antpitta as being of Least Concern, then in 2012 as Vulnerable, and then in 2022 again as of Least Concern. It has a restricted range; its population size is not known and is believed to be stable. No immediate threats have been identified. It is considered fairly common. "Apart from the ubiquitous assumption that this species will be detrimentally affected by habitat fragmentation, there are no specifically documented human threats to Rusty-tinged Antpitta."
