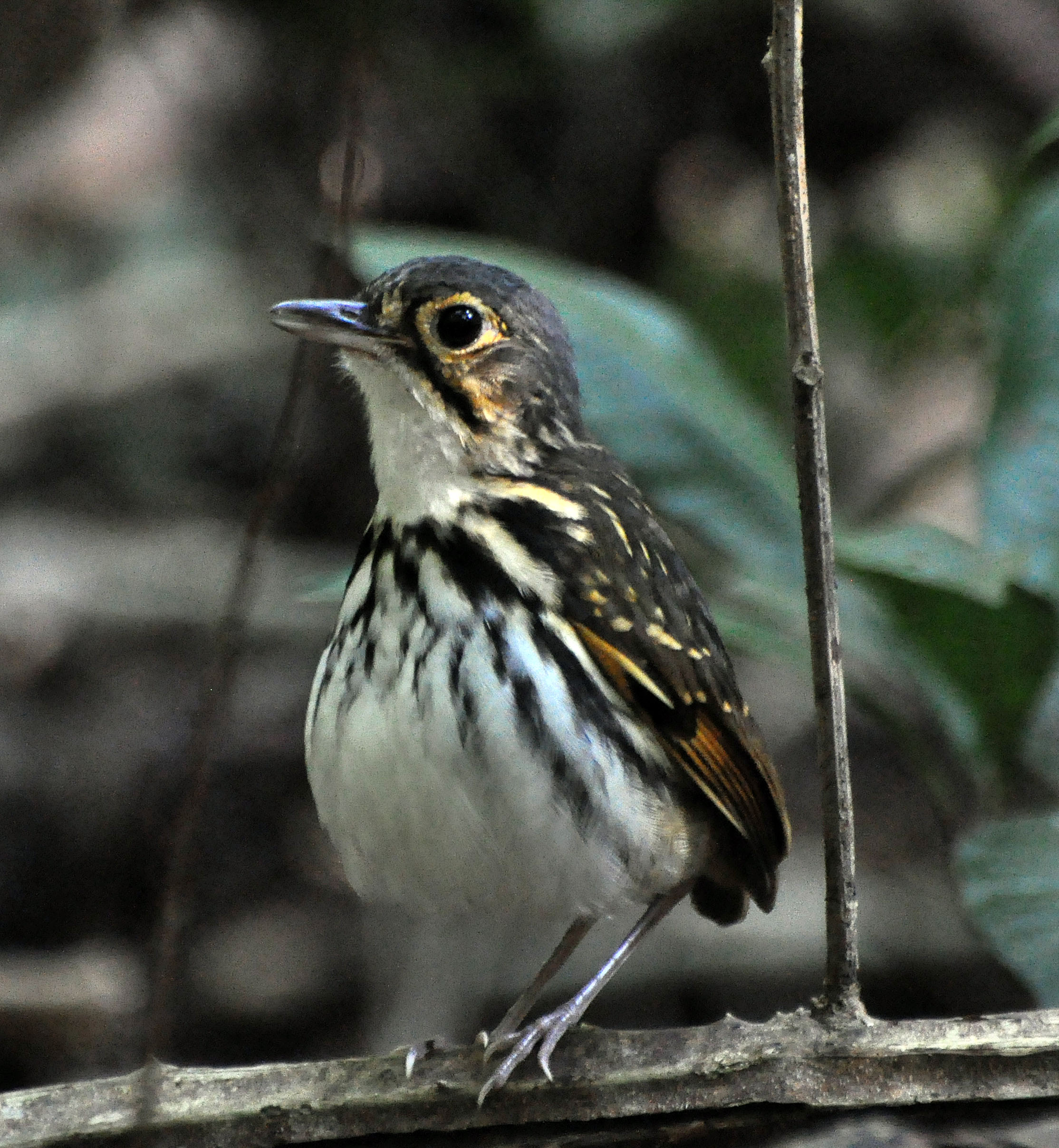

Conservation status
- Least Concern (IUCN 3.1)

Scientific classification
- Kingdom: Animalia
- Phylum: Chordata
- Class: Aves
- Order: Passeriformes
- Family: Grallariidae
- Genus: Hylopezus
- Species: H. perspicillatus

Binomial name
- Hylopezus perspicillatus (Lawrence, 1861)

= Streak-chested antpitta =

Species of bird

The streak-chested antpitta or spectacled antpitta (Hylopezus perspicillatus) is a species of bird in the family Grallariidae. It is found in Colombia, Costa Rica, Ecuador, Honduras, Nicaragua, and Panama.

== Taxonomy and systematics ==
The streak-chested antpitta was originally described in 1861 as Grallaria perspicillata. It and several other Grallaria species were moved to genus Hylopezus as a result of a study published in 1969. It bore the English name "spectacled antpitta" until late in the twentieth century.

The streak-chested antpitta has these five subspecies:

- H. p. intermedius (Ridgway, 1884)
- H. p. lizanoi (Cherrie, 1891)
- H. p. perspicillatus (Lawrence, 1861)
- H. p. periophthalmicus (Salvadori & Festa, 1898)
- H. p. pallidior Todd, 1919

== Description ==
The streak-chested antpitta is 12.5 to 14 cm (4.9 to 5.5 in) long and weighs 40 to 54 g (1.4 to 1.9 oz). The sexes have the same plumage. Adults of the nominate subspecies H. p. perspicillatus have a yellow loral patch and a wide yellow ring around their eye. Their ear coverts are yellow with a black line below them. Their crown and nape are gray, Their upperparts are brown with gray bases to the feathers and some yellowish streaks on the upper back. Their tail is brown. Their flight feathers are brown to blackish with yellow bases and an orangish to yellow band on their underside. Their wing coverts are brown with yellow tips on the median and lesser coverts. Their throat is buffy to white. Their underparts are white to buffy with black streaks across their breast and along their sides and flanks.

The other subspecies of the streak-chested antpitta differ from the nominate and each other thus:

- H. p. intermedius: unstreaked buffy or tawny buff flanks and undertail coverts
- H. p. lizanoi: little or no streaking on the back
- H. p. periophthalmicus: deeper ochraceous loral spot and eyering than nominate, olive blackish crown, and slightly more brownish olive back
- H. p. pallidior: overall paler than nominate with duller gray crown

All subspecies have a dark brown iris, a slate gray maxilla, a pale gray to pink mandible, and pale gray legs and feet.

== Distribution and habitat ==
The subspecies of the streak-chested antpitta are found thus:

- H. p. intermedius: Caribbean slope from eastern Honduras south through Nicaragua and Costa Rica into Panama as far as Bocas del Toro Province
- H. p. lizanoi: Pacific slope of southern Costa Rica and formerly into western Panama's Chiriquí Province
- H. p. perspicillatus: from Veraguas Province in western Panama east into Colombia's Chocó Department
- H. p. periophthalmicus: Pacific slope from Chocó Department south into northwestern Ecuador's Esmeraldas Province
- H. p. pallidior: Colombia in the valleys of the upper Sinú, lower Cauca, and middle Magdalena rivers

The streak-chested antpitta inhabits lowland evergreen forest in the tropical and lower subtropical zones. In elevation it reaches a maximum of 1,250 m (4,100 ft), but up to 200 m (660 ft) in Honduras, 1,200 m (3,900 ft) in Costa Rica and Colombia, and 800 m (2,600 ft) in Ecuador.

== Behavior ==
=== Movement ===
The streak-chested antpitta is a year-round resident throughout its range.

=== Feeding ===
The streak-chested antpitta feeds primarily on terrestrial arthropods; small lizards and frogs are a minor component of its diet. It is mostly terrestrial, though it occasionally feeds as high as 4 m (13 ft) above the ground. It hops (and occasionally runs) across the forest floor, stopping to toss aside leaf litter.

=== Breeding ===
The streak-chested antpitta builds a shallow nest of twigs and decaying leaves lined with rootlets and other thin material. They are typically placed on a horizontal branch or palm frond and sometimes within vine tangles, and usually within about 1 m (3 ft) of the ground. The usual clutch is two eggs; their color varies widely across the species' range. Where the times are known, the incubation period is about 22 days and fledging occurs about 12 days after hatch. Both sexes incubate the clutch, but other details of parental care are not known.

=== Vocalization ===
The streak-chested antpitta's song is " a series of 7–9 whistled notes, second loudest, first lowest...gradually falling slightly in pitch and volume". It has been written as "poh, po-po-po-po-po-po-peu-peu-peu". The species' alarm call is a "whistled keeuw, immediately followed by decelerating rattle". It typically sings from a low perch but also while on the ground.

== Status ==
The IUCN has assessed the streak-chested antpitta as being of Least Concern. It has a very large range; its estimated population of at least 50,000 mature individuals is believed to be decreasing. No immediate threats have been identified. It is considered uncommon in Honduras, fairly common on Costa Rica's Pacific side and uncommon on the Caribbean side, uncommon in Colombia, and scarce in Ecuador. "Similar to other understory insectivorous species, this species appears to be vulnerable to forest fragmentation."
