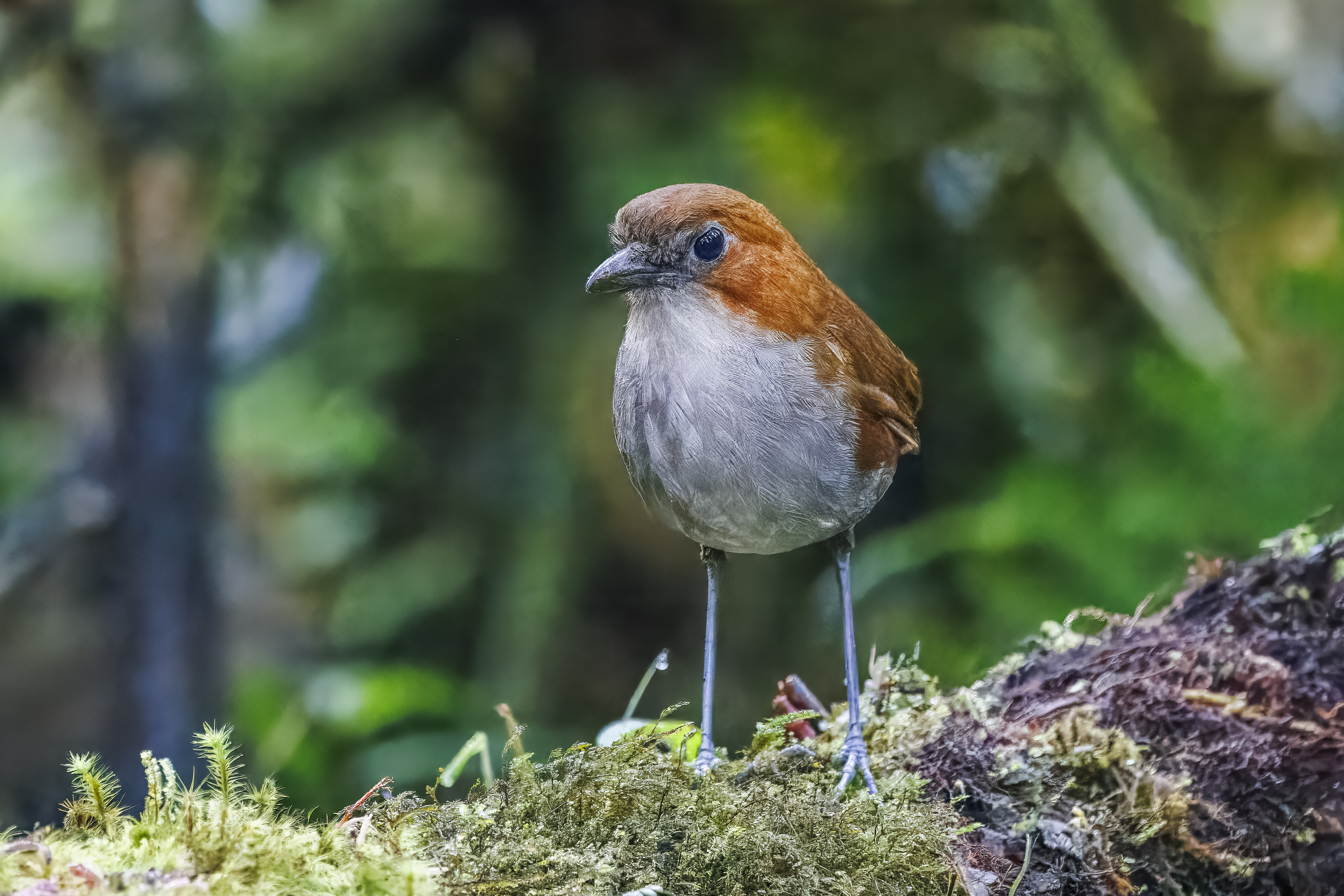
- G. h. castanea, Ecuador

Conservation status
- Least Concern (IUCN 3.1)

Scientific classification
- Kingdom: Animalia
- Phylum: Chordata
- Class: Aves
- Order: Passeriformes
- Family: Grallariidae
- Genus: Grallaria
- Species: G. hypoleuca

Binomial name
- Grallaria hypoleuca Sclater, PL, 1855

= White-bellied antpitta =

Species of bird

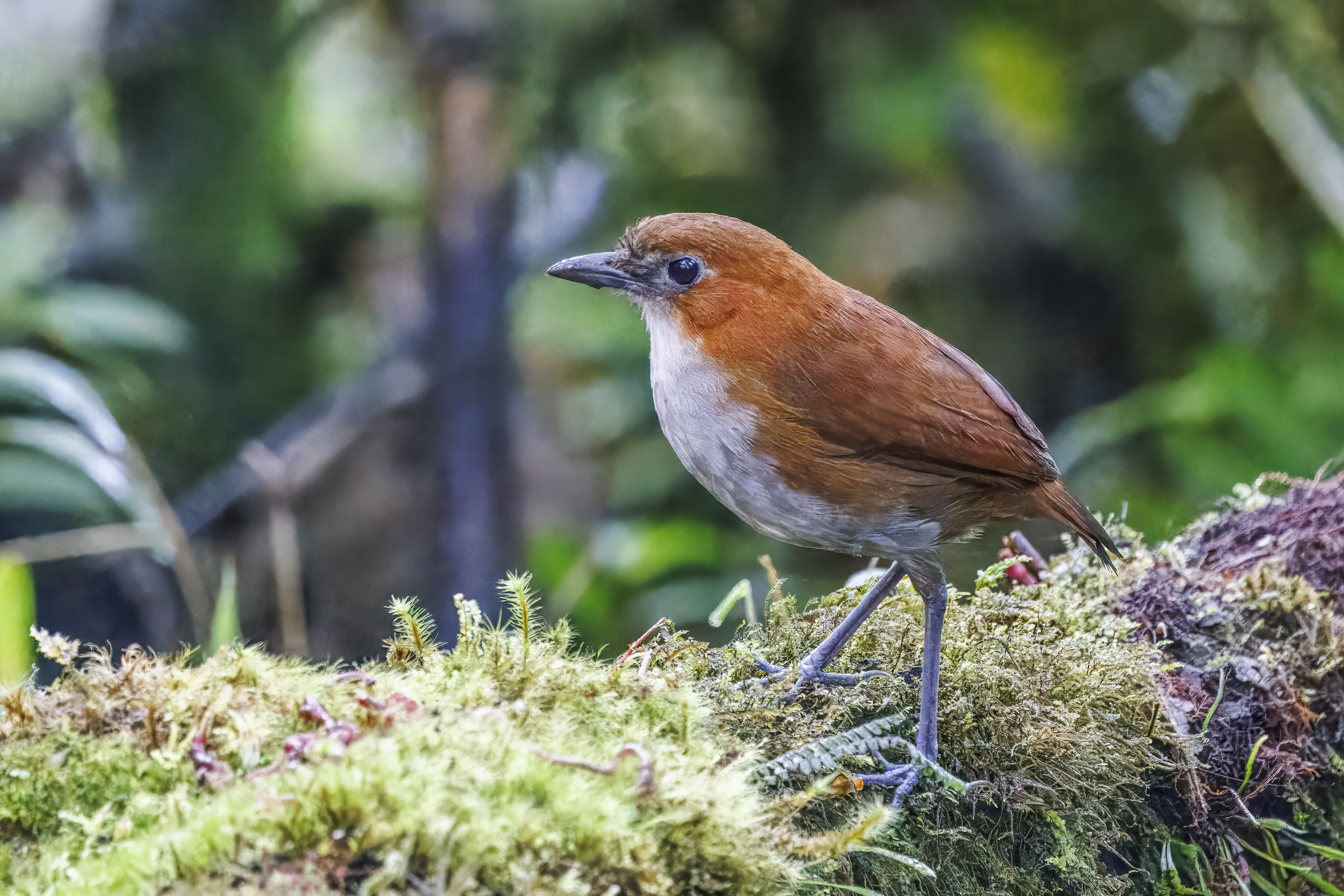

The white-bellied antpitta (Grallaria hypoleuca) is a species of bird in the family Grallariidae. It is found in Colombia, Ecuador and Peru.

== Taxonomy and systematics ==
The white-bellied antpitta has a complicated taxonomic history. It was originally described as a species with no subspecies. Subspecies G. h. castanea was added in 1923. The yellow-breasted antpitta was also described as a species but in the mid-twentieth century was included as a subspecies of the white-bellied. Later still what are now the rusty-tinged antpitta (G. przewalskii), bay antpitta (G. capitalis) and red-and-white antpitta (G. erythroleuca) were all merged into the white-bellied. By the end of the twentieth century all of them except G. h. castanea were restored to full species status. The five are considered a superspecies.

== Description ==
Grallaria antpittas are a "wonderful group of plump and round antbirds whose feathers are often fluffed up...they have stout bills [and] very short tails". The white-bellied antpitta is 16 to 18 cm (6.3 to 7.1 in) long; three males weighed 62 to 69 g (2.2 to 2.4 oz). The sexes have the same plumage. Adults of the nominate subspecies G. h. hypoleuca have a rufescent brown or dusky brown crown with some black streaks on the forecrown. They have white or gray lores on a rufous face. Their back, rump, wings, and tail are reddish brown. Their throat is white. Their breast is mostly gray with rufous brown sides, their belly white, their flanks olive brown or tawny brown, and their undertail coverts tawny. Subspecies G. h. castanea is smaller than the nominate. Its upperparts are much deeper in color and that color extends further onto its sides and flanks. Both sexes of both subspecies have a brown iris, a black or blackish gray bill, and blue-gray legs and feet.

== Distribution and habitat ==
The white-bellied antpitta has a disjunct distribution. The nominate subspecies is found in Colombia on both slopes of the Central Andes in Antioquia Department and on both slopes of the Eastern Andes between Santander and Cundinamarca departments. Subspecies G. h. castanea is found from the upper Magdalena River Valley in Colombia south on the eastern Andean slope through eastern Ecuador into the Department of Cajamarca in northern Peru. The species primarily inhabits humid montane forest edges and mature secondary forest. It also occurs in the forest interior where dense vegetation grows in openings caused by treefall or landslides. In elevation it ranges between 1,400 and 2,700 m (4,600 and 8,900 ft) in Colombia, between 1,400 and 2,200 m (4,600 and 7,200 ft) in Ecuador, and between 1,700 and 2,100 m (5,600 and 6,900 ft) in Peru.

== Behavior ==
=== Movement ===
The white-bellied antpitta is resident throughout its range.

=== Feeding ===
The white-bellied antpitta's diet has not been detailed but is known to include insects. They are almost entirely terrestrial, where they run and hop along the ground, usually in dense vegetation. They have been observed following army ant swarms and following humans in the forest to capture prey disturbed by the ants or people.

=== Breeding ===
The white-bellied antpitta's breeding season spans at least March to September. The one fully described nest was a cup of twigs and rootlets built in the fork of a tree about 1.25 m (4 ft) above the ground. It held two light greenish eggs which both adults incubated. The incubation period, time to fledging, and other details of parental care are not known.

=== Vocalization ===
The white-bellied antpitta's "simple and far-carrying song [is] a fast too, téw-téw, given at rather long intervals (often 10 or more seconds)". Its call is "a strikingly pygmy-owl [Glaucidium]-like vocalization, too, too, too, too ...". The species typically sings from a perch within about 2 m (7 ft) of the ground.

== Status ==
The IUCN has assessed the white-bellied antpitta as being of Least Concern. It has a large range; its population size is not known and is believed to be stable. No immediate threats have been identified. It is considered local in Colombia, uncommon to fairly common in Ecuador, and fairly common in Peru. "Human activity has little short-term direct effect on White-bellied Antpitta, other than the local effects of habitat destruction. Given that this species occupies regenerating habitats, it may even benefit, locally, from human activities, such as a low level of clearing for subsistence agriculture."
