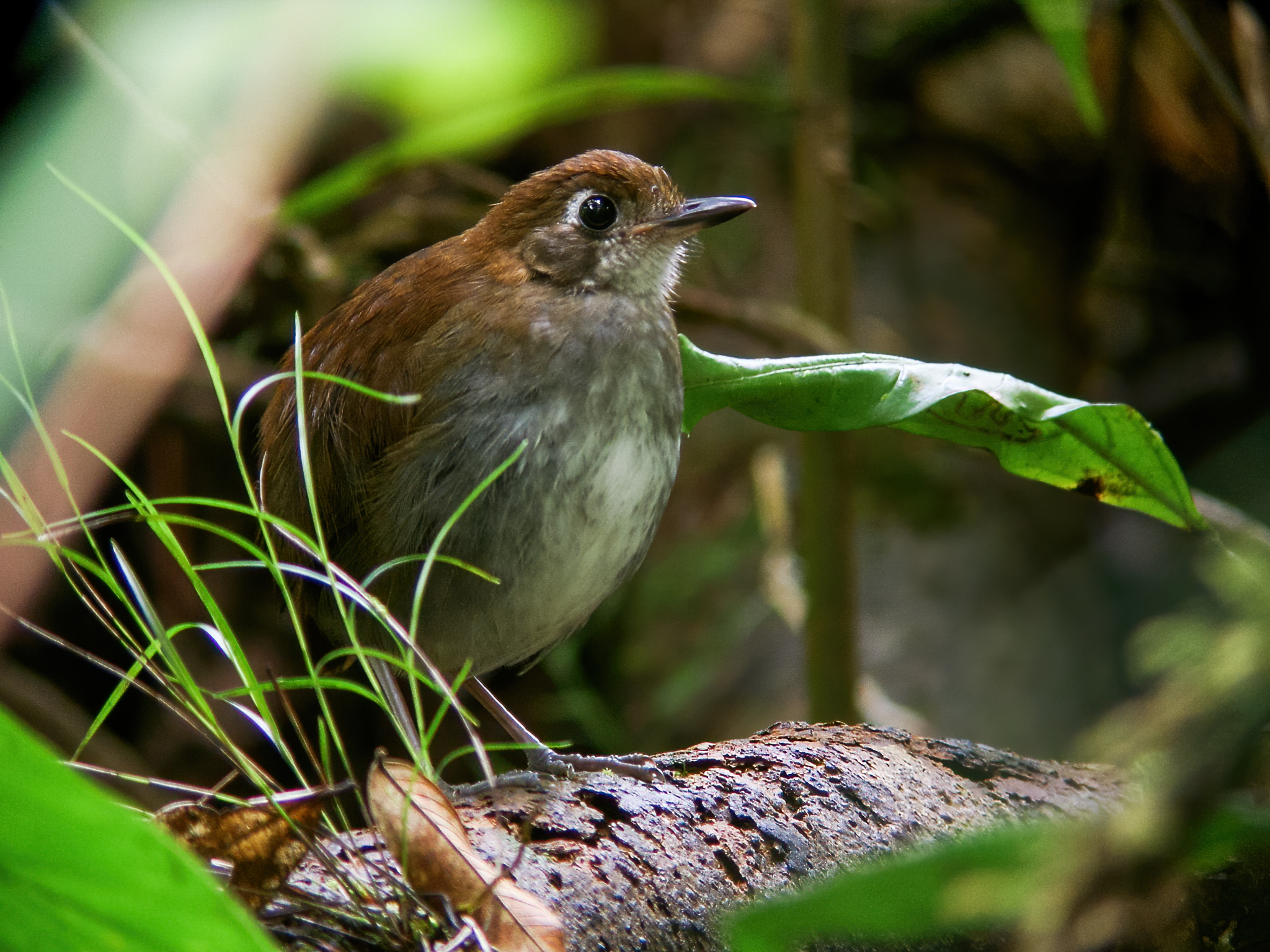

Conservation status
- Least Concern (IUCN 3.1)

Scientific classification
- Kingdom: Animalia
- Phylum: Chordata
- Class: Aves
- Order: Passeriformes
- Family: Grallariidae
- Genus: Myrmothera
- Species: M. simplex

Binomial name
- Myrmothera simplex (Salvin & Godman, 1884)

= Tepui antpitta =

Species of bird

The tepui antpitta or brown-breasted antpitta (Myrmothera simplex) is a species of bird in the family Grallariidae. It is found in Brazil, Guyana, and Venezuela.

== Taxonomy and systematics ==
The tepui antpitta was originally described in 1884 as Grallaria simplex. It was later transferred to genus Myrmothera. At least one twentieth century author used the name "brown-breasted antpitta" for the species.

The tepui antpitta has these four subspecies:

- M. s. pacaraimae Phelps, WH Jr & Dickerman, 1980
- M. s. simplex (Salvin & Godman, 1884)
- M. s. guaiquinimae Zimmer, JT & Phelps, WH, 1946
- M. s. duidae Chapman, 1929

== Description ==
The tepui antpitta is about 16 cm (6.3 in) long; four males weighed between 40.5 and 53 g (1.4 and 1.9 oz) and two females 51.8 and 53 g (1.8 and 1.9 oz). The sexes have the same plumage and the subspecies differ little from each other. Adults of the nominate subspecies M. s. simplex have a small white spot behind their eye. Most of the rest of their face is chestnut-brown with slightly paler and grayer lores. Their crown, nape, upperparts, wings, and tail are chestnut-brown. Their chin and throat are white. Their breast, sides, and flanks are olivaceous gray or gray with an olive-brown wash. The center of their belly is white and their crissum tawny-brown. Subspecies M. s. duidae has a browner breast and flanks than the nominate. M. s. guaiquinimae has a more olive breast and flanks than the nominate. M. s. pacaraimae is paler than the other three subspecies and the white of its underparts starts on its lower breast. All subspecies have a brown iris, a black bill with a pink-white base to the mandible, and medium gray legs and feet.

== Distribution and habitat ==
The tepui antpitta has a disjunct distribution in the tepui region where southeastern and southern Venezuela, far northwestern Brazil, and far western Guyana meet. The subspecies are found thus:

- M. s. pacaraimae: southeastern Amazonas and southern Bolívar states in Venezuela and in adjacent northwestern Brazil
- M. s. simplex Mount Roraima and the Gran Sabana in southeastern Bolívar state and adjacent Guyana
- M. s. guaiquinimae: several tepuis in northwestern and central Bolívar state
- M. s. duidae: several tepuis in Amazonas state

The tepui antpitta inhabits dense pre-montane rainforest and cloudforest on the slopes of tepuis, and on their summits more open stunted forest. In elevation it ranges between 600 and 2,400 m (2,000 and 7,900 ft) but is mostly found above 1,200 m (3,900 ft).

== Behavior ==
=== Movement ===
The tepui antpitta is a year-round resident throughout its range.

=== Feeding ===
The tepui antpitta's diet and most aspects of its foraging behavior are unknown. It is almost entirely terrestrial, mostly foraging alone while hopping and running on the forest floor in dense mossy vegetation.

=== Breeding ===
The one known nest of the tepui antpitta was a cup of small sticks lined with smaller sticks and rootlets and placed in a Philodendron linnaei. It held two eggs that both adults were incubating. The incubation period, time to fledging, and other details of parental care are not known.

=== Vocalization ===
The tepui antpitta's song is "6-7 (occasionally more) low-pitched, deliberately paced, hollow notes, whu-whu-whu-WU-hu-hu, 1st ones rising slightly in pitch and increasing in volume, last 2-3 on same pitch". It also "gives a low, hollow, rattle-trill".

== Status ==
The IUCN has assessed the tepui antpitta as being of Least Concern. Its population size is not known and is believed to be stable. No immediate threats have been identified. It is considered uncommon to fairly common and occurs in several protected areas.
