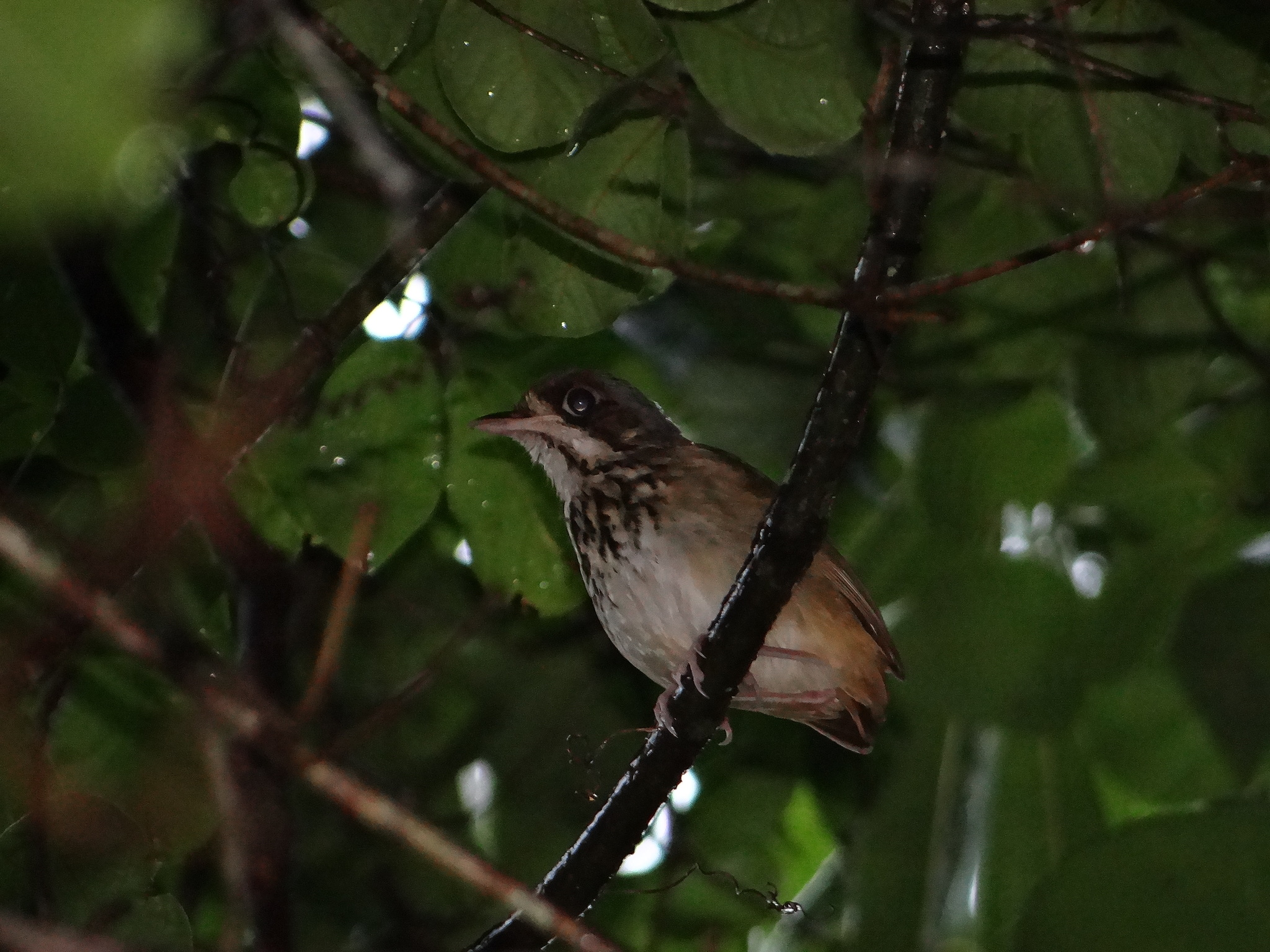

Conservation status
- Vulnerable (IUCN 3.1)

Scientific classification
- Kingdom: Animalia
- Phylum: Chordata
- Class: Aves
- Order: Passeriformes
- Family: Grallariidae
- Genus: Hylopezus
- Species: H. auricularis

Binomial name
- Hylopezus auricularis (Gyldenstolpe, 1941)

Synonyms
- Grallaria auricularis; Hylopezus macularius auricularis

= Masked antpitta =

Species of bird

The masked antpitta (Hylopezus auricularis) is a Vulnerable species of bird in the family Grallariidae. It is endemic to Bolivia.

== Taxonomy and systematics ==
The masked antpitta was originally described in 1941 as Grallaria auricularis. It was soon reclassified by the same author as a subspecies of the spotted antpitta (Hylopezul macularius). A study published in 1998 showed that its vocalizations are quite different from those of other spotted antpitta subspecies, and taxonomic systems then elevated it to species status.

The masked antpitta is monotypic.

== Description ==
The masked antpitta is about 14 cm (5.5 in) long. One male weighed 43 g (1.5 oz) and one female 38 g (1.3 oz). The sexes have the same plumage. Adults have white lores on an otherwise brown face, though with thin pale streaks on their ear coverts. Their crown and nape are gray that adds some olive by the base of the nape. Their upperparts are mostly pale brownish olive with even paler uppertail coverts and their tail is rufescent brown. Their flight feathers are dark brown with varying amounts of olive and cinnamon edges on the tertials. Their wing coverts are mostly orangish buff with some brown bases and tips. They have a wide white "moustache" with a wide black stripe below it. Their chin and throat are white. Their breast is creamy white with heavy black streaking. The streaking continues onto the flanks which have a yellow buff base color. Their central belly is unmarked white and their undertail coverts warm buff. They have a dark brown iris, a black maxilla, an ivory or pinkish white mandible, and pinkish white legs and feet.

== Distribution and habitat ==
The masked antpitta is known from only a few sites in Bolivia's Beni and Pando departments in the far western Amazon Basin. Most records are from near the town of Riberalta in northern Beni on the Pando border. It apparently once occupied a larger area. It inhabits secondary forest filled with dense tangled vegetation as around the edges of open areas; it apparently favors muddy areas. In elevation it occurs between about 100 and 200 m (330 and 660 ft) above sea level.

== Behavior ==
=== Movement ===
The masked antpitta is resident throughout its range.

=== Feeding ===
The masked antpitta's diet has not been detailed but is known to include insects. It forages mostly on the ground where it probes leaf litter and soil to find prey. It is usually seen singly or in pairs.

=== Breeding ===
The masked antpitta's breeding season appears to span from September to February. Its nest is a wide shallow cup woven from thin sticks and a few dead leaves, lined with flexibly rootlets and fungal rhizomorphs, and built on a platform of larger sticks and leaves. The six well known nests were supported by stems, vines, and small branches between 0.9 and 2.1 m (3 and 7 ft) above the ground. The three known clutches were each of two eggs. Both parents constructed the nest and incubated the clutch. The incubation period, time to fledging, and details of parental care are not known because the nests were predated before hatch.

=== Vocalization ===
The masked antpitta's song is "a slow, trilling, slightly descending series of hollow and high-pitched cu notes" whose 40 or so notes last three or four seconds. One call is "a quick succession of 2-3 melodious fuí notes, followed by short, lower-pitched cuu. Another is a single note.

== Status ==
The IUCN has assessed the masked antpitta as Vulnerable. It has a very small range; its estimated population of 500 mature individuals is believed to be stable. "The species prefers secondary, degraded vegetation and as such, it is threatened by the succession of secondary growth into mature forest." "No effects [of human activity] have been specifically documented, but Masked Antpitta probably is fairly adaptable. In some areas it may even benefit from mild habitat disturbance."
