= Elusive antpitta =

Conservation status
- Least Concern (IUCN 3.1)

Scientific classification
- Kingdom: Animalia
- Phylum: Chordata
- Class: Aves
- Order: Passeriformes
- Family: Grallariidae
- Genus: Grallaria
- Species: G. eludens

Binomial name
- Grallaria eludens Lowery & O'Neill, 1969

Species of bird

The elusive antpitta (Grallaria eludens) is a species of bird in the family Grallariidae. It is found in Brazil and Peru.

== Taxonomy and systematics ==
The elusive antpitta is monotypic. It and the ochre-striped antpitta (G. dignissima) are sister species.

== Description ==
Grallaria antpittas are a "wonderful group of plump and round antbirds whose feathers are often fluffed up...they have stout bills [and] very short tails". The elusive antpitta is 17 to 19 cm (6.7 to 7.5 in) long; three specimens weighed 111 to 115 g (3.9 to 4.1 oz). The sexes have the same plumage. Adults have a warm brown crown, nape, and upperparts with black streaks on the lower back and rump. Their wings are warm brown with a rufescent cast. Their tail is dark gray with small white tips on the feathers. They have tawny rufous-brown lores and tawny-olive ear coverts. Their chin and upper throat are white and appear shaggy. Their lower throat and breast are creamy buff with some thin black streaks on the side. Their belly is white and their flanks white with blackish brown or dark gray streaks. Both sexes have a brown iris, a dusky maxilla, a pinkish gray mandible, and blue-gray legs and feet.

== Distribution and habitat ==
The elusive antpitta is a bird of the far western Amazon Basin. It is found in eastern Peru from eastern Loreto Department south to central Madre de Dios and in western Brazil's Amazonas and Acre states. It inhabits the floor of tall mature terra firme rainforest. It appears to favor areas of dense vegetation along streams. All of the few records are at elevations between 120 and 500 m (400 and 1,600 ft) above sea level.

== Behavior ==
=== Movement ===
The elusive antpitta is believed to be resident throughout its range.

=== Feeding ===
The elusive antpitta's diet and foraging behavior are not known, though it almost certainly feeds mostly on invertebrates captured on or near the ground.

=== Breeding ===
The elusive antpitta's apparent breeding season spans at least from February to July. Nothing else is known about its breeding biology.

=== Vocalization ===
The elusive antpitta's song is "a pair of low whistled notes, the second sliding down in pitch hoo HEEeeoo". Its call is not well known but is described as "a slightly descending, quavering trill".

== Status ==
The IUCN originally in 1988 assessed the elusive antpitta as Near Threatened and since 2011 as being of Least Concern. It has a limited range and an unknown population size and trend. "Although its forests within its range are still relatively intact, the region is subject to some selective logging and is being opened up for development, with oil/gas extraction and mining, and associated road-building and human colonisation resulting in further degradation". The species is known in several protected areas and is suspected to occur in some others. "Undoubtedly, however, such a reclusive, understory bird will be severely affected by any fragmentation of their forested habitat."
