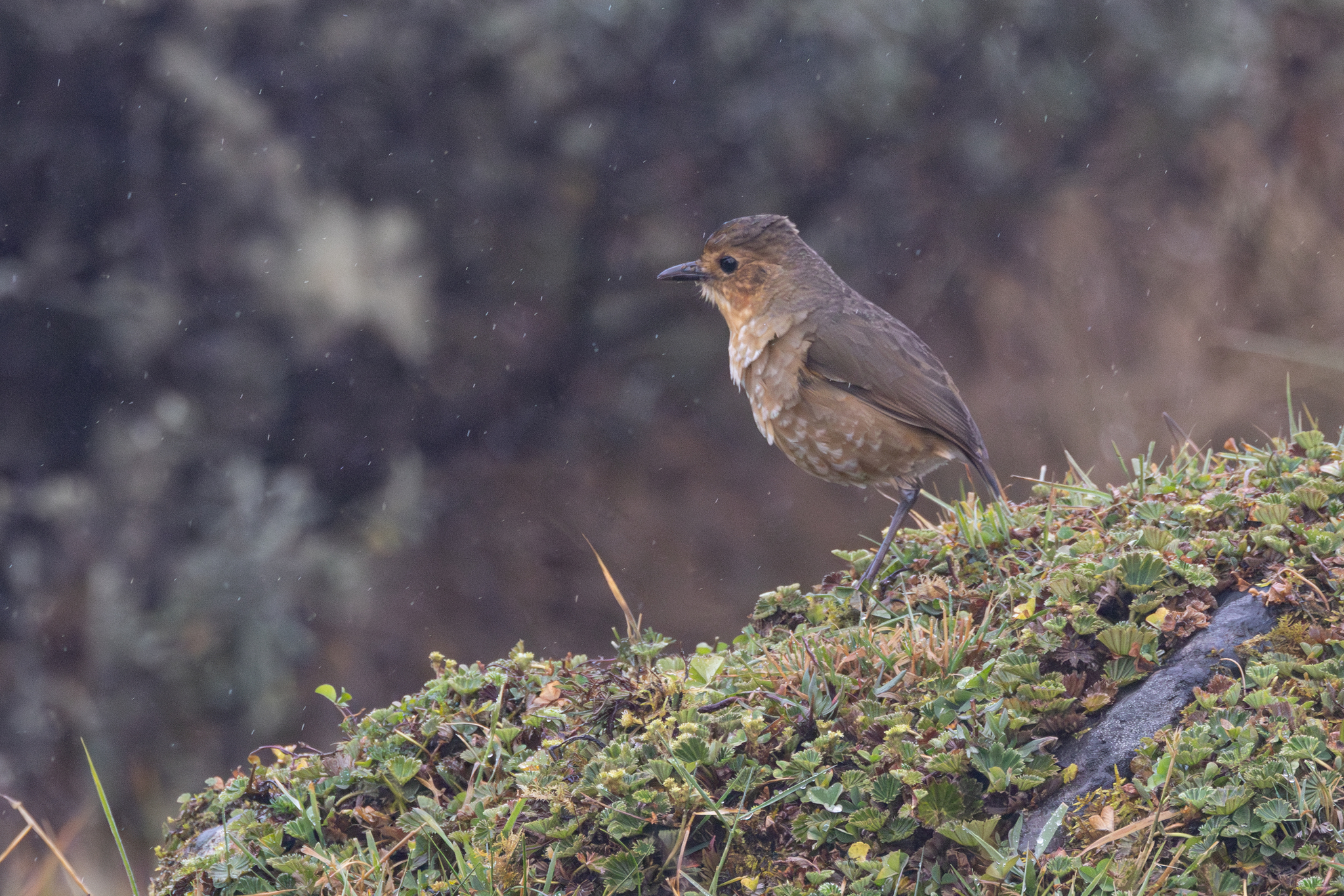

Conservation status
- Least Concern (IUCN 3.1)

Scientific classification
- Kingdom: Animalia
- Phylum: Chordata
- Class: Aves
- Order: Passeriformes
- Family: Grallariidae
- Genus: Grallaria
- Species: G. alticola

Binomial name
- Grallaria alticola Todd, 1919
- Range in Colombia

= Boyaca antpitta =

Species of bird

The Boyaca antpitta, or northern tawny antpitta, (Grallaria alticola) is a species of bird in the family Grallariidae. It is endemic to Colombia.

== Taxonomy and systematics ==
The Boyaca antpitta was formerly considered to be a subspecies of the tawny antpitta (Grallaria quitensis). A 2003 publication suggested that it might be a full species. In 2016 BirdLife International's Handbook of the Birds of the World (HBW) recognized it as a separate species, the northern tawny antpitta. The International Ornithological Committee (IOC) recognized it in July 2023 with the name Boyaca antpitta. The Clements taxonomy recognized the new species with that name in October 2023 and HBW adopted the IOC name in December 2023. However, as of July 2024 the South American Classification Committee of the American Ornithological Society had not recognized the split, though it did acknowledge the 2003 publication's suggestion.

== Description ==
The Boyaca antpitta is about 16 cm (6.3 in) long and apparently weighs between 45 and 60 g (1.6 and 2.1 oz). The sexes have the same plumage. Adults have pale buff lores and are whitish around the eye on an otherwise olive brown to rufous olive face. They have mostly pale brown to olive brown crown, nape, back, wings, and tail. Their crown and back have a slight gray wash and their rump is browner, almost clay-colored. Their primaries have pale buff leading edges and blackish to blackish olive trailing vanes. Their chin and throat are whitish. The rest of their underparts are mostly tawny brown with indistinct white mottling. The center of their belly is whitish, their flanks paler than their breast, and their undertail coverts a richer rufescent tawny. They have a dark brown iris, a black to blackish gray bill, and dark brownish to blackish legs and feet.

== Distribution and habitat ==
The Boyaca antpitta is found on the spine of Colombia's Eastern Andes in Santander, Boyacá, and Cundinamarca departments and the Capital District. It primarily inhabits the páramo and nearby montane forest but can be found in almost any open landscape within its elevational range. In elevation it mostly occurs between 2,800 and 4,000 m (9,200 and 13,100 ft).

== Behavior ==
=== Movement ===
The Boyaca antpitta is believed to be a year-round resident throughout its range.

=== Feeding ===
The Boyaca antpitta's diet is not well documented but it is assumed to feed on a variety of insects and other invertebrates. It usually forages by itself, on the ground, hopping and pausing to flick aside leave litter, to probe mosses and the ground, and to glean from vegetation.

=== Breeding ===
The Boyaca antpitta apparently breeds at almost any time of the year. Nothing else is known about the species' breeding biology. Its nest, eggs, and breeding behavior are assumed to be similar to those of its former parent tawny antpitta, which see here.

=== Vocalization ===
Despite its generally open habitat, the Boyaca antpitta is more often heard than seen. Its vocalization was the principal reason it was recognized as a species. Its song is "an initial overslurred note, a short pause, and then 3‒5 notes in a stuttered series" that lasts about 1.0 to 1.5 seconds. Its call is a single repeated note. The species is heard most often around dawn but vocalizes at any time of day. It vocalizes from the ground or a prominent perch.

== Status ==
The IUCN has assessed the Boyaca antpitta as being of Least Concern. It has a restricted range; its population size is not known and is believed to be stable. No immediate threats have been identified. It occurs in several national parks. "Nevertheless, Boyaca Antpitta's páramo habitat is increasingly threatened, and populations are undoubtedly facing ongoing and ever-increasing pressure from habitat fragmentation and destruction."
