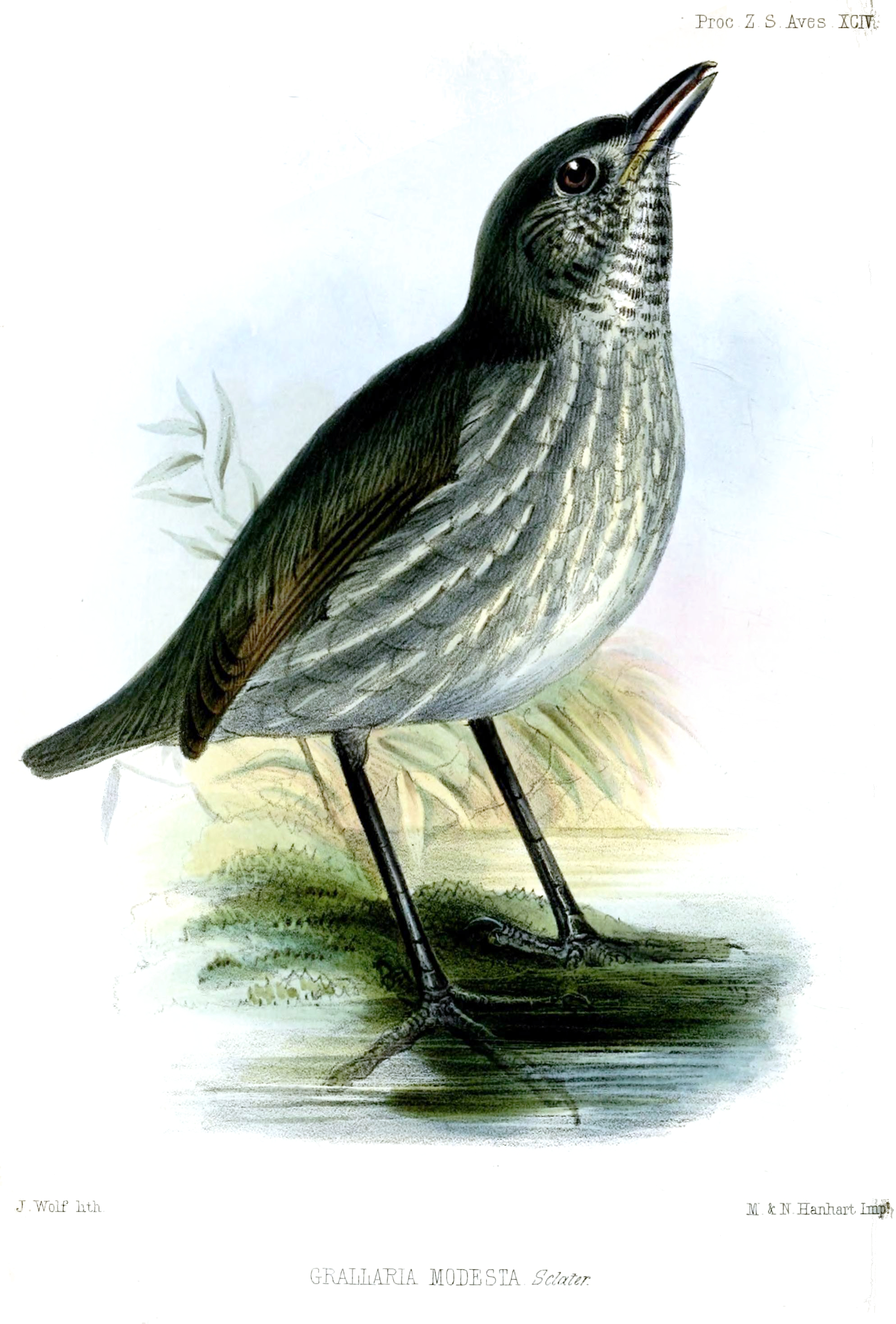
- Thrush-like antpitta (Myrmothera campanisona)

Scientific classification
- Kingdom: Animalia
- Phylum: Chordata
- Class: Aves
- Order: Passeriformes
- Family: Grallariidae
- Genus: Myrmothera; Vieillot, 1816

Type species
- Myrmornis campanisona Hermann, 1783

= Myrmothera =

Genus of birds

Myrmothera is a genus of birds belonging to the antpitta family Grallariidae that are found in Middle and South America.

== Taxonomy ==
The genus was established in 1816 by the French ornithologist Louis Pierre Vieillot. The type species was subsequently designated by Philip Sclater in 1890 as the thrush-like antpitta. The genus name combines the Ancient Greek μυρμος/murmos meaning "ant" with -θηρας/-thḗras meaning "hunter".

The genus contains 6 species:

- White-lored antpitta (Myrmothera fulviventris) (formerly in Hylopezus) – west Amazonia
- Amazonian antpitta (Myrmothera berlepschi) (formerly in Hylopezus) – south Amazonia
- Thicket antpitta (Myrmothera dives) (formerly in Hylopezus) – east Honduras to west Colombia
- Tepui antpitta (Myrmothera simplex) – tepuis in south Venezuela, west Guyana, and north Brazil
- Thrush-like antpitta (Myrmothera campanisona) – Amazonia
- Tapajos antpitta (Myrmothera subcanescens) – central south Amazonian Brazil

Some other taxonomies, including those followed by the Integrated Taxonomic Information System and Handbook of Birds of the World, consider the Tapajos antpitta to be a subspecies of the thrush-like antpitta. Based on DNA analysis, the genus is considered to be a sister taxon to the genus Hylopezus.
