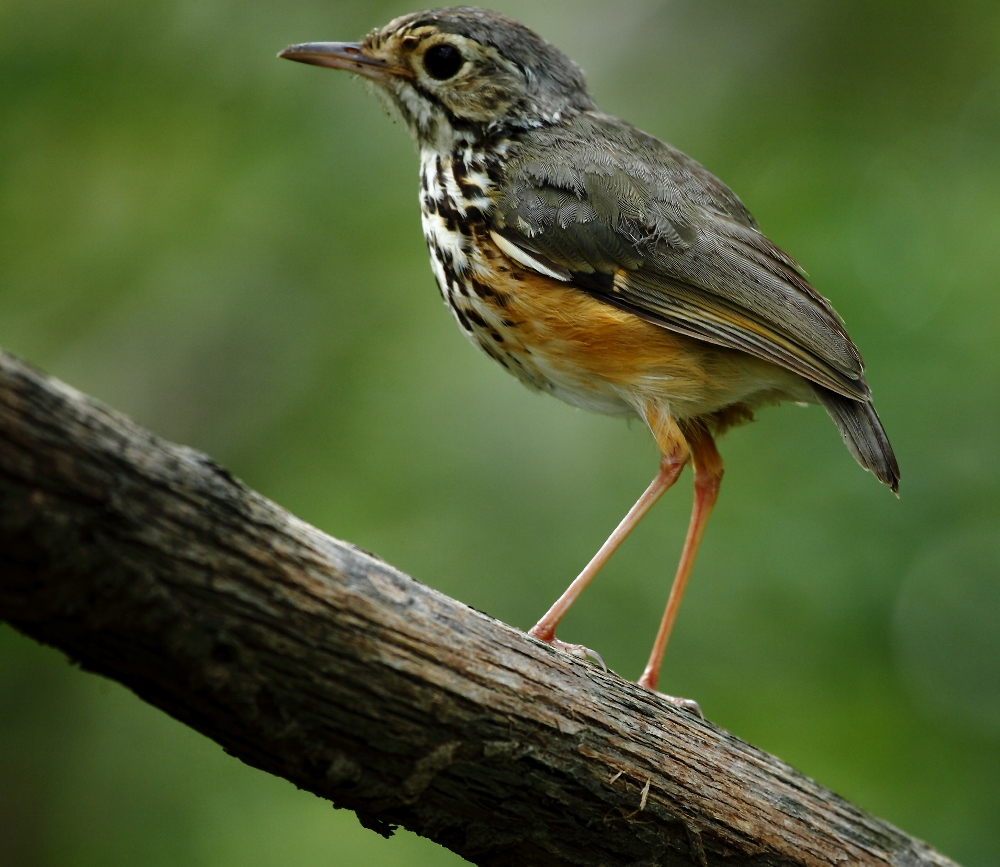
- at Araripe, state of Ceará, Brazil.

Conservation status
- Least Concern (IUCN 3.1)

Scientific classification
- Kingdom: Animalia
- Phylum: Chordata
- Class: Aves
- Order: Passeriformes
- Family: Grallariidae
- Genus: Hylopezus
- Species: H. ochroleucus

Binomial name
- Hylopezus ochroleucus (Wied, 1831)

= White-browed antpitta =

Species of bird

The white-browed antpitta (Hylopezus ochroleucus) is a species of bird in the family Grallariidae. It is endemic to Brazil.

== Taxonomy and systematics ==
The white-browed antpitta is monotypic. However, for a time in the mid-twentieth century what is now the speckle-breasted antpitta (Cryptopezus nattereri) was treated as a subspecies of it. They were separated following a 1995 publication that detailed differences in their vocalizations, plumage, and habitat.

== Description ==
The white-browed antpitta is 12 to 14 cm (4.7 to 5.5 in) long and weighs about 28 g (0.99 oz). The sexes have the same plumage. Adults have white to buffy white lores. They have a white to buffy white streak with thin black borders behind the eye. Their ear coverts are buffy olive or grayish olive with faint white streaks. Their forehead, crown, and nape are gray-olive and their upperparts and tail are olive-gray. Their flight feathers are a brownish olive-gray with ochraceous edges on the front of the primaries. Their wing coverts are dark with light buff tips. Their throat is white with a black line down from the bill. Their breast is mostly white with darker streaks and spots and their central belly and undertail coverts are pale buff or whitish. The rest of their underparts, sides, and flanks are buffy ochraceous. They have a dark brown iris, a black bill with a paler base to the mandible, and pink to grayish pink legs and feet.

== Distribution and habitat ==
The white-browed antpitta is found in the caatinga region of eastern Brazil from western Ceará south into northern Mato Grosso. It primarily inhabits the understory of semi-deciduous woodland but also inhabits deciduous woodlands. In elevation it occurs between 400 and 1,000 m (1,300 and 3,300 ft).

== Behavior ==
=== Movement ===
The white-browed antpitta is believed to be resident throughout its range.

=== Feeding ===
The white-browed antpitta's diet has not been detailed but is assumed to consist of arthropods, earthworms, and other small invertebrates. It forages while walking and hopping on the forest floor, seeking prey by probing into leaf litter and soil.

=== Breeding ===
Nothing is known about the white-browed antpitta's breeding biology.

=== Vocalization ===
The white-browed antpitta's song is a "series in 3 parts, 1st ascending, 2nd with double-noted notes, last 3-noted, sounding like 'piupiu-piupiu tetju tetju tetju tetjutu' ". The species sings from a low perch within thick foliage.

== Status ==
The IUCN originally in 2004 assessed the white-browed antpitta as Near Threatened and since 2022 as being of Least Concern. It has a large range; its population size is not known and is believed to be decreasing. "Deforestation of caatinga for timber extraction and agricultural expansion, as well as understorey degradation by intensive grazing, must have adversely affected the species. The extent of these threats has accelerated since c.1970." It is known from only a few protected areas.
