= Ochre-striped antpitta =

Conservation status
- Least Concern (IUCN 3.1)

Scientific classification
- Kingdom: Animalia
- Phylum: Chordata
- Class: Aves
- Order: Passeriformes
- Family: Grallariidae
- Genus: Grallaria
- Species: G. dignissima

Binomial name
- Grallaria dignissima Sclater, PL & Salvin, 1880

Species of bird

The ochre-striped antpitta (Grallaria dignissima) is a species of bird in the family Grallariidae. It is found in Colombia, Ecuador, and Peru.

== Taxonomy and systematics ==
The ochre-striped antpitta was first described as Grallaria dignissima by Sclater and Salvin and illustrated by John Gerrard Keulemans in 1880. In the first half of the twentieth century several authors moved it to genus Thamnocharis; that genus was later subsumed into Grallaria so the species returned to its original binomial. The ochre-striped antpitta and the elusive antpitta (G. eludens) are sister species.

The ochre-striped antpitta is monotypic.

== Description ==
Grallaria antpittas are a "wonderful group of plump and round antbirds whose feathers are often fluffed up...they have stout bills [and] very short tails". The ochre-striped antpitta is 15 to 19 cm (5.9 to 7.5 in) long; one male weighed 110 g (3.9 oz). The sexes have almost the same plumage. Adult males have a gray-brown crown and nape. Their back, rump, and tail are olive-brown with black and white streaks on the lower back and rump. They have buff lores and buffy brown ear coverts. Their throat and breast are ochraceous brown that becomes black and white streaks on the lower breast and belly. Adult females have warmer brown upperparts and a more rufescent throat and breast than males. Both sexes have a dark brown iris, a dark brown or gray brown bill with a pale basal half of the mandible, and gray legs and feet.

== Distribution and habitat ==
The ochre-striped antpitta is a bird of the western Amazon Basin. It is found from southeastern Colombia south through eastern Ecuador and northern Peru to the Marañón River. It inhabits the floor of tall mature terra firme rainforest. It favors areas along streams, in dense vegetation like that in regenerating treefall openings, and very seldom is found on steep slopes. In elevation it occurs up to 300 m (1,000 ft) in Colombia and 450 m (1,500 ft) in Ecuador and Peru.

== Behavior ==
=== Movement ===
The ochre-striped antpitta is believed to be resident throughout its range.

=== Feeding ===
The ochre-striped antpitta's diet is not known, though it almost certainly feeds mostly on invertebrates. It is almost exclusively terrestrial, running and hopping on the ground.

=== Breeding ===
Nothing is known about the ochre-striped antpitta's breeding biology.

=== Vocalization ===
The ochre-striped antpitta's song is a "low, mournful, two-note whü, whaöw or whü, whüüw that lasts a little more than a second. The song has also been written as "hoo HEEeeoo". The species' call is "a descending, rolling, musical trill".

== Status ==
The IUCN has assessed the ochre-striped antpitta as being of Least Concern. It has a large range; its population size is not known and is believed to be stable. No immediate threats have been identified. The species is considered rare throughout its range "and thus may be more severely impacted by habitat fragmentation than other small birds".
