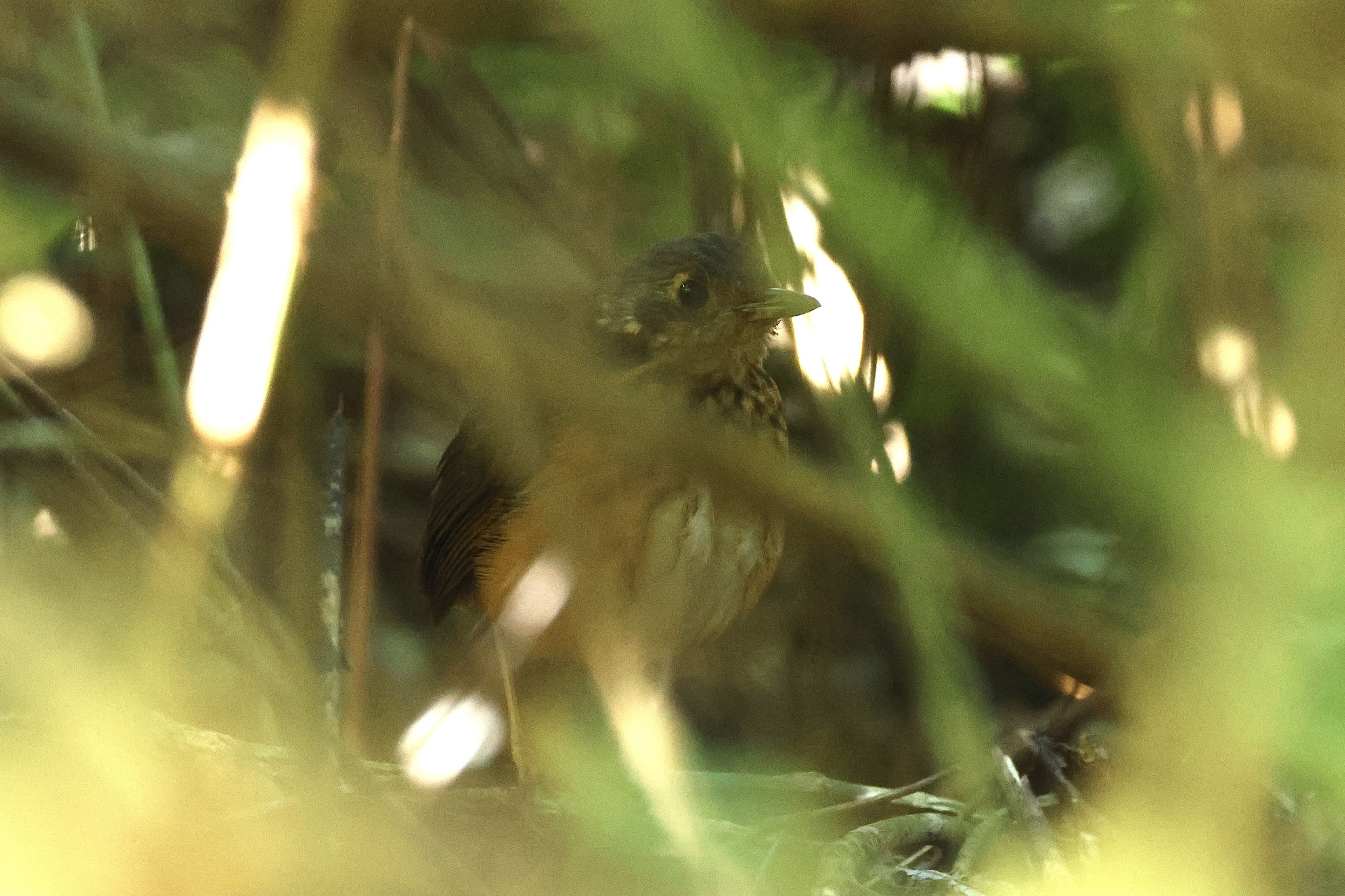

Conservation status
- Least Concern (IUCN 3.1)

Scientific classification
- Kingdom: Animalia
- Phylum: Chordata
- Class: Aves
- Order: Passeriformes
- Family: Grallariidae
- Genus: Myrmothera
- Species: M. dives

Binomial name
- Myrmothera dives (Salvin, 1865)

Synonyms
- Grallaria dives; Hylopezus dives; Myrmothera fulviventris dives

= Thicket antpitta =

Species of bird

The thicket antpitta (Myrmothera dives) is a species of bird in the family Grallariidae. It is found in Colombia, Costa Rica, Honduras, Nicaragua, and Panama.

== Taxonomy and systematics ==
The thicket antpitta was originally described in 1865 as Grallaria dives. It was later transferred to genus Hylopezus and still later to Myrmothera. The thicket antpitta was long considered a subspecies of the white-lored antpitta (M. fulviventris); the combined species was called the "fulvous-bellied antpitta".

The thicket antpitta has three subspecies, the nominate M. d. dives (Salvin, 1865), M. d. flammulatus (Griscom, 1928), and M. d. barbacoae (Chapman, 1914).

== Description ==
The thicket antpitta is 13 to 16.5 cm (5.1 to 6.5 in) long; four individuals weighed between 38 and 44 g (1.3 and 1.6 oz). The sexes have the same plumage. Adults of the nominate subspecies have a buff loral patch and buff around their eye. Their crown, nape, and ear coverts are dull slate gray. Their upperparts are dull slate gray that becomes olive by the rump; their back has faint pale buffy streaks. Their uppertail coverts and tail are russet brown. Their wings are mostly dark olive-brown with paler rufescent brown outer webs on the primaries. Their throat is white or buffy white. Their breast is ochraceous with black streaks, their belly white, and their sides, flanks, and undertail coverts unstreaked ochraceous to rufous-tawny. Subspecies M. d. flammulatus is overall darker than the nominate, with more richly colored wings and heavier black streaks on the breast. M. d. barbacoae is slightly darker overall than the nominate, with chestnut edges on the primaries and heavier black streaks on the breast. All subspecies have a dark brown iris, a blackish bill with a pale base to the mandible, and pale pinkish gray legs and feet.

== Distribution and habitat ==
The thicket antpitta has a disjunct distribution. The nominate subspecies is found on the Caribbean slope from eastern Honduras south through Nicaragua and Costa Rica. Subspecies M. d. flammulatus is found only in western and central Bocas del Toro Province in western Panama. M. d. barbacoae is found from eastern Darién Province in eastern Panama south along the Pacific slope of Colombia to western Nariño Department. The species inhabits the edges of forest, stream corridors, young secondary forest, and openings in mature forest such as those caused by fallen trees, all areas characterized by dense tangled thickets. It also occurs in cacao and banana plantations. In elevation it occurs up to 1,000 m (3,300 ft) in Colombia and most of Central America though only to 900 m (3,000 ft) in Costa Rica.

== Behavior ==
=== Movement ===
The thicket antpitta is believed to be a year-round resident throughout its range.

=== Feeding ===
The thicket antpitta's diet has not been detailed but apparently is mostly arthropods and perhaps includes small vertebrates such as frogs. It is usually seen singly as it forages while hopping and walking on the forest floor and downed logs.

=== Breeding ===
The thicket antpitta apparently breeds at least between March and May in Colombia. Nothing else is known about the species' breeding biology.

=== Vocalization ===
The thicket antpitta's song "lasts around 1.6–2 seconds, and consists of a rapid ascending series of 10–13 clear whistles increasing in volume, accelerating slightly towards the end, and ending abruptly". Its alarm call is "an accelerating roll".

== Status ==
The IUCN has assessed the thicket antpitta as being of Least Concern. It has a very large range; its estimated population of at least 50,000 mature individuals is believed to be decreasing. No immediate threats have been identified. It is considered "uncommon to fairly common" in Honduras, "fairly uncommon" in Costa Rica, and "fairly common" in Colombia. It occurs in several protected areas. "No effects of human activity have been thoroughly documented [but] at least some degree of human disturbance may in some ways be a benefit to this species."
