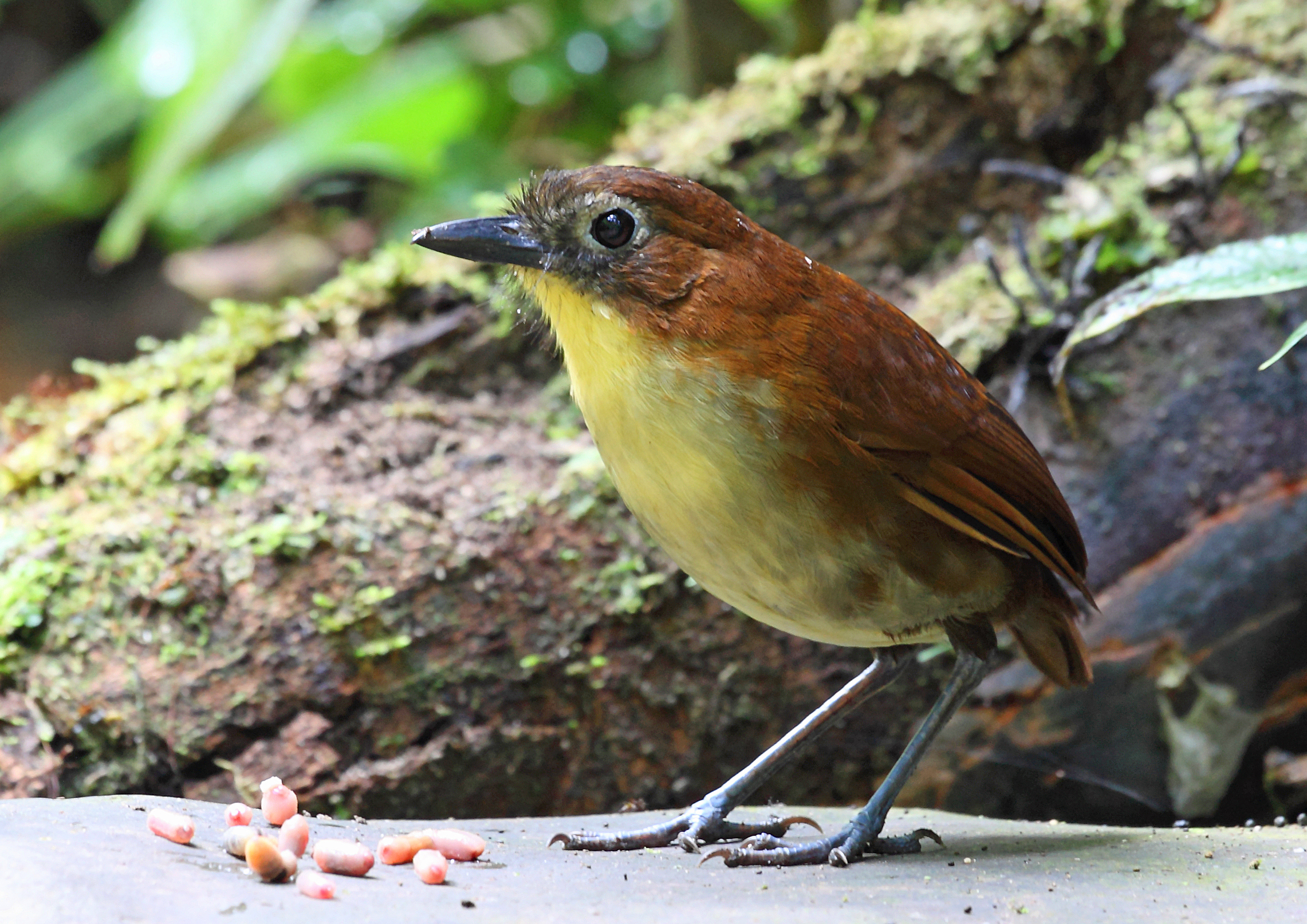

Conservation status
- Least Concern (IUCN 3.1)

Scientific classification
- Kingdom: Animalia
- Phylum: Chordata
- Class: Aves
- Order: Passeriformes
- Family: Grallariidae
- Genus: Grallaria
- Species: G. flavotincta

Binomial name
- Grallaria flavotincta Sclater, PL, 1877

= Yellow-breasted antpitta =

Species of bird

The yellow-breasted antpitta (Grallaria flavotincta) is a species of bird in the family Grallariidae. It is found in Colombia and Ecuador.

== Taxonomy and systematics ==
The yellow-breasted antpitta was originally described as a species. In the mid-twentieth century many authors treated it as a subspecies of the white-bellied antpitta (G. hypoleuca) but by the end of the century it had been returned to full species status.

The yellow-breasted antpitta is monotypic.

== Description ==
Grallaria antpittas are a "wonderful group of plump and round antbirds whose feathers are often fluffed up...they have stout bills [and] very short tails". The yellow-breasted antpitta is 17 to 18 cm (6.7 to 7.1 in) long; one individual weighed 63 g (2.2 oz). The sexes have the same plumage. Adults have a dusky gray forecrown and lores with pale bluish- or grayish white bare skin around the eye. Their crown, back, rump, wings, and tail are unmarked rufous brown. Their underparts are mostly white with an obvious yellow wash that is darkest on the throat and upper breast and becomes white on the sides, flanks, and lower belly. The rufous brown of their upperparts extends irregularly onto their sides, flanks, and crissum. Both sexes of adults have a dark brown iris, a black bill, and bluish gray legs and feet. Juveniles have an almost entirely dark gray head with bare yellowish to orangish yellow skin around their eye. Their upperparts are like the adults' with some irregular dark gray patches. Their throat is mostly gray with only a hint of yellow. The rest of their underparts are mottled with yellow and gray and have some chestnut brown splotches. They have a dusky gray maxilla with a slightly paler tip, a bright orange mandible, and pinkish gray to pinkish blue legs and feet.

== Distribution and habitat ==
The yellow-breasted antpitta is found along the Pacific slope of the Andes from Antioquia Department in northwestern Colombia south to Pichincha Province in northwestern Ecuador. It primarily inhabits the interior understory of humid montane forest, where it favors steep slopes and areas along watercourses in ravines. It also occurs at the forest edges. In elevation it occurs between 1,300 and 2,100 m (4,300 and 6,900 ft) in Colombia and between 1,500 and 2,350 m (4,900 and 7,700 ft) in Ecuador.

== Behavior ==
=== Movement ===
The yellow-breasted antpitta is resident throughout its range.

=== Feeding ===
The yellow-breasted antpitta is one of several antpittas that regularly come to feeding stations set up to view them. There they are fed earthworms, which are thought to also be a large part of their natural diet. Their diet otherwise is not known. They are almost entirely terrestrial, where they hop along the ground and seek prey by pausing to probe soil and leaf litter.

=== Breeding ===
The yellow-breasted antpitta's breeding season is not known but appears to span at least January to March. One nest has been described. It was a deep bulky cup made of green moss and fern fronds with a few sticks and other material and lined mostly with rootlets. It was 1.5 m (5 ft) above the ground supported and shaded by epiphytes on the side of a tree trunk. It contained two eggs. The species' incubation period, time to fledging, and details of parental care are not known.

=== Vocalization ===
The yellow-breasted antpitta's song is "3 hollow notes, first 2 almost merged, final one higher" and has been written as "pu-püüü-puuh". It responds to recordings with "a drawn-out, shrill and piercing' eeeeeeeeee-yk' ".

== Status ==
The IUCN has assessed the yellow-breasted antpitta as being of Least Concern. It has a somewhat restricted range; its population size is not known and is believed to be stable. No immediate threats have been identified. "No human effects on Yellow-breasted Antpitta have been specifically documented, but given this species apparent preference for intact forest, logging and other habitat-altering activities undoubtedly have an effect." It is uncommon and known only locally in Ecuador where it might best be assessed as Vulnerable. It is also considered local in Colombia though more continuous forest in its range there may make it less at risk than in Ecuador.
