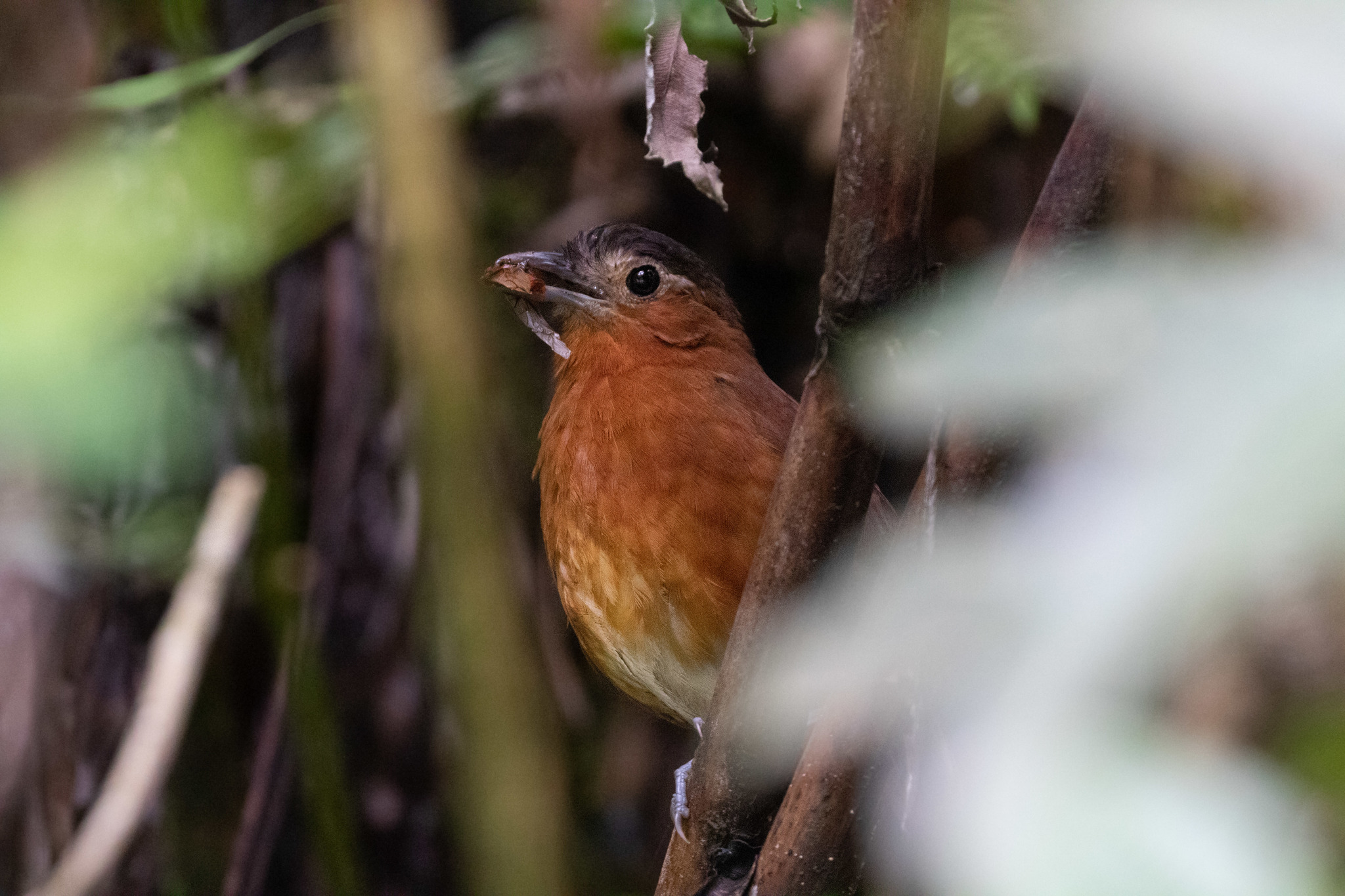
- In Junín, Peru

Conservation status
- Least Concern (IUCN 3.1)

Scientific classification
- Kingdom: Animalia
- Phylum: Chordata
- Class: Aves
- Order: Passeriformes
- Family: Grallariidae
- Genus: Grallaria
- Species: G. capitalis

Binomial name
- Grallaria capitalis Chapman, 1926

= Bay antpitta =

Species of bird

The bay antpitta (Grallaria capitalis) is a species of bird in the family Grallariidae. It is endemic to Peru.

== Taxonomy and systematics ==
The bay antpitta was described in 1926 as a species. In 1970 at least one author treated it as a subspecies of the white-bellied antpitta (G. hypoleuca) but by the late twentieth century it was restored to species status. It is monotypic.

== Description ==
Grallaria antpittas are a "wonderful group of plump and round antbirds whose feathers are often fluffed up...they have stout bills [and] very short tails". The bay antpitta is 16 to 17 cm (6.3 to 6.7 in) long and weighs 65 to 77 g (2.3 to 2.7 oz). The sexes have the same plumage. Adults have a dusky brown or dark russet brown crown. They have a rufous or blackish lores. Their back, rump, wings, and tail are rufous chestnut. Their underparts are mostly rufous that is darker on the breast and paler on the belly; the center of their belly is whitish buff. Both sexes have a dark brown iris, a blue-gray bill, and blue-gray legs and feet.

== Distribution and habitat ==
The bay antpitta is found on the east side of the Peruvian Andes in Huánuco, Pasco, and Junín departments. It inhabits the understory of humid montane forest, often in areas where thick vegetation is regrowing such as in landslide scars, the edges of secondary forest, and abandoned slash-and-burn fields. In elevation it mostly ranges between 1,800 and 3,000 m (5,900 and 9,800 ft) though locally as low as 1,500 m (4,900 ft).

== Behavior ==
=== Movement ===
The bay antpitta is resident throughout its range.

=== Feeding ===
The bay antpitta's diet and foraging behavior have not been detailed but it is known to feed on insects and small snails. It is almost entirely terrestrial, where it runs and hops along the ground, usually in dense vegetation.

=== Breeding ===
Nothing is known about the bay antpitta's breeding biology.

=== Vocalization ===
The bay antpitta's song is "a 4-note (occasionally 5) hollow whistle: HEEP hew-hew-hew. Its call is "a mellow, descending whistle: heeww".

== Status ==
The IUCN has assessed the bay antpitta as being of Least Concern. It has a small range; its population size is not known and is believed to be stable. No immediate threats have been identified. It is considered fairly common. "Human activity has little short-term direct effect on the Bay Antpitta, other than the local effects of habitat destruction. Given that this species occupies regenerating habitats, it may even benefit, locally and in the short term, from human activities, such as a low level of clearing for subsistence agriculture. In the longer term, habitat destruction could pose a significant threat to this species, in view of its small geographic range."
