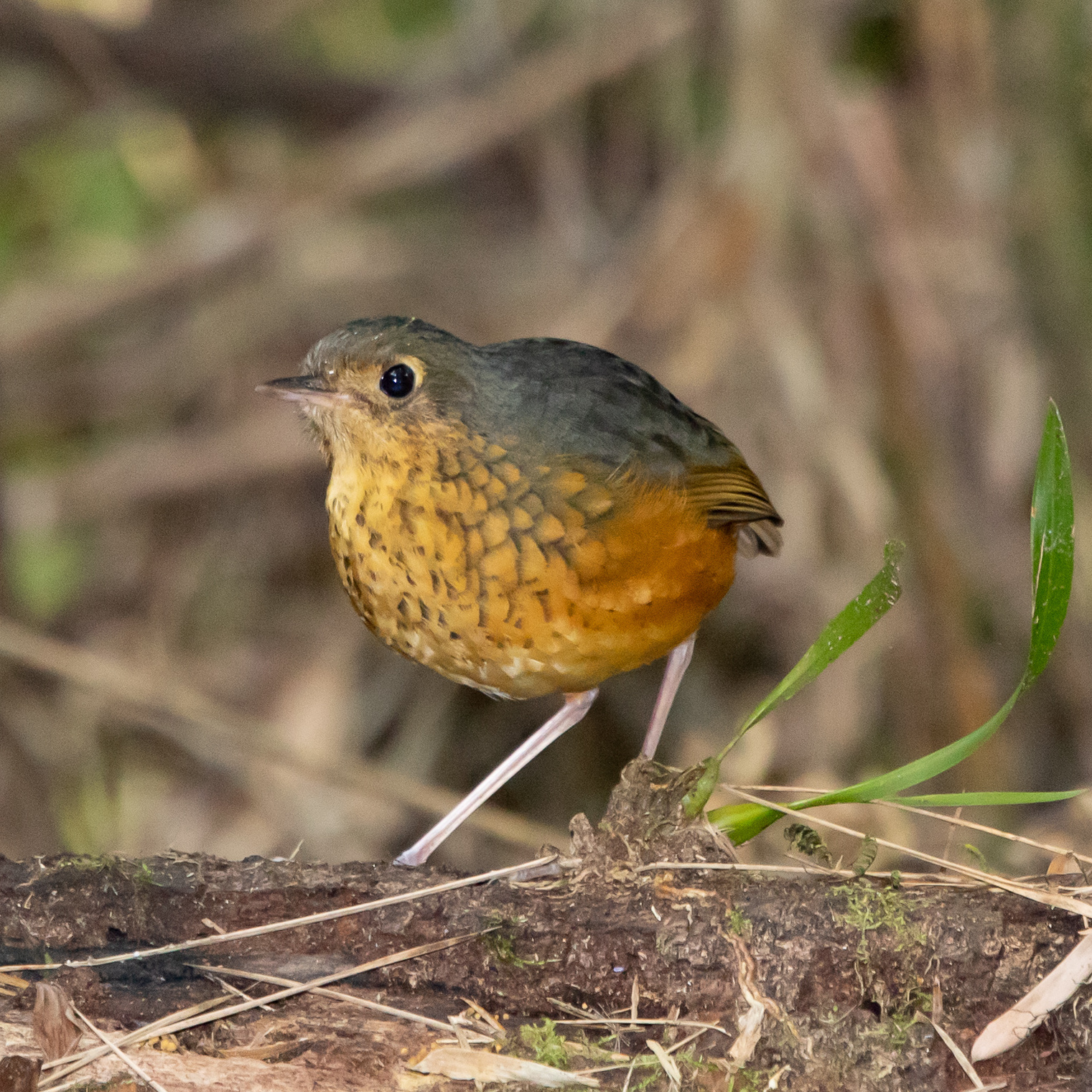
- At São Luiz do Paraitinga, São Paulo State, Brazil

Conservation status
- Least Concern (IUCN 3.1)

Scientific classification
- Kingdom: Animalia
- Phylum: Chordata
- Class: Aves
- Order: Passeriformes
- Family: Grallariidae
- Genus: Cryptopezus; Carneiro, Bravo & Aleixo, 2018
- Species: C. nattereri

Binomial name
- Cryptopezus nattereri (Pinto, 1937)

Synonyms
- Grallaria natteri; Hylopezus ochroleucus natteri; Hylopezus natteri

= Speckle-breasted antpitta =

Speckle-breasted Antpitta

Species of bird

The speckle-breasted antpitta (Cryptopezus nattereri) is a species of bird in the family Grallariidae. It is found in Argentina, Brazil, and Paraguay.

== Taxonomy and systematics ==
The speckle-breasted antpitta has a complicated taxonomic history. It was originally described in 1937 as Grallaria natteri. Soon it was realized that it and several other species did not belong in Grallaria so genus Hylopezus, which had earlier been merged into Grallaria, was resurrected for them. By the middle of the century the speckle-breasted antpitta had been reallocated as a subspecies of the white-browed antpitta (Hylopezus ochroleucus). A 1995 publication showed that it should again be treated as the species Hylopezus natteri. A 2019 publication showed that Hylopezus was paraphyletic with respect to two other genera and that the speckle-breasted antpitta properly belonged to none of them. The authors erected genus Cryptopezus for it.

The speckle-breasted antpitta is the only member of its genus and has no subspecies.

== Description ==
The speckle-breasted antpitta is about 13.5 to 14 cm (5.3 to 5.5 in) long; two males weighed 31 and 33 g (1.1 and 1.2 oz). The sexes have the same plumage. Adults have pale buff lores, a whitish "moustache", and a ring of bare buffy white skin around their eye. Their crown, nape, and upperparts are olive-brown. Their wings are browner than their back, with dark primary coverts that also have a small ochraceous spot. Their throat and the center of their belly are white. Their breast, sides and flanks are pale ochraceous-buff with a darker scallop pattern on the sides and dusky spots on the breast, upper belly, and flanks. They have a dark brown iris, a blackish bill with a pinkish gray base to the mandible, and pinkish gray legs and feet.

== Distribution and habitat ==
The speckle-breasted antpitta is found in Brazil from southern Minas Gerais and western Rio de Janeiro state south to northern Rio Grande do Sul and west into extreme eastern Paraguay and northeastern Argentina's Misiones Province. It inhabits the floor and undergrowth in the interior and edges of humid montane forest and mature secondary woodland. It especially favors areas with dense tangled vegetation and bamboo. In elevation it ranges between 1,200 and 1,900 m (3,900 and 6,200 ft) in the northern part of its range and to below 300 m (1,000 ft) in the south.

== Behavior ==
=== Movement ===
The speckle-breasted antpitta is believed to be resident throughout its range.

=== Feeding ===
The speckle-breasted antpitta's diet is not known. It is primarily terrestrial, and forages with short hops and abrupt stops to study and probe leave litter and soil.

=== Breeding ===
Nothing is known about the speckle-breasted antpitta's breeding biology beyond that a bird was seen in September on a nest made of sticks.

=== Vocalization ===
The speckle-breasted antpitta's song is a "short, fairly fast beautiful, fluted series of about 10 notes increasing in volume and pitch". It typically sings from a perch up to about 2 m (7 ft) above the ground. Its call is "a 1-second rattle...of 7 short, sharply downslurred notes".

== Status ==
The IUCN has assessed the speckle-breasted antpitta as being of Least Concern. It has a large range; its population size is not known and is believed to be stable. No immediate threats have been identified. It is considered fairly common in most of its range and occurs in several protected areas.
