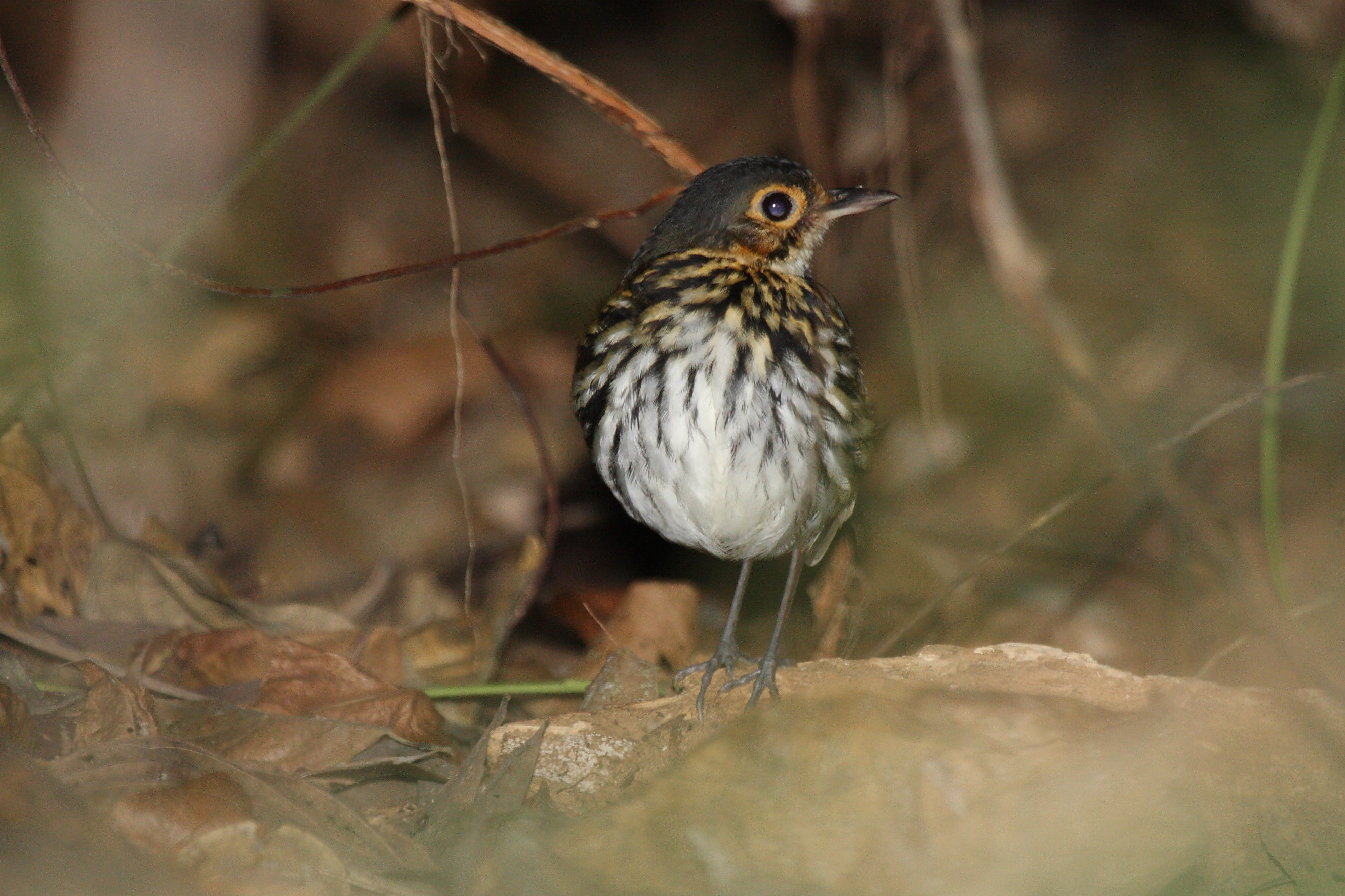
- Streak-chested antpitta (Hylopezus perspicillatus)

Scientific classification
- Kingdom: Animalia
- Phylum: Chordata
- Class: Aves
- Order: Passeriformes
- Family: Grallariidae
- Genus: Hylopezus; Ridgway, 1909

Type species
- Grallaria perspicillata Lawrence, 1861

Species
- 6 recognized species, see article.

= Hylopezus =

Genus of birds

Hylopezus is a genus of bird in the family Grallariidae.

It contains the following species:

- Masked antpitta (Hylopezus auricularis)
- Spotted antpitta (Hylopezus macularius)
- White-browed antpitta (Hylopezus ochroleucus)
- Streak-chested antpitta (Hylopezus perspicillatus)
- Snethlage's antpitta (Hylopezus paraensis)
- Alta Floresta antpitta (Hylopezus whittakeri)
