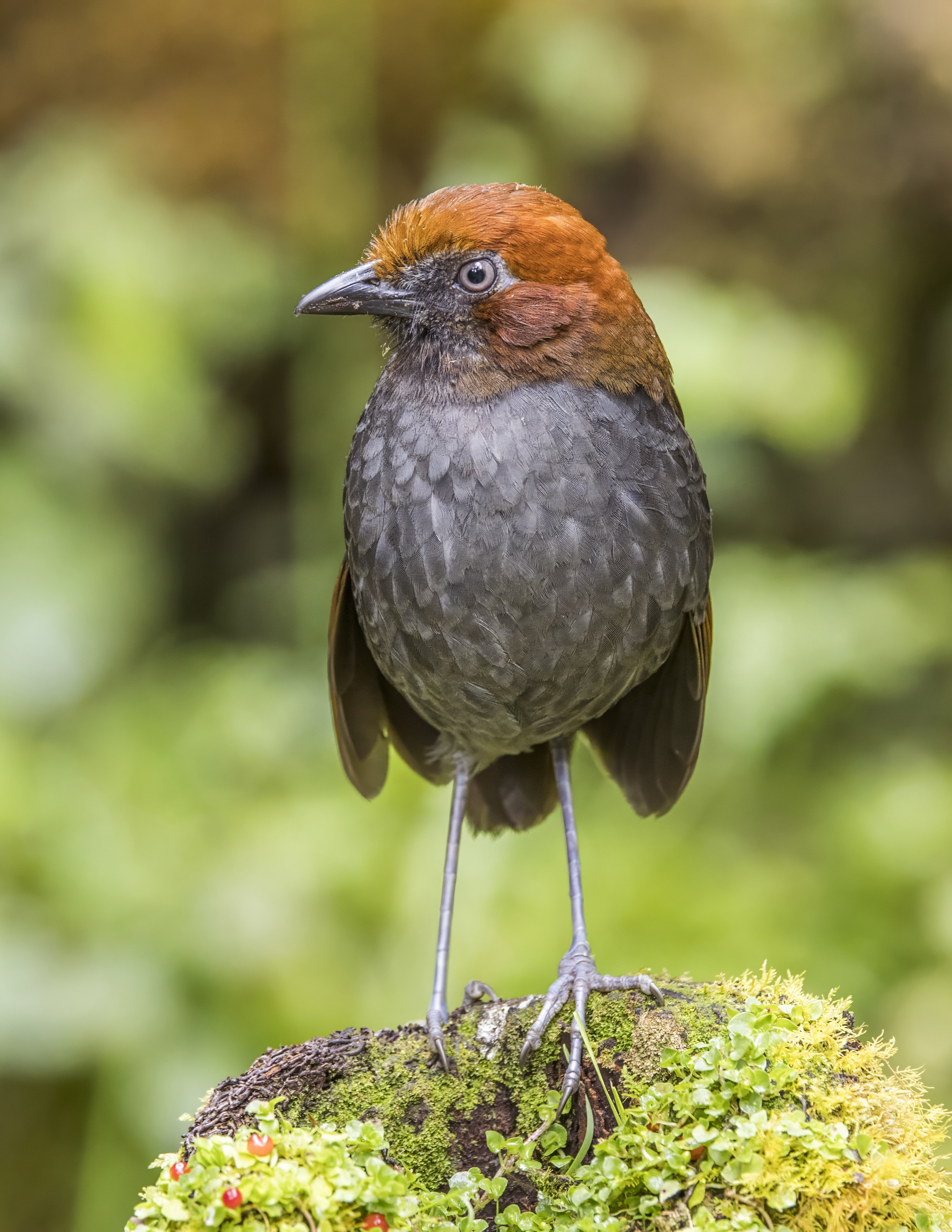
- Chestnut-naped antpitta (Grallaria nuchalis ruficeps)

Scientific classification
- Kingdom: Animalia
- Phylum: Chordata
- Class: Aves
- Order: Passeriformes
- Infraorder: Tyrannides
- Parvorder: Furnariida
- Family: Grallariidae; P.L. Sclater and Salvin, 1873

Genera
- Grallaria; Cryptopezus; Hylopezus; Myrmothera; Grallaricula

= Antpitta =

Family of birds

Grallariidae is a family of smallish suboscine passerine birds of subtropical and tropical Central and South America known as antpittas. They are between 10 and 20 cm (4 and 8 in) long, and are related to the antbirds, Thamnophilidae, and gnateaters, Conopophagidae.

The antpittas were formerly placed in the family Formicariidae. Beginning in 2002 a series of molecular genetic studies found that Formicariidae, as then defined, was non-monophyletic. In 2008, the American Ornithologists' Union reorganised the genera to create monophyletic families and moved the antpittas to their own family Grallariidae. This family now contains 68 species in one large and four fairly small genera.

These are forest birds that tend to feed at or near the ground. Many are specialist ant followers. Their long, powerful legs (which lend the birds a distinctive upright posture) and an essentially vestigial tail aid this behaviour. Most are drab in appearance with shades of rusty, brown, black, and white being their dominant tones.

The antpittas are sexually monomorphic; they resemble the true pittas in that they are virtually tailless; they hop like some thrushes, and are much easier to hear than see—although their vocalizations may be rather atypical for perching birds.

They lay 1 to 6 eggs in a nest in a tree, both sexes incubating.

== Taxonomy ==
The following cladogram shows the phylogeny of the antipitta family. It is based on a large molecular phylogenetic study of the suboscines by Michael Harvey and collaborators that was published in 2020. The three species in the genus Myrmothera were found to be embedded in the genus Hylopezus. The species are those recognised by the International Ornithologists' Union (IOC).

- Grallariidae
  - Grallaria – 47 species
  - - Cryptopezus – speckle-breasted antpitta
    - - Grallaricula – 10 species
      - Hylopezus – 6 species and Myrmothera – 6 species

=== Species ===
Typical antpittas – tribe Grallariini/subfamily Grallariinae

- Genus Grallaria (47 species)

Lesser antpittas – possibly tribe Myrmotherini/subfamily Myrmotherinae

- Genus Cryptopezus (1 species)
- Genus Hylopezus (6 species)
- Genus Myrmothera (6 species)
- Genus Grallaricula (10 species)
