= Refugio Paz de las Aves =

Nature reserve in Ecuador

Coordinates: 0°1′13″N 78°42′26″W

Location in Ecuador

The Refugio Paz de Las Aves (meaning: Peace of the Birds sanctuary) is a 25-hectare (62-acre) private nature reserve in the western foothills of the Ecuadorian Andes. It is located near the equator at 1,969 metres' (6,460 ft) altitude, between Mindo parish and Nanegalito. Besides grassland and secondary forest, 10 ha of the area is covered by primary forest on steep inclines, that is protected by the owners.

It is regularly visited by nature loving tourists and birdwatchers due to the ease with which some deep forest species may be observed here. Six antpitta species are present (giant, yellow-breasted, moustached, chestnut-crowned, scaled and ochre-breasted), which the owners can locate without the use of sound playback. An Andean cock-of-the-rock lek was discovered in 2005, and dark-backed wood-quail and lyre-tailed nightjar are other specialties. Hummingbird feeders have been placed at the edge of the forest.

As of December 2022, more than 430 species of birds have been observed at the Refuge since 2016.
