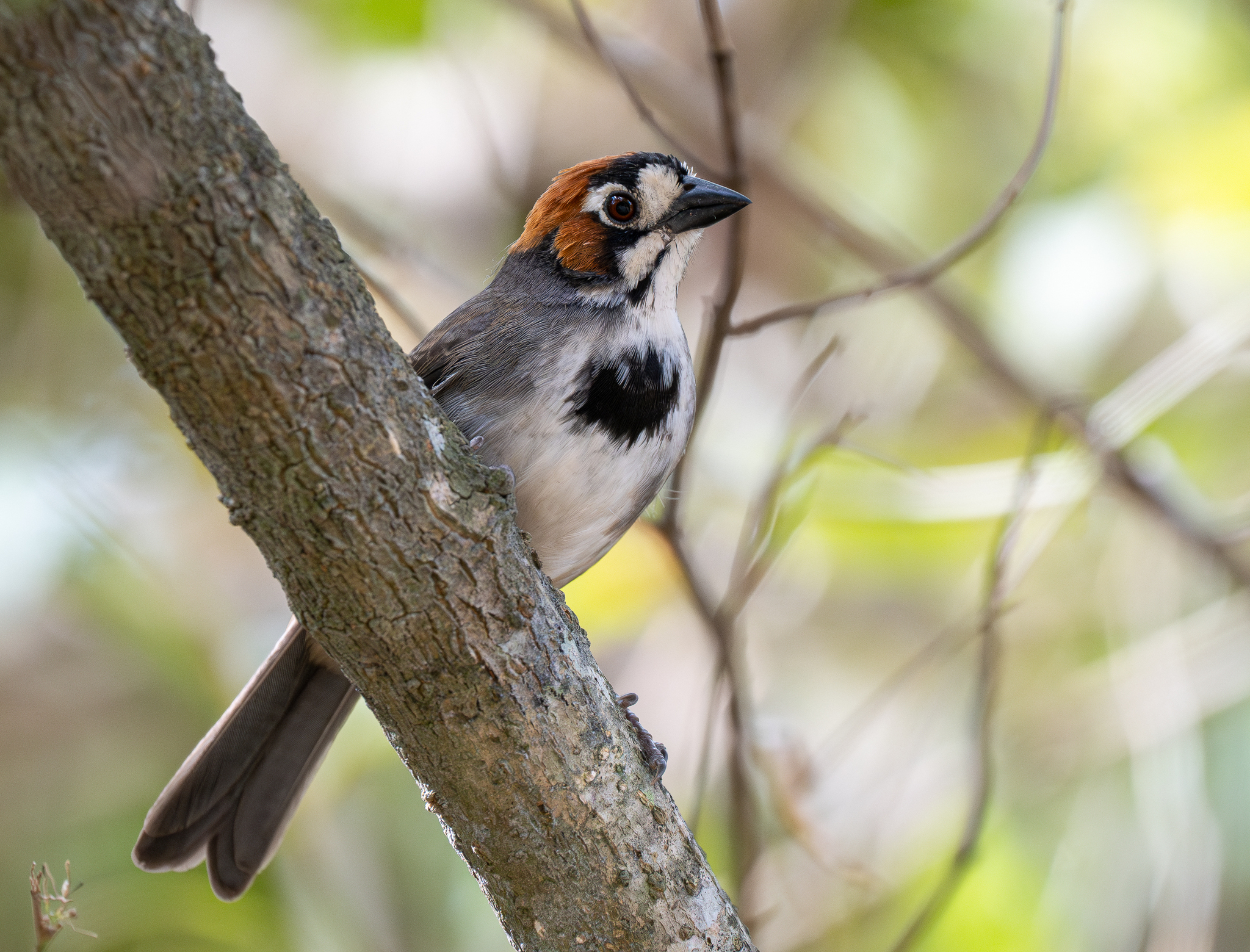

Conservation status
- Near Threatened (IUCN 3.1)

Scientific classification
- Kingdom: Animalia
- Phylum: Chordata
- Class: Aves
- Order: Passeriformes
- Family: Passerellidae
- Genus: Melozone
- Species: M. cabanisi

Binomial name
- Melozone cabanisi (Sclater & Salvin, 1868)

Synonyms
- See text

= Cabanis's ground sparrow =

Species of bird

Cabanis's ground sparrow (Melozone cabanisi) or the Costa Rican ground sparrow is a Near Threatened species of bird in the family Passerellidae, the New World sparrows. It is endemic to Costa Rica.

== Taxonomy and systematics ==
Cabanis's ground sparrow has a complicated taxonomic history. It was formally described by Philip Sclater and Osbert Salvin in 1868 with the binomial Pyrgisoma cabanisi. Some early twentieth century authors treated it as conspecific with the rusty-crowned ground sparrow (Melozone kieneri) and by late in the century most taxonomic systems treated it as a subspecies of Melozone biarcuata (Prevost's or white-faced ground sparrow). In 2012 the IOC again recognized it as a full species. Other systems slowly followed suit.

Cabanis's ground sparrow is monotypic.

== Description ==
Cabanis's ground sparrow is about 15 cm (5.9 in) long. The sexes have the same plumage. Adults have a black forecrown. The rest of their crown and their ear coverts are chestnut or chestnut-rufous; the latter have a thin U-shaped black line around their bottom half. They have white lores, a white eye-ring, and white cheeks, chin, and throat with a thin black "moustache". Their back, scapulars, rump, uppertail coverts, wings, and tail are olive or olive-brown, though their nape, upper back, and lesser wing coverts are somewhat grayish. The centers of their breast and belly are white with a black patch in the middle breast. The sides of their neck and breast are gray, their flanks buffy grayish brown, and their undertail coverts pale buffy. They have a reddish brown iris, a black bill, and horn-colored legs and feet. Juveniles have rusty brownish streaked with dusky where adults are chestnut. Most of their upperparts' feathers have small dusky tips. Where adults have white underparts, juveniles' are pale yellowish with dusky mottling.

== Distribution and habitat ==
Cabanis's ground sparrow is found in the highlands of north-central Costa Rica's Central Valley approximately between northern San José Province and central Cartago Province. It inhabits a variety of somewhat open landscapes including scrubby areas, the edges of forest, hedgerows, shade coffee plantations, and suburban gardens. It also is found in urban areas. In elevation it ranges between 600 and 1,600 m (2,000 and 5,200 ft).

== Behavior ==
=== Movement ===
Cabanis's ground sparrow is a year-round resident.

=== Feeding ===
The diet of Cabanis's ground sparrow has not been detailed but is known to include seeds and small insects. It forages in pairs, on the ground or very low in vegetation. It kicks leaf litter backwards with both feet simultaneously.

=== Breeding ===
Cabanis's ground sparrow breeds mostly between May and September though its season may extend to early November. Its nest is a cup made from somewhat coarse plant material lined with finer fibers including horse hair. It is typically on the ground, on a clump of grass, or in a dense shrub up to about 2 m (7 ft) above the ground. The clutch is two to three eggs that are white or slightly bluish white mottled with cinnamon or reddish brown. The incubation period, time to fledging, and details of parental care are not known. Nests are often parasitized by bronzed cowbirds (Molothrus aeneus).

=== Vocalization ===
The song of Cabanis's ground sparrow is "a high, thin, staccato sputter, a buzzy note, and/or a slow trill followed by 3-4 clear, forceful whistles: Pst-t-t-t peee-peer-peer, bzeew whee-whee-whee, or bzeew tow-hewhewhewhe peer-peer-peer-pee". Its calls include "weak, high, staccato, tsit notes", a sharp whistled "pseee psee psee", and a "sharp, thin pseeer".

== Status ==
The IUCN originally in 2016 assessed Cabanis's ground sparrow as being of Least Concern but since 2020 as Near Threatened. The IUCN estimates its population to be at least 20,000 mature individuals and decreasing. However, a study published in 2020 estimated its population at approximately 3000 to 12,000 mature individuals. "Even though the species occupies a variety of habitats, it seems more and more threatened by land-use change, especially by the conversion of shaded coffee plantations and thickets into urban and suburban habitats." The IUCN states that the species is common but a 2007 field guide calls it uncommon.
