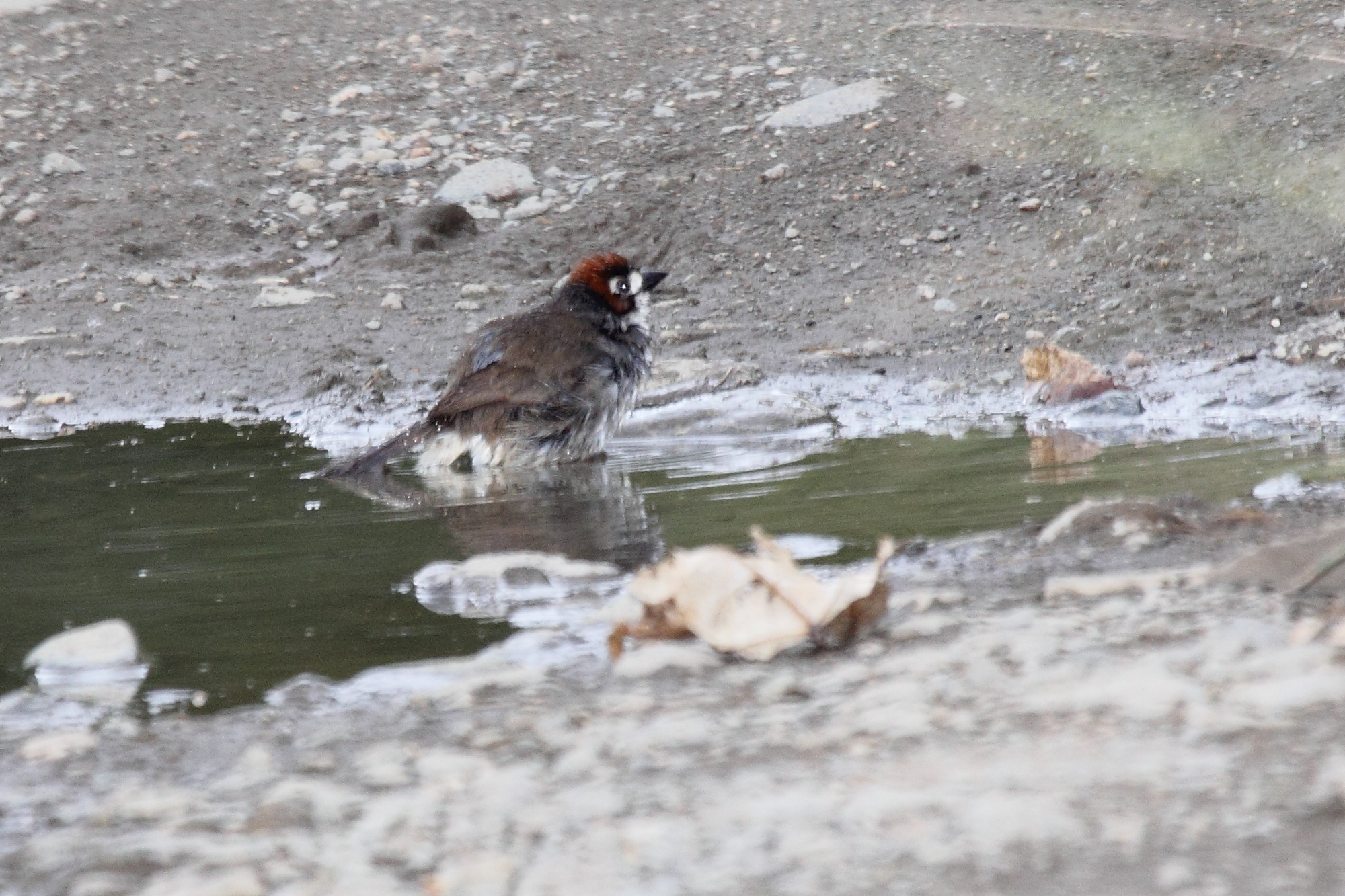

Conservation status
- Least Concern (IUCN 3.1)

Scientific classification
- Kingdom: Animalia
- Phylum: Chordata
- Class: Aves
- Order: Passeriformes
- Family: Passerellidae
- Genus: Melozone
- Species: M. biarcuata

Binomial name
- Melozone biarcuata (Prévost & Des Murs, 1842)

Synonyms
- Melozone biarcuatum

= Prevost's ground sparrow =

Species of bird

Prevost's ground sparrow (Melozone biarcuata, English: /preɪˈvoʊ/ pray-VOH, French: [pʁevo]), also known as the white-faced ground sparrow, is an American sparrow.

== Etymology ==
Its English name commemorates French naturalist Florent Prévost.

== Distribution and habitat ==
This bird breeds at middle altitudes from southern Mexico to western Honduras. The Cabanis's ground sparrow was previously considered a subspecies. It is found typically at altitudes between 600 and 1600 m in the undergrowth and thickets of semi-open woodland, coffee plantations, hedgerows and large gardens.

== Description ==
Prevost's ground sparrow is on average 15 cm long and weighs 28 g. The adult has a stubby dark-grey bill, unstreaked olive-brown upperparts, a rufous crown and mainly white underparts. Young birds are browner above, have yellower underparts, and a duller indistinct head pattern. It has a simple head pattern in which the rufous of the crown extends down the sides of the neck as a half collar behind the white face.

== Behaviour ==
Usually found in pairs, the bird is a shy species best seen at or near dusk. They sometimes venture in the open in the early morning.

=== Breeding ===
The nest, built by the female, is a neat lined cup constructed less than 2 m up in a bush or large tussock. The female lays a clutch of two or three ruddy-blotched white eggs, which she incubates for 12–14 days. The male helps in feeding the chicks. This species is sometimes parasitised by the bronzed cowbird.

=== Feeding ===
The bird feeds on the ground on seeds, fallen berries, insects and spiders.

=== Voice ===
Calls include a thin tsit or a clearer psee. The male's song, given from a hidden perch in the wet season, is a whistled pst’t’t’t peer peer peer whee whee whee.
