= Grey-crowned ground sparrow =

Conservation status
- Least Concern (IUCN 3.1)

Scientific classification
- Kingdom: Animalia
- Phylum: Chordata
- Class: Aves
- Order: Passeriformes
- Family: Passerellidae
- Genus: Melozone
- Species: M. occipitalis

Binomial name
- Melozone occipitalis Salvin, 1878
- Ranges of the grey-crowned and white-eared ground sparrows (see the taxonomy and distribution sections)

Species of bird

The grey-crowned ground sparrow (Melozone occipitalis) is a species of bird in the family Passerellidae, the New World sparrows. It is found in El Salvador, Guatemala, and Mexico.

== Taxonomy and systematics ==
The grey-crowned ground sparrow was formally described in 1878 with the binomial Pyrgisoma occipitale. By the end of the nineteenth century it was being treated as a subspecies of the white-eared ground sparrow (Melozone leucotis). Following two 2017 studies most taxonomic systems again recognized it as a full species, though some did not do so until 2025. However, in both 2018 and 2023 the American Ornithological Society declined to make the change, and as of 2025 AviList intends to revisit the issue.

The grey-crowned ground sparrow is monotypic.

== Description ==
The grey-crowned ground sparrow is about 18 cm (7.1 in) long The sexes have the same plumage. Adults have a mostly black head with a gray stripe on the crown, white patches in front of the eye and on the ear coverts, a broken white eye-ring, and a thin yellow supercilium that continues as a large yellow patch behind the ear coverts and on the sides of the neck. Their upperparts, wings, and tail are brownish and sometimes have an olive cast on the wings. Their throat is black and their breast white with a small black patch in its center. The sides of their breast and their flanks, belly and undertail coverts are gray. Both sexes have a dark red-brown iris, a blackish bill, and pinkish legs and feet. Juveniles have a much less distinct facial pattern than adults. Their back is dark gray with reddish tips on the feathers, their tail reddish brown, and their belly whitish gray.

== Distribution and habitat ==
The grey-crowned ground sparrow has a disjunct distribution. One population is found from western Chiapas in southern Mexico south approximately to Guatemala Department, Guatemala. The other is in El Salvador from near Guatemala south approximately to San Vicente Department. The species inhabits a variety of somewhat open landscapes including many that are human-modified. They include riparian forest, the edges of more extensive forest, coffee plantations, agricultural areas, and thickets in urban areas. It ranges in elevation between 500 and 2,000 m (1,600 and 6,600 ft)

== Behavior ==
=== Movement ===
The grey-crowned ground sparrow is a year-round resident.

=== Feeding ===
The grey-crowned ground sparrow feeds on small seeds, fruits, insects, and other arthropods. It has been observed feeding on other plant material and on waste or discarded human food like rice and crumbs. It forages in pairs and small family groups. It forages mostly on the ground, where between hops it moves leaf litter by kicking backwards with both feet simultaneously. It also feeds in shrubs and trees up to about 5 m (15 ft) above the ground.

=== Breeding ===
Almost nothing is known about the grey-crowned ground sparrow's breeding biology. Its nesting season includes May and June. One nest was "on [the] side of a bank under vines" but was otherwise not described. It held two eggs that were pale blue "with small red flecks". The incubation period, time to fledging, and details of parental care are not known.

=== Vocalization ===
One song of the male grey-crowned ground sparrow is a "ringing, slightly metallic seet!–teet-teea-teu'teu'teu'teu". Another is "an agitated buzzy scold, seee-seeee-zeeee'zeeee'zeeeee'zeeeeu'zeeeeu...". Pairs sometimes sing in duet. Both sexes make chip and seet calls. Males sing solo only during the breeding season; duets and calls are made year-round. Males sing from a perch and mostly soon after dawn.

== Status ==
The IUCN has assessed the grey-crowned ground sparrow as being of Least Concern. It has a restricted range; its population size is not known and is believed to be decreasing. No immediate threats have been identified. It is considered ""uncommon and local" in Guatemala and El Salvador. "Urbanization has eliminated many populations, and the habitats of remaining populations are small and isolated from each other. However, the direct effects of human activity on this species has not been studied directly."
