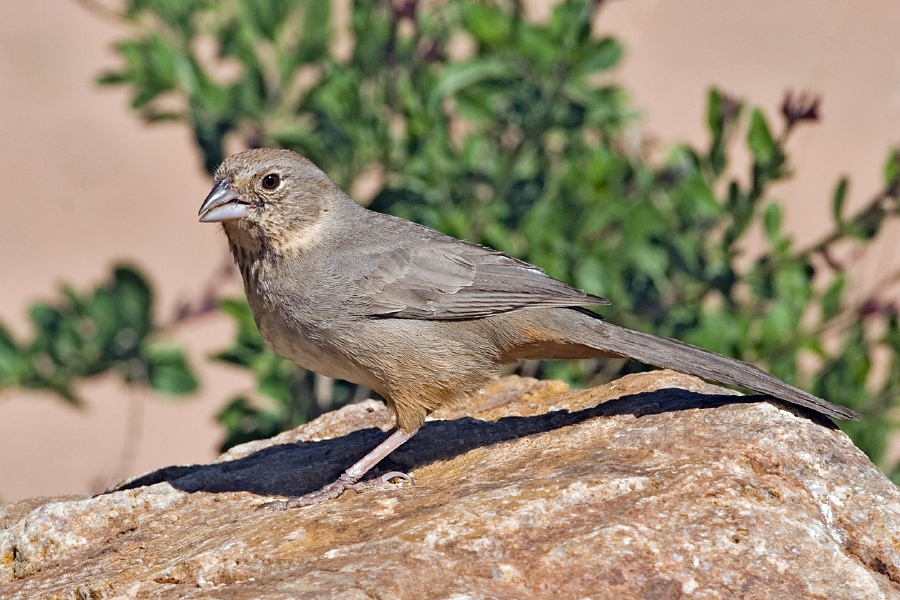
- Canyon towhee (Melozone fusca)

Scientific classification
- Kingdom: Animalia
- Phylum: Chordata
- Class: Aves
- Order: Passeriformes
- Family: Passerellidae
- Genus: Melozone; Reichenbach, 1850

Type species
- Pyrgita biarcuata Prévost & Des Murs, 1846

= Melozone =

Genus of birds

Melozone is a genus of mostly Neotropical birds in the family Passerellidae, found mainly in Mexico. Three species reach as far north as the southwestern United States, two species reach as far south as Costa Rica, and two are endemic to Mexico.

It is one of two genera containing birds with the common name towhee.

== Taxonomy ==
The genus Melozone was introduced in 1850 by the German naturalist Ludwig Reichenbach. The name combines the Ancient Greek μηλον/mēlon meaning "cheek" with ζωνη/zōnē meaning "girdle" or "belt". Reichenbach did not specify a type species but in 1888 the English ornithologist Richard Bowdler Sharpe designated the type as Pyrgita biarcurata Prévost and Des Murs, 1842, Prevost's ground sparrow.

== Species ==
The genus contains following nine species:

Image	Common name	Scientific name	Distribution
	Abert's towhee	Melozone aberti	Arizona, California, Nevada, Utah, New Mexico, and Sonora in Mexico.
	Cabanis's ground sparrow	Melozone cabanisi	Costa Rica.
	California towhee	Melozone crissalis	western Oregon and California in the United States and Baja California Sur in Mexico.
	Canyon towhee	Melozone fusca	Southern Colorado, Arizona, New Mexico & western Texas, also present in northern & central Mexico.
	Prevost's ground sparrow	Melozone biarcuata	southern Mexico to western Honduras.
	Rusty-crowned ground sparrow	Melozone kieneri	western and southwestern Mexico.
	White-eared ground sparrow	Melozone leucotis	Mexico and Guatemala to northern Costa Rica.
	White-throated towhee	Melozone albicollis	Mexico.
