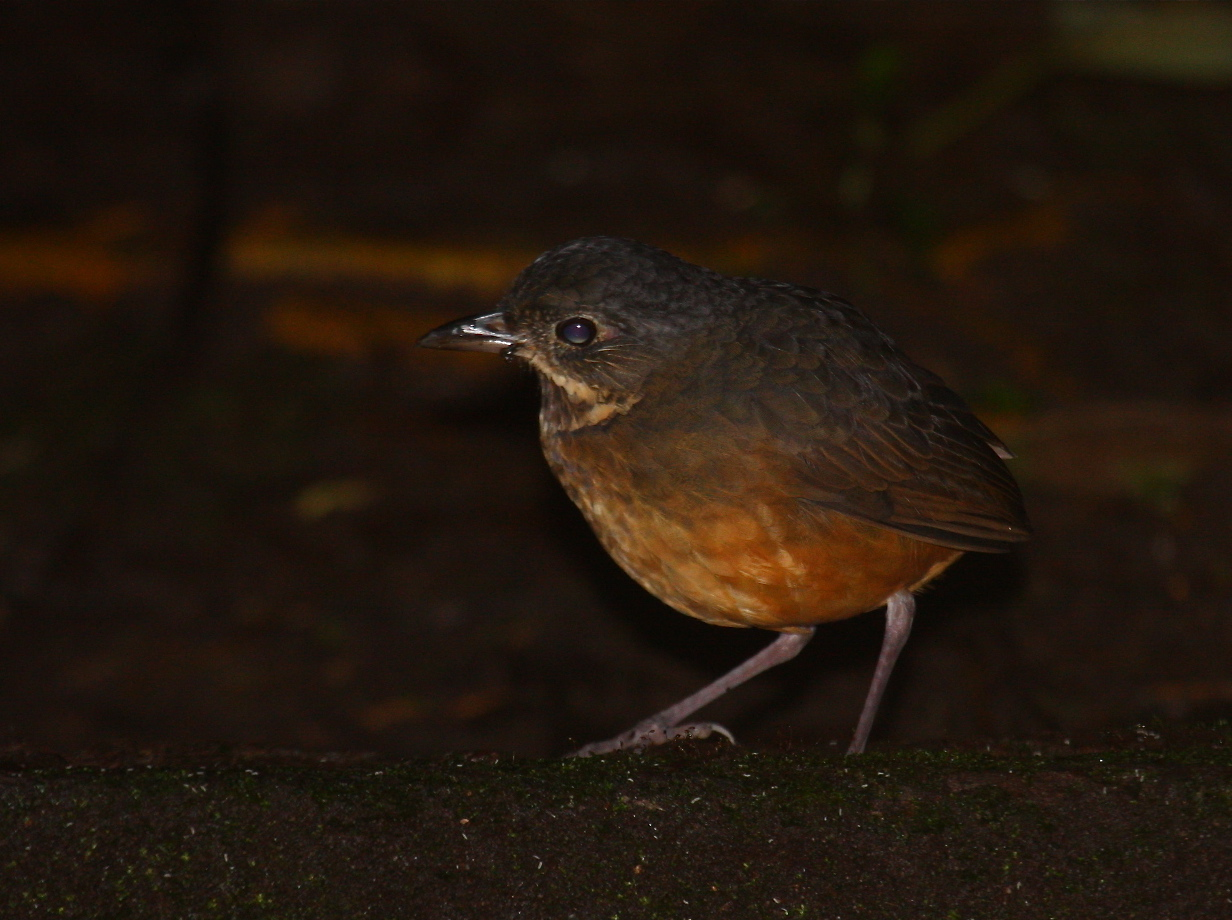

Conservation status
- Least Concern (IUCN 3.1)

Scientific classification
- Kingdom: Animalia
- Phylum: Chordata
- Class: Aves
- Order: Passeriformes
- Family: Grallariidae
- Genus: Grallaria
- Species: G. guatimalensis

Binomial name
- Grallaria guatimalensis Prévost & Des Murs, 1842
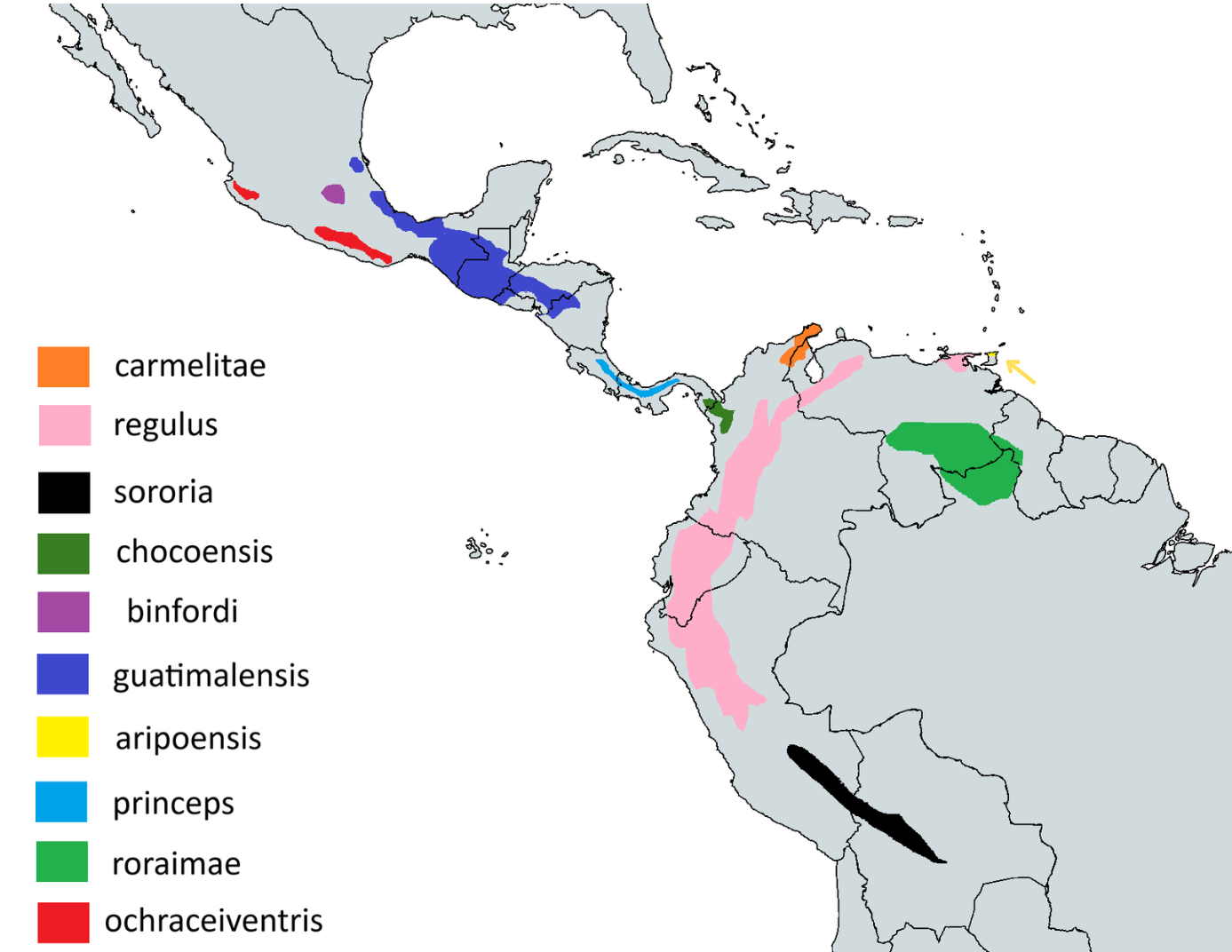

= Scaled antpitta =

Species of bird

The scaled antpitta (Grallaria guatimalensis) is a species of bird in the family Grallariidae. It is found in Bolivia, Brazil, Colombia, Costa Rica, Ecuador, El Salvador, Guatemala, Guyana, Honduras, Mexico, Nicaragua, Panama, Peru, and Venezuela It has occurred as a vagrant on Trinidad. There is also a single record in Belize.

== Taxonomy and systematics ==
The scaled antpitta has these 10 subspecies:

- G. g. binfordi Dickerman, 1990
- G. g. ochraceiventris Nelson, EW, 1898
- G. g. guatimalensis Prévost & Des Murs, 1842
- G. g. princeps Sclater, PL & Salvin, 1869
- G. g. chocoensis Chapman, 1917
- G. g. regulus Sclater, PL, 1860
- G. g. sororia Berlepsch & Stolzmann, 1901
- G. g. carmelitae Todd, 1915
- G. g. aripoensis Hellmayr & Seilern, 1912
- G. g. roraimae Chubb, C, 1921

The scaled antpitta and the moustached antpitta (G. alleni) form a superspecies, and some authors have suggested that they are conspecific.

== Description ==
Grallaria antpittas are a "wonderful group of plump and round antbirds whose feathers are often fluffed up...they have stout bills [and] very short tails". The scaled antpitta is 15 to 19 cm (5.9 to 7.5 in) long and weighs 70 to 98 g (2.5 to 3.5 oz). The sexes have the same plumage. Adults of the nominate subspecies G. g. guatimalensis have a pale olive brownish forecrown with fine black scaling and a gray crown and nape. They have whitish or buffy lores, olive brown ear coverts with thin streaks, and blue-gray skin around their eye. Their back and wing coverts are olive brown with black feather edges that give the eponymous scaled appearance. Their flight feathers and tail are light brown. Their throat is ochraceous- or tawny-brown with thin pale streaks and wide ochraceous or buffy "moustache" streaks on its sides. They often have a black-speckled paler "necklace" below their throat. Their underparts are tawny. All subspecies have a dark brown iris, a black maxilla, a grayish mandible, and pinkish or bluish gray legs and feet.

The other subspecies of the scaled antpitta differ from the nominate and each other thus:

- G. g. binfordi: much paler than the nominate, with narrower scaling on the back
- G. g. ochraceiventris: much paler than the nominate, with narrower scaling on the back
- G. g. princeps: richer colors and heavier scaling on the back than the nominate
- G. g. chocoensis richer colored and darker than the nominate, with rusty lores and an olive cast to the crown and wings
- G. g. regulus: smallest of the subspecies; buffy (not white) "moustache", dusky throat, dark brown breast with pale tawny stripes, and tawny belly and crissum
- G. g. sororia: much like regulus but with a whitish "moustache", a grayer back, and paler underparts
- G. g. carmelitae: darker and browner upperparts than the nominate with brownish cinnamon underparts
- G. g. aripoensis: richer colors overall than the nominate and no "necklace"
- G. g. roraimae: somewhat grayer crown and nape than nominate with paler upperparts, some cinnamon-rufous on the flight feathers, white or ferruginous throat streaks, and paler ferruginous underparts

== Distribution and habitat ==
The scaled antpitta has a highly disjunct distribution. The subspecies are found thus:

- G. g. binfordi: south-central Mexico in Mexico City and Mexico and Morelos states
- G. g. ochraceiventris: southern Mexico between Jalisco and western Hidalgo and from southern Guerrero to southern Oaxaca
- G. g. guatimalensis: from Veracruz and Oaxaca in eastern and southern Mexico south through Guatemala, El Salvador, and Honduras into northern Nicaragua
- G. g. princeps: both slopes in Costa Rica into Panama as far as Veraguas Province
- G. g. chocoensis: Darién Province in eastern Panama and Chocó Department in northwestern Colombia
- G. g. regulus: west slope of Colombia's Eastern Andes; Andes of western Venezuela between Táchira and Lara; southwestern Colombia and south through eastern and western Ecuador to central Peru, where mostly on the east slope
- G. g. sororia: from Peru's Department of Cuzco into central Bolivia's Santa Cruz Department
- G. g. carmelitae: northern Colombia; Sierra Nevada de Santa Marta and from Serranía del Perijá south into northern Boyacá Department
- G. g. aripoensis: Trinidad (but see below)
- G. g. roraimae: tepui area where southern Venezuela, central western Guyana, and northern Brazil meet; population on Margarita Island might be this subspecies

A single scaled antpitta was captured in a mist net in Belize in 2024. The South American Classification Committee of the American Ornithological Society lists the scaled antpitta as vagrant on Trinidad.

The scaled antpitta inhabits a variety of landscapes in the upper tropical and lower temperate zones. These include humid evergreen forest, lowland rainforest, and pine-oak forest. It is almost always on the forest floor and usually favors areas with dense vegetation. In northern Central America it is found in humid semi-deciduous forest, pine-oak forest, and cloudforest. In Costa Rica it is found in wet montane forest. In elevation it generally occurs between 500 and 3,000 m (1,600 and 9,800 ft) in Mexico and Central America but only 800 to 1,600 m (2,600 to 5,200 ft) in Costa Rica. It is found below 1,900 m (6,200 ft) in Colombia, between 350 and 2,400 m (1,100 and 7,900 ft) in Venezuela, mostly below 1,300 m (4,300 ft) but as high as 2,000 m (6,600 ft) in Ecuador, and between 650 and 1,750 m (2,100 and 5,700 ft) in Peru.

== Behavior ==
=== Movement ===
The scaled antpitta is resident throughout its range except perhaps on Trinidad and in Belize.

=== Feeding ===
The scaled antpitta is one of several antpittas that regularly come to feeding stations set up to allow viewing them. There they are fed earthworms and similar invertebrates, which are thought to also be a large part of their natural diet. In the wild they are known to feed on a variety of arthropods and possibly also on small vertebrates like frogs. They are highly terrestrial while foraging; they hop, pause, and dash to capture prey, sometimes flicking aside and probing leaf litter to expose it. They seldom fly beyond a short distance or higher than to a low branch. They mostly hunt at dawn and dusk. They probably attend army ant swarms to capture prey disturbed by the ants.

=== Breeding ===
The scaled antpitta's breeding season varies geographically. Its nest is a bulky open cup of dead plant material like sticks, leaves, grasses, and sometimes moss, and is lined with thin materials like pine needles, rootlets, and fungal rhizomorphs. They are typically placed within about 1.5 m (5 ft) of the ground on a stump, fallen log, or overlapping branches. The usual clutch is two sky-blue to blue-green eggs. The incubation period is about 19 days and fledging occurs 17 to 19 days after hatch. Both parents incubate the clutch and care for nestlings.

=== Vocalization ===
The song of most subspecies of scaled antpitta is "a rapid series of quavering, hollow notes lasting 2-7 seconds, slowly increasing in volume and pitch and then quickly becoming quieter at the end: cau, cau, cau-cau-caucaucaucau, cau". That of subspecies G. g. sororia is "a slower-paced (6 notes/sec maximum) series of hooted notes that accelerates-decelerates at the loudest and highest-pitched notes, then accelerates again slightly: poo-poo-pu-pu'pu'pu-pu-POO-POO-POO-pu'pu". That of G. g. roraimae also differs somewhat, being "a long series of low hooting notes with three longer, more emphatic notes in the middle".

== Status ==
The IUCN has assessed the scaled antpitta as being of Least Concern. It has a very large range; its estimated population of at least 50,000 mature individuals is believed to be decreasing. No immediate threats have been identified. It is considered threatened in Mexico and El Salvador due to habitat modification. It is considered rare to uncommon throughout northern Central America, rare in Costa Rica, "uncommon and patchily distributed" in Colombia, "spotty and local" in Venezuela, "under little threat in Ecuador", and "rare to uncommon" in Peru.
