= Towhee =

Common name for a type of small bird

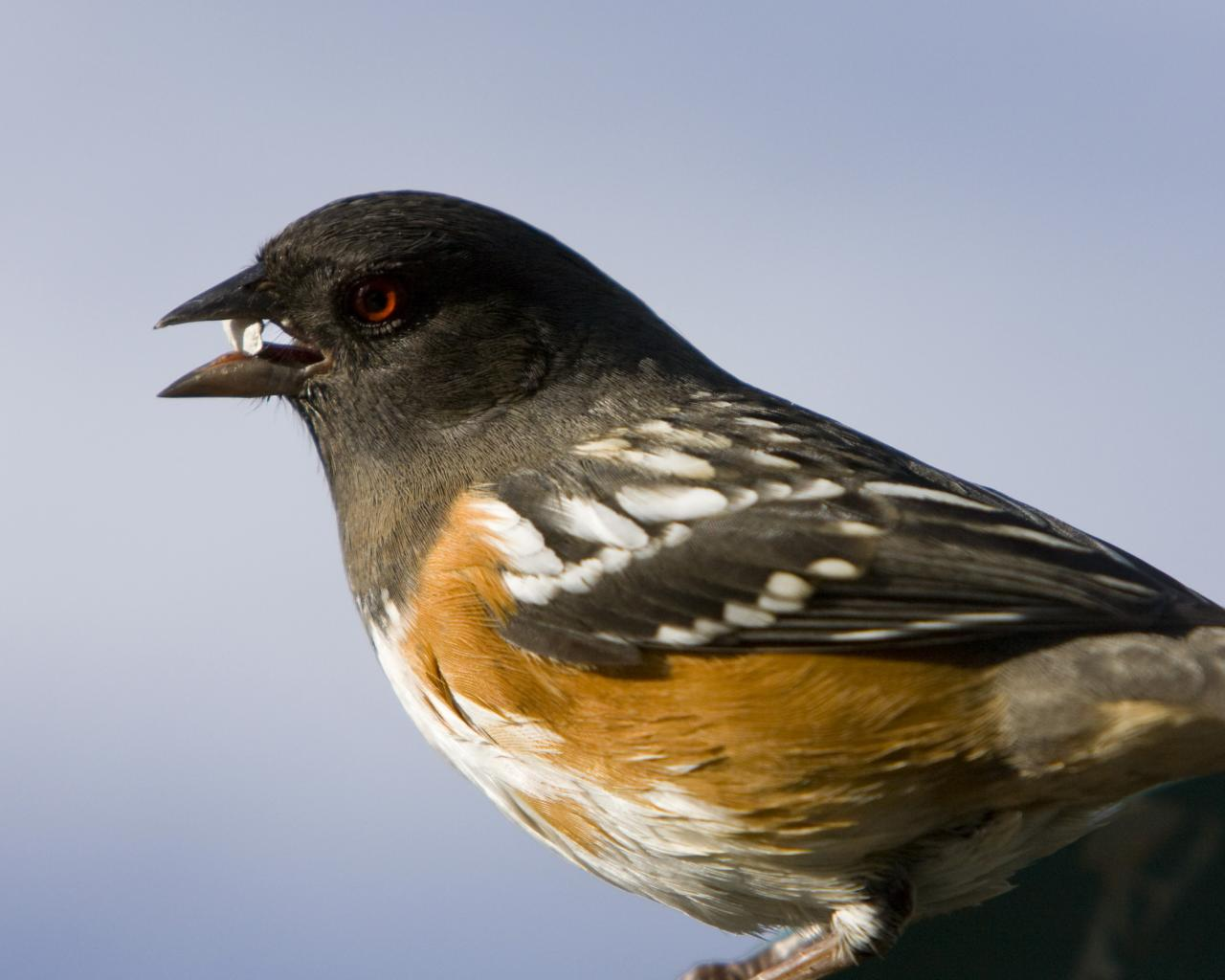
Spotted towhee (Pipilo maculatus)

A towhee is any one of a number of species of birds in the genus Pipilo or Melozone within the family Passerellidae (which also includes American sparrows and juncos).

Towhees typically have longer tails than other Passerellidae. Most species tend to avoid humans, so they are not well-known, though the eastern towhee P. erythrophthalmus is bolder. This species, and some others, may be seen in urban parks and gardens.

There has been considerable debate over the taxonomy of towhees. Two species complexes have been identified, the rufous-sided complex (involving Pipilo erythrophthalmus, P. maculatus, P. socorroensis, P. ocai and P. chlorurus), and the brown towhee complex (involving Melozone crissalis, M. fusca, M. aberti and M. albicollis). The distinction of species within these is uncertain and opinions have differed over the years. Modern authorities distinguish all four species in the brown towhee complex, though M. fusca and M. crissalis were formerly treated as a single species. Hybrids are frequent between some of the species, particularly between the Mexican races of P. maculatus ("olive-backed towhee", P. m. macronyx) and P. ocai.

Genus Melozone:

- Abert's towhee (Melozone aberti)
- California towhee (Melozone crissalis),
- Canyon towhee (Melozone fusca)
- White-throated towhee (Melozone albicollis)

Genus Pipilo:

- Green-tailed towhee (Pipilo chlorurus),
- Collared towhee (Pipilo ocai),
- Eastern towhee (Pipilo erythrophthalmus),
- Spotted towhee (Pipilo maculatus),
- Bermuda towhee (Pipilo naufragus) — extinct
