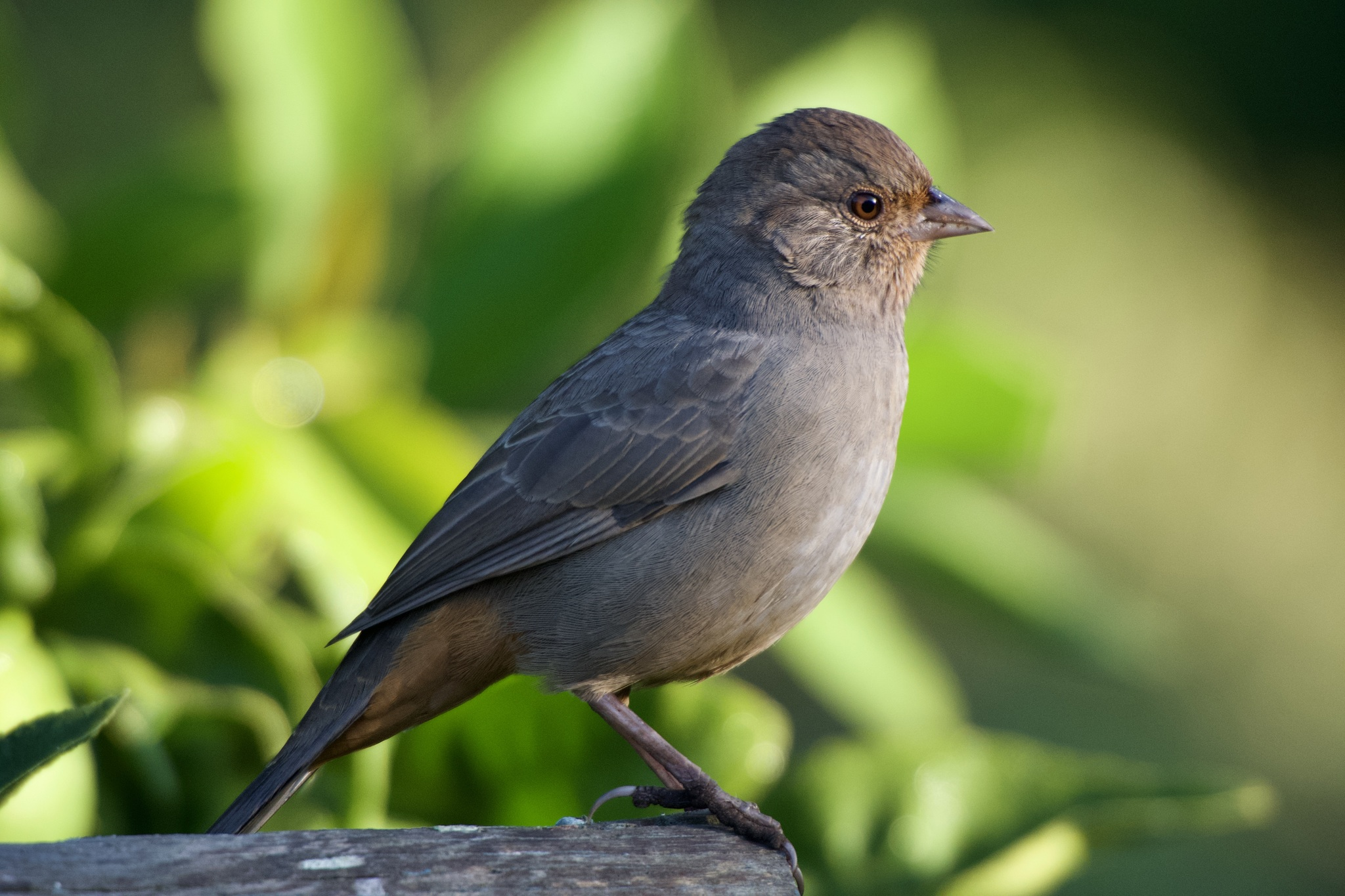

Conservation status
- Least Concern (IUCN 3.1)

- Apparently Secure (NatureServe)

Scientific classification
- Kingdom: Animalia
- Phylum: Chordata
- Class: Aves
- Order: Passeriformes
- Family: Passerellidae
- Genus: Melozone
- Species: M. crissalis

Binomial name
- Melozone crissalis (Vigors, 1839)

Synonyms
- Pipilo crissalis Pyrgisoma crissale

= California towhee =

Species of bird

The California towhee (Melozone crissalis) is a bird of the family Passerellidae, native to the coastal regions of western Oregon and California in the United States and Baja California and Baja California Sur in Mexico.

The taxonomy of this species has been debated. At the higher level, some authors place the towhees in the family Fringillidae. Within the group, there has been debate about whether the distinction between this species and the similar canyon towhee (Melozone fuscus) should be at the specific or subspecific level. The two species used to be grouped together as the brown towhee, yet today they are identified separately, especially because of their differing feather coloration, and the canyon towhee's dark central breast spot. The two populations are quite isolated from each other, and molecular genetics seems to have settled the matter in favor of two distinct species for the present. On the other hand, there seems to be little distinction between the northern and Baja Californian populations within M. crissalis. Nowadays, scientists consider the Abert's towhee as the California towhee's closest relative due to closely aligned DNA and patterns.

== Taxonomy ==
Some authorities use Pipilo crissalis or Pyrgisoma crissale to refer to the California towhee, although the most widely regarded classification is Melozone crissalis. The difference arises between the distinct classifications the bird has due to its close proximity to other Passerellidae.

== Etymology ==
The classification of this bird follows the quinarian system popularized in the early 19th century to better identify birds. The term Melozone crissalis was developed by Nicholas Vigors in 1839, an Irish politician and zoologist who popularized the quinarian system around the world.

== Appearance ==
The California towhee's coloring is dull brown overall with light rust undertail covert feathers and buff or rust-colored streaks at the throat. There is little sexual dimorphism.

California towhees have the short, rounded wings of a sparrow, as well as a long tail and a thick beak which is used for cracking seeds. However, the towhees are larger and bulkier than sparrows. Both sexes of towhee generally grow to be 8.3–9.8 in (21–25 cm) in length, with a wingspan of about 11.4 in (29 cm). They weigh 1.3–2.4 oz (37–68 g). The California towhee's color pattern is matte brown all around, barring a rusty patch beneath its tail and around its bill. This is true of both females and males.

It is around 20–25 cm (7.9–9.8 in) in length, and has a noticeably long tail of 8.2 to 11.6 cm (3.2 to 4.6 in). Its appearance suggests a large, plain sparrow. Males weigh from 48.6–61.2 g (1 3/4–2 1/8 oz), with an average of 53.9 g (1 7/8 oz), while females weigh from 46.3–61.2 g (1 5/8–2 1/8 oz), with an average of 51.8 g (1 7/8 oz). Among standard measurements, the wing chord is 7.9 to 10.4 cm (3.1 to 4.1 in), the bill is 1.3 to 1.6 cm (0.51 to 0.63 in) and the tarsus is 2.3 to 2.8 cm (0.91 to 1.10 in).

== Distribution and habitat ==
This bird's natural habitat is California's brush, chaparral, open woodlands, and along streams adjacent to desert slopes. It has widely adapted to parks and gardens and is found throughout Baja California, as well. They can be found along the North Pacific coastline from Southern Oregon, USA to Baja California, Mexico. The California towhee is a non-migratory bird and they only change their homes when finding a mate.

As these birds are of Least Concern in their natural habitats, they do not face any imminent threats to their livelihood. According to the National Audubon Society, the three biggest threats to the California towhee are fire weather, spring heat waves, and urbanization. Fire weather may affect this towhee because they tend to hide in shrubbery. If these birds are found in a very densely forested area during a wildfire, they would definitely be under threat, but due to their reproductive patterns, their general population would remain largely unaffected. Spring heat waves affect populations by increasing the temperature, decreasing the supply of water and other resources, and can affect food chains. This would affect the California towhee, but once again, not enough for the entire population to move into the Not Threatened bracket. Urbanization may seem like the greatest threat to all species, however, this bird species has adapted well to living among and near people.

Currently, the California towhee's range will not decrease or increase, however, if global warming continues at the same or a more rapid pace, their range and population may be greatly reduced. If the temperature of their range increases between 1.5 and 3 °C (34.7 and 37.4 °F) during the summertime, they would gain at least a 2% range in available habitat, yet that still means they would have to migrate upwards. If the temperature of their range increases between 1.5 and 3 °C (34.7 and 37.4 °F) during the winter, they would lose at least 20% of their range and at most 77% of their range. This highlights the fragility of the balance of their ecosystems, especially considering that they are not migratory birds.

Aside from the wild habitat they traditionally live in, they also find comfort among rural and suburban area. This shows they are either reluctant to give up their given range or that they enjoy a greater quality of life within less densely populated human settlements.

== Behavior and ecology ==
The California towhee feeds on the ground or in low scrub where it prefers a variety of seeds, grasses, and herbs. When eating grass seeds, towhees can strip all seeds off at once using its beak. During breeding season, the California towhee supplements its diet with insects such as grasshoppers and beetles. Additionally, they may eat snails, millipedes, and spiders. It is most often seen traveling or feeding singly or in pairs. It is very active on the ground. The California towhee uses a "double-scratch" maneuver when foraging, looking beneath leaves by lunging forward and hopping backwards, using its feet to scratch the ground and reveal food. Additionally, it visits feeders, often eating the millet that other birds disdain. Able to run rapidly for short distances, it keeps in constant contact with its mate—perhaps forming lifelong pairs.

While the towhee is seen drinking freely in the wild and in captivity, in drier habitats their water needs may be met mostly via feeding on insects and succulent foods.

The call consists of a single-note sound that different people hear as seet, tseek, tsip, cheet, cheenk or peenk and the song consists of a long repeating series ended with a trill.

=== Nesting ===
Nests are typically found in low branches or shrubs about 0.5 to 4 m (1 ft 8 in to 13 ft 1 in) above ground. The nest is a bulky cup made of twigs, stems, grasses, and hair, and is constructed by female towhees.

The female incubates the nest of 2 to 4 eggs alone for 11–14 days. Eggs are laid from March through September with shells that are slightly glossy and pale bluish white with some brownish flecks concentrated mostly on the larger end. At the time of hatching, the young have sparse down feathers. Young leave the nest after 6–11 days.

The California towhee breeding season lasts from early April to early August, peaking in late May or early June. Towhees may raise 2–3 broods each year.

== Conservation ==
Within the half century of 1966–2015, the population of the California towhee was stable, with a slight decline in population due to increased temperatures and urbanization. The organization, Partners in Flight estimates that 61% of actively breeding California towhees live in the United States, while the remainder live in Baja California, Mexico. This bird has a global breeding population of around nine million birds spread across this range, making them a minimally threatened species. While the species in general is not under threat, a sub-species (M. c. eremophilus) of the California towhee in the Inyo mountains of Eastern California was previously down to around 175 breeding birds in the early 1980s. They had been mostly displaced by increasing agricultural projects and destruction of habitat to accommodate these projects.

Because the California towhee is generally known to be a less threatened bird, these Inyo California towhees were not receiving the conservation efforts to be able to sustainably recover their populations and recover lost habitats. If trends had continued, they might have required to have been repopulated by local wildlife sources, however, in 2001 the Bureau of Land Management enacted a reform to reduce mining, livestock agriculture, and general habitat displacement practices which has helped aid this subspecies to over 700 living birds today. Although significant progress has been made, they still must be protected against human interventions and feral burros.

== Relationship with humans ==
California towhees have adapted to human presence in California. As suburbs and cities were developed in the state, towhees have moved into parks in lowland towns, as well as backyards with appropriate shrubbery. Consequently, they are found eating garden produce, such as apricots, plums, and peas.

Because they are ground foragers, California towhees are more likely to be attracted by feed spread on the ground than in hanging feeders.

== Gallery ==
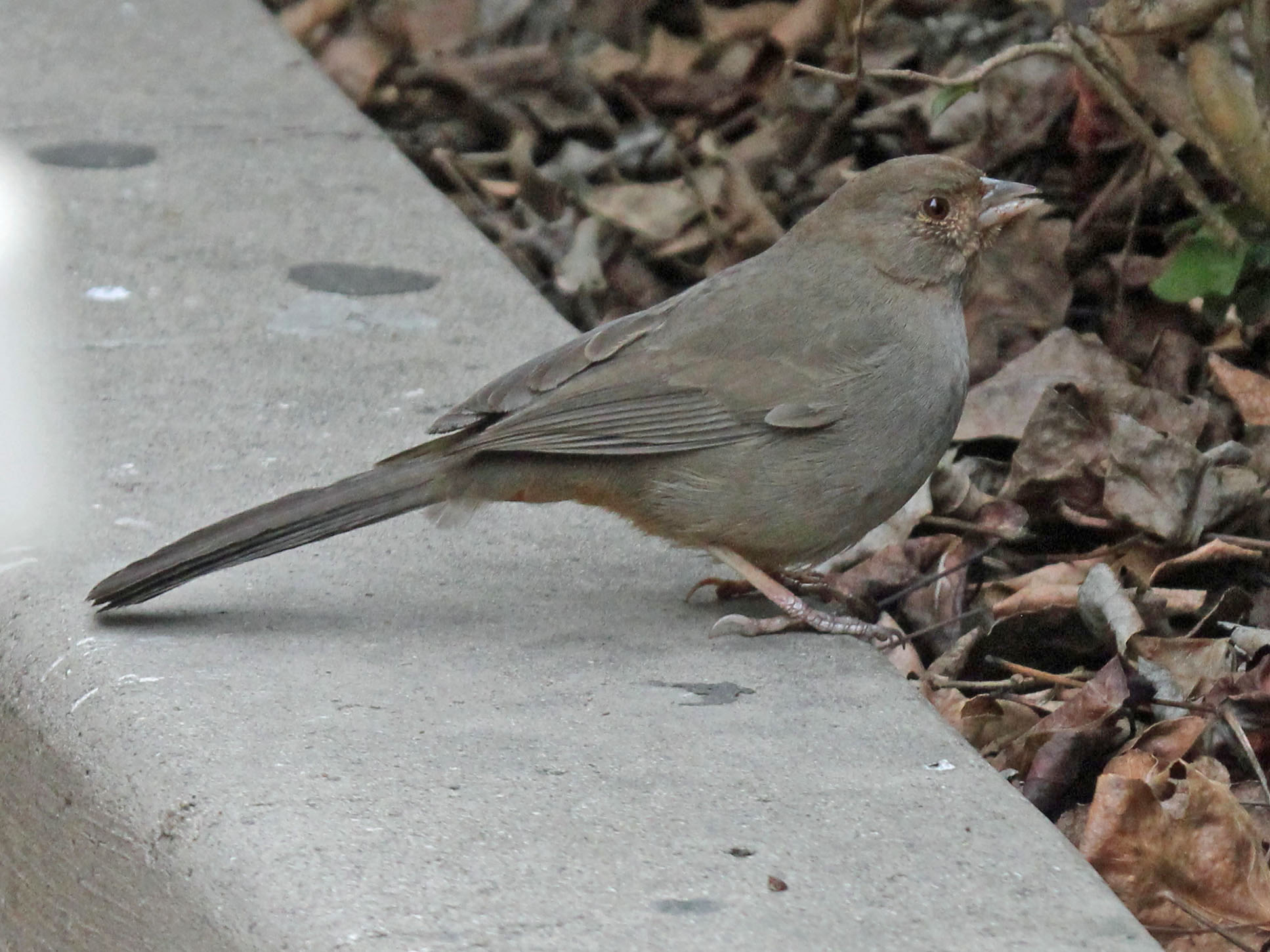
In San Diego, California

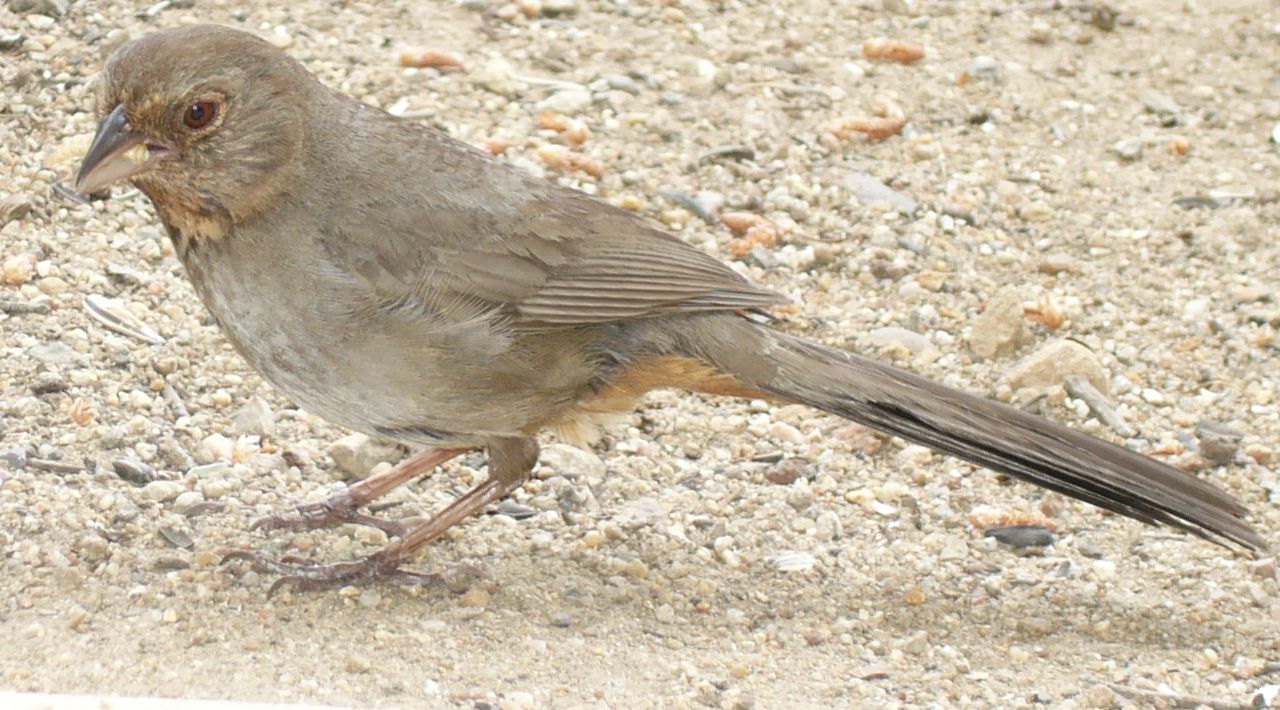
Female with insect in beak for chicks

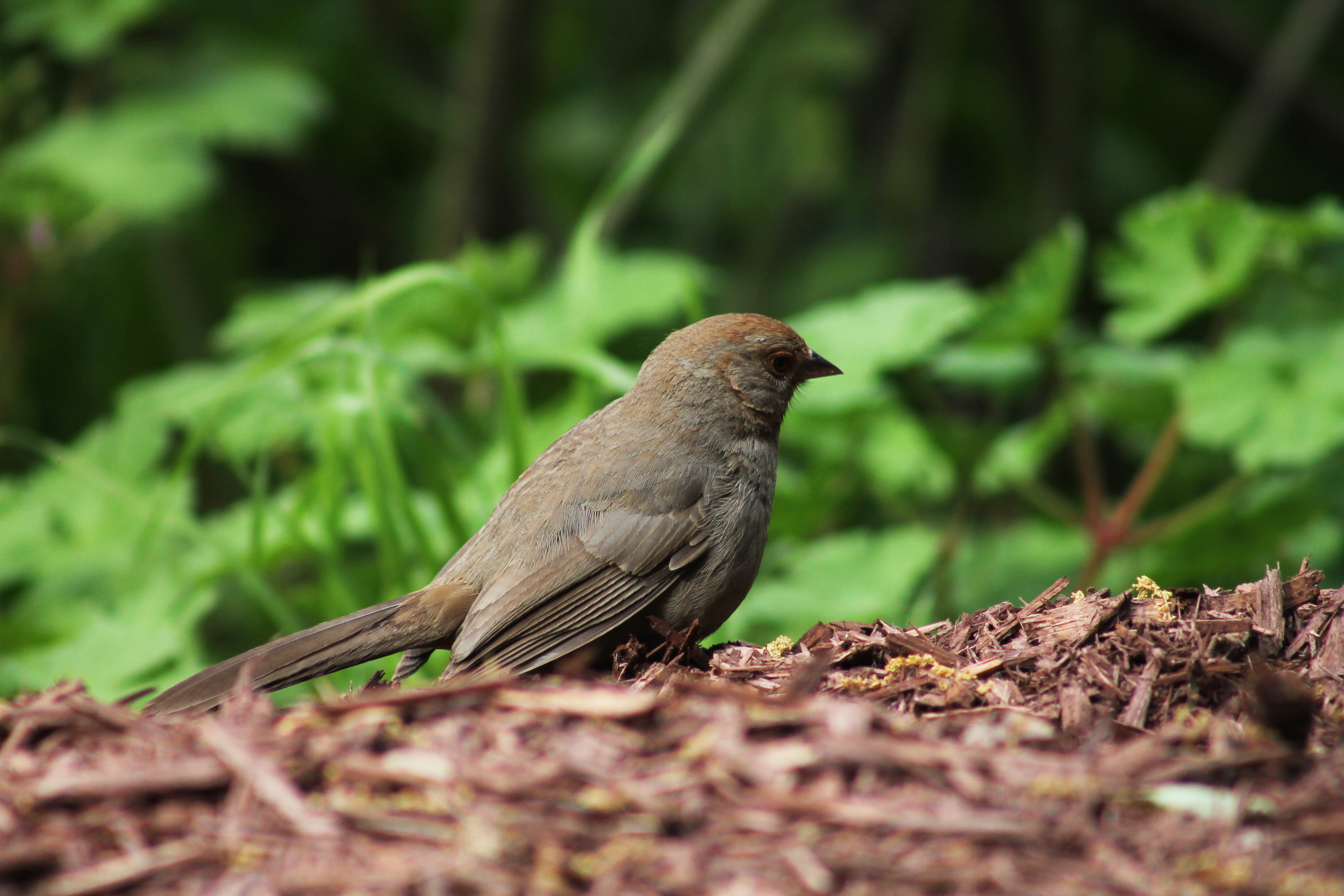
California towhee at Morcom Rose Garden in Oakland, California

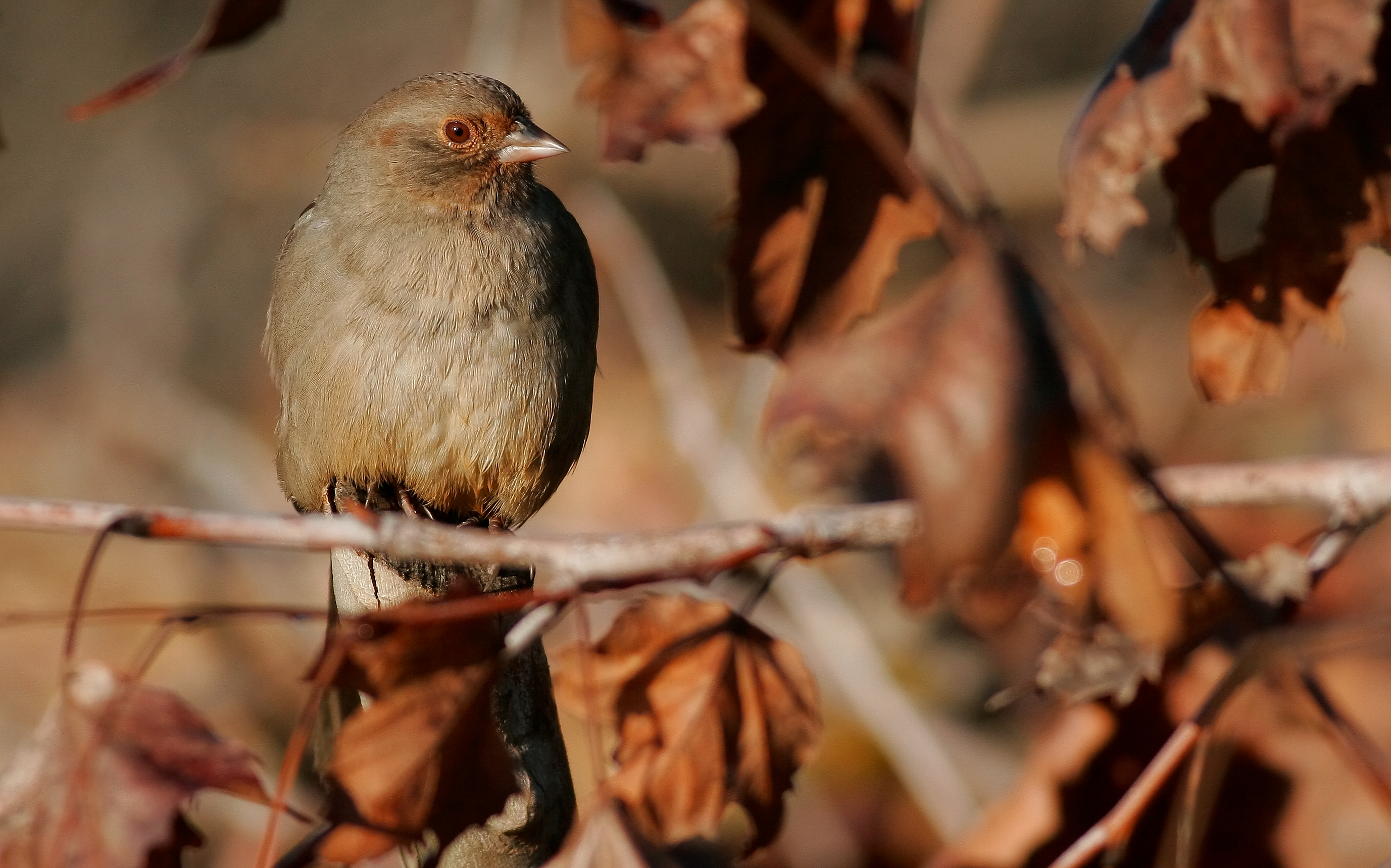
In Sacramento, California

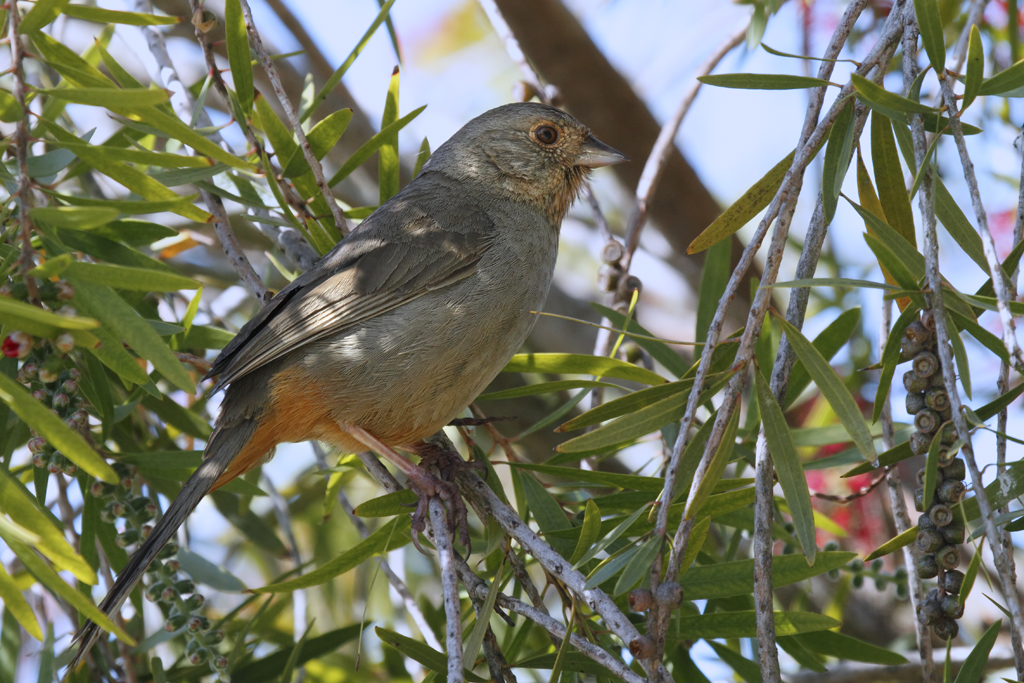
In California
