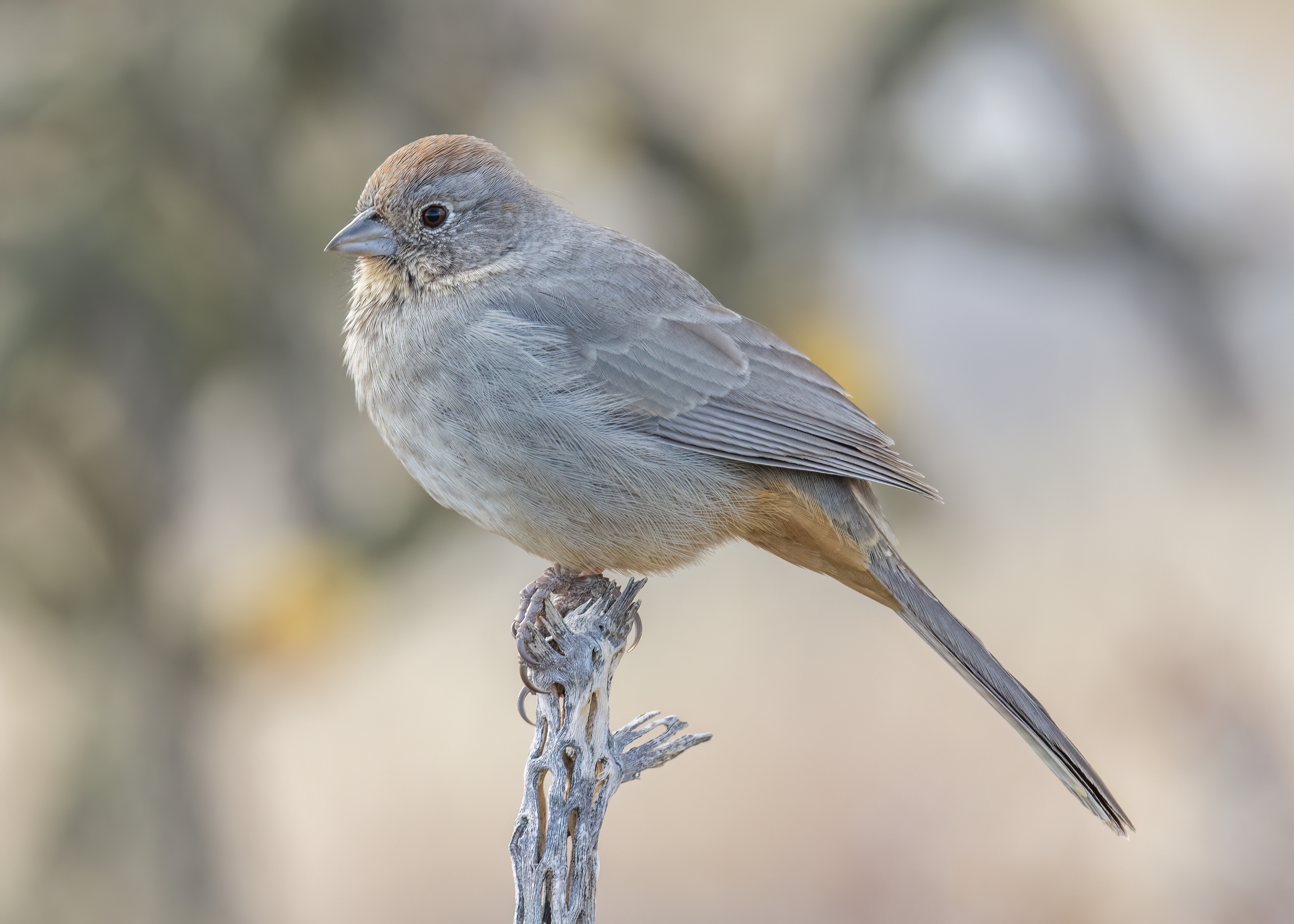

Conservation status
- Least Concern (IUCN 3.1)

Scientific classification
- Kingdom: Animalia
- Phylum: Chordata
- Class: Aves
- Order: Passeriformes
- Family: Passerellidae
- Genus: Melozone
- Species: M. fusca

Binomial name
- Melozone fusca (Swainson, 1827)

Synonyms
- Melozone fuscus *Pipilo fuscus

= Canyon towhee =

Species of bird

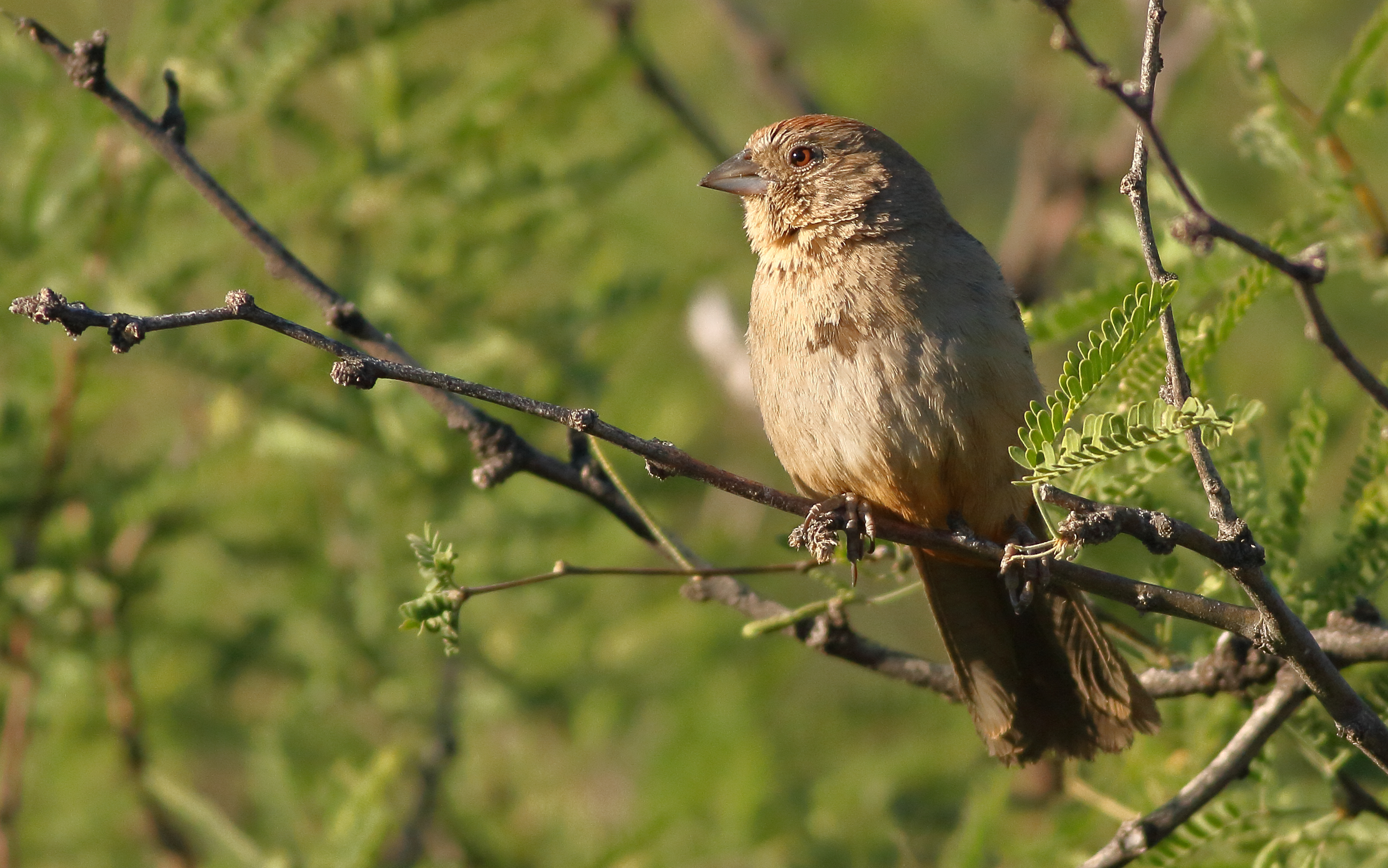
Canyon towhee in Cochise County, Arizona

The canyon towhee (Melozone fusca) is a bird of the family Passerellidae. Until 1989, the canyon towhee and the California towhee were considered to be a single species which was called the brown towhee.

== Taxonomy ==
The taxonomy of the group of towhees to which this species belongs is debated. At the higher level, some authors place the towhees in the family Fringillidae. Within the genus, there has been dispute about whether the canyon towhee is a distinct species from the California towhee (Melozone crissalis) found in coastal regions from Oregon and California in the United States through Baja California in Mexico. At present, molecular genetics seems to have settled this issue in favour of separation of the species.

== Description ==
It is 19 to 25 cm (7.5 to 9.8 in) long, and has a noticeably long tail, at 8.2 to 11 cm (3.2 to 4.3 in). This species weighs from 36.5 to 67 g (1 1/4 to 2 1/4 oz), though on average weigh only around 45 g (1 1/2 oz). Among standard measurements, the wing chord is 8.2 to 10.1 cm (3.2 to 4.0 in), the bill is 1.4 to 1.7 cm (0.55 to 0.67 in) and the tarsus is 2.3 to 2.7 cm (0.91 to 1.06 in). It is earthy brown in color, with somewhat lighter underparts and a somewhat darker head with a rufous cap (except that birds in central Mexico have the cap the same color as the back); there is also a slightly reddish area beneath the tail. There is little sexual dimorphism.

== Distribution and habitat ==
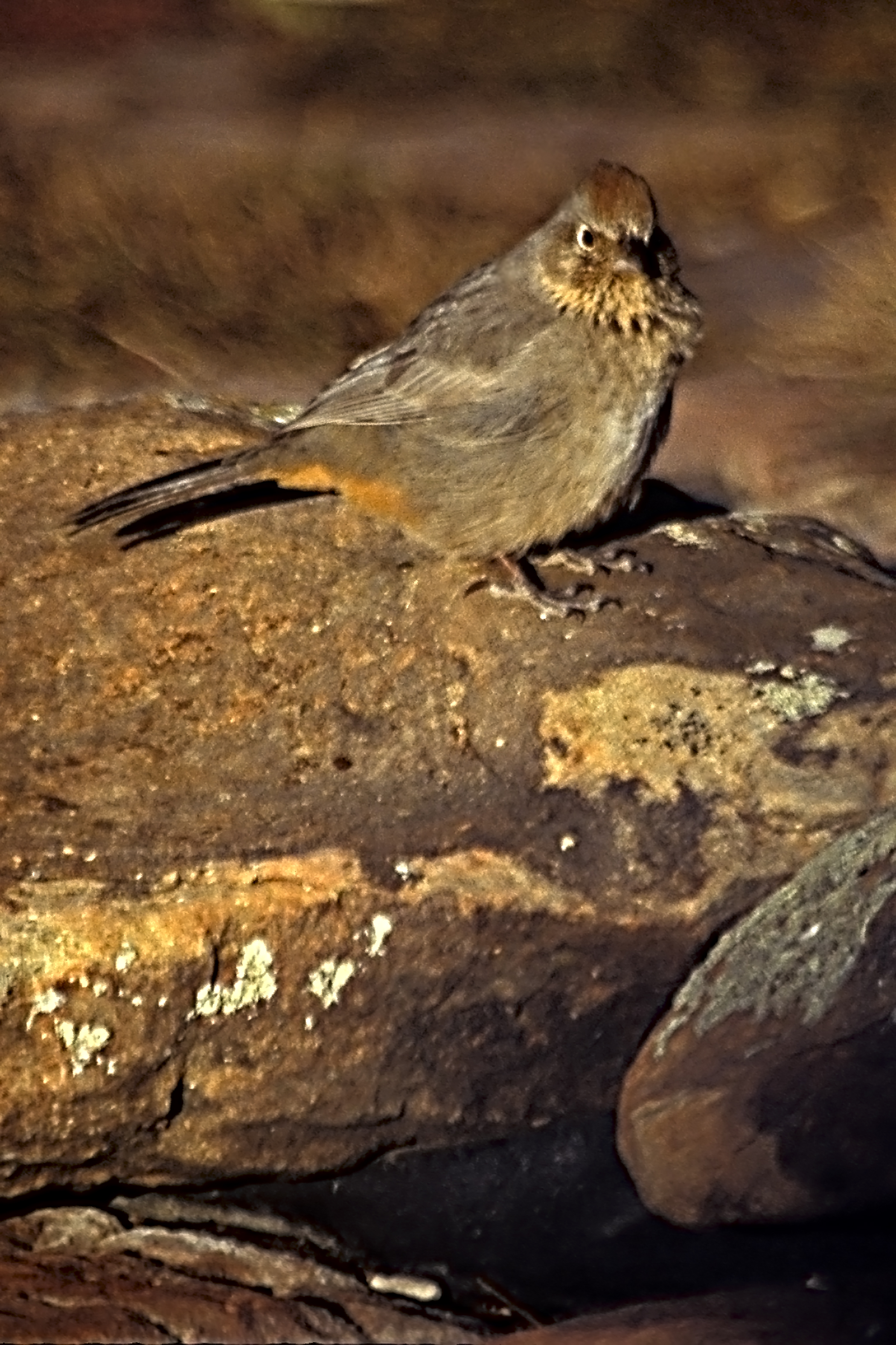
Notice the natural camouflage.

The towhee is native to lower-lying areas from Arizona, southern Colorado, New Mexico and western Texas south to northwestern Oaxaca, Mexico, mostly avoiding the coasts. Its natural habitat is brush or chaparral.

== Behavior ==
The towhee feeds on the ground or in low scrub rather than in the tree canopy. Near human habitation, it is often seen in parking lots, where it feeds on insects on the cars' grilles and takes cover under the cars when disturbed.
