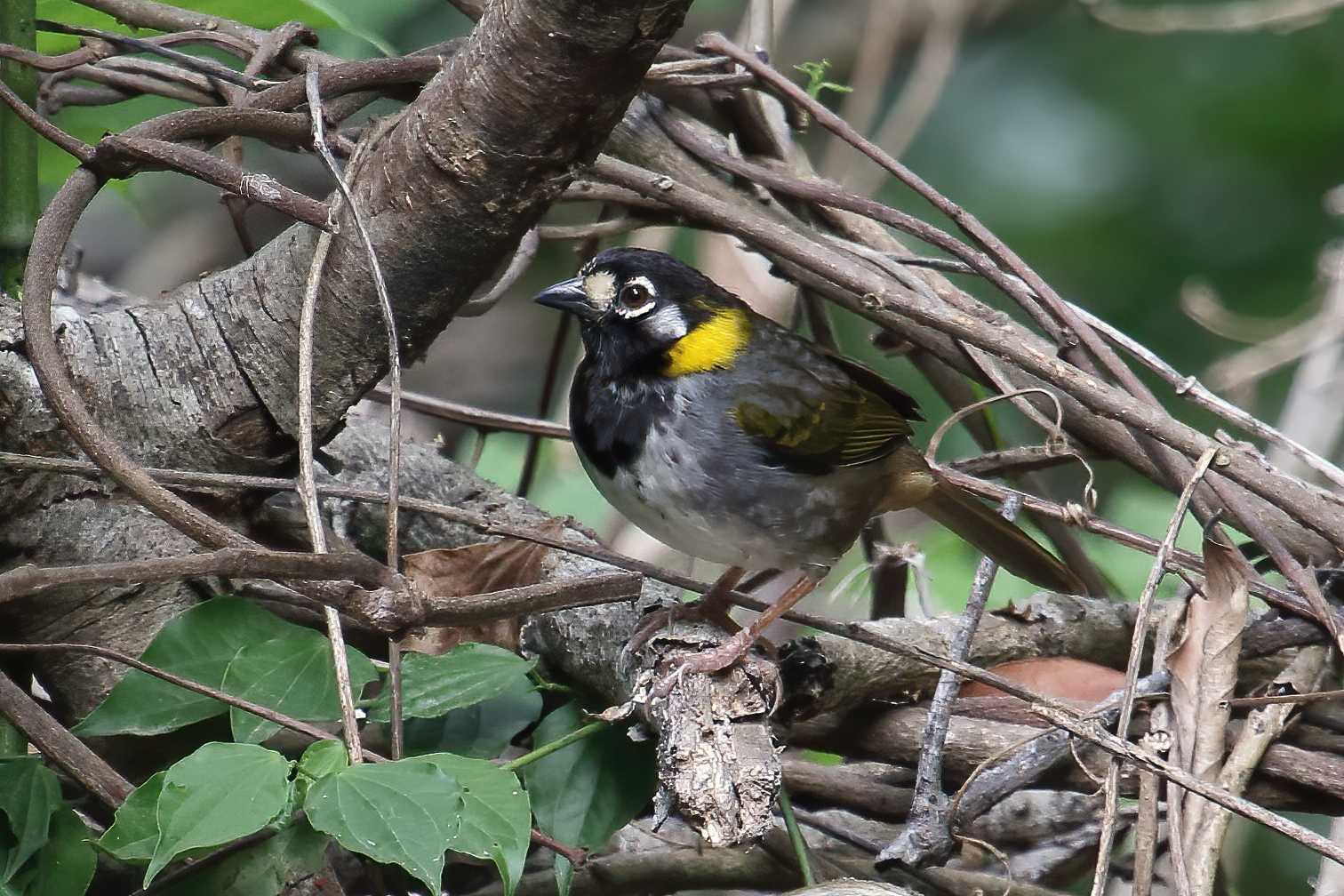

Conservation status
- Least Concern (IUCN 3.1)

Scientific classification
- Kingdom: Animalia
- Phylum: Chordata
- Class: Aves
- Order: Passeriformes
- Family: Passerellidae
- Genus: Melozone
- Species: M. leucotis

Binomial name
- Melozone leucotis Cabanis, 1861
- Ranges of the white-eared and grey-crowned ground sparrows (see the taxonomy and distribution sections)

= White-eared ground sparrow =

Species of bird

The white-eared ground sparrow (Melozone leucotis) is a species of bird in the family Passerellidae, the New World sparrows. It is found in Costa Rica, Honduras, and Nicaragua.

== Taxonomy and systematics ==
The white-eared ground sparrow was formally described in 1861 with its present binomial Melozone leucotis.

The white-eared ground sparrow long was assigned three subspecies, the nominate M. l. leucotis (Cabanis, 1861), M. l. nigrior (Miller, W & Griscom, 1925), and M. l. occipitalis (Salvin, 1878). The last had originally been described as a species, and following two 2017 studies most taxonomic systems again recognized it as one, the grey-crowned ground sparrow, though some did not do so until 2025. However, in both 2018 and 2023 the American Ornithological Society declined to make the change, and as of 2025 AviList intends to revisit the issue.

This article follows the two-subspecies model.

== Description ==
The white-eared ground sparrow is about 18 cm (7.1 in) long and weighs about 42 g (1.5 oz). The sexes have the same plumage. Adults of the nominate subspecies have a mostly black head with white patches in front of the eye and on the ear coverts, a broken white eye-ring, a large yellow patch behind the ear coverts and on the sides of the neck, and a thin yellow line above the last. Their mantle is gray-brown and the rest of their upperparts, wings, and tail are olive-green. Their throat is black and a large black patch in the center of the breast sometimes connects to it. The sides of their breast and flanks are gray to white, their belly whitish, and their undertail coverts reddish to buffy. Subspecies M. l. nigrior is very similar to the nominate but has a larger black area on the breast that almost always is an extension of the black throat. Both sexes of both subspecies have a dark red-brown iris, a blackish bill, and pinkish legs and feet. Juveniles have a much less distinct facial pattern than adults. Their back is dark gray to brown with reddish tips on the feathers and their breast is grayish or brownish with wide black streaks. They have a gray-brown iris, a dark yellowish bill, and pinkish gray to pinkish brown legs and feet.

== Distribution and habitat ==
The white-eared ground sparrow has a disjunct distribution. Subspecies M. l. nigrior is the more northerly of the two. It is found in east-central Honduras and separately in north-central Nicaragua. The nominate is found in Costa Rica's Central Valley from far northeastern Puntarenas and western Alajuela provinces south to central San José Province. The species inhabits a variety of somewhat open landscapes including many that are human-modified. They include riparian forest, the edges of more extensive forest, coffee plantations, agricultural areas, and thickets in urban areas. Overall it ranges in elevation between 500 and 2,000 m (1,600 and 6,600 ft) but between 1,000 and 2,000 m (3,300 and 6,600 ft) in Costa Rica.

== Behavior ==
=== Movement ===
Though the white-eared ground sparrow is not a migrant, apparently males are sedentary and females often change territories from year to year.

=== Feeding ===
The white-eared ground sparrow feeds on small seeds, fruits, insects, and other arthropods. It has been observed feeding on other plant material and on waste or discarded human food like rice and crumbs. It forages in pairs and small family groups. It forages mostly on the ground, where between hops it moves leaf litter by kicking backwards with both feet simultaneously. It also feeds in shrubs and trees up to about 5 m (15 ft) above the ground.

=== Breeding ===
The white-eared ground sparrow breeds between March and September in Costa Rica with most activity in April and May. The usual nest is a cup loosely woven from plant fibers with a more tightly woven lining. These are placed on the ground or in vegetation up to about 2 m (7 ft) above the ground. Another nest type is a platform of plant fibers on the ground. The clutch is two or three eggs that are white with dark brown spots. The female alone incubates, for about 12 days. The time to fledging is not known. Both parents provision nestlings. The bronzed cowbird (Molthrus aeneus) is a common nest parasite.

=== Vocalization ===
In Costa Rica the male white-eared ground sparrow's song "begins slowly, then quickly accelerates into a profusion of loud, high notes". They usually have a repertoire of up to eight song variations. Pairs sometimes sing in duet. Both sexes make chip and seet calls. Males sing solo only during the breeding season; duets and calls are made year-round. Males sing from a perch and mostly soon after dawn.

== Status ==
The IUCN has assessed the white-eared ground sparrow as being of Least Concern. Its population size is not known and is believed to be decreasing. No immediate threats have been identified. It is considered "uncommon and local" in Honduras and "fairly common" in Costa Rica. "The White-eared Ground-Sparrow has a broad distribution, but its habitat is being reduced and fragmented by urban development. As a result, populations are declining, and inbreeding has increased within isolated urban populations over time."
