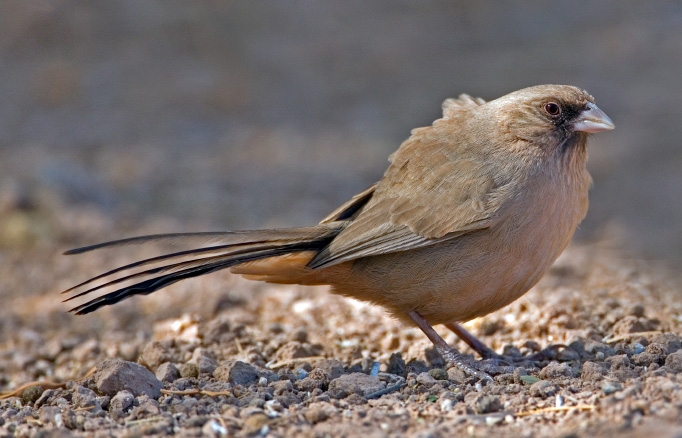

Conservation status
- Least Concern (IUCN 3.1)

Scientific classification
- Kingdom: Animalia
- Phylum: Chordata
- Class: Aves
- Order: Passeriformes
- Family: Passerellidae
- Genus: Melozone
- Species: M. aberti

Binomial name
- Melozone aberti (Baird, 1852)

Synonyms
- Pipilo aberti Pyrgisoma aberti

= Abert's towhee =

Species of bird

Abert's towhee (Melozone aberti) is a bird of the family Passerellidae, native to a small range in southwestern North America, generally the lower Colorado River and Gila River watersheds, nearly endemic to Arizona, but also present in small parts of California, Nevada, Utah, New Mexico, and Sonora in Mexico. The name of this bird commemorates the American ornithologist James William Abert (1820–1897).

== More Information ==
Abert's towhees are recognized by their relatively long tails, dark faces, and overall brown plumage. They are related to sparrows and juncos but are more similar to thrashers in appearance. They may be confused with the California towhee, but their dark faces are more distinct, and the range of these species only slightly overlaps. The Abert's towhee is the longest species in the diverse New World sparrow family at 21 to 25 cm (8.3 to 9.8 in) long, but its length is boosted by a relatively long tail, at 10 to 12 cm (3.9 to 4.7 in) in length. Males weigh from 40–54.1 g (1.41–1.91 oz), with an average of 47.1 g (1.66 oz), while females weigh from 39.5–51 g (1.39–1.80 oz), with an average of 44.8 g (1.58 oz). In terms of weight, it is outweighed by several other towhee species. Among standard measurements, the wing chord is 8.2 to 9.7 cm (3.2 to 3.8 in), the bill is 1.5 to 1.6 cm (0.59 to 0.63 in) and the tarsus is 2.6 to 2.9 cm (1.0 to 1.1 in).

== Habitat ==
This bird is common in brushy riparian habitats in the Lower Sonoran desert zone and prefers to stay well-hidden under bushes. Though threatened by cowbird nest parasitism and habitat loss, it has successfully colonized suburban environments in the Phoenix, Arizona metropolitan area and may be fairly easily seen on the campus of Arizona State University. Despite its limited range, it is classified as a species of Least Concern in the IUCN Redlist, and there has been some range expansion along the Santa Cruz River as well as in Oak Creek Canyon near Sedona.

== Feeding ==
Abert's towhees usually forage on the ground among dense brush for seeds, but they also incorporate insects into their diet. Like other towhees, they scratch at the ground in a manner similar to quail, and will sometimes dig up and eat grubs. They can be attracted to feeders by providing cracked corn on the ground.
