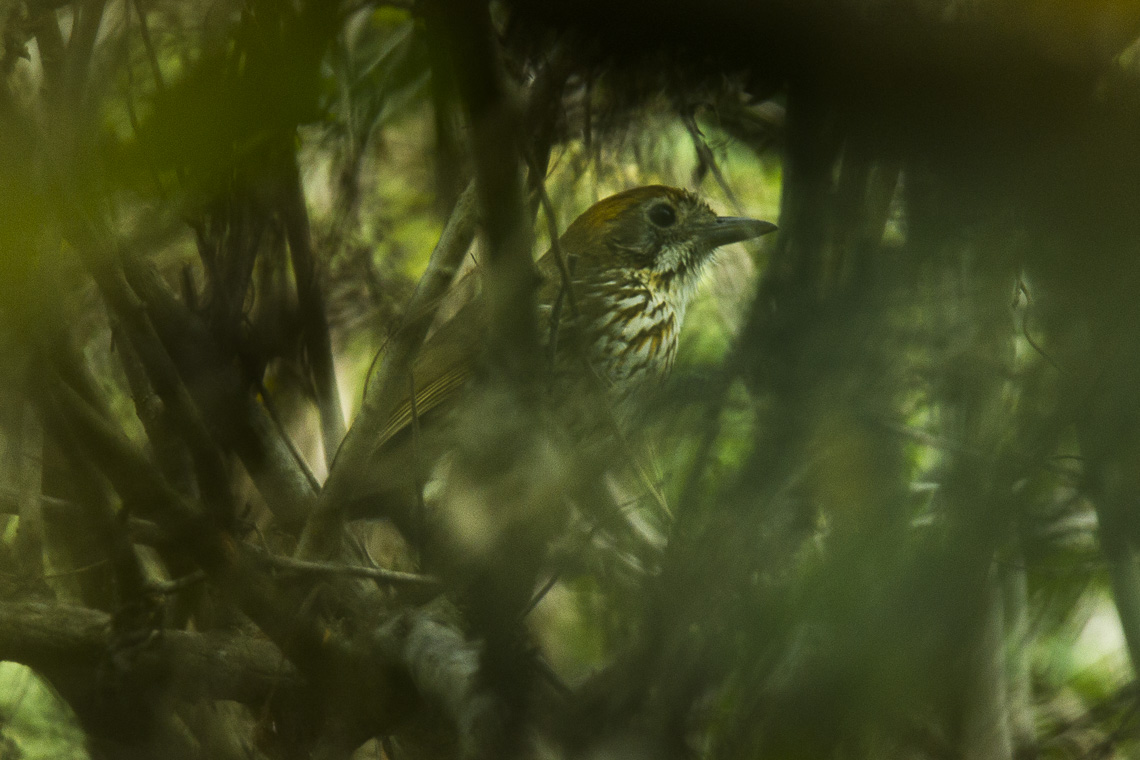

Conservation status
- Near Threatened (IUCN 3.1)

Scientific classification
- Kingdom: Animalia
- Phylum: Chordata
- Class: Aves
- Order: Passeriformes
- Family: Grallariidae
- Genus: Grallaria
- Species: G. watkinsi

Binomial name
- Grallaria watkinsi Chapman, 1919

= Watkins's antpitta =

Species of bird

Watkins's antpitta (Grallaria watkinsi) is a Near Threatened species of bird in the family Grallariidae. It is found in Ecuador and Peru.

== Taxonomy and systematics ==
Watkins's antpitta was originally described as a species. It was later regarded as a subspecies of the chestnut-crowned antpitta (G. ruficapilla) but on the basis of a 1995 publication it was returned to full species status.

The species' English name and specific epithet commemorate the English collector Henry George Watkins, who collected the first specimens in Peru. The two form a superspecies.

Watkins's antpitta is monotypic.

== Description ==
Grallaria antpittas are a "wonderful group of plump and round antbirds whose feathers are often fluffed up...they have stout bills [and] very short tails". Watkins's antpitta is about 18 cm (7.1 in) long and weighs 58 to 84 g (2.0 to 3.0 oz). The sexes have the same plumage. Adults have a pale rufous crown and nape, with thin whitish streaks on both and black spots on the forecrown. They have white lores, a white ring around the eye, pale olive upper ear coverts, and white lower ear coverts with thin olive streaks. Their back and tail are pale olive with some white streaks on the lower back. Their flight feathers are pale olive or pale tawny brown and their wing coverts pale olive. Their throat is white with thin dusky olive stripes on the side. The center of their breast is white or whitish buff with dusky streaks, the rest of their breast and their sides white with dusky olive streaks, and the center of their belly, their vent, and their undertail coverts unstreaked white. Both sexes have a dark brown iris, a blackish maxilla, a pale pinkish gray mandible, and pinkish to pale horn legs and feet.

== Distribution and habitat ==
Watkins's antpitta is found in Loja and El Oro provinces in southwestern Ecuador and Tumbes and Piura departments adjoining them in Peru. There is also an isolated population in the Cordillera de Colonche further north in Ecuador's Manabí and Guayas provinces. The species primarily inhabits dry deciduous and semi-deciduous forest and woodlands and to a lesser extent denser regenerating scrublands. In elevation it ranges from near sea level to 1,800 m (5,900 ft) in Ecuador and between 400 and 900 m (1,300 and 3,000 ft) in Peru.

== Behavior ==
=== Movement ===
Watkins's antpitta is resident throughout its range.

=== Feeding ===
The diet and foraging behavior of Watkins's antpitta have not been detailed but it is known to feed on insects. It is primarily terrestrial, foraging on or near the ground. It at least occasionally follows large mammals to capture prey disturbed by them.

=== Breeding ===
The breeding season of Watkins's antpitta is not known though it includes April, when a nestling was observed fledging. The species' nest is a bulky cup made of dry leaves, sticks, and mud with a lining of thinner twigs and fibers. The usual clutch size and incubation period are not known. Both parents provision nestlings.

=== Vocalization ===
The song of Watkins's antpitta is "a series of 4-7 well-enunciated and emphatic whistled notes, the first set all similar but the last longer and sharply upslurred, e.g., keeu, keew-kew-kew k-wheeeei?". Another description is "an accelerating series of descending hollow notes ending with a longer rising note: CLEW clew-clew'clew'clew cu-HOOEE?". Both sexes sing, typically from the ground or a low branch and at dawn and dusk. The species' call is similar to its song but has "fewer initial notes plus the last slurred one, or just the slurred one alone" and has been written as "clew-clewEE?".

== Status ==
The IUCN originally in 2004 assessed Watkins's antpitta as being of Least Concern and since 2013 as Near Threatened. It has a somewhat limited range and its estimated population of between 10,000 and 20,000 mature individuals is believed to be decreasing. "Clearance of forest and scrub for agricultural land, plus the loss of dense understorey through intense grazing by cattle and goats may adversely affect this species. It is however able to tolerate a considerable degree of habitat alteration." It is considered numerous in Ecuador and locally fairly common in Peru.
