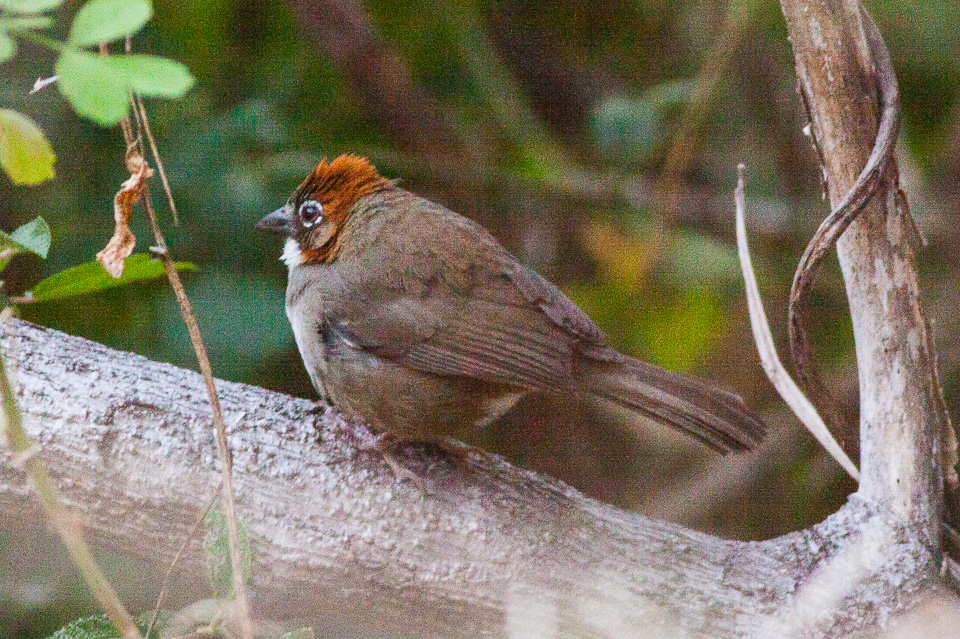

Conservation status
- Least Concern (IUCN 3.1)

Scientific classification
- Kingdom: Animalia
- Phylum: Chordata
- Class: Aves
- Order: Passeriformes
- Family: Passerellidae
- Genus: Melozone
- Species: M. kieneri

Binomial name
- Melozone kieneri (Bonaparte, 1850)

= Rusty-crowned ground sparrow =

Species of bird

The rusty-crowned ground sparrow (Melozone kieneri) is a species of bird in the family Passerellidae, the New World sparrows. It is endemic to Mexico.

== Taxonomy and systematics ==
The rusty-crowned ground sparrow was formally described in 1850 with the binomial Pyrgisoma kieneri. It was later reassigned to its current genus Melozone that had also been described in 1850.

The rusty-crowned ground sparrow has three subspecies, the nominate M. k. kieneri (Bonaparte, 1850), M. k. grisior Van Rossem, 1933, and M. k. rubricata (Cabanis, 1851).

== Description ==
The rusty-crowned ground sparrow is 15 to 18 cm (5.9 to 7.1 in) long and weighs 35 to 41 g (1.2 to 1.4 oz). The sexes have the same plumage. Adults have a dusky black forecrown and a rufous crown; the rufous continues around behind the dusky black ear coverts and then forward under them. They have white lores and a broken white eye-ring. Their upperparts, wings, and tail are brown. Their underparts are mostly white with a black spot in the center of the breast, brown flanks, and rufescent undertail coverts. Juveniles have a rich dusky brown head and upperparts with darker streaks on the latter. Their throat and underparts are dirty pale lemon with dusky brown streaks and their undertail coverts are pale cinnamon. Subspecies M. k. grisior is cinnamon rufous or tawny on the head where the nominate is rufous. Their upperparts, wings, tail, and flanks are deep grayish olive and their undertail coverts are cinnamon or cinnamon buff. M. k. rubricata has a brighter rufous crown and paler brown upperparts than the nominate. Both sexes of all subspecies have a dark brown iris, a black or blackish bill, and brownish or pinkish legs and feet.

== Distribution and habitat ==
The rusty-crowned ground sparrow is found in western Mexico's Sierra Madre Occidental, Sierra Madre del Sur, and Cordillera Neovolcanica. Subspecies M. k. grisior is the northernmost. It is found in extreme southeastern Sonora and northern Sinaloa. The nominate is found from central Sinaloa south to Colima. M. k. rubricata is found from Guanajuato and Michoacán east to Puebla and western Oaxaca. The species inhabits a variety of arid to semi-humid landscapes in the upper tropical and subtropical zones including thorn forest, dry brushy woodlands, arid scrublands, and secondary forest. Sources differ on its elevational range. A twentieth century publication states it is from sea level to 1,500 m (4,900 ft). Two more recent sources state it as sea level to 2,000 m (6,600 ft).

== Behavior ==
=== Movement ===
The rusty-crowned ground sparrow is a year-round resident.

=== Feeding ===
The rusty-crowned ground sparrow's diet has not been studied but is assumed to include seeds and arthropods. It forages on the ground and in low vegetation, traveling by hopping. It usually is seen singly or in pairs.

=== Breeding ===
Little is known about the rusty-crowned ground sparrow's breeding biology except from observations of 11 nests published in 1962. They were found in June and July. They were tidy cups made from dry leaves and grass stems lined with fine grass and cattle hair. They were in shrubs and saplings between about 0.9 and 1.8 m (3 and 6 ft) above the ground. The eggs were pale bluish white and mostly unmarked. Nine of the nests were parasitized by bronzed cowbirds (Molothrus aeneus) and one by a brown-headed cowbird (M. ater). The full breeding season, incubation period, time to fledging, and details of parental care are not known.

=== Vocalization ===
The rusty-crowned ground sparrow's song is a "very high simple calm unstructured tjitit-tjitit-tutututut". It also makes "a high, thin, slightly wiry lisping dzzzzzzzziu or ssssssziu, a high, thin ti, often doubled, and high, sharp chips, tk or tsik".

== Status ==
The IUCN has assessed the rusty-crowned ground sparrow as being of Least Concern. It has a large range; its estimated population of at least 50,000 mature individuals is believed to be decreasing. No immediate threats have been identified.
