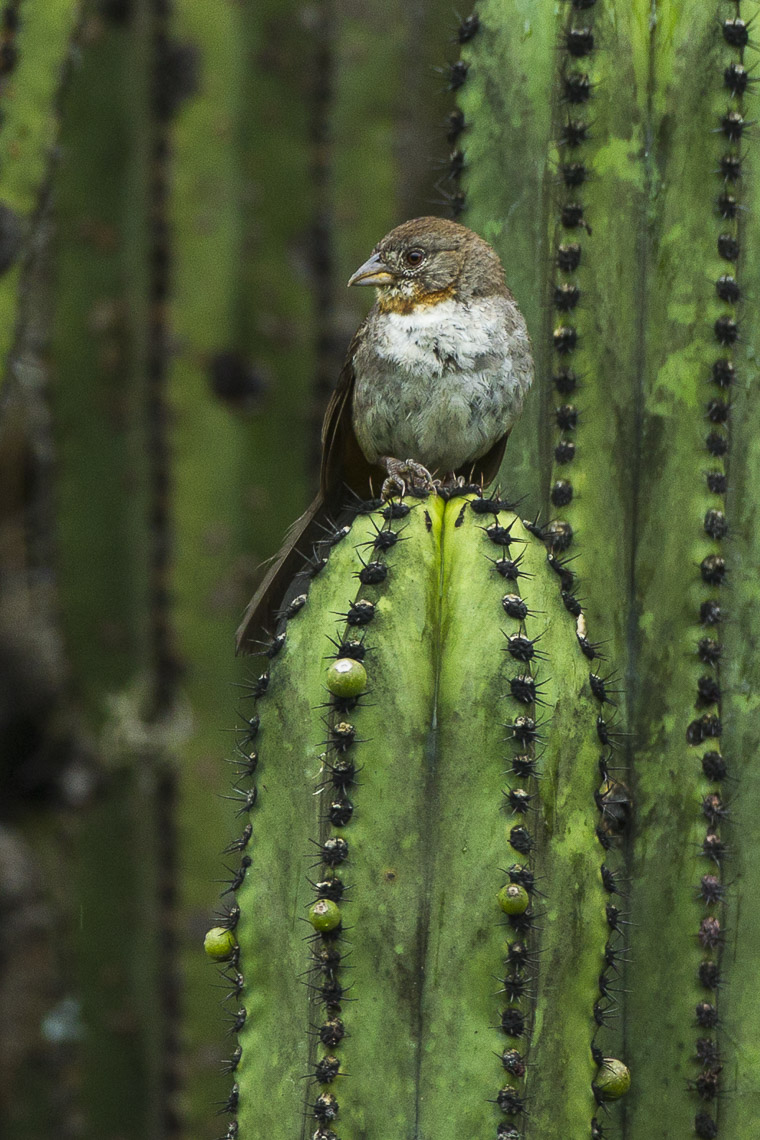

Conservation status
- Least Concern (IUCN 3.1)

Scientific classification
- Kingdom: Animalia
- Phylum: Chordata
- Class: Aves
- Order: Passeriformes
- Family: Passerellidae
- Genus: Melozone
- Species: M. albicollis

Binomial name
- Melozone albicollis (Sclater, PL, 1858)

= White-throated towhee =

Species of bird

The white-throated towhee (Melozone albicollis) is a species of bird in the family Passerellidae, the New World sparrows. It is endemic to Mexico.

== Taxonomy and systematics ==
The white-throated towhee was formally described in 1858 with the binomial Pipilo albicollis. Following a study published in 2009 the white-throated towhee and three other species were transferred from Pipilo to Melozone, a genus that had been erected in 1850.

The white-throated towhee has two subspecies, the nominate M. a. albicollis (Sclater, PL, 1858) and M. a. marshalli (Parkes, 1974).

== Description ==
The white-throated towhee is a large sparrow with a long tail, 18.5 to 22.5 cm (7.3 to 8.9 in) long and weighing 42 to 50 g (1.5 to 1.8 oz). The sexes have the same plumage. Adults of the nominate subspecies have a brown crown and nape. They have a white supercilium to the eye, some whitish below the eye, and a blackish stripe on the cheek. The rest of their face is brown above and chestnut below. Their upperparts and tail are brown. Their wing is mostly brown with white on the median coverts that shows as two wing bars. Their chin is white and their throat rusty cinnamon with white under it. The centers of their breast and belly are whitish mottled with gray, the sides of their breast gray, and their flanks and undertail coverts cinnamon. Juveniles have pale cinnamon wing bars and brownish mottling on the breast; they are otherwise like adults. Subspecies M. a. marshalli is duller and grayer overall than the nominate. Both subspecies have a reddish iris, a dusky brown maxilla, a paler brown mandible, and horn-colored legs and feet.

== Distribution and habitat ==
The white-throated towhee is a bird of pine-oak forest and montane shrub- and scrublands in the interior valleys of the Sierra Madre del Sur. Subspecies M. a. marshalli is the more northerly of the two; it is found in southern Puebla and perhaps into eastern Guerrero. The nominate is found from eastern Guerrero east to central Oaxaca. Sources differ somewhat on its elevational range. A twentieth century publication states it is 1,150 to 2,800 m (3,800 to 9,200 ft). A 2006 field guide places it between 1,000 and 2,500 m (3,300 and 8,200 ft). A 2020 source places it between 1,000 and 2,800 m (3,300 and 9,200 ft).

== Behavior ==
=== Movement ===
The white-throated towhee is a year-round resident.

=== Feeding ===
The white-throated towhee's diet has not been studied but is assumed to be primarily seeds and include insects and fruit. It forages on the ground and in low vegetation.

=== Breeding ===
The white-throated towhee breeds between February and May. Its nest is a large cup made from dry grass and lined with fine fibers including hair. It is typically on the ground or in a low bush. The clutch is four eggs that are pale blue to whitish blue with dark brown or reddish spots. The incubation period, time to fledging, and details of parental care are not known.

=== Vocalization ===
The white-throated towhee's song is described as "very high warbling...strident in places, accelerating and rising in pitch in phrases [and] includes --pirrup-pirrup-pirrup--". Another description is "a series of chipping notes with one or more introductory notes, chik chik tchu-chu-chu-chu chi-i-ir". Its call is "a slurred metallic churenk".

== Status ==
The IUCN has assessed the white-throated towhee as being of Least Concern. Its estimated population of at least 50,000 mature individuals is believed to be stable. No immediate threats have been identified. It is considered "common within its limited range".
