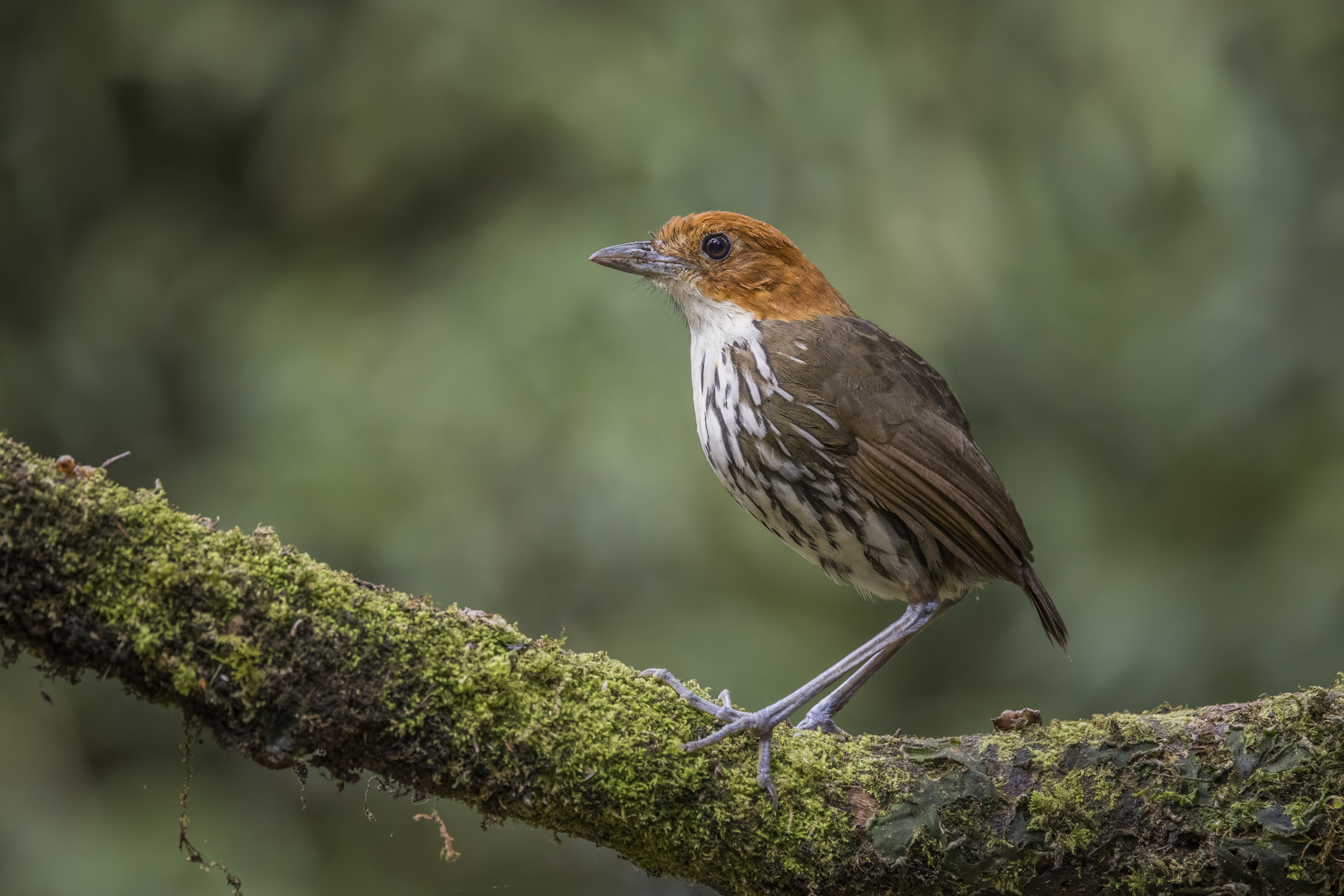
- G. r. ruficapilla, Colombia

Conservation status
- Least Concern (IUCN 3.1)

Scientific classification
- Kingdom: Animalia
- Phylum: Chordata
- Class: Aves
- Order: Passeriformes
- Family: Grallariidae
- Genus: Grallaria
- Species: G. ruficapilla

Binomial name
- Grallaria ruficapilla Lafresnaye, 1842

= Chestnut-crowned antpitta =

Species of bird

The chestnut-crowned antpitta (Grallaria ruficapilla) is a species of bird in the family Grallariidae. It is found in Colombia, Ecuador, Peru, and Venezuela.

== Taxonomy and systematics ==
The chestnut-crowned antpitta has these seven subspecies:

- G. r. ruficapilla Lafresnaye, 1842
- G. r. perijana Phelps, WH & Gilliard, 1940
- G. r. avilae Hellmayr & Seilern, 1914
- G. r. nigrolineata Sclater, PL, 1890
- G. r. connectens Chapman, 1923
- G. r. albiloris Taczanowski, 1880
- G. r. interior Zimmer, JT, 1934

What is now Watkins's antpitta (G. watkinsi) was previously a subspecies of the chestnut-crowned antpitta. The two form a superspecies.

== Description ==
Grallaria antpittas are a "wonderful group of plump and round antbirds whose feathers are often fluffed up...they have stout bills [and] very short tails". The chestnut-crowned antpitta is 18 to 23 cm (7.1 to 9.1 in) long and weighs 70 to 98 g (2.5 to 3.5 oz). The sexes have the same plumage. Adults of the nominate subspecies G. r. ruficapilla have a rufous crown, nape, and face. Their back, rump, tail, and wings are olivaceous. Their throat, breast, and belly are white with ochraceous edges on some breast feathers and olivaceous and blackish streaks on their sides and sometimes their breast.

The other subspecies of the chestnut-crowned antpitta differ from the nominate and each other thus:

- G. r. perijana: somewhat heavier and darker streaking on the breast than the nominate, though less so than avilae and nigrolineata; ochraceous-orange cast to breast and upper belly
- G. r. avilae: heavier and darker streaking on the breast than the nominate, with brighter crown and nape and paler greenish olive upperparts
- G. r. nigrolineata: heavier and darker streaking on the breast than the nominate
- G. r. connectens: lighter upperparts than nominate, with whitish lores, olivaceous cast to flight feathers and more fulvous underparts with less heavy streaking
- G. r. albiloris: like the nominate but with white lores and "moustache" and some white on the ear coverts
- G. r. interior: lighter and more brownish olive streaks on breast, sides, and flanks than nominate center of breast more strongly orange-ochraceous

All subspecies have a brown or dark brown iris, a black bill with a gray base on the mandible, and pale blue-gray legs and feet.

== Distribution and habitat ==
The chestnut-crowned antpitta has a disjunct distribution. The subspecies are found thus:

- G. r. ruficapilla: all three Andean ranges in Colombia and south through Ecuador to but not in the southwest of the country
- G. r. perijana: Serranía del Perijá in extreme northern Colombia and slightly into western Venezuela
- G. r. avilae: Venezuelan Coastal Range between Lara and Miranda states
- G. r. nigrolineata: Andes of Venezuela between northern Trujillo and northern Táchira states
- G. r. connectens: El Oro and Loja provinces in southwestern Ecuador
- G. r. albiloris: western slope of northwestern Peruvian Andes in Piura, Cajamarca, and Lambayeque departments
- G. r. interior: north-central Peru in Amazonas and San Martín departments

The chestnut-crowned antpitta inhabits a wide variety of landscapes including subtropical and tropical (semi-humid and humid) montane forest, woodlands, and secondary forest. It occurs in unbroken forest interior, at its edges, and in somewhat open areas within the forest such as those caused by fallen trees. It is strongly associated with Chusquea bamboo where that is present. It appears comfortable in some human-modified habitats such as areas of mixed pasture and scrubland. In elevation it occurs between 1,200 and 3,000 m (3,900 and 9,800 ft) in Colombia, mostly between 1,900 and 3,100 m (6,200 and 10,200 ft) in Ecuador, between 1,200 and 3,100 m (3,900 and 10,200 ft) in Peru, and between 1,300 and 3,000 m (4,300 and 9,800 ft) in Venezuela.

== Behavior ==
=== Movement ===
The chestnut-crowned antpitta is believed to be resident throughout its range.

=== Feeding ===
The chestnut-crowned antpitta is one of several antpittas that regularly come to feeding stations set up to allow viewing them. There they are fed earthworms and similar invertebrates, which are thought to also be a large part of their natural diet. In the wild they also feed on arthropods. They primarily forage on the ground, running and stopping to probe leaf litter, but occasionally climb higher to take caterpillars and other prey from foliage. The occasionally follow army ant swarms to capture prey disturbed by the ants, and are thought to follow tapirs and other large mammals for the same reason. They rarely join mixed-species feeding flocks.

=== Breeding ===
The chestnut-crowned antpitta's breeding season has not been defined. Only two nests have been described. They were cups made of roots, dead leaves, twigs, and moss lined with rootlets. One was in a clump of leaves and small branches about 2 m (7 ft) above the ground. The usual clutch size is not known for certain but appears to be two eggs. Both parents are assumed to build the nest; both are known to incubate the clutch and care for nestlings. The incubation period and time to fledging are not known.

=== Vocalization ===
The chestnut-crowned antpitta sings both from the ground and from low perch. Its song is "a monotonously repeated, three-note, wheee, whooo-whooo", also written as "wheee whuuu wheuu", "hee hoo-HEW", and "püe, paaw, puuee". The species' alarm call is "a one note, sharp peeyu!".

== Status ==
The IUCN has assessed the chestnut-crowned antpitta as being of Least Concern. It has a very large range; its population size is not known and is believed to be increasing. No immediate threats have been identified. "[I]t is obvious that Chestnut-crowned Antpitta can tolerate some degree of human-alteration of their habitat. It remains possible that, in some areas, human activities may even create more habitat for this species, and actually boost population levels."
