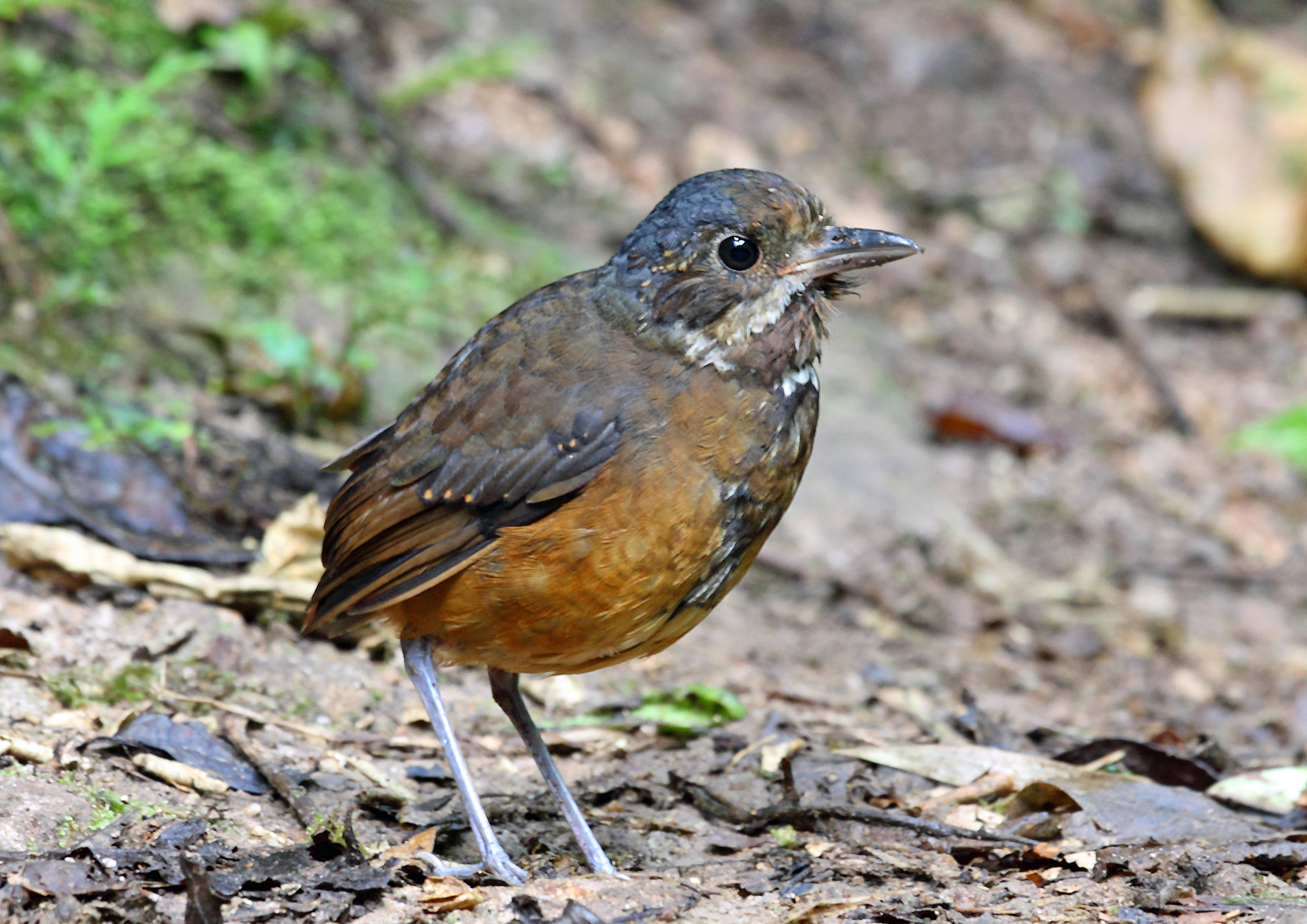
- Moustached antpitta, Ecuador

Conservation status
- Vulnerable (IUCN 3.1)

Scientific classification
- Kingdom: Animalia
- Phylum: Chordata
- Class: Aves
- Order: Passeriformes
- Family: Grallariidae
- Genus: Grallaria
- Species: G. alleni

Binomial name
- Grallaria alleni Chapman, 1912

= Moustached antpitta =

Species of bird

The moustached antpitta (Grallaria alleni) is a Vulnerable species of bird placed in the family Grallariidae. It is found in Colombia and Ecuador.

== Taxonomy and systematics ==
The moustached antpitta has two subspecies, the nominate G. a. alleni (Chapman, 1912) and G. a. andaquiensis (Hernández-Camacho & Rodríguez-M, 1979). It and the scaled antpitta (G. guatimalensis) form a superspecies, and some authors have suggested that they are conspecific.

The species' specific epithet honors Arthur A. Allen, who collected the type specimen in 1911 and later founded the Cornell Lab of Ornithology.

== Description ==
Grallaria antpittas are a "wonderful group of plump and round antbirds whose feathers are often fluffed up...they have stout bills [and] very short tails". The moustached antpitta is 16.5 to 17 cm (6.5 to 6.7 in) long; two males weighed 64 and 77 g (2.3 and 2.7 oz). The sexes have the same plumage. Adults of the nominate subspecies have a light olive brown forecrown and a slate gray crown and nape with thin blackish edges on the feathers. They have white lores, olive brown ear coverts, and a wide white "moustache" with thin black streaks in it. Their upperparts are dark rufescent brown to olive brown with thin blackish edges on the feathers that give a faint scaly appearance. Their tail is rufous chestnut to deep tawny. Their chin and throat are rufescent brown with a white crescent below the throat. Their breast is olive brown with thin white streaks and their belly is buffy white. Subspecies G. a. andaquiensis is browner than the nominate and has an ochraceous belly. Both subspecies have a dark brown iris, a black bill, and vinaceous gray legs and feet.

== Distribution and habitat ==
The moustached antpitta has a disjunct distribution. The nominate subspecies is found in the northern and central parts of Colombia's Western Andes and on the western slope of the Central Andes. Subspecies G. a. andaquiensis is found in the upper Magdalena River Valley in Colombia and on both slopes of the Andes in Ecuador as far south as Cotopaxi and Napo provinces. The species inhabits the understory of humid montane forest, where it favors dense undergrowth in ravines and steep slopes.

== Behavior ==
=== Movement ===
The moustached antpitta is resident throughout its range.

=== Feeding ===
The moustached antpitta is one of several antpittas that regularly come to feeding stations set up to allow viewing them. There they are fed earthworms and similar invertebrates, which are thought to also be a large part of their natural diet. In the wild they are known to feed on arthropods though details are lacking. They are highly terrestrial, seldom being seen more than 3 m (10 ft) above the ground.

=== Breeding ===
The moustached antpitta's breeding season has not been detailed but includes September to November in Colombia and March in Ecuador. Its nest is a bulky cup made of dead leaves, green mosses, rootlets, and other small fibers, placed in an epiphyte or on a branch. All the known nests were within 1.3 m (4 ft) of the ground. The clutch is two light blue eggs. The incubation period is not known; fledging occurs 15 to 17 days after hatching. Both parents provision the nestlings.

=== Vocalization ===
The moustached antpitta's song is "a slightly ascending series of hollow notes that gradually become louder; higher pitched and slower paced than Scaled Antpitta's song" (which see here).

== Status ==
The IUCN originally in 1988 assessed the moustached antpitta as Threatened, then in 1996 as Endangered, and since 2005 as Vulnerable. It has a highly fragmented range and its estimated population of 1500 to 1700 mature individuals is believed to be decreasing. The principle threat is habitat loss. "However, the species has been shown to use secondary forest freely within parts of its Colombian range and it was found in mature secondary forest on the Cotopaxi." It is considered uncommon and local in Colombia. It was not discovered in Ecuador until the 1990s and is still not well known there. "Like all species of humid montane forests, Moustached Antpitta is vulnerable to deforestation, forest degradation, and habitat fragmentation."
