= Florent Prévost =

French naturalist and illustrator

Florent Prévost (English: /preɪˈvoʊ/ pray-VOH, French: [flɔʁɑ̃ pʁevo]; 1794 – 1 February 1870) was a French naturalist and illustrator.

Prévost was assistant naturalist at the Muséum National d'Histoire Naturelle. He was the author of various zoological works, including Les Pigeons par Madame Knip (1843) and, with C. L. Lemaire, Histoire Naturelle des Oiseaux d'Europe (1845). He did illustrative work in books by Coenraad Jacob Temminck (1778–1858), Charles Lucien Bonaparte (1803–1857) and Georges-Louis Leclerc de Buffon (1707–1788).

He worked on the birds from the voyage of La Venus with Marc Athanese Parfait Oeillet Des Murs, and on the birds and mammals brought back from the French expedition to Abyssinia between 1839 and 1843.

Prevost's ground sparrow (Melozone biarcuatum), Prevost's squirrel (Callosciurus prevostii), and Gerard's water snake (Gerarda prevostiana) are named after him.

== Associated writings ==
- Voyage autour du monde sur la frégate la Vénus pendant les années 1836-1839 (with Isidore Geoffroy Saint-Hilaire and others) Paris : Gide, 1840-1864 - Travel around the world on the frigate Venus during the years 1836 to 1839.
- Voyage en Abyssinie exécuté pendant les années 1839, 1840, 1841, 1842, 1843 (with Antoine-Alphonse Guichenot and others) Paris : A. Bertrand, 184X - Voyage to Abyssinia performed during the years 1839, 1840, 1841, 1842, 1843.
- Histoire naturelle des oiseaux exotiques (with H L Pauquet and C L Lemaire) Paris : F. Savy, (1864) - Natural history of exotic birds.
- Histoire naturelle des oiseaux d'Europe: passereaux (with C L Lemaire) Paris : F. Savy, (1876) - Natural history of the birds of Europe.
