= Marc Athanase Parfait Œillet des Murs =

French ornithologist, politician and historian

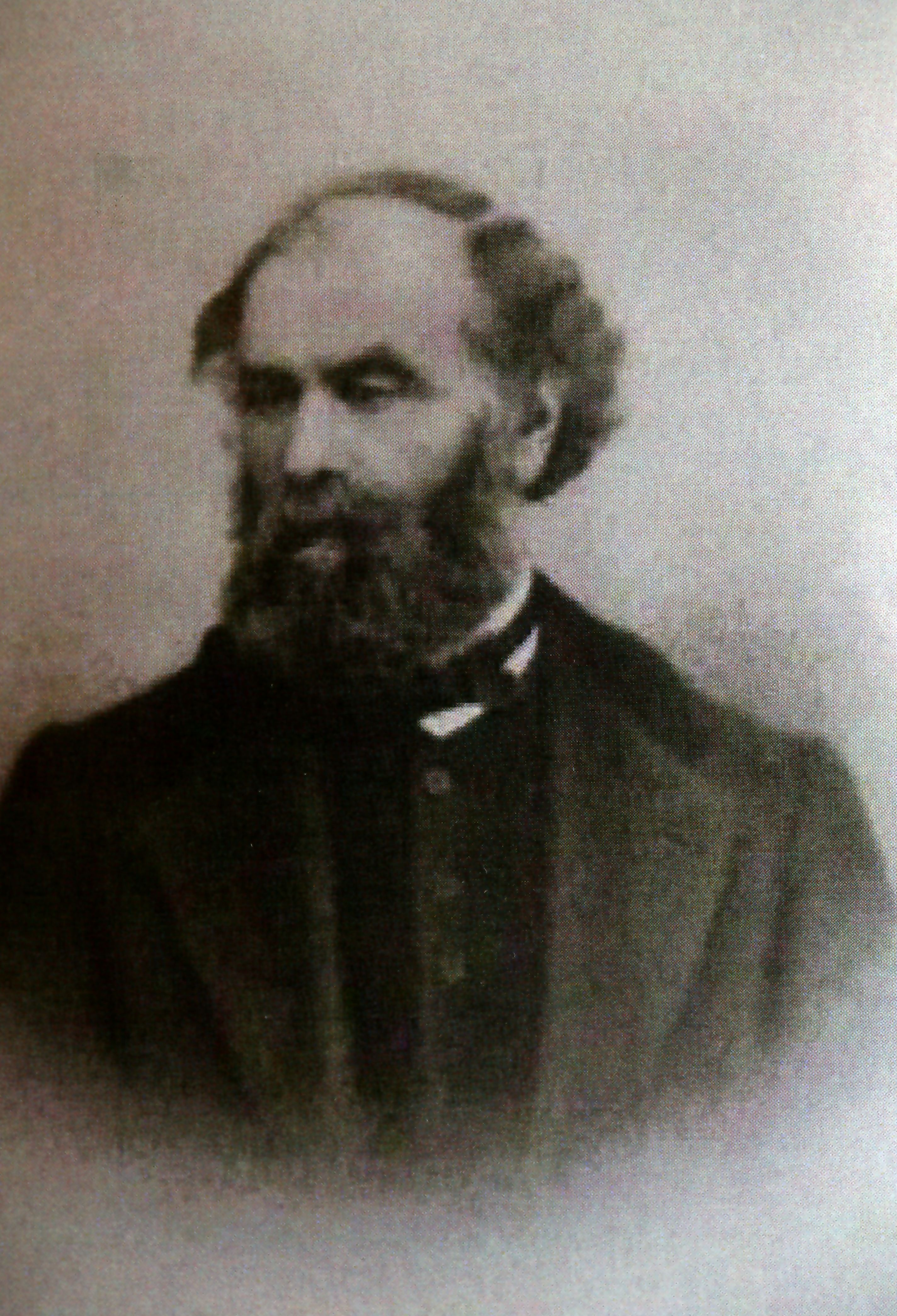
Picture of mayor M. Œillet des Murs in the town hall of Nogent-le-Rotrou

Marc Athanase Parfait Œillet des Murs (Paris, 18 April 1804 – Nogent-le-Rotrou, 25 February 1894), also known as Marc Oeillet des Murs, was a French amateur ornithologist and local politician and historian.

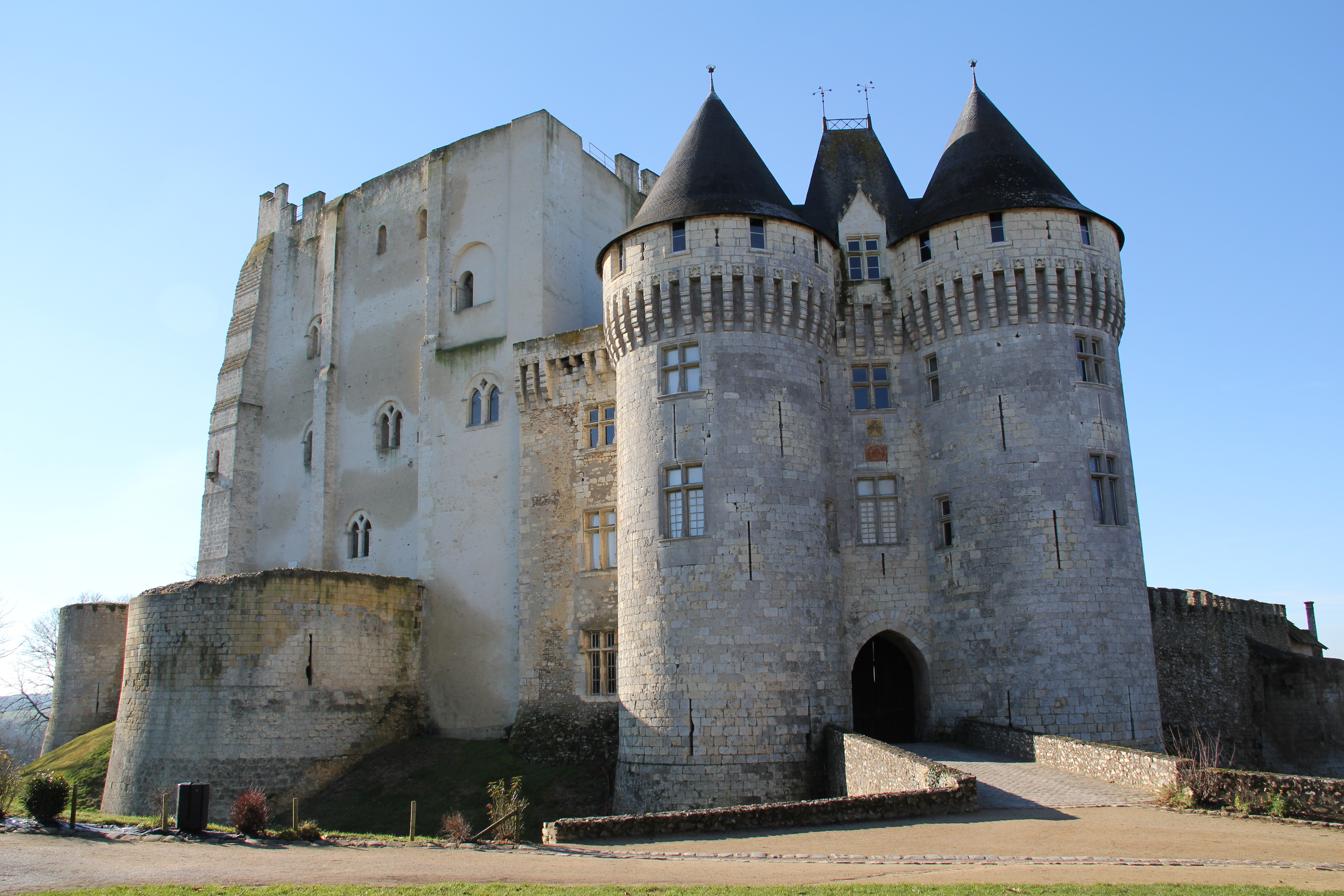
Château Saint-Jean

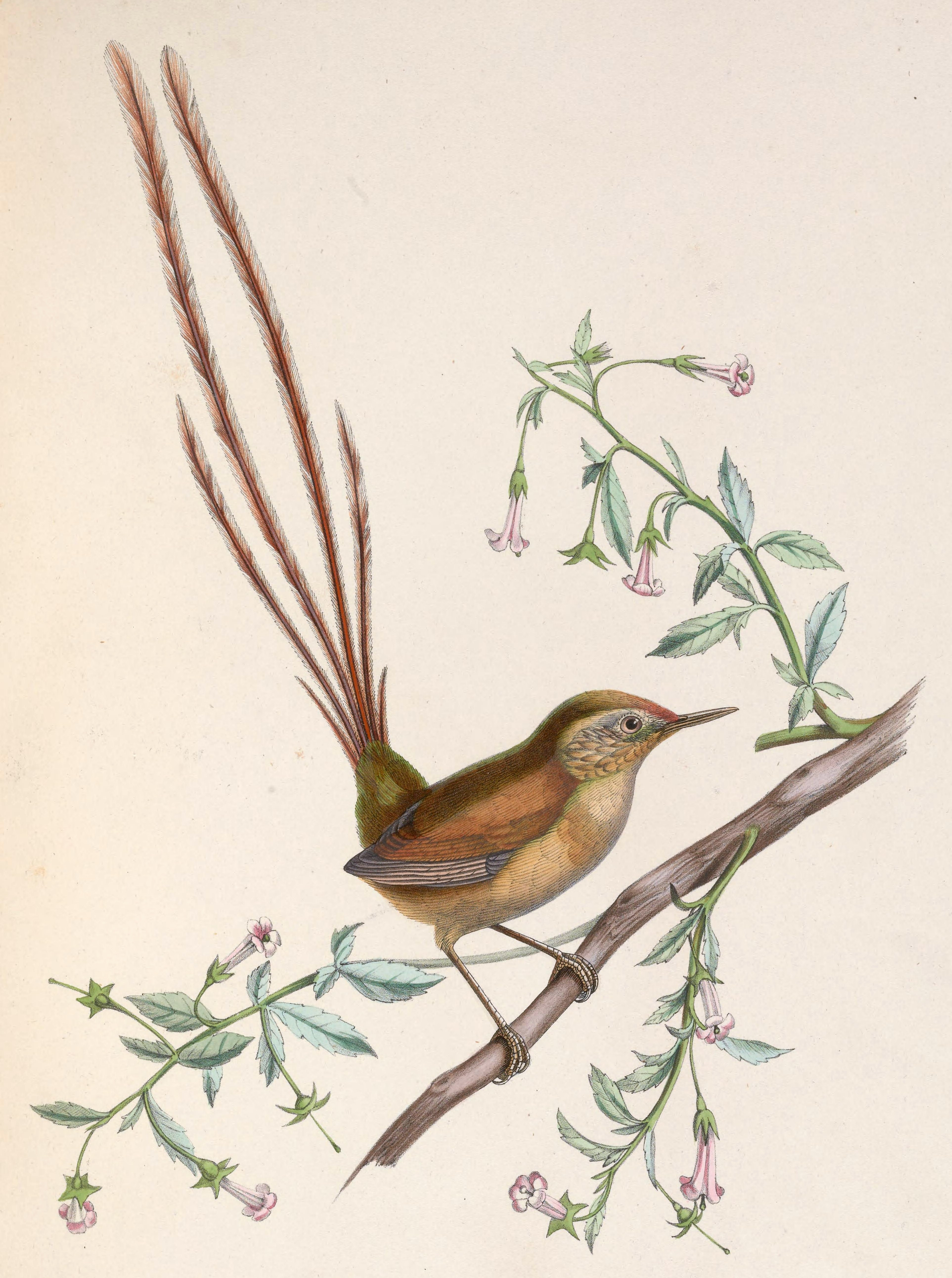
Des Murs's illustration of Des Murs's wiretail, a species named after him.

== Life ==
Born to Jacques Philippe Athanase Œillet Des Murs and Marie Henriette Gard, he entered the magistracy in 1830 and left it in 1838. In 1841 he became a lawyer in the Court of Cassation, but in 1846 retired to the department of Eure-et-Loir, where, in 1843, he had bought a castle called the Château St. Jean near the town of Nogent-le-Rotrou and begun extensive restoration work on it.

He was the mayor of Nogent-le-Rotrou from 1860 to 1868. In 1885, having sunk a good deal of his fortune into the restoration of the Château, he sold it. He died in 1894, aged 89. He married Caroline Euphrasie Naulot, who survived him.

== Ornithology ==
He published many papers. His major ornithological works include

- Iconographie Ornithologique, (1849), a book of illustrations and descriptions of birds.
- The ornithological section of Voyage autour du monde sur la frégate la Vénus: Zoologie (Voyage Around the World on the Frigate Vénus: Zoology), in collaboration with Florent Prévost (1855), in which they described several new species.
- Traité général d’oologie ornithologique au point de vue de la classification (A General Treatise on Ornithological Oology from the Point of View of Classification), 1860. One reviewer praised the author's knowledge of oology but disagreed with his reliance on resemblances of eggs, with too little attention to other information, in the classification of birds.
- Leçons élémentaires sur l'histoire naturelle des oiseaux (Elementary Lessons on the Natural History of Birds), a popularization of ornithology, in which he joined Jules Verreaux in collaborating with Jean-Charles Chenu.

== History ==
His main historical work is Histoire des comtes du Perche de la famille des Rotrou de 943 à 1231 (History of the Counts of Perche of the Rotrou Family from 943 to 1231), 1856.

== Surname ==
"Des Murs" is a known French surname meaning "of the walls". "Œillet" means "carnation" (or any Dianthus), so "Œillet des Murs" could be a rare surname meaning "carnation of the walls". Which of those was his surname seems to have been unclear even during his lifetime. His name appears on the title pages of his books as "M. O. des Murs" and as "O. des Murs" with no other names or titles, though he signs a dedication "P. O. des Murs". It also appears as "O. des Murs" in books where the names of his co-authors, Chenu and Verreaux and Prévost, are given with initials and surnames, suggesting that he thought of "O." as his initial and "Des Murs" as his surname. Likewise his contribution to Chenu's Encyclopédie d'histoire naturelle is listed as by "M. des Murs". On the other hand, he was cited with the family name "Oeillet des Murs" in his time, on his death certificate and later, and Marc Oeillet des Murs appears as a writer on Normandy.
