= G. nana =

G. nana may refer to:

- Grallaricula nana, the slaty-crowned antpitta, a bird species
- Grevillea nana, C.A.Gardner, a flowering plant species
- Grindelia nana, the Idaho gumplant or Idaho gumweed, a flowering plant species

== See also ==
- Nana (disambiguation)
