= Scallop-breasted antpitta =

Conservation status
- Near Threatened (IUCN 3.1)

Scientific classification
- Kingdom: Animalia
- Phylum: Chordata
- Class: Aves
- Order: Passeriformes
- Family: Grallariidae
- Genus: Grallaricula
- Species: G. loricata

Binomial name
- Grallaricula loricata (Sclater, PL, 1857)

Synonyms
- Grallaria loricata

Species of bird

The scallop-breasted antpitta (Grallaricula loricata) is a Near Threatened species of bird in the family Grallariidae. It is endemic to Venezuela.

== Taxonomy and systematics ==
The scallop-breasted antpitta was originally described in 1857 as Grallaria loricata by Philip Sclater, and a year later reclassified by him into genus Grallaricula. The scallop-breasted antpitta is monotypic. However, one prominent ornithologist has suggested that the Peruvian antpitta (G. peruviana) might be a subspecies of it.

== Description ==
"Grallaricula are very small Andean antpittas, found mostly in low dense vegetation (such as treefall gaps, stream edges, and bamboo thickets)." The scallop-breasted antpitta is about 11 cm (4.3 in) long. The sexes have the same plumage. Adults have a buff loral patch, a chestnut rufous supercilium, a buff yellow eyering, and a fuscous "moustache". Their crown and nape are chestnut rufous with sparse black streaks. Their upperparts and tail are olivaceous brown. Their flight feathers are fuscous to bronzy and their wing coverts rufous to bronzy. Their chin and throat are buff-yellow. Their breast is maize yellow that becomes creamy white on their belly. The breast feathers have a strong scallop pattern formed by olive bases and black edges at the tips. They have a brown iris, a black maxilla, a yellowish mandible with a black tip, and pinkish gray legs and feet.

== Distribution and habitat ==
The scallop-breasted antpitta is found only in northern Venezuela. A large part of its range is in the Venezuelan Coastal Range from Carabobo state east into the Capital District. A smaller range is further west in the Sierra de Aroa in Yaracuy state. It primarily inhabits the understory of humid montane cloudforest and less frequently is found in nearby secondary forest. In elevation it ranges between 1,440 and 2,100 m (4,700 and 6,900 ft) though there are unconfirmed records as low as 1,200 m (3,900 ft).

== Behavior ==
=== Movement ===
The scallop-breasted antpitta is resident throughout its range.

=== Feeding ===
The scallop-breasted antpitta's diet is not known in detail but includes insects and other arthropods. It apparently forages singly or in pairs in low vegetation but rarely on the ground.

=== Breeding ===
The scallop-breasted antpitta appears to breed at any time of year, but nothing else is known about the species' breeding biology.

=== Vocalization ===
As of September 2024 xeno-canto had only five recordings of scallop-breasted antpitta vocalizations and the Cornell Lab of Ornithology's Macaulay Library fewer than 20. "The most frequently heard vocalization is a melancholy shiiiuu note, repeated successively three to five times or separated by three second intervals." Males also make a more drawn-out version of it, "shiiiiiiiiuuuuu", and both sexes "produce soft, nazal contact calls while foraging in pairs".

== Status ==
The IUCN has assessed the scallop-breasted antpitta as Near Threatened. It has a small range; its population size is not known and is believed to be decreasing. "Although there is still an extensive forest cover within its range, habitat loss owing to fires and conversion for agriculture and settlements are taking place, even inside of protected areas." Though a 2003 field guide described the species as "[r]are or possibly quite local", more recent surveys assessed it as fairly common in suitable habitat. "Seemingly healthy populations still exist in San Esteban, Henri Pittier and El Avila National Parks, Venezuela."
