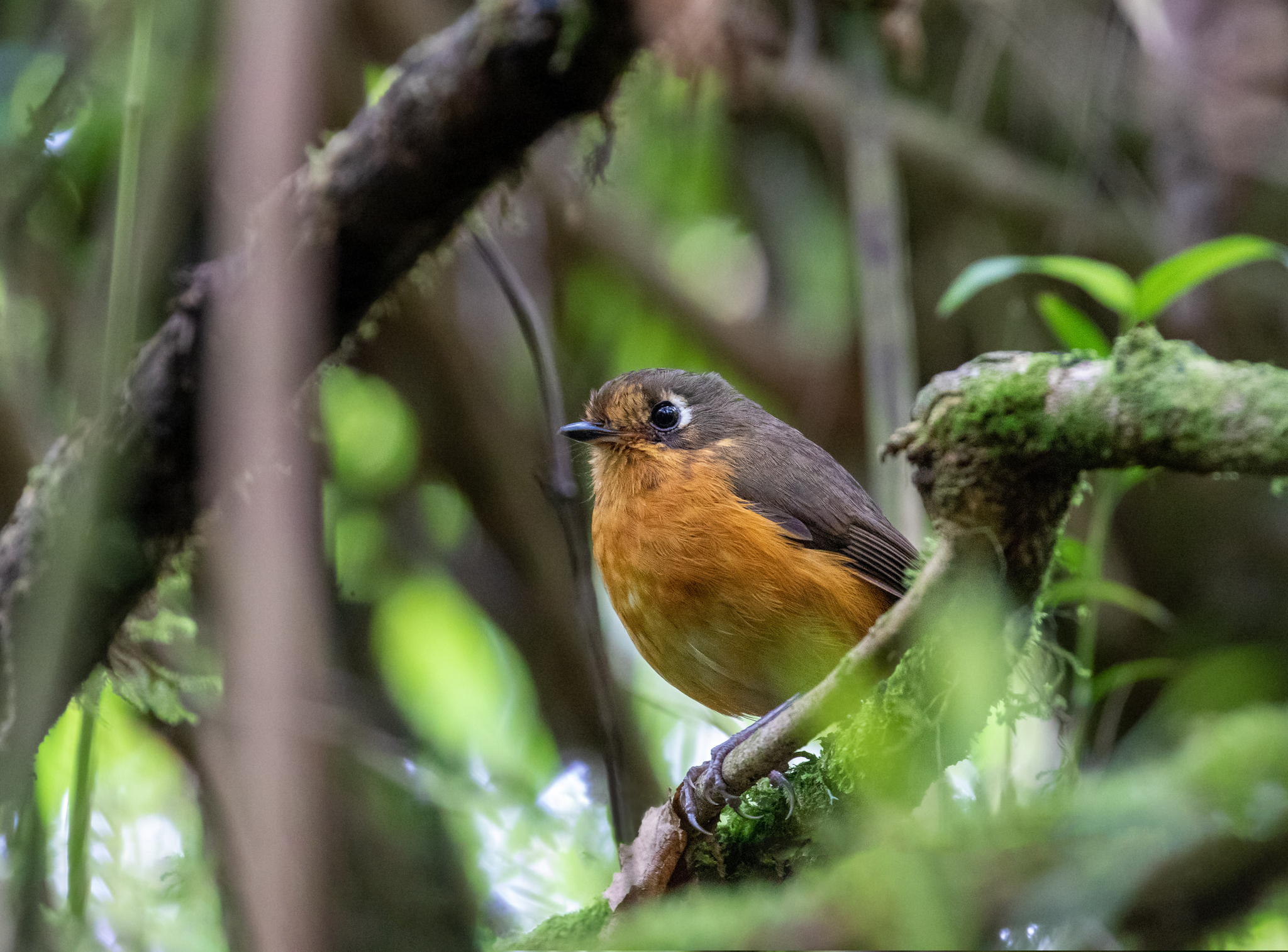

Conservation status
- Least Concern (IUCN 3.1)

Scientific classification
- Kingdom: Animalia
- Phylum: Chordata
- Class: Aves
- Order: Passeriformes
- Family: Grallariidae
- Genus: Grallaricula
- Species: G. leymebambae

Binomial name
- Grallaricula leymebambae Carriker, 1933

Synonyms
- Grallaricula ferrugineipectus leymebambae

= Rufous-breasted antpitta =

Species of bird

The rufous-breasted antpitta (Grallaricula leymebambae), also called Leymebamba antpitta, is a species of bird in the family Grallariidae. It is found in Bolivia, Ecuador, and Peru.

== Taxonomy and systematics ==
The rufous-breasted antpitta was originally described in 1933 as a subspecies of the rusty-breasted antpitta (G. ferrugineipectus). A study published in 2018 showed it to be a full species.

The rufous-breasted antpitta is monotypic.

== Description ==
"Grallaricula are very small Andean antpittas, found mostly in low dense vegetation (such as treefall gaps, stream edges, and bamboo thickets)." The rufous-breasted antpitta is about 10 to 12 cm (3.9 to 4.7 in) long and weighs 13 to 21 g (0.46 to 0.74 oz). The sexes have the same plumage. Adults have a large buffy ochraceous spot on their lores and a white arc behind their eye on an otherwise olive brown face. Their upperparts, wings, and tail are olive brown with a rufous tinge to the crown and seal brown edges on the flight feathers. Their throat and breast are rich cinnamon ochraceous with a white crescent below their breast. Their central belly is white. They have a brown iris, a black bill with a white or pinkish base to the mandible, and pink or dusky gray legs and feet.

== Distribution and habitat ==
The rufous-breasted antpitta has a disjunct distribution. One range begins in Peru south of the Maranon River in Amazonas Department and continues south on the eastern slope of the Andes into Bolivia as far as La Paz Department. From Huánuco south it occurs only patchily. The other, much smaller, range is on the western slope of the Andes in Peru from Lambayeque Department north through Piura Department slightly into southern Loja Province in extreme southwestern Ecuador. The rufous-breasted antpitta inhabits the undergrowth of humid and semi-humid montane forest. It favors areas with thickets, vine tangles, and bamboo. In elevation it ranges between 2,000 and 3,250 m (6,600 and 10,700 ft) on the east slope in Colombia and between 1,750 and 2,450 m (5,700 and 8,000 ft) in the smaller west slope range.

== Behavior ==
=== Movement ===
The rufous-breasted antpitta is resident throughout its range.

=== Feeding ===
The rufous-breasted antpitta's diet is not known in detail but includes insects. Its foraging behavior is not known but is assumed to be similar to that of its former "parent" rusty-breasted antpitta. That species hops through thick vegetation, usually within 2 to 3 m (7 to 10 ft) of the ground, gleaning prey from foliage, mossy branches, and from under bark. It sometimes makes short sallies or leaps to take prey and occasionally searches leaf litter on the ground.

=== Breeding ===
The rufous-breasted antpitta's nest is a shallow bowl of rootlets, fungal rhizomorphs, and leaf rachides on top of a stick platform. It is built in small bushes or vine tangles up to about 2 m (7 ft) above the ground. Nothing else is known about the species' breeding biology.

=== Vocalization ===
The rufous-breasted antpitta's song is "a moderate to fast-paced (6–9 notes/sec), even-pitched or slightly rising-falling, pure-toned series of whistled notes: hee-hee-hee-hee-hee-hee-hee-hee". Its calls include "a descending tew and tew tip (the number of tip notes variable), or a moderately paced (3–5 notes/sec) slightly descending series of hollow, descending whistles: chew-chew-chew-chew-chew".

== Status ==
The IUCN has assessed the rufous-breasted antpitta as being of Least Concern. It has a large range; its population size is not known and is believed to be stable. No immediate threats have been identified. It is considered fairly common in the northern part of its east slope range and less common to the south. It is considered local and uncommon in its small west slope range. It occurs in several protected areas.
