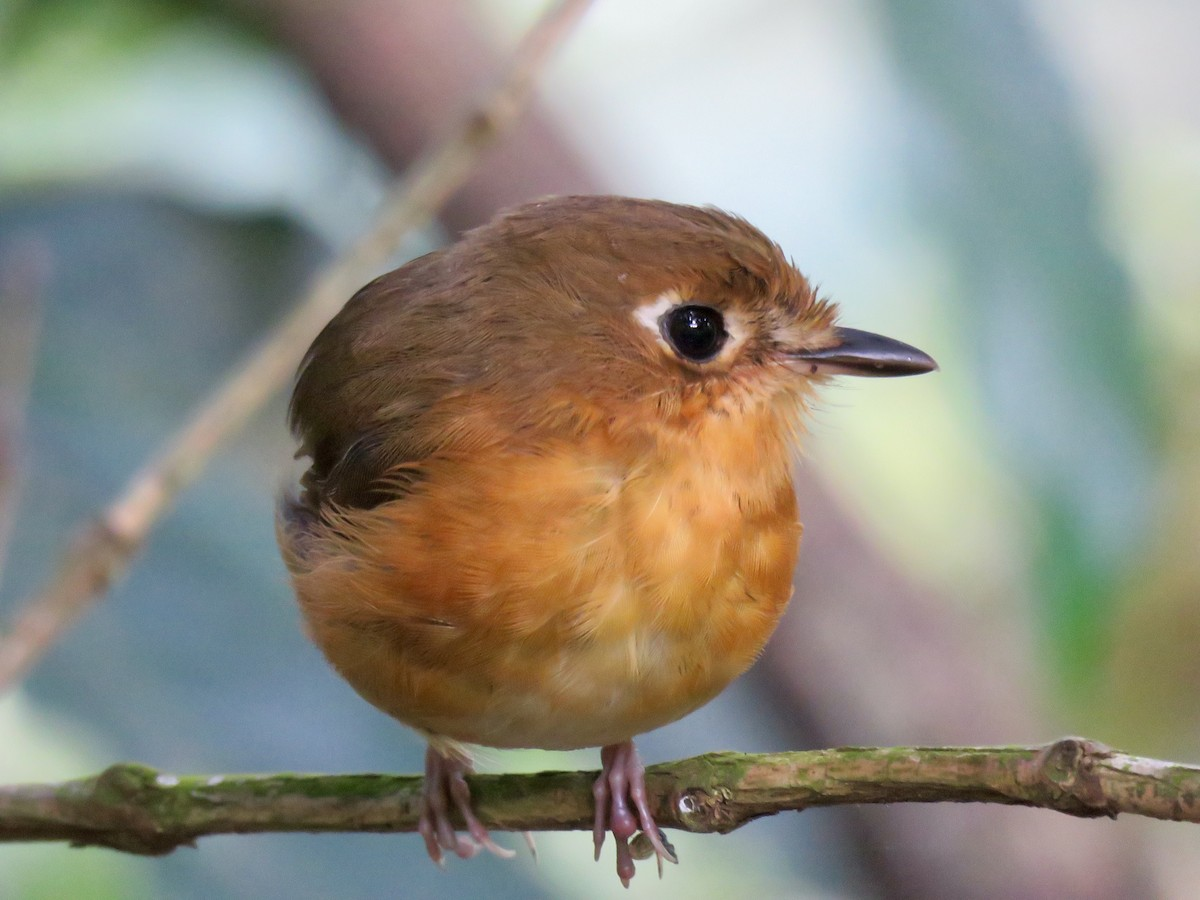

Conservation status
- Least Concern (IUCN 3.1)

Scientific classification
- Kingdom: Animalia
- Phylum: Chordata
- Class: Aves
- Order: Passeriformes
- Family: Grallariidae
- Genus: Grallaricula
- Species: G. ferrugineipectus

Binomial name
- Grallaricula ferrugineipectus (Sclater, PL, 1857)
- Range of G. ferrugineipectus (north) and G. leymebambae (south)

= Rusty-breasted antpitta =

Species of bird

The rusty-breasted antpitta (Grallaricula ferrugineipectus) is a species of bird in the family Grallariidae. It is found in Colombia and Venezuela.

== Taxonomy and systematics ==
The rusty-breasted antpitta has two subspecies, the nominate G. f. ferrugineipectus (Sclater, PL, 1857) and G. f. rara (Hellmayr & Madarász, G, 1914). Subspecies G. f. rara was treated by some authors in the early twentieth century as a separate species. What is now the rufous-breasted antpitta (G. leymebambae) was previously a subspecies of the rusty-breasted but a study published in 2018 showed it to be a full species.

== Description ==
"Grallaricula are very small Andean antpittas, found mostly in low dense vegetation (such as treefall gaps, stream edges, and bamboo thickets)." The rusty-breasted antpitta is about 10 to 12 cm (3.9 to 4.7 in) long; 10 individuals weighed an average of 16.5 g (0.58 oz). The sexes have the same plumage. Adults of the nominate subspecies have a large white or buff spot on their lores and a white or whitish buff arc behind their eye on an otherwise brown face. Their upperparts, wings, and tail are brown with a rufous tinge to the crown. Their throat and breast are rufous-buff or orange-rufous with a white crescent below their breast. Their central belly is white. They have a brown iris, a black bill with a white or pinkish base to the mandible, and pink or dusky gray legs and feet. Subspecies G. f. rara has a rufous chestnut crown and darker underparts than the nominate.

== Distribution and habitat ==
Both subspecies of the rusty-breasted antpitta have disjunct distributions. The nominate subspecies is found in the isolated Sierra Nevada de Santa Marta in northern Colombia, in the Andes in the Venezuelan states of Barinas, Mérida, Trujillo, and Lara, in more northerly mountains in Lara and Yaracuy, and in the Venezuelan Coastal Range east to Miranda. Subspecies G. f. rara is found in the Venezuelan part of the Serranía del Perijá, on the east slope of Colombia's Eastern Andes in Norte de Santander Department, and on the west slope of the Eastern Andes in Cundinamarca Department. (Note that the range map includes G. leymebambae.)

The rusty-breasted antpitta inhabits the undergrowth of humid and semi-humid montane forest. It favors areas with thickets, vine tangles, and bamboo. in elevation it ranges between 700 and 2,000 m (2,300 and 6,600 ft) in Colombia and 250 and 2,200 m (800 and 7,200 ft), though usually above 800 m (2,600 ft), in Venezuela.

== Behavior ==
=== Movement ===
The rusty-breasted antpitta is believed to be resident throughout its range.

=== Feeding ===
The rusty-breasted antpitta's diet is not known in detail but includes insects and spiders. It typically forages alone or in pairs. It hops through thick vegetation, usually within 2 to 3 m (7 to 10 ft) of the ground, gleaning prey from foliage, mossy branches, and from under bark. It sometimes makes short sallies or leaps to take prey and occasionally searches leaf litter on the ground.

=== Breeding ===
The rusty-breasted antpitta's breeding season begins in the rainy season and spans at least April to June and probably beyond. Its nest is a shallow bowl of rootlets, fungal rhizomorphs, and leaf rachides on top of a stick platform. It is built in small bushes or vine tangles up to about 2 m (7 ft) above the ground. The clutch size is two eggs that are generally greenish white with darker markings of any of several colors. The incubation period is 16 to 18 days and fledging occurs 14 to 16 days after hatch. Both sexes incubate the clutch and brood and provision nestlings.

=== Vocalization ===
The rusty-breasted antpitta's song has been described from Colombia as a "series of 6-8 high notes, fading slightly, repeated". From Venezuela it is described as "twa-twa-twa-twa-twa-twa-qwe-qwe-qwe-qwe-qwe-qwe-qwi-qua-qua, with que notes higher pitched and louder". It makes "a sad, liquid quierk" call and in alarm a doubled "quiu-quiu".

== Status ==
The IUCN has assessed the rusty-breasted antpitta as being of Least Concern. It has a large range; its population size is not known and is believed to be stable. No immediate threats have been identified. "It appears that Rusty-breasted Antpitta is fairly tolerant of some degree of forest disturbance, presumably because its preferred habitat is one with natural disturbance colonizers like vines and Chusquea bamboo...This is highly speculative, however, and more work is urgently needed to understand the true habitat requirements of Rusty-breasted Antpittas."
