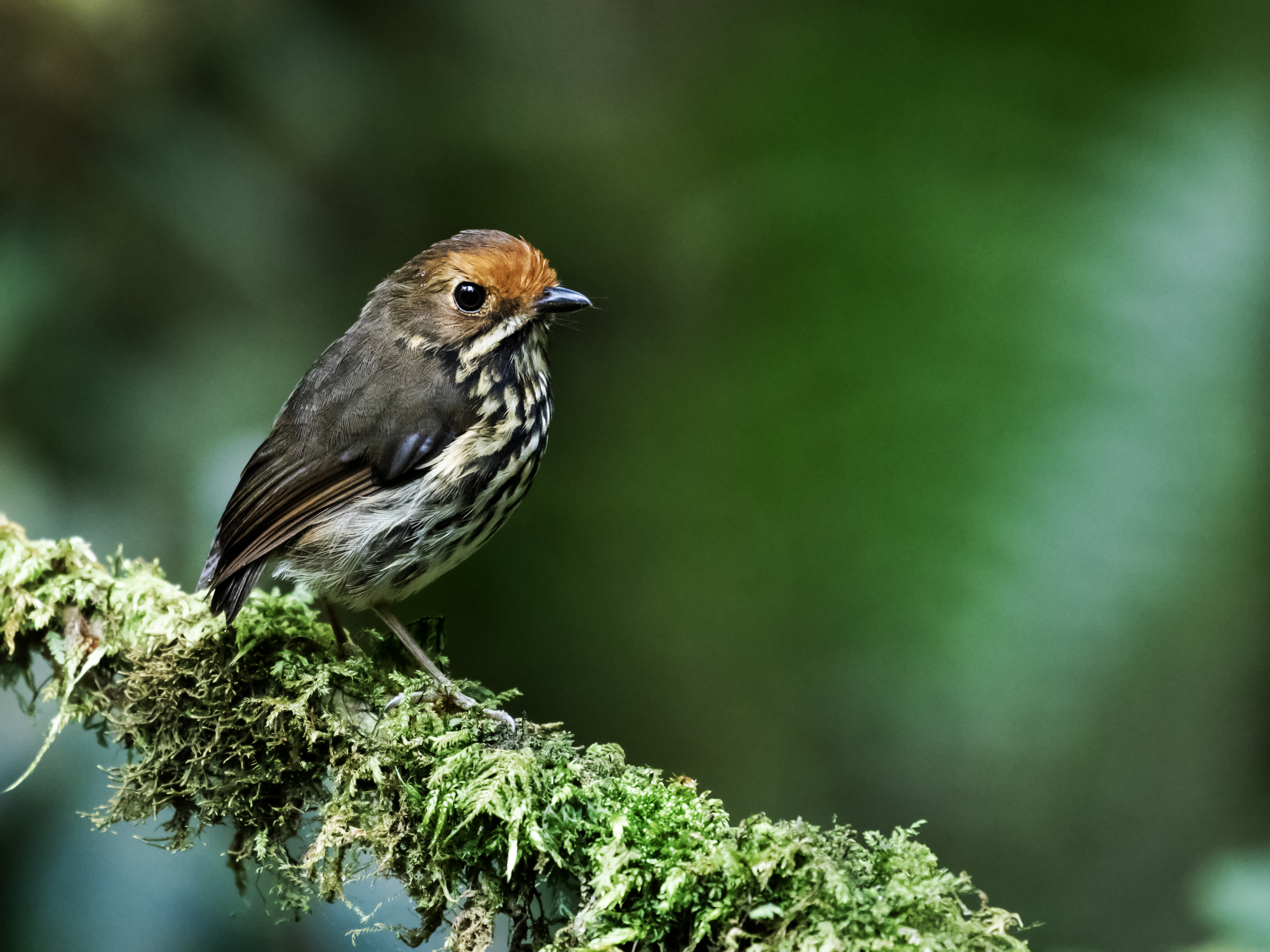

Conservation status
- Vulnerable (IUCN 3.1)

Scientific classification
- Kingdom: Animalia
- Phylum: Chordata
- Class: Aves
- Order: Passeriformes
- Family: Grallariidae
- Genus: Grallaricula
- Species: G. ochraceifrons

Binomial name
- Grallaricula ochraceifrons Graves, O'Neill & Parker, 1983

= Ochre-fronted antpitta =

Species of bird

The ochre-fronted antpitta (Grallaricula ochraceifrons) is a Vulnerable species of bird in the family Grallariidae. It is endemic to Peru.

== Taxonomy and systematics ==
The ochre-fronted antpitta is monotypic. It and the Peruvian antpitta (G. peruviana) probably form a superspecies.

== Description ==
"Grallaricula are very small Andean antpittas, found mostly in low dense vegetation (such as treefall gaps, stream edges, and bamboo thickets)." The ochre-fronted antpitta is about 11.5 to 12 cm (4.5 to 4.7 in) long; four individuals weighed 22.5 to 23.8 g (0.79 to 0.84 oz). Adult males have ochraceous buff lores and eyering and a white or buffy white "moustache" with a black line below it. Their forecrown ("front") is ochraceous buff and their rear crown olive brown. Their upperparts, wings, and tail are olive brown. Their throat is white. Their underparts are mostly white with a buff tinge on the sides and flanks. Their breast has black streaks and their flanks indistinct olive brown streaks. Adult females have an olive brown crown with only a faint ochraceous tinge. Their upperparts, wings, and tail are a darker brown than the male's. Both sexes have a dark brown iris, a black maxilla, a black mandible with a light pink base, and pale grayish pink legs and feet.

== Distribution and habitat ==
The ochre-fronted antpitta is found on the east slope of the Peruvian Andes. It is known from only two sites, "in the Cordillera de Colán, Amazonas, and in Abra Patricia, San Martín". Its range has apparently contracted from historical boundaries. Curiously, its range almost exactly matches that of the long-whiskered owlet (Xenoglaux loweryi), whose type specimen was collected at the same site as that of the antpitta. It is not known if this range match is coincidence or meaningful. The species inhabits the understory of humid montane forest heavy with epiphytes. It occurs in both stunted and tall forest. In elevation it ranges between 1,850 and 2,400 m (6,100 and 7,900 ft).

== Behavior ==
=== Movement ===
The ochre-fronted antpitta is resident throughout its range.

=== Feeding ===
The ochre-fronted antpitta's diet and foraging behavior are not known. It is assumed to feed on arthropods.

=== Breeding ===
Nothing is known about the ochre-fronted antpitta's breeding biology.

=== Vocalization ===
What is believed to be the ochre-fronted antpitta's song is "a single whistled note, given every 6–15 sec: a rising-falling wheeu?". Its call is "a chatter when responding aggressively". Females apparently sing more loudly than males.

== Status ==
The IUCN originally in 1988 assessed the ochre-fronted antpitta as Near Threatened, then in 2000 as Endangered, and since 2022 as Vulnerable. It is known from only two sites within a small overall range and its estimated population of between 1000 and 2500 mature individuals is believed to be decreasing. "The remaining areas of suitable habitat are being cleared for timber, agriculture and to secure ownership of the land." It is considered "[u]ncommon (and local?)". "This species, which is known from only a very small region in the Andes, is particularly at risk due its restricted range. Clearing of forest, primarily for agriculture, is [a] known threat near both of the sites at which Ochre-fronted Antpitta occurs."
