= Grallaricula sp. nov. =

Scientific classification
- Kingdom: Animalia
- Phylum: Chordata
- Class: Aves
- Order: Passeriformes
- Family: Grallariidae
- Genus: Grallaricula
- Species: G. sp. nov.

Binomial name
- Grallaricula sp. nov.

Species of antpitta

The Cali antpitta (Grallaricula sp. nov.) is a undescribed species of antpittas (Grallaricula). It is endemic of the Farallones de Cali.

== History ==
Grallaricula sp. nov. was discovered by a group of researchers from ICESI University and the Pedagogical and Technological University of Colombia on a conservation site managed by the Administrative Department of Environmental Management (DAGMA), who took photographs of the species. Following analyses conducted by the Biology program at ICESI University, it was determined that this was a new species, a finding that was confirmed by subsequent morphological and genetic studies carried out by the National University of Colombia.

Following its discovery, a press conference was held with the participation of Cali City Mayor Maurice Armitage, DAGMA leadership, and the rector of ICESI University, accompanied by Gustavo Londoño, a member of the research team.

The number of individuals of this species is unknown, but studies suggest there are between 5 and 6 individuals.

== Description ==
Grallaricula sp. nov. is a small, short-flying bird measuring no more than eight centimeters, with long legs, a rounded body with brown plumage, and a short tail. Males have a terracotta-colored crown, while females have dark brown plumage on their heads. The only recorded habitat of the species is an area of less than 10 km² in a spring in El Danubio sector of the Farallones de Cali National Natural Park.

On March 6, 2026, an urgent call was made for the protection of the Calin Antpitta after a group of researchers, with support from the Mohamed bin Zayed Species Conservation Fund, conducted an intensive six-month study and found no records of the bird outside of El Danubio, making this species the member of the genus Grallaricula currently at the highest risk of extinction.
