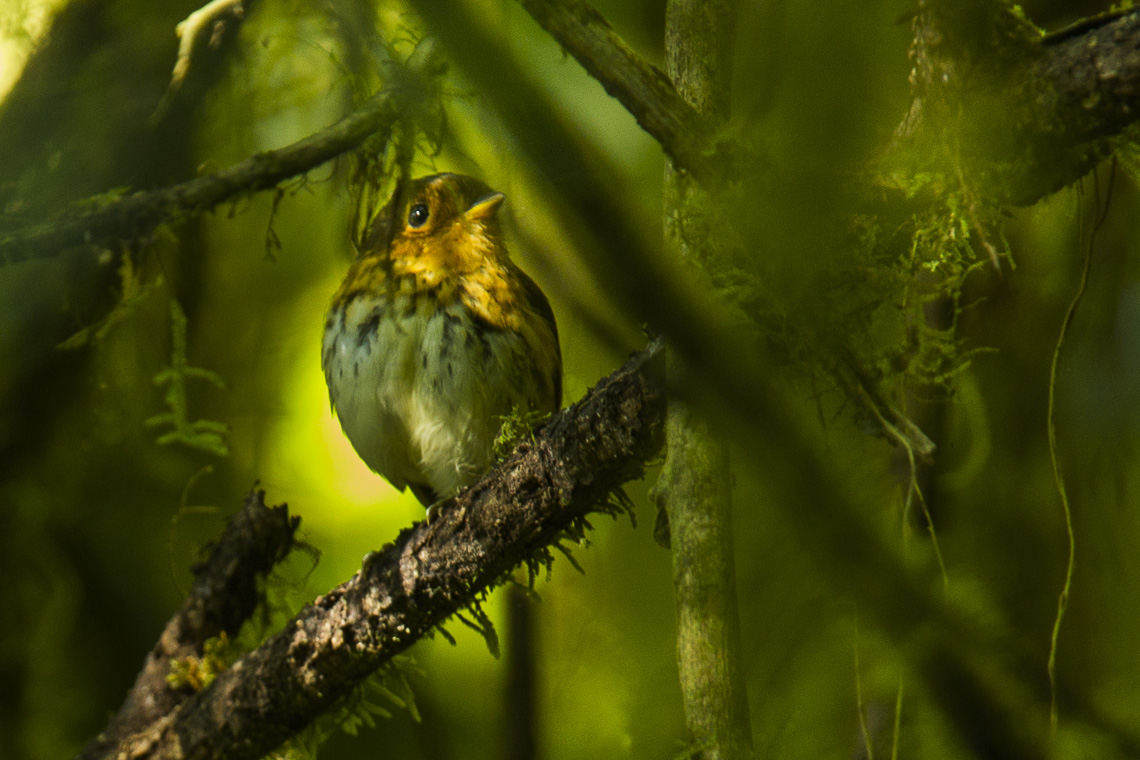
- Ochre-breasted antpitta (Grallaricula flavirostris)

Scientific classification
- Kingdom: Animalia
- Phylum: Chordata
- Class: Aves
- Order: Passeriformes
- Family: Grallariidae
- Genus: Grallaricula; P.L. Sclater, 1858

Type species
- Grallaria flavirostris Sclater, 1858

Species
- 10, see text

= Grallaricula =

Genus of birds

Grallaricula is a genus of bird in the antpitta family Grallariidae.

== Taxonomy ==
The genus Grallaricula was introduced in 1858 by the English zoologist Philip Sclater. He listed several species in the new genus but did not specify the type species. In 1890 Sclater designated the type as Grallaria flavirostris Sclater, the ochre-breasted antpitta. The word Grallaricula is a diminutive of the genus name Grallaria that had been introduced in 1816 by Louis Pierre Vieillot for the antpittas. The word Grallaria is Modern Latin meaning "stilt-walker".

The genus contains the following ten species:

Image	Common name	Scientific name	Distribution
	Ochre-breasted antpitta	Grallaricula flavirostris	Talamancan montane forests and northern Andes
	Rusty-breasted antpitta	Grallaricula ferrugineipectus	northern Andes
	Rufous-breasted antpitta	Grallaricula leymebambae	northern Andes of Peru and Bolivia
-	Scallop-breasted antpitta	Grallaricula loricata	Venezuelan Coastal Range
	Hooded antpitta	Grallaricula cucullata	Colombian Andes
	Peruvian antpitta	Grallaricula peruviana	Cordillera Real (Ecuador) and northern Peru
	Ochre-fronted antpitta	Grallaricula ochraceifrons	Andes of northern Peru
	Slaty-crowned antpitta	Grallaricula nana	northern Andes and eastern tepuis
	Crescent-faced antpitta	Grallaricula lineifrons	Cordillera Real (Ecuador)
	Sucre antpitta	Grallaricula cumanensis	Paria Peninsula in northern Venezuela
-	Cali antpitta	Grallaricula sp. nov.	Farallones de Cali
