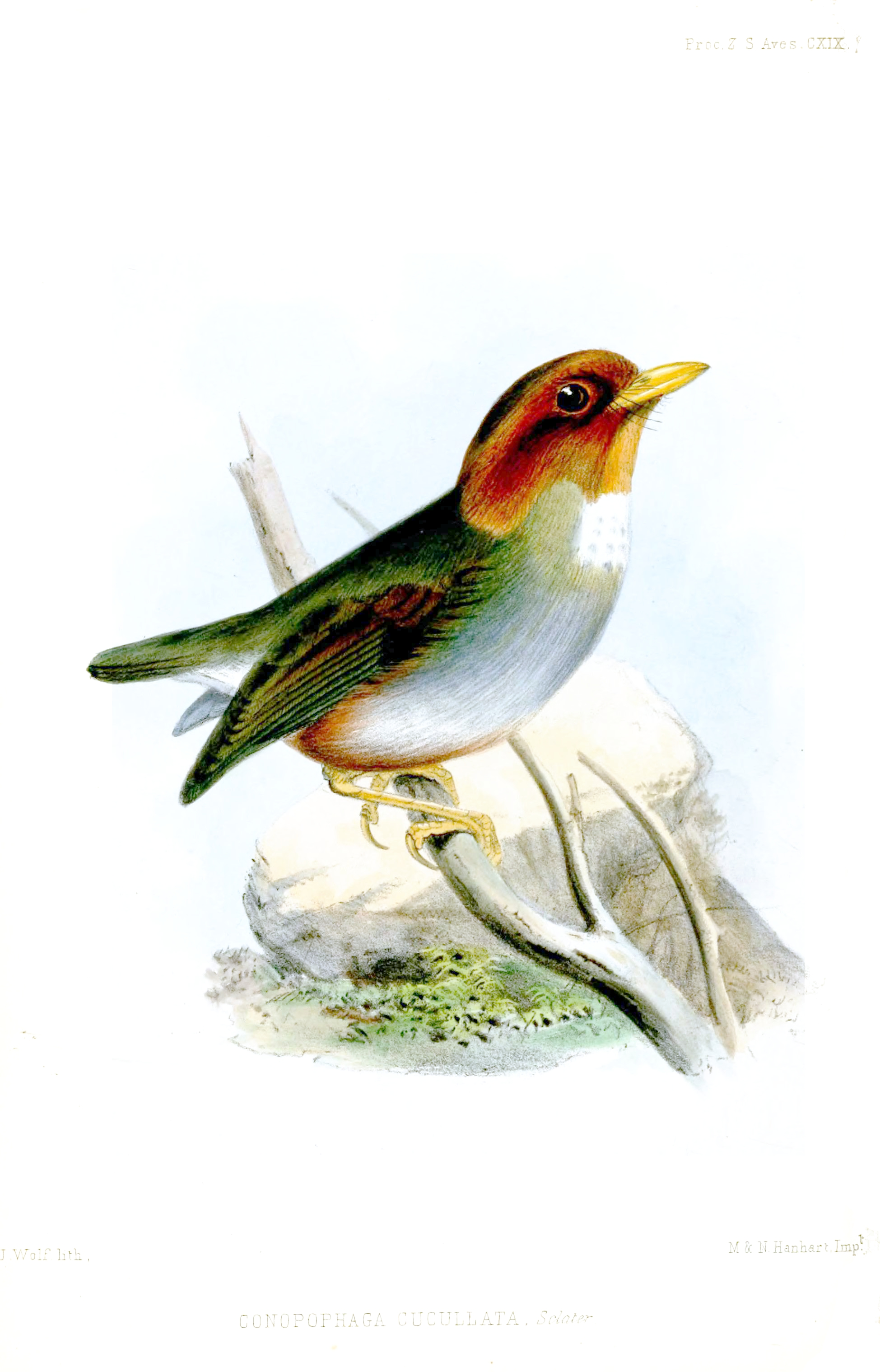
- Illustration by Thomas Wolf, 1856

Conservation status
- Near Threatened (IUCN 3.1)

Scientific classification
- Kingdom: Animalia
- Phylum: Chordata
- Class: Aves
- Order: Passeriformes
- Family: Grallariidae
- Genus: Grallaricula
- Species: G. cucullata

Binomial name
- Grallaricula cucullata (Sclater, PL, 1856)

= Hooded antpitta =

Species of bird

The hooded antpitta (Grallaricula cucullata) is a Near Threatened species of bird in the family Grallariidae. It is found in Colombia and Venezuela.

== Taxonomy and systematics ==
The hooded antpitta was originally described in 1856 as Conopophaga cucullata and was later moved to genus Grallaricula. It has two subspecies, the nominate G. c. cucullata (Sclater, PL, 1856) and G. c. venezuelana (Phelps, WH & Phekps, WH Jr, 1956).

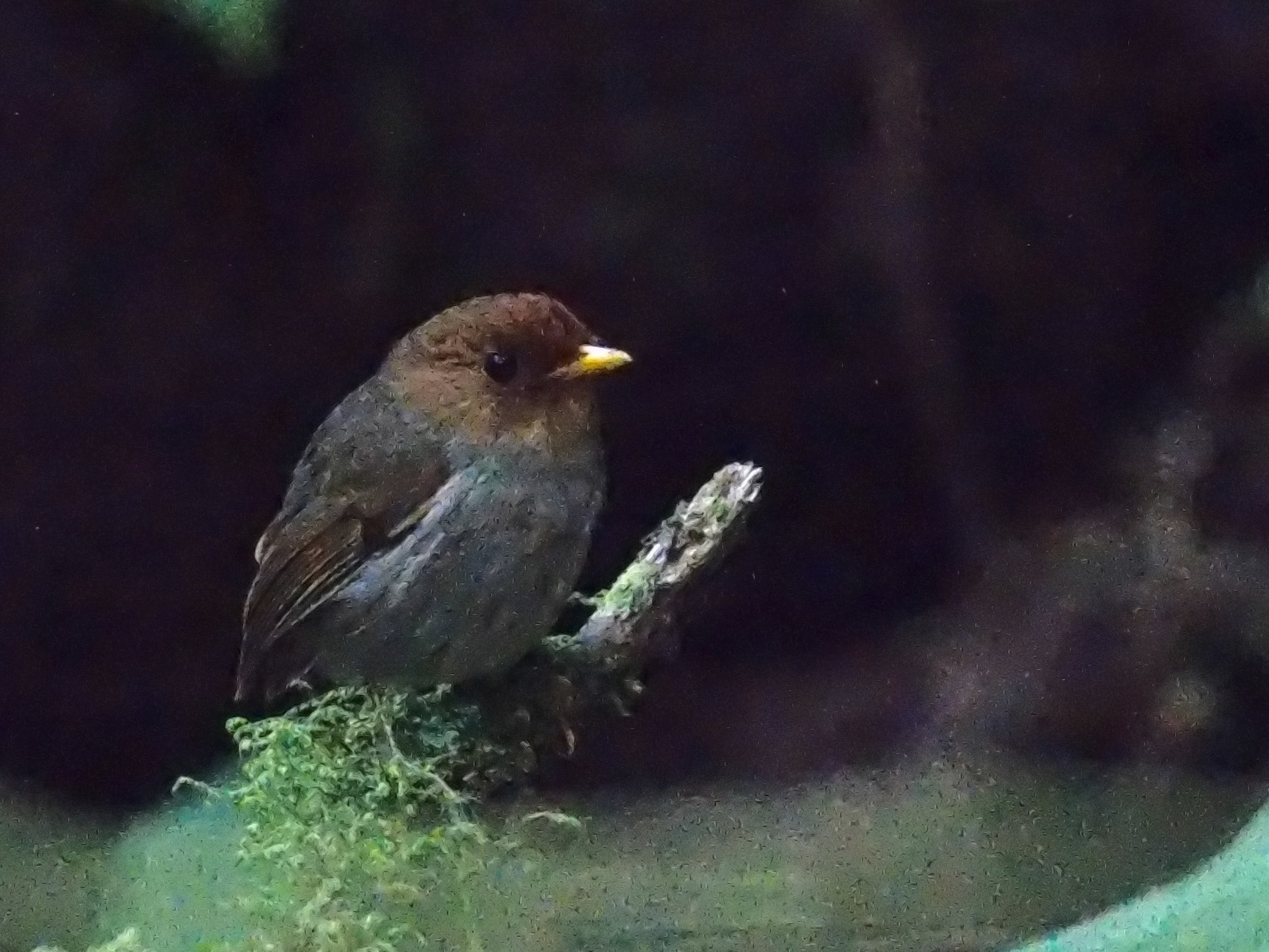
Hooded antpitta

== Description ==
"Grallaricula are very small Andean antpittas, found mostly in low dense vegetation (such as treefall gaps, stream edges, and bamboo thickets)." The hooded antpitta is about 10 to 12 cm (3.9 to 4.7 in) long. The sexes have the same plumage. Adults of the nominate subspecies have a bright orange rufous hood on their entire head, neck, and throat. Their upperparts and tail are olive brown and their wings are a similar but less olive hue. Their upper breast and flanks are pale gray with a thin and indistinct white crescent separating them from the throat. Their lower breast and the center of their belly are white. Subspecies G. c. venezuelana is similar to the nominate but its wings and tail have a reddish tinge, its breast has a strong olivaceous wash, and its lower belly and undertail coverts are pale cream or yellowish instead of white. Both subspecies have a dark brown iris, a pale yellowish to orange-pinkish bill, and gray to bluish slate legs and feet.

== Distribution and habitat ==
"The range of Hooded Antpitta is patchy and poorly known, with large gaps between known populations, though new localities still being discovered." The nominate subspecies is found in Colombia, in the Western Andes of Valle del Cauca and Cauca departments, on the west slope of the Central Andes in Valle del Cauca and Antioquia departments, and on the west slope of the Eastern Andes at the head of the Magdalena River Valley in Huila Department and possibly further north as well. There are also nineteenth century records near Medellín in Antioquia. Subspecies G. c. venezuelana is found on the east slope of Colombia's Eastern Andes in eastern Cundinamarca Department and slightly into the northwestern Venezuelan states of Táchira and Apure. The species inhabits the undergrowth of humid subtropical montane forest. In elevation it occurs between 1,500 and 2,800 m (4,900 and 9,200 ft) in Colombia and between 1,500 and 2,550 m (4,900 and 8,400 ft) in Venezuela.

== Behavior ==
=== Movement ===
The hooded antpitta is resident throughout its range.

=== Feeding ===
The hooded antpitta's diet is not known in detail but includes insects; it is assumed to also eat other invertebrates. It apparently forages in low vegetation but rarely on the ground.

=== Breeding ===
Nothing is known about the hooded antpitta's breeding biology beyond that a female specimen collected in September had a fully shelled egg inside.

=== Vocalization ===
The hooded antpitta's song has been described as "8-10 high notes, rising then falling". Another vocalization was reported as "a di- or trisyllabic, high-pitched but quite liquid call, repeated 2-3 times".

== Status ==
The IUCN originally in 1988 assessed the hooded antpitta as Threatened, then in 1994 as Vulnerable, and since 2022 as Near Threatened. It has a restricted and fragmented range and its estimated population of between 10,000 and 20,000 mature individuals is believed to be decreasing. "The species is threatened by the conversion of its forested habitat as a consequence of human settlement, logging and expansion of agricultural land. In many areas, including Medellín and the upper Magdalena valley in Colombia, large areas of forest have already been cleared. Human development of land continues, generally following the construction of new roads, and even affects national parks, including Tatamá and El Tamá". It is "uncommon and hard to observe" in Colombia and "[p]erhaps rare and local but probably also overlooked" in Venezuela.
