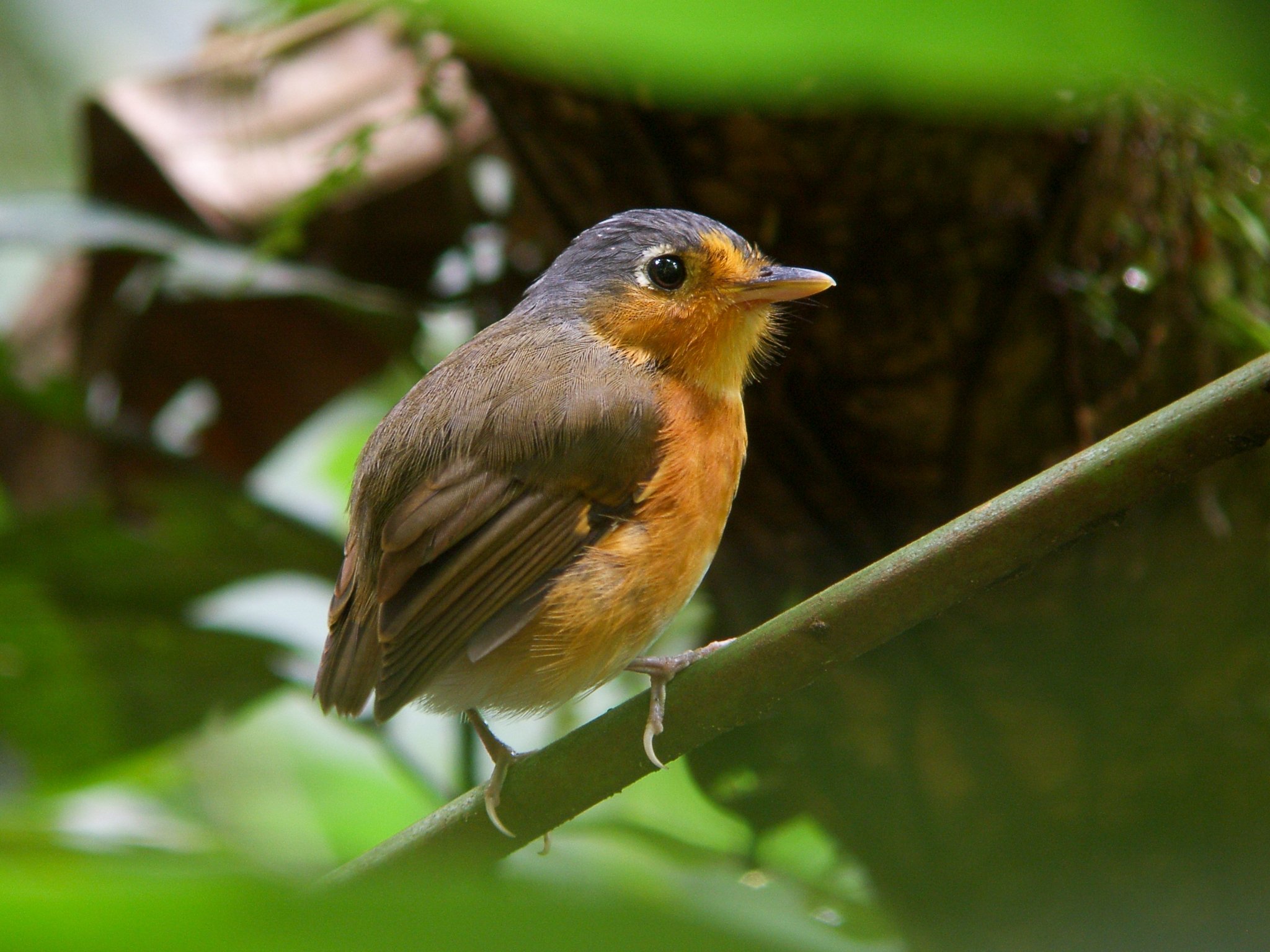

Conservation status
- Vulnerable (IUCN 3.1)

Scientific classification
- Kingdom: Animalia
- Phylum: Chordata
- Class: Aves
- Order: Passeriformes
- Family: Grallariidae
- Genus: Grallaricula
- Species: G. cumanensis

Binomial name
- Grallaricula cumanensis Hartert, 1900

= Sucre antpitta =

Species of bird

The Sucre antpitta (Grallaricula cumanensis) is a Vulnerable species of bird in the family Grallariidae.It is endemic to Venezuela.

== Taxonomy and systematics ==
The Sucre antpitta has two subspecies, the nominate G. c. cumanensis (Hartert, 1900) and G. c. pariae (Phelps, WH & Phelps, HW Jr, 1949). Both were originally treated as subspecies of the slaty-crowned antpitta (G. nana). A study published in 2008 prompted taxonomic systems to elevate them to their current status.

== Description ==
"Grallaricula are very small Andean antpittas, found mostly in low dense vegetation (such as treefall gaps, stream edges, and bamboo thickets)." The Sucre antpitta is about 10 to 11 cm (3.9 to 4.3 in) long. The sexes have the same plumage. Adults of the nominate subspecies have an orange rufous loral spot and a buffy to buffy-rufous eyering. Their crown and nape are dark slaty gray. Their upperparts and tail are dark olive brown and their wings slightly browner with thin buff edges on the primaries. Their ear coverts, sides of their neck, and their throat are bright rufous orange. Their lower throat and upper chest have a thin white or rufous-washed white band with a wide band of rufous orange across their chest. That color continues along the sides of their chest and their flanks. The center of their chest and their belly are white. Subspecies G. c. pariae has a somewhat purer olive brown upperparts than the nominate but is otherwise the same. Both subspecies have a brown iris, a black bill with a whitish or pale base to the mandible, and gray legs and feet.

== Distribution and habitat ==
The Sucre antpitta has a disjunct distribution. The nominate subspecies is found in the Venezuelan Coastal Range in Anzoátegui, western Sucre and northern Monagas states. Subspecies G. c. pariae is found on Cerro Humo, Cerro Azul, and other mountains on the Paria Peninsula in Sucre. It inhabits the understory of humid montane forest heavy with epiphytes and mosses. In elevation it ranges between 600 and 1,850 m (2,000 and 6,100 ft).

== Behavior ==
=== Movement ===
The Sucre antpitta is resident throughout its range.

=== Feeding ===
The Sucre antpitta's diet has not been detailed but is assumed to be primarily small invertebrates. Its foraging behavior is also unknown but the species is assumed to forage mostly in vegetation near the ground and only occasionally on the ground.

=== Breeding ===
The Sucre antpitta's breeding season has not been defined but is known to include May. Its nest is a shallow cup of grass built near the ground. The three known clutches were each of two eggs. Nothing else is known about the species' breeding biology.

=== Vocalization ===
The Sucre antpitta's song is a "trilled series of mellow notes which initially rises in pitch and may again fall in pitch towards the end" and may extend to 30 notes. Its principal call is a "short, stuttered series of 5‒6 typically raspy notes...Krree-krre-krre-krre-krr". The species is most vocal in the morning and late afternoon. It typically sings from a low perch.

== Status ==
The IUCN has assessed the Sucre antpitta as Vulnerable. It has a small range and its estimated population of between 12,000 and 54,000 mature individuals is believed to be decreasing. "There has been widespread clearance for agriculture in the Turimiquire Massif and the Paria Peninsula and both regions are considered highly threatened." Even areas within nominally protected Cueva del Guácharo National Park are cut and burned." "The extent to which the Sucre Antpitta tolerates disturbance is unknown, but large-scale clearing and burning is undoubtedly detrimental."
