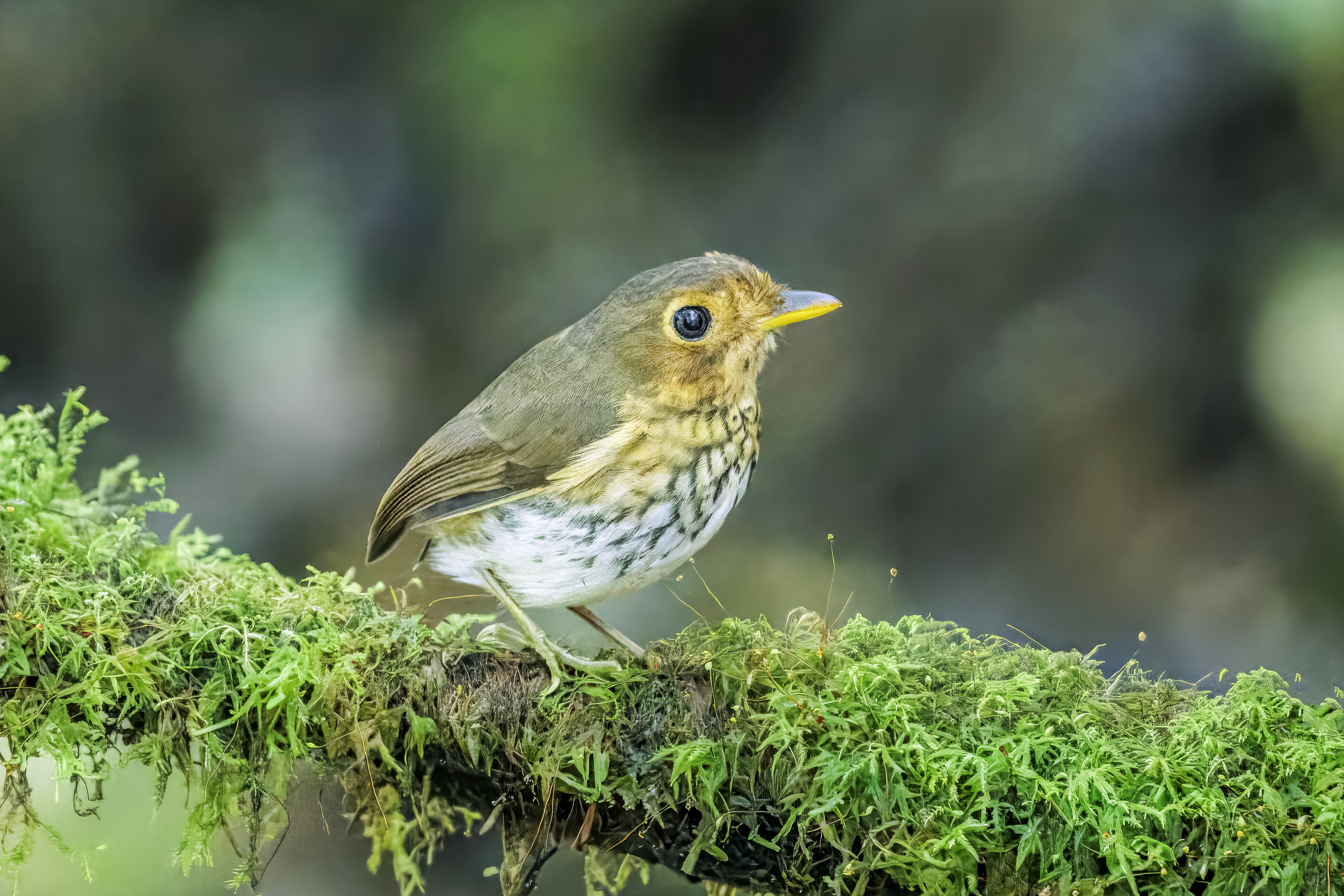
- G. f. mindoensis Refugio Paz de Las Aves; Nanegalito, Ecuador

Conservation status
- Least Concern (IUCN 3.1)

Scientific classification
- Kingdom: Animalia
- Phylum: Chordata
- Class: Aves
- Order: Passeriformes
- Family: Grallariidae
- Genus: Grallaricula
- Species: G. flavirostris

Binomial name
- Grallaricula flavirostris (Sclater, PL, 1858)

= Ochre-breasted antpitta =

Species of bird

The ochre-breasted antpitta (Grallaricula flavirostris) is a species of bird in the family Grallariidae. It is found in Bolivia, Colombia, Costa Rica, Ecuador, Panama, and Peru.

== Taxonomy and systematics ==
The ochre-breasted antpitta has these eight subspecies:

- G. f. costaricensis Lawrence, 1866
- G. f. brevis Nelson, 1912
- G. f. ochraceiventris Chapman, 1922
- G. f. mindoensis Chapman, 1925
- G. f. zarumae Chapman, 1922
- G. f. flavirostris (Sclater, PL, 1858)
- G. f. similis Carriker, 1933
- G. f. boliviana Chapman, 1919

Some authors have treated subspecies G. f. similis and G. f. boliviana together as a separate species.

== Description ==
"Grallaricula are very small Andean antpittas, found mostly in low dense vegetation (such as treefall gaps, stream edges, and bamboo thickets)." The ochre-breasted antpitta is about 10 cm (3.9 in) long and weighs 14 to 18 g (0.49 to 0.63 oz). The sexes have the same plumage. Adults of the nominate subspecies G. f. flavirostris have ochraceous lores, an ochraceous eyering, and a black malar stripe on a somewhat darker ochraceous face. Their upperparts are olive-brown with a light gray wash on their crown. Their wings are olive-brown with rufescent brown edges on the flight feathers. Their throat and breast are ochraceous with olive-brown streaks or scallops on the breast. Their flanks are tawny, sometimes with some short dusky streaks. Their belly and crissum are white. They have a dark brown iris, a blackish bill with a pinkish gray base to the mandible, and pinkish gray legs and feet.

The other subspecies of the ochre-breasted antpitta differ from the nominate and each other thus:

- G. f. costaricensis: similar to nominate with fewer dusky marks on the underparts
- G. f. brevis: more olivaceous and a grayer crown than nominate, with fewer dusky marks on the underparts
- G. f. ochraceiventris, G. f. mindoensis, and G. f. zarumae: almost alike but underparts all highly variable, with almost plain to heavily streaked breast, white or light ochraceous belly, and all yellow bill or dark maxilla and yellow mandible
- G. f. similis wide buff eyering, buff and blackish malar stripe, brown upperparts with an olive wash and darker crown and nape, buff throat with blackish streaks and white crescent below it, buff breast heavy with darker V-shaped scallops, white belly, and buff-brown flanks with black scallops
- G. f. boliviana: wide buff eyering, buff and blackish malar stripe, brown upperparts with gray-tinged crown, buff throat with blackish streaks and white crescent below it, buff breast with darker V-shaped scallops (less heavily than similis), white belly, and buff-brown flanks with black scallops

== Distribution and habitat ==
The ochre-breasted antpitta has a disjunct distribution; few of the subspecies' ranges are contiguous. They are found thus:

- G. f. costaricensis: Caribbean slope in Costa Rica from central Alajuela Province south, Pacific slope of Costa Rica from central San José Province south, and into western Panama as far as Veraguas Province
- G. f. brevis: eastern Darién Province in eastern Panama
- G. f. ochraceiventris: Colombia's Western Andes; isolated populations in the northern Central Andes and Serranía de los Yariguíes on the west slope of the Eastern Andes might be this subspecies
- G. f. mindoensis: from southwestern Colombia's Nariño Department into northwestern Ecuador to Esmeraldas and Pinchincha provinces
- G. f. zarumae: El Oro and western Azuay provinces in southwestern Ecuador
- G. f. flavirostris: Amazonian slope of the Andes from Colombia through Ecuador and possibly into extreme northern Peru
- G. f. similis: Peru from the Marañón River south to Pasco Department and possibly beyond
- G. f. boliviana: from Pasco in central Peru southeast to Puno Department and into central Bolivia as far as Cochabamba Department

The ochre-breasted antpitta inhabits the undergrowth of humid to wet montane forest in the foothill and subtropical zones. In elevation it occurs overall mostly between 900 and 2,200 m (3,000 and 7,200 ft). In Costa Rica's Caribbean slope it occurs between 700 and 1,500 m (2,300 and 4,900 ft) and on the Pacific slope between 900 and 1,800 m (3,000 and 5,900 ft). In Colombia it occurs between 500 and 2,000 m (1,600 and 6,600 ft), in Ecuador mostly between 800 and 2,000 m (2,600 and 6,600 ft) but locally lower in the southwest, and in Peru between 1,300 and 2,300 m (4,300 and 7,500 ft) and locally down to 800 m (2,600 ft).

== Behavior ==
=== Movement ===
The ochre-breasted antpitta is believed to be resident throughout its range.

=== Feeding ===
The ochre-breasted antpitta's diet is not known in detail but includes insects. It typically forages alone or in pairs and does not join mixed-species feeding flocks. It hops through thick vegetation, usually within about 1 m (3 ft) of the ground and dropping to it, but seldom spending time on the ground. It also makes short sallies to foliage and trunks.

=== Breeding ===
The ochre-breasted antpitta's breeding season has not been defined but in northwestern Ecuador includes August. One nest was a cup of moss lined with fungal rhizomorphs 3.1 m (10 ft) high in a medium-size tree. The usual clutch size is one or two eggs. The incubation period is 17 to 21 days and fledging is estimated to occur between 14 and 16 days after hatch. Details of parental care are not known.

=== Vocalization ===
The ochre-breasted antpitta's song is seldom heard; it appears to vary somewhat among the subspecies but details are lacking. It is described in general terms as "an evenly paced series of c. 30 notes, over first half rising in volume and in pitch...then steady". In Costa Rica it is described as "a high trill with a rattling quality". In Ecuador one song is "a simple 'weeeu' repeated steadily at 8- to 10-second intervals. In El Oro it also sings "a rapid series of piping notes on an even pitch". The Peruvian population makes "a single whistled note given about every 10-20 seconds, occasionally faster" with the notes varying among "a descending tew", a longer "teew", and "a rising-falling wheew".

== Status ==
The IUCN originally in 2004 assessed the ochre-breasted antpitta as being of Least Concern, then in 2012 as Near Threatened, and since 2022 again as of Least Concern. It has a very large range; its population size is not known and is believed to be decreasing. "Due to its dependence on humid and wet forests, deforestation is the primary threat affecting this species, particularly towards the lower portion of its altitudinal range. The main driver of forest loss is clearance for timber, agriculture and to establish land ownership rights." It is considered rare in Costa Rica, uncommon in Colombia, "uncommon and apparently local" in Ecuador, and "uncommon to fairly common" in Peru. It is secretive and "probably overlooked". It occurs in several protected areas.
