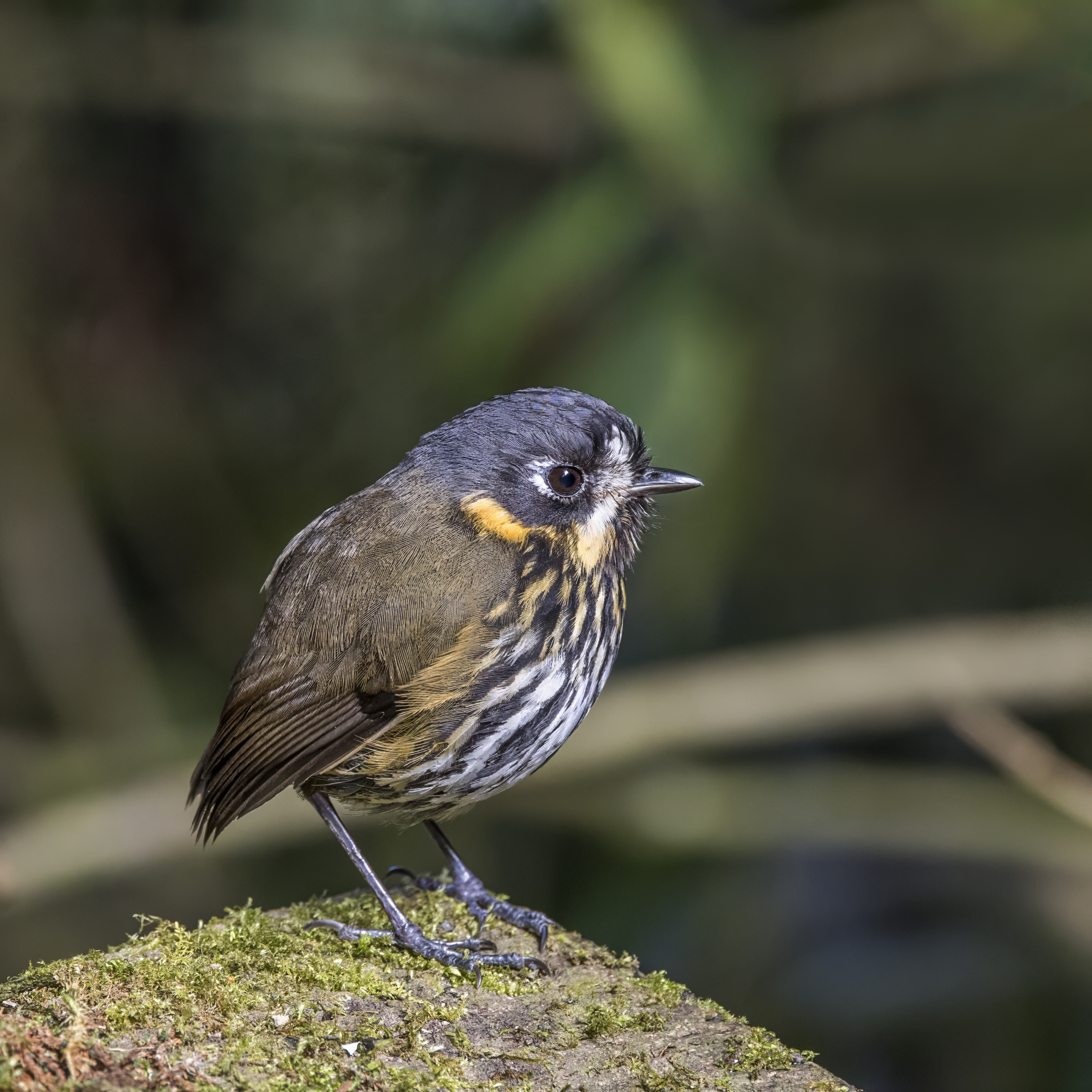
- In Colombia

Conservation status
- Least Concern (IUCN 3.1)

Scientific classification
- Kingdom: Animalia
- Phylum: Chordata
- Class: Aves
- Order: Passeriformes
- Family: Grallariidae
- Genus: Grallaricula
- Species: G. lineifrons

Binomial name
- Grallaricula lineifrons (Chapman, 1924)

Synonyms
- Apocryptornis lineifrons Chapman, 1924

= Crescent-faced antpitta =

Species of bird

The crescent-faced antpitta (Grallaricula lineifrons) is a species of bird in the family Grallariidae. It is found in Colombia and Ecuador.

== Taxonomy and systematics ==
The crescent-faced antpitta was originally described as Apocryptornis lineifrons but was soon moved to genus Grallaricula. It is monotypic.

== Description ==
"Grallaricula are very small Andean antpittas, found mostly in low dense vegetation (such as treefall gaps, stream edges, and bamboo thickets)." The crescent-faced antpitta is 11 to 12 cm (4.3 to 4.7 in) long and weighs 17 to 22 g (0.60 to 0.78 oz). The sexes have the same plumage. Adults have the eponymous white crescent from the crown through the lores and almost to the throat and a small white spot behind the eye. Their crown and nape are dark sooty gray and their face black. The crescent's bottom becomes ochraceous buff and they have a spot of that color on the side of their neck. Their upperparts are brownish olive. Their wings and tail are browner than their back with whitish or light yellow-buff on the leading edge of the outermost primary. The center of their chin and upper throat are white with black stripes between them and the crescent. Their underparts are mostly white with a strong ochraceous buff wash and black stripes. Their sides and flanks are dull brownish olive with an ochraceous buff wash and faint dark gray stripes. Their undertail coverts are ochraceous buff. Both sexes have a dark brown iris, a black bill, and vinaceous gray to blue-gray legs and feet.

== Distribution and habitat ==
The crescent-face antpitta is found in scattered locations in Colombia's Central Andes from Quindío Department south on the eastern Andean slope to Loja Province in southern Ecuador. It inhabits the undergrowth of humid forest, both cloudforest and elfin forest near but not past treeline. It does not appear to be as closely associated with bamboo as many other Grallaricula antpittas. Though earlier publications gave a lower elevation limit of 1,800 m (5,900 ft), more recent and more detailed studies show it occurs almost entirely above 2,900 m (9,500 ft). It reaches at least 3,700 m (12,100 ft) in Colombia and 3,500 m (11,500 ft) in Ecuador.

== Behavior ==
=== Migration ===
The crescent-faced antpitta is resident throughout its range.

=== Feeding ===
The crescent-faced antpitta is one of several antpittas that regularly come to feeding stations set up to view them. There they are fed earthworms, which are thought to also be a large part of their natural diet. In the wild they also feed on insects, spiders, and other arthropods, though details are lacking. It typically forages singly or in pairs, hopping through dense foliage and much less frequently on the ground. It gleans prey from foliage from a perch or by short reaches and sallies, and captures prey from leaf litter on the ground.

=== Breeding ===
The crescent-faced antpitta's breeding season in Ecuador apparently spans from November to April. Its nest is usually a shallow cup of moss and twigs on a platform of moss and sticks and lined with rootlets and other flexible fibers. Some are built on a tuft of moss or on another bird's old nest rather than a platform. They are supported by small branches, vines, or a clump of moss or epiphytes. Nests have been noted between 1.8 and 3.6 m (6 and 12 ft) above the ground. Both sexes build the nest and provision nestlings. The clutch size, incubation period, time to fledging, and other details of parental care are not known.

=== Vocalization ===
What appears to be the crescent-faced antpitta's primary song is "an ascending series of piping notes, [the] last several rather shrill, e.g., pu-pu-pu-pe-pe-pee-pee-pi-pi-pi?". Other vocalizations include "a soft, downslurred whistle" and a "Chup!". The species is seldom heard or seen unless prompted with a recording. When seen singing it is usually on a low perch in dense vegetation.

== Status ==
The IUCN originally in 1988 assessed the crescent-faced antpitta as Threatened, then in 2004 as Near Threatened, and since 2019 as being of Least Concern. It has a large overall range; its population size is not known and is believed to be stable. "Agricultural expansion has led to widespread and severe deforestation of montane forest within the species's range. Remaining forests are degraded as a consequence of timber extraction for charcoal production...Nevertheless, the species may tolerate patchy, degraded forests and secondary growth, and therefore is less at risk than feared." It occurs in several nominally protected areas in both countries but those in Ecuador are subject to illegal cutting and burning for pasture.
