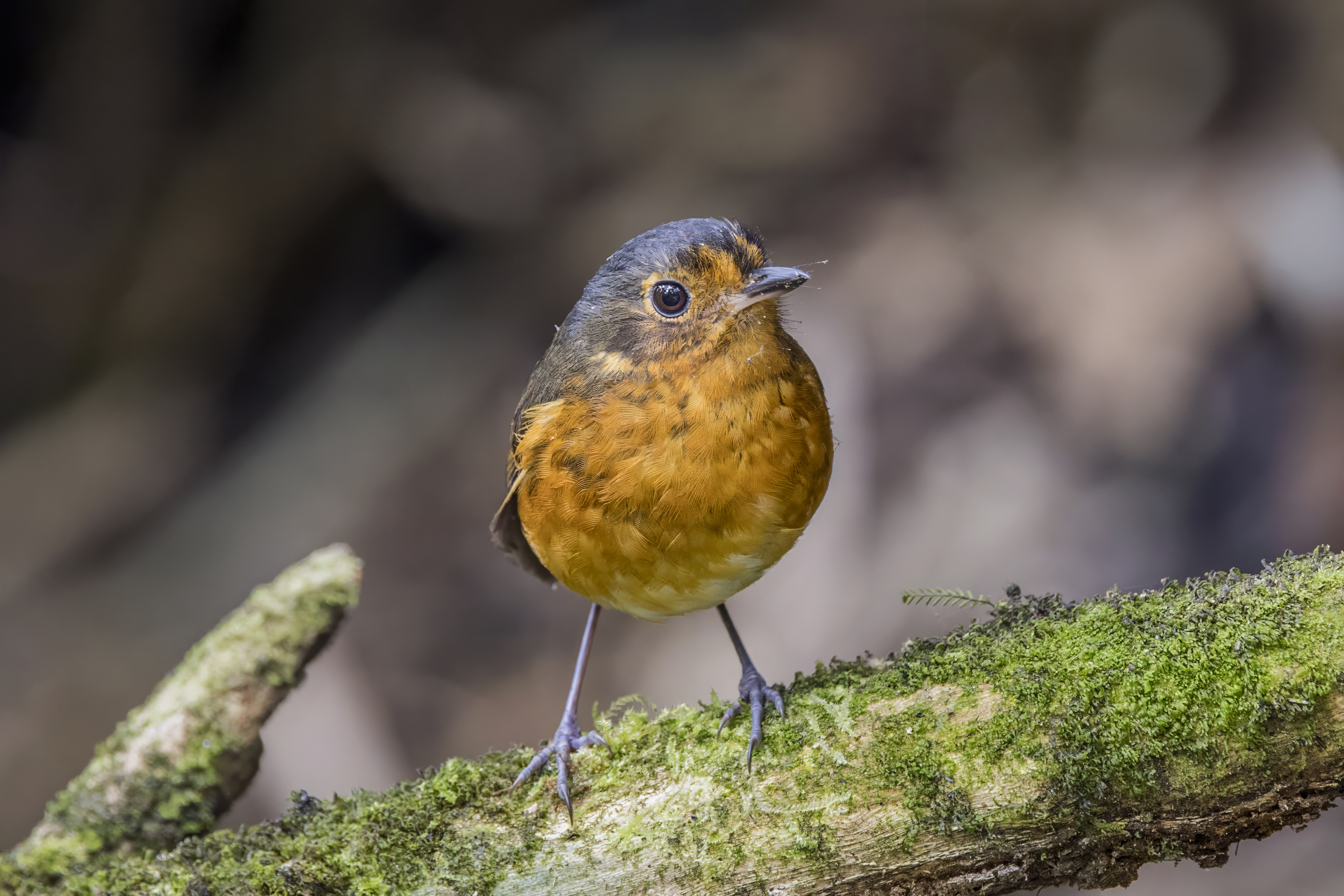
- G. n. occidentalis, Colombia

Conservation status
- Least Concern (IUCN 3.1)

Scientific classification
- Kingdom: Animalia
- Phylum: Chordata
- Class: Aves
- Order: Passeriformes
- Family: Grallariidae
- Genus: Grallaricula
- Species: G. nana

Binomial name
- Grallaricula nana (Lafresnaye, 1842)

= Slaty-crowned antpitta =

Species of bird

The slaty-crowned antpitta or slate-crowned antpitta (Grallaricula nana) is a species of bird in the family Grallariidae. It is found in Brazil, Colombia, Ecuador, Guyana, Peru, and Venezuela.

== Taxonomy and systematics ==
The taxonomic divisions and subspecific range limits of slaty-crowned Antpitta are far from resolved. As of 2024 the slaty-crowned antpitta has these six subspecies assigned:

- G. n. occidentalis Todd, 1927
- G. n. nana (Lafresnaye, 1842)
- G. n. hallsi Donegan, 2008
- G. n. nanitaea Donegan, 2008
- G. n. olivascens Hellmayr, 1917
- G. n. kukenamensis Chubb, C, 1918

What are now the two subspecies of the Sucre antpitta (G. cumanensis) were previously treated as subspecies of the slaty-crowned. Some authors have suggested that G. n. kukenamensis should be treated as a full species but this suggestion has not gained wide support. The Clements taxonomy does note it within the species as the "Slate-crowned Antpitta (Guianan)" distinguished from the other five subspecies grouped as the "Slate-crowned Antpitta (Slate-crowned)".

== Description ==
"Grallaricula are very small Andean antpittas, found mostly in low dense vegetation (such as treefall gaps, stream edges, and bamboo thickets)." The slaty-crowned antpitta is 10.5 to 11.5 cm (4.1 to 4.5 in) long and weighs 17.5 to 23 g (0.62 to 0.81 oz). The sexes have the same plumage. Adult males of the nominate subspecies G. n. nana have an orange rufous loral spot and eyering on an otherwise olive brown face. Their crown is dark slaty gray. Their upperparts and tail are dark olive brown and their wings dark tawny brown. Their underparts are mostly orange rufous with a white crescent across their lower throat and a white center to their belly.

The other subspecies of the slaty-crowned antpitta differ from the nominate and each other thus:

- G. n. occidentalis: paler underparts than nominate
- G. n. hallsi: more olivaceous back and paler, more orange, underparts than nominate
- G. n. nanitaea: more olivaceous back and paler breast than nominate
- G. n. olivascens: paler than nominate with a more greenish olive back
- G. n. kukenamensis: ash gray crown, paler and ochraceous brown upperparts and paler underparts than nominate

All subspecies have a brown iris, a black bill with a white or pinkish base to the mandible, and gray legs and feet.

== Distribution and habitat ==
As noted above, the ranges of the slaty-crowned antpitta's subspecies have not been completely resolved. The species has a highly disjunct distribution. As is best known as of late 2023, the subspecies are found thus:

- G. n. occidentalis: Colombia's Central and Western Andes and south on the eastern Andean slope through Ecuador into Peru to the Marañón River in the Department of Cajamarca
- G. n. nana: Colombia's Eastern Andes
- G. n. hallsi: Serranía de los Yariguíes in northeastern Colombia's Santander Department
- G. n. nanitaea: northwestern Venezuela's Sierra Nevada de Mérida from Trujillo state to Táchira state
- G. n. olivascens: the Venezuelan Coastal Range in Aragua state and the Capital District
- G. n. kukenamensis: the tepui region in Venezuela's Gran Sabana state and the vicinity of Mount Roraima in western Guyana

Though none of the above sources note it, the South American Classification Committee of the American Ornithological Society has records in Brazil that can be attributed to G. n. kukenamensis.

The slaty-crowned antpitta inhabits montane forest in the subtropical to temperate zone, almost always in and near dense stands of Chusquea bamboo. In elevation it ranges between 2,200 and 2,900 m (7,200 and 9,500 ft) in Peru, between 2,000 and 2,900 m (6,600 and 9,500 ft) in Ecuador, between 2,000 and 3,300 m (6,600 and 10,800 ft) in Colombia, and between 700 and 2,800 m (2,300 and 9,200 ft) in Venezuela.

== Behavior ==
=== Movement ===
The slaty-crowned antpitta is resident throughout its range.

=== Feeding ===
The slaty-crowned antpitta's diet has not been detailed but is known to include insects, other arthropods, and earthworms. It typically forages singly or in pairs, hopping through dense foliage and on the ground. It gleans prey from foliage from a perch or by short reaches and sallies, and captures prey from leaf litter on the ground. It has been seen attending swarms of Labidus army ants. It apparently rarely joins mixed-species feeding flocks.

=== Breeding ===
Most of the data for the slaty-crowned antpitta's breeding biology are from subspecies G. n. occidentalis in Ecuador. The species' breeding season there includes at least September to November. Its nest is a shallow cup of leaves (whole and partial) on a platform of sticks and lined with rootlets and other flexible fibers. They are typically placed on the base of bamboo leaves, on thin branches, or in vine tangles, and almost always in or very near stands of bamboo. The only height measurements placed two nests 2 and 2.4 m (7 and 8 ft) above the ground. The usual clutch size appears to be one egg; it is pale brown or beige with dark markings. The incubation period and time to fledging are not known. Both parents build the nest, incubate the egg, and brood and provision nestlings.

=== Vocalization ===
The slaty-crowned antpitta's song differs slightly among the subspecies. It has been written as "pee-pee-PEE-pee-pee-pee-pee-pee" (Peru), "we-e-e-e-e-e-e-e-e-e-e-e-ew" (Ecuador), "we'ti'ti'ti'ti'ti'te'tee'too" (Colombia), and "we'e'e'ti'ti'ti'ti'ti'ti'ti'ti'ti'ti'te'te'te'e'e'e" (Venezuela). Descriptions of its call include "a descending "tew" note" and "a short and abrupt 'tchew' ".

== Status ==
The IUCN has assessed the slaty-crowned antpitta as being of Least Concern. It has a very large range; its population size is not known and is believed to be stable. No immediate threats have been identified. It is considered fairly common in Peru and Colombia and fairly common to common in Venezuela. It "appears that the Slate-crowned Antpitta can tolerate some degree of human-alteration of their habitat". It is "linked to somewhat naturally disturbed areas, especially dense secondary growth and bamboo stands, but are still reliant on 'good' forest coverage".
