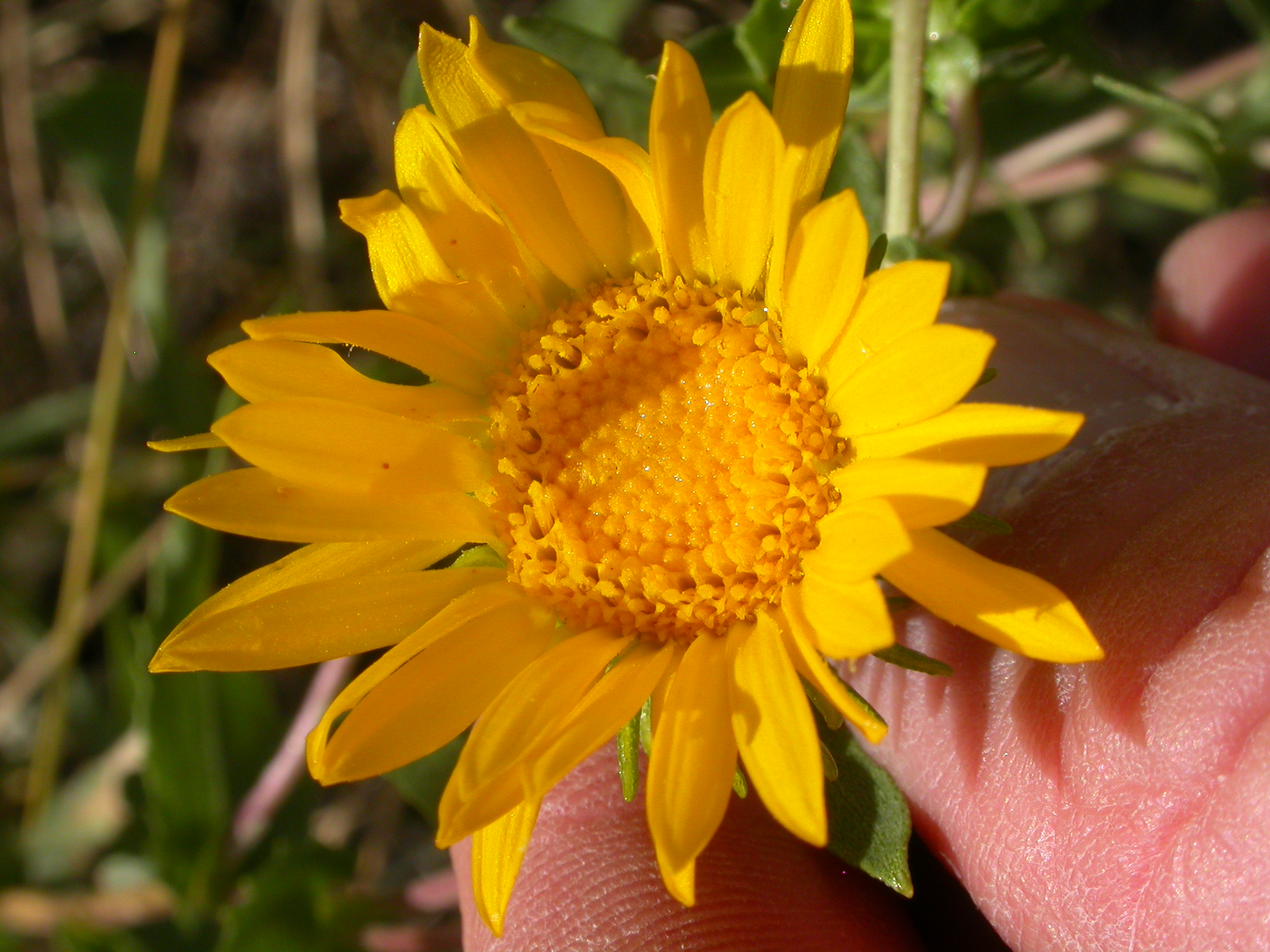

Scientific classification
- Kingdom: Plantae
- Clade: Tracheophytes
- Clade: Angiosperms
- Clade: Eudicots
- Clade: Asterids
- Order: Asterales
- Family: Asteraceae
- Genus: Grindelia
- Species: G. nana

Binomial name
- Grindelia nana Nutt.

= Grindelia nana =

Species of flowering plant

Grindelia nana is a species of flowering plant in the daisy family known by the common names Idaho gumplant and Idaho gumweed. It is native to western North America, especially the western United States, where it can be found in a number of dry habitats. This is a weedlike perennial herb growing mainly erect to heights between 20 centimeters and one meter. Its stems and foliage are mostly green with some reddish coloration. Leaves are up to 9 centimeters long. The tops of the stem branches bear flower heads one or two centimeters wide, which are bell-shaped with rounded bases. The head is a cup of green clawlike, curling or erect phyllaries.

The overall flower is a bright golden yellow. The center of the head is filled with many disc florets and the circumference is lined with yellow ray florets.
