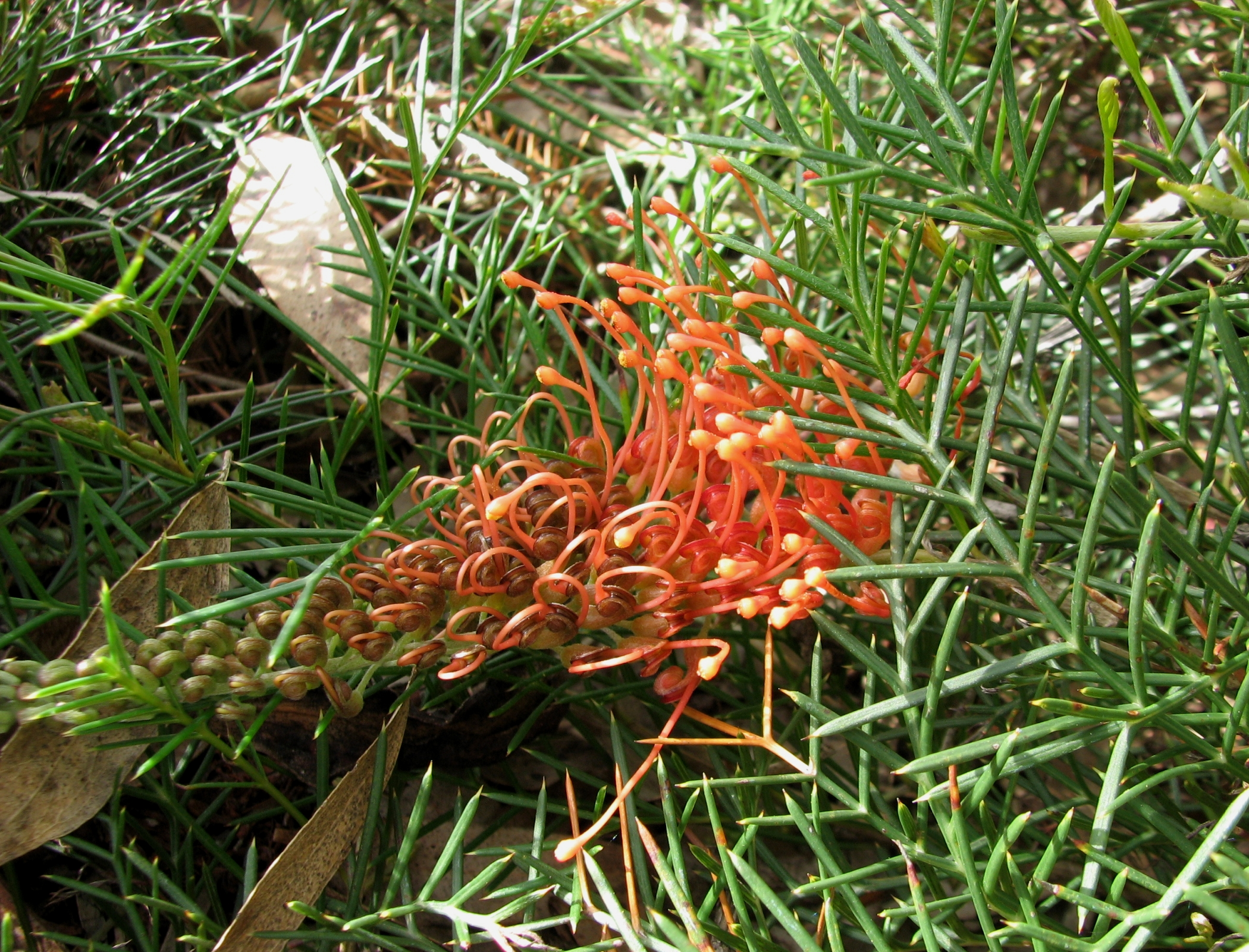
- In the Royal Botanic Gardens, Cranbourne

Conservation status
- Least Concern (IUCN 3.1)

Scientific classification
- Kingdom: Plantae
- Clade: Tracheophytes
- Clade: Angiosperms
- Clade: Eudicots
- Order: Proteales
- Family: Proteaceae
- Genus: Grevillea
- Species: G. nana

Binomial name
- Grevillea nana C.A.Gardner

= Grevillea nana =

Species of shrub endemic to Western Australia

Grevillea nana, commonly known as dwarf grevillea, is a species of flowering plant in the family Proteaceae and is endemic to the south-west of Western Australia. It is a prostrate to low, mounded, dense shrub with divided leaves with sharply-pointed, linear lobes, and clusters of pink, orange, yellow or red flowers.

== Description ==
Grevillea nana is a prostrate to dense, mounded shrub that typically grows to 15–50 cm (5.9–19.7 in) high and 1–2 m (3 ft 3 in – 6 ft 7 in) wide. Its leaves are 100–300 mm (3.9–11.8 in) long and divided with 5 to 19 lobes, their size varying with subspecies. The flowers are arranged near the ground and at the base of the foliage on a rachis 60–170 mm (2.4–6.7 in) long, and are silky- to woolly-hairy on the outside, the colour varying with subspecies, the pistil 24–28 mm (0.94–1.10 in) long. Flowering time also varies with subspecies, and the fruit is a hairy follicle 15–19 mm (0.59–0.75 in) long.

== Taxonomy ==
Grevillea nana was first formally described in 1943 by Charles Gardner in the Journal of the Royal Society of Western Australia from specimens collected by William Blackall between Koorda and Bencubbin. The specific epithet (nana) means "dwarf".

In 1986, Donald McGillivray described two subspecies of G. nana in his book, New Names in Grevillea (Proteaceae), and the names are accepted by the Australian Plant Census:

- Grevillea nana subsp. abbreviata McGill. has leaves with 7 to 19 lobes that are usually 3–20 mm (0.12–0.79 in) long and 0.7–0.9 mm (0.028–0.035 in) wide, and green or greenish-fawn flowers with a pink to purplish style from August to October.
- Grevillea nana C.A.Gardner subsp. nana has leaves with 5 to 13 lobes that are 20–130 mm (0.79–5.12 in) long and 1.1–1.4 mm (0.043–0.055 in) wide, and creamy-green or greenish-pink to scarlet flowers with a purplish, red or pale orange style from June to October.

== Distribution and habitat ==
Subspecies abbreviata grows on shallow soil around granite outcrops in shrubland in the area around Wubin and about 30 km (19 mi) to the east, in the Avon Wheatbelt bioregion. Subspecies nana grows in open heath and shrubland from near Bullfinch to Mount Gibson and Manmanning in the Avon Wheatbelt, Coolgardie, Murchison and Yalgoo bioregions of south-western Western Australia..

== Conservation status ==
Subspecies nana is listed as not threatened but subspecies abbreviata is listed as priority two by the Western Australian Government Department of Biodiversity, Conservation and Attractions, meaning that it is poorly known and from only one or a few locations.
