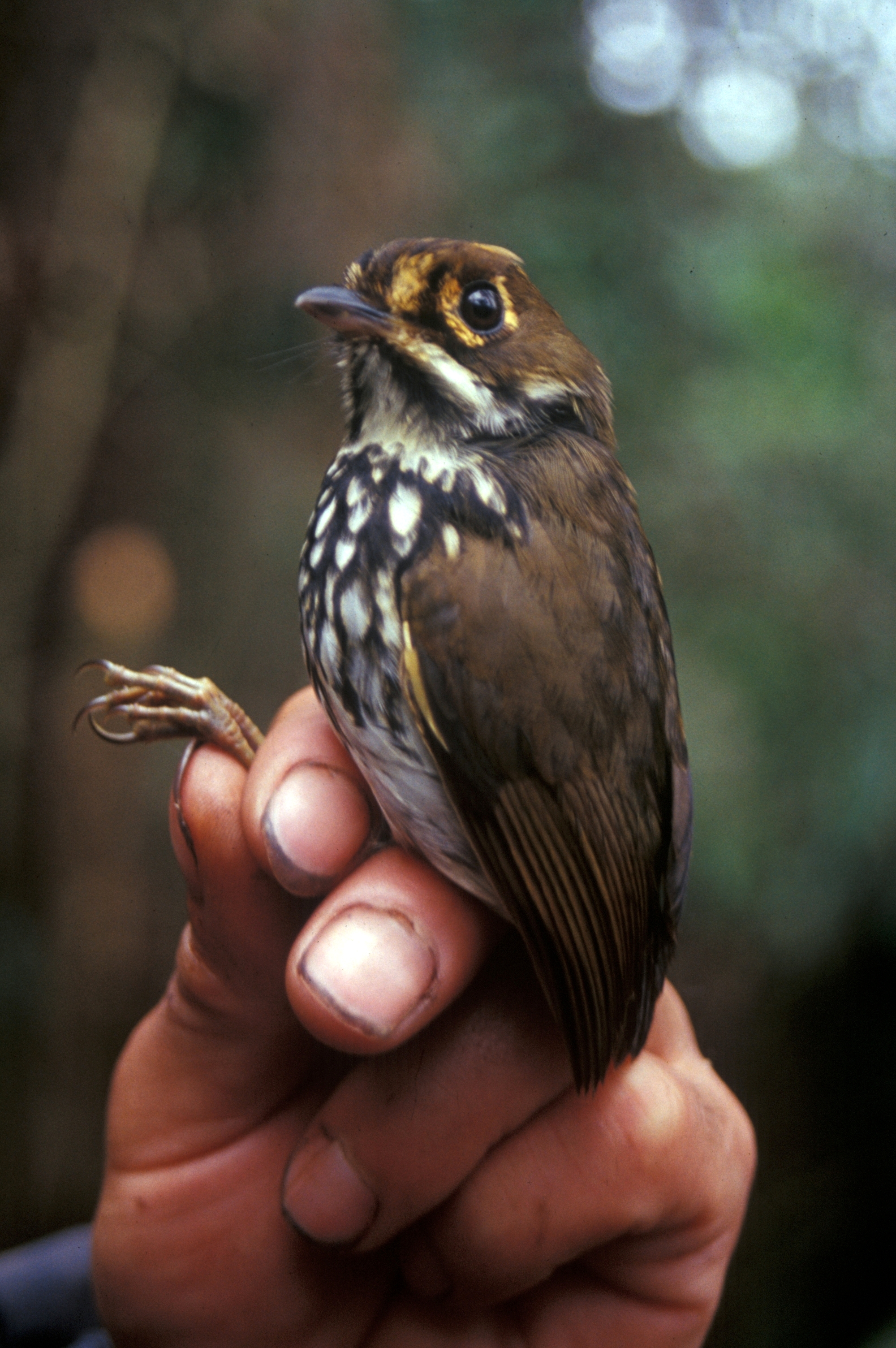

Conservation status
- Near Threatened (IUCN 3.1)

Scientific classification
- Kingdom: Animalia
- Phylum: Chordata
- Class: Aves
- Order: Passeriformes
- Family: Grallariidae
- Genus: Grallaricula
- Species: G. peruviana

Binomial name
- Grallaricula peruviana Chapman, 1923

= Peruvian antpitta =

Species of bird

The Peruvian antpitta (Grallaricula peruviana) is a Near Threatened species of bird in the family Grallariidae. It is found in Ecuador and Peru.

== Taxonomy and systematics ==
The Peruvian antpitta is monotypic. It and the ochre-fronted antpitta (G. ochraceifrons) form a superspecies.

== Description ==
"Grallaricula are very small Andean antpittas, found mostly in low dense vegetation (such as treefall gaps, stream edges, and bamboo thickets)." The Peruvian antpitta is about 10 cm (3.9 in) long; five individuals weighed 17 to 21 g (0.60 to 0.74 oz). Adult males have a rufous-cream loral patch, a whitish partial eyering, and a white "moustache" with a black line below it on an otherwise brown face. Their crown and upper nape are rich orange-rufous. Their upperparts, wings, and tail are brown. Their throat is white. Their breast and belly are white and heavily covered with concave black crescents (scallops) except for the breast's center where the scallops are much lighter. The scallops end at the lower belly. Adult females have a rufous brown crown and nape, a buffy loral patch, and a buffy eyering. Their white "moustache" becomes a crescent across their upper chest. The black scallops on their underparts extend only to their belly and not onto it. Their upperparts, wings, and tail are like the male's. Both sexes have a dark chestnut iris, a blackish or grayish bill with a dull yellowish green tip, and pale pinkish gray legs and feet.

== Distribution and habitat ==
The Peruvian antpitta is found on the eastern slope of the Andes. Its core range extends from central Morona-Santiago Province in Ecuador south into Peru as far as the Maranon River in the Department of Cajamarca. There are also scattered records in Peru as far north as Napo Province. The species' habitat requirements are not known, but it appears to favor riparian areas and intact humid forest in the subtropical zone, shunning disturbed areas.

== Behavior ==
=== Movement ===
The Peruvian antpitta is resident throughout its range.

=== Feeding ===
The Peruvian antpitta's diet is not known in detail but includes insects, other invertebrates, and small frogs. It apparently forages by gleaning in low vegetation but rarely feeds on the ground.

=== Breeding ===
Two Peruvian antpitta nests are known. They were active in May and September, which suggests that the species has a long breeding period that may extend year-round. The nests were shallow cups of moss placed on a platform of sticks and lined with dark rootlets. They were 0.8 and 2.4 m (3 and 8 ft) above the ground in small saplings, supported by ferns, thin branches, and epiphytes. Both members of the pairs built them. One nest had a single pale brown egg with heavy darker and lighter markings. It was incubated by both parents for 20 days. Both parents brooded and provisioned the nestling. The time to fledging was not known.

=== Vocalization ===
The vocalizations of the Peruvian antpitta are imperfectly known. One, which might be a song, is "a single whistled note, given every 4-15 seconds: a rising-falling wheeu?". Another, which is interpreted as an alarm call, is "a repeated, piercing eeeup!".

== Status ==
The IUCN has assessed the Peruvian antpitta as Near Threatened. It has a limited range and its estimated population of between 2500 and 10,000 mature individuals is believed to be decreasing. "The only threat known to this species is the loss and degradation of its forested habitat for conversion to agriculture and cattle pasture, mining operations and logging." It is considered "rare and local" in Ecuador and "presumably secretive and rare" in Peru. "[I]t appears that this species is confined to mature forest, often close to riparian areas, and any activities which threaten such habitat within their range are likely threats."
