= List of cotingas =

The cotingas (Cotingidae) are a clade of suboscines bird species of neotropical distribution in South America and Central America. The group contains more than 60 living species and is in the clade Tyrannides (along with Pipridae, Oxyruncidae, Onychorhynchidae, Tityridae, Pipritidae, Platyrinchidae, Tachurididae, Rhynchocyclidae, Tyrannidae, Melanopareiidae, Conopophagidae, Thamnophilidae, Grallariidae, Rhinocryptidae, Formicariidae, and Furnariidae). The International Ornithological Committee (IOC) recognizes these 66 species of cotingas distributed among 24 genera, nine of which have only one species.

This list is presented according to the IOC taxonomic sequence and can also be sorted alphabetically by common name and binomial.

Common name	Binomial name	IOC sequence
Scaled fruiteater	Ampelioides tschudii	1
Fiery-throated fruiteater	Pipreola chlorolepidota	2
Scarlet-breasted fruiteater	Pipreola frontalis	3
Handsome fruiteater	Pipreola formosa	4
Red-banded fruiteater	Pipreola whitelyi	5
Black-chested fruiteater	Pipreola lubomirskii	6
Orange-breasted fruiteater	Pipreola jucunda	7
Masked fruiteater	Pipreola pulchra	8
Golden-breasted fruiteater	Pipreola aureopectus	9
Barred fruiteater	Pipreola arcuata	10
Band-tailed fruiteater	Pipreola intermedia	11
Green-and-black fruiteater	Pipreola riefferii	12
Grey-tailed piha	Snowornis subalaris	13
Olivaceous piha	Snowornis cryptolophus	14
Hooded berryeater	Carpornis cucullata	15
Black-headed berryeater	Carpornis melanocephala	16
Andean cock-of-the-rock	Rupicola peruvianus	17
Guianan cock-of-the-rock	Rupicola rupicola	18
Guianan red cotinga	Phoenicircus carnifex	19
Black-necked red cotinga	Phoenicircus nigricollis	20
White-cheeked cotinga	Zaratornis stresemanni	21
Rufous-tailed plantcutter	Phytotoma rara	22
Peruvian plantcutter	Phytotoma raimondii	23
White-tipped plantcutter	Phytotoma rutila	24
Swallow-tailed cotinga	Phibalura flavirostris	25
Palkachupa cotinga	Phibalura boliviana	26
Bay-vented cotinga	Doliornis sclateri	27
Chestnut-bellied cotinga	Doliornis remseni	28
Red-crested cotinga	Ampelion rubrocristatus	29
Chestnut-crested cotinga	Ampelion rufaxilla	30
Crimson fruitcrow	Haematoderus militaris	31
Purple-throated fruitcrow	Querula purpurata	32
Red-ruffed fruitcrow	Pyroderus scutatus	33
Bare-necked umbrellabird	Cephalopterus glabricollis	34
Long-wattled umbrellabird	Cephalopterus penduliger	35
Amazonian umbrellabird	Cephalopterus ornatus	36
Capuchinbird	Perissocephalus tricolor	37
Rufous piha	Lipaugus unirufus	38
Rose-collared piha	Lipaugus streptophorus	39
Screaming piha	Lipaugus vociferans	40
Cinnamon-vented piha	Lipaugus lanioides	41
Black-and-gold cotinga	Lipaugus ater	42
Grey-winged cotinga	Lipaugus conditus	43
Chestnut-capped piha	Lipaugus weberi	44
Dusky piha	Lipaugus fuscocinereus	45
Scimitar-winged piha	Lipaugus uropygialis	46
White bellbird	Procnias albus	47
Three-wattled bellbird	Procnias tricarunculatus	48
Bare-throated bellbird	Procnias nudicollis	49
Bearded bellbird	Procnias averano	50
Plum-throated cotinga	Cotinga maynana	51
Spangled cotinga	Cotinga cayana	52
Lovely cotinga	Cotinga amabilis	53
Blue cotinga	Cotinga nattererii	54
Turquoise cotinga	Cotinga ridgwayi	55
Banded cotinga	Cotinga maculata	56
Purple-breasted cotinga	Cotinga cotinga	57
Purple-throated cotinga	Porphyrolaema porphyrolaema	58
Black-faced cotinga	Conioptilon mcilhennyi	59
Bare-necked fruitcrow	Gymnoderus foetidus	60
Pompadour cotinga	Xipholena punicea	61
White-tailed cotinga	Xipholena lamellipennis	62
White-winged cotinga	Xipholena atropurpurea	63
Black-tipped cotinga	Carpodectes hopkei	64
Yellow-billed cotinga	Carpodectes antoniae	65
Snowy cotinga	Carpodectes nitidus	66
