= Fruitcrow =

The fruitcrows are several species of birds in the Cotinga family:

- Genus Gymnoderus.
  - Bare-necked fruitcrow (Gymnoderus foetidus).
- Genus Haematoderus.
  - Crimson fruitcrow (Haematoderus militaris).
- Genus Querula.
  - Purple-throated fruitcrow (Querula purpurata).
- Genus Pyroderus.
  - Red-ruffed fruitcrow (Pyroderus scutatus).
