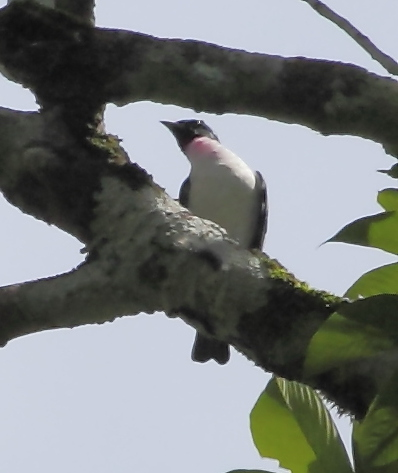
- Male at Apiacás, State of Mato Grosso, Brazil
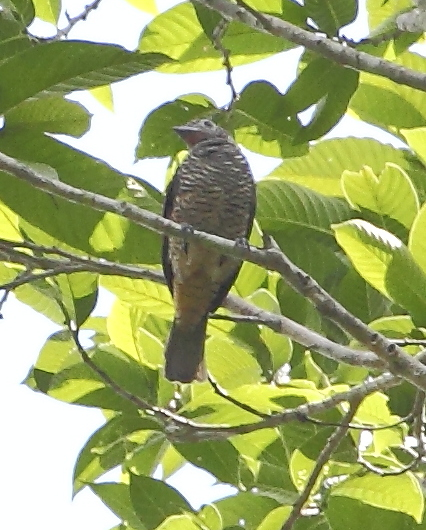
- Female at the same locality

Conservation status
- Least Concern (IUCN 3.1)

Scientific classification
- Kingdom: Animalia
- Phylum: Chordata
- Class: Aves
- Order: Passeriformes
- Family: Cotingidae
- Genus: Porphyrolaema; Bonaparte, 1854
- Species: P. porphyrolaema

Binomial name
- Porphyrolaema porphyrolaema (Deville & Sclater, PL, 1852)
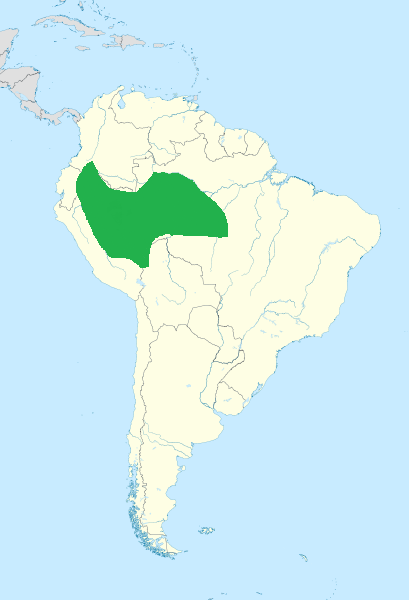
- Green marking the range of the purple-throated cotinga

Synonyms
- Cotinga porphyrolaema Deville & Sclater, 1852

= Purple-throated cotinga =

Species of bird

The purple-throated cotinga (Porphyrolaema porphyrolaema) is a species of bird in the cotinga family, Cotingidae. It is found in the western Amazon rainforest of South America; its range extends from southern Colombia south through eastern Ecuador and Peru and east through extreme northwestern Bolivia and into western Amazonian Brazil. It lives in the canopy or along the borders of humid forest throughout its range. The purple-throated cotinga is monotypic within the genus Porphyrolaema and has no known subspecies. It is one of the smaller cotinga species and expresses strong sexual dimorphism. Males have black upperparts with a bold white wingstripe and white edges to the tertial feathers and a white belly with some black barring on the rear flanks. The throat is a deep purple, giving the bird both its common and scientific names. Females are dark brown with pale buffy margins on the upperparts, buffy cinnamon with black barring on the underparts, and rufous on the throat. The male has a powerful voice.

Little research has been done on this species, and not much is known about its ecology. The purple-throated cotinga is primarily frugivorous, although it does occasionally eat small insects. A solitary male attracts a female by perching in the canopy and letting the sunlight reflect off its iridescent feathers. It is suspected to breed year-round and is non-migratory. Despite being considered naturally uncommon or rare across its vast range, the purple-throated cotinga is listed as a species of Least Concern.

== Taxonomy ==
The purple-throated cotinga was originally described in 1852 as Cotinga porphyrolaema by Emile Deville and Philip Sclater from a male specimen collected near the Ucayali River in Peru's Sarayacu District. The holotype is kept at the Jardin des Plantes in Paris. However, just two years later the species was split from the genus Cotinga into the monotypic genus Porphyrolaema by Charles Lucien Bonaparte. The generic and specific name of porphyrolaema comes from the Ancient Greek words porphyros "dark purple," and laimos, "throat."

While it is structurally similar to the Cotinga species, the purple-throated cotinga differs from them in that it has a heavier, stubbier bill, distinctive pale fringing on the back feathers, a square-ended tail, and barred underparts in the female. While it is still generally considered to be closely related to the Cotinga species, recent molecular analysis has suggested that the species may in fact form a separate clade with other canopy-dwelling cotingas, specifically the neotropical bellbirds of the genus Procnias, the cotingas of the genus Carpodectes, the black-faced cotinga of the monotypic genus Conioptilon, and the bare-necked fruitcrow of the monotypic genus Gymnoderus. Of these genera, the molecular analysis suggested that the purple-throated cotinga was most closely related to the neotropical bellbirds. This cotinga does not have a recognized subspecies.

== Description ==
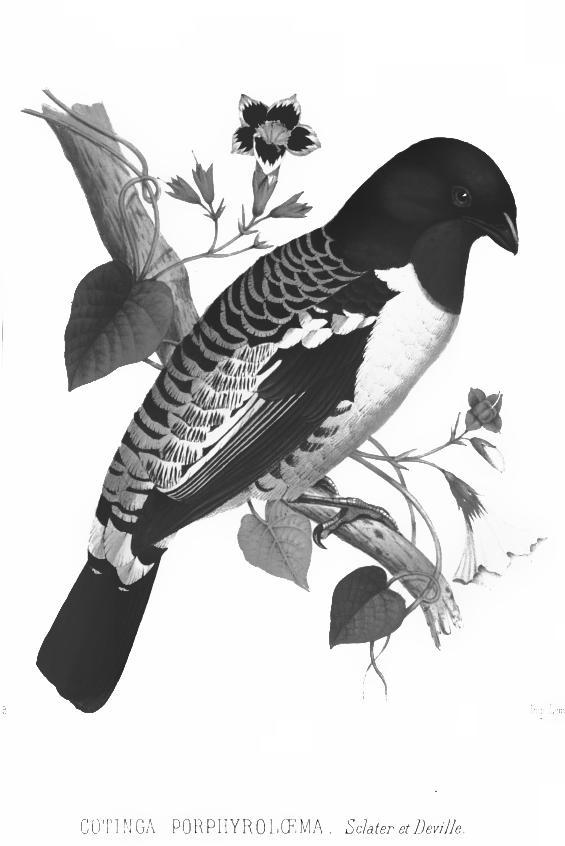
Male from Contributions to Ornithology 1848 - 1852, Volume 2, 1852

The purple-throated cotinga is strongly sexually dimorphic as male and female purple-throated cotingas have few similarities in their plumage. The male has black upperparts, including the head, wings, and tail. The feathers on the bird's back to its uppertail coverts, as well as its upperwing coverts, have white fringes, giving it a scaled appearance. There is also a conspicuous white wingstripe and white edges to the tertial feathers. Additionally, the male has a deeply purple throat and a white belly, with some black barring on its rear flanks.

In contrast, the female purple-throated cotinga is a dark brown with pale buffy margins on the upperparts. The underparts are a buffy cinnamon with black barring. The throat is a deeper, unbarred rufous in coloration. The female's tail feathers are longer and more pointed at the tip than those of the male. The juvenile purple-throated cotinga resembles a paler, buffier female; the plumage of the immature is undescribed.

The adult purple-throated cotinga is about 16.5 to 18.5 cm (6.5 to 7.3 in) in length and weighs an average of 49 to 60 g (1.7 to 2.1 oz), with males being very slightly smaller than females. The cotinga has a very wide bill with a strongly arched culmen and weakly developed rictal bristles. The bird's iris is dark brown, while the bill and legs are black. The tail is square-ended.

This species has a powerful if infrequently-used voice, unlike the structurally-similar Cotinga species, which are mostly silent. The male's call is a high, plaintive "preeeeeer" that lasts for one or two seconds while dropping in pitch and is regularly repeated from a treetop perch. It is also known to produce a tremulous "werleeyooo" that can be interspersed with the "preeeeeer" call.

== Distribution and habitat ==
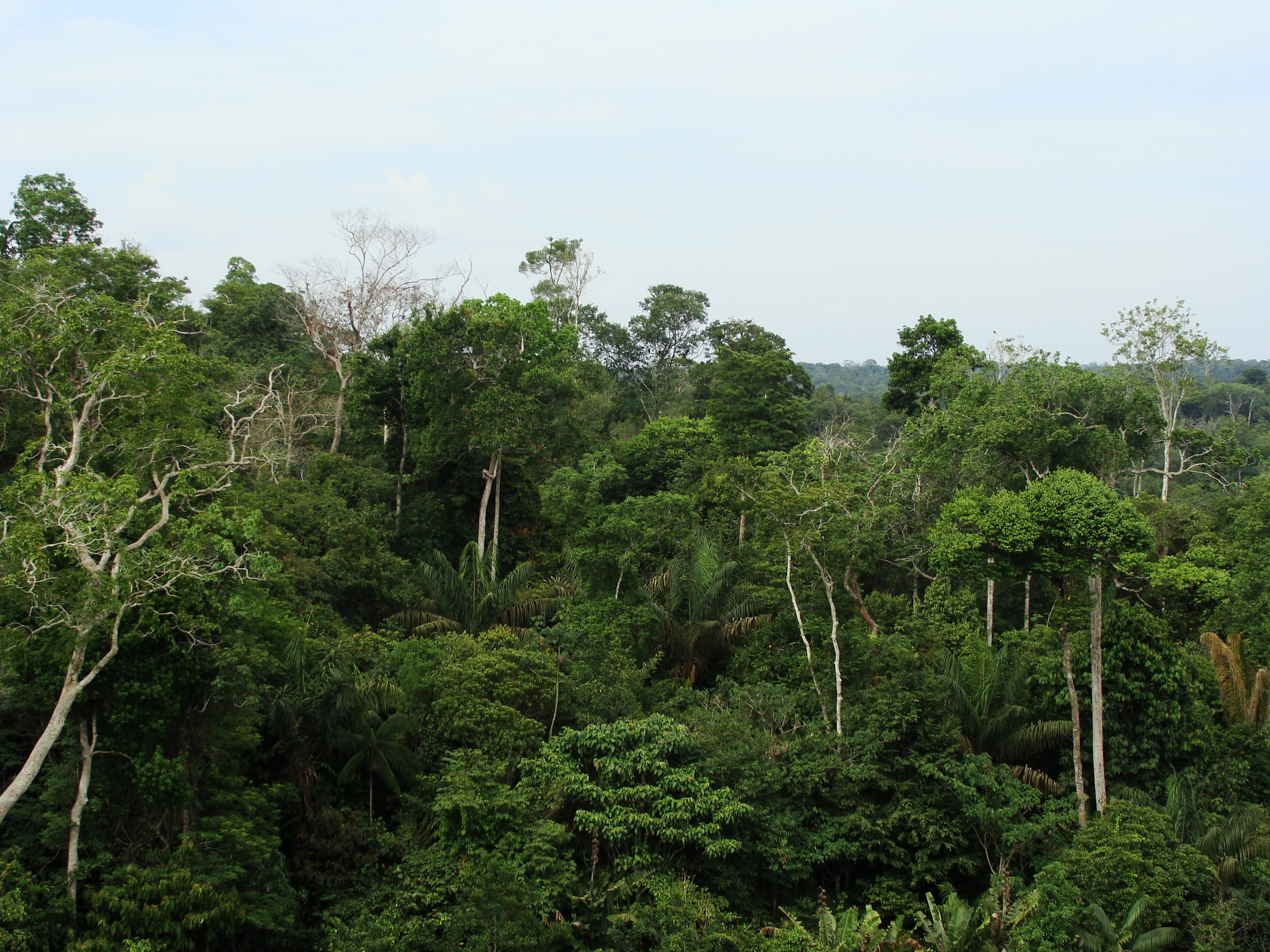
Rainforest canopy in Brazil

The purple-throated cotinga is found throughout western Amazonia from southern Colombia south through eastern Ecuador and Peru to the Madre de Dios region and east through extreme northwestern Bolivia and into western Amazonian Brazil. The eastern boundary of the species appears to be the lower Rio Negro and northern Mato Grosso in Brazil. The purple-throated cotinga's total range covers approximately 2,190,000 km^{2} (850,000 sq mi), throughout which it occurs in patches at low population densities. In southeastern Peru only two birds were found per 100 ha (250 acres), a ratio which likely is true across its range.

The cotinga can be found in the canopy or borders of humid forest up to 900 m (3,000 ft) in elevation, but mostly is restricted to humid forests below 400 m (1,300 ft). It can be found in either unflooded humid forests or in várzea forests, which are seasonally flooded. It is non-migratory.

== Ecology and behavior ==
The purple-throated cotinga feeds primarily on the fruits of forest trees, most notably those belonging to the genus Cecropia. It also occasionally consumes small invertebrates, such as insects. In portions of its range it is suspected that the cotinga has localized movements as it follows various fruiting events. The cotinga also is known to join mixed-species foraging flocks with other frugivores, including other species of cotinga and toucans. All reported observations of the species feeding involve the cotinga leaning down from its perch to pluck fruit off a tree in the forest canopy. These birds are distinct from similar species in that they are often seen in pairs. This species perches in the canopy to take in the morning sun.

A solitary male purple-throated cotinga attracts a female by perching above the canopy and letting the sun highlight its iridescent plumage. The breeding behavior of this species is largely unknown, but the range in molting times implies that this species may breed year-round. The only observed nest was found in a subcanopy tree about 20 m (66 ft) above the ground in December 1997. This nest was placed in the shade to protect it from sunlight at the meeting point of two horizontal branches. Only the female was observed incubating the nest, although the male was frequently seen nearby, possibly watching for predators.

== Status ==
The purple-throated cotinga is not well known and appears to be naturally uncommon or rare across a widespread area; however, it is almost certainly under-reported due to its canopy lifestyle. The IUCN considers this species to be a species of Least Concern due in part to its large range. While the IUCN has not estimated the population size, it believes it is declining due to habitat loss.
