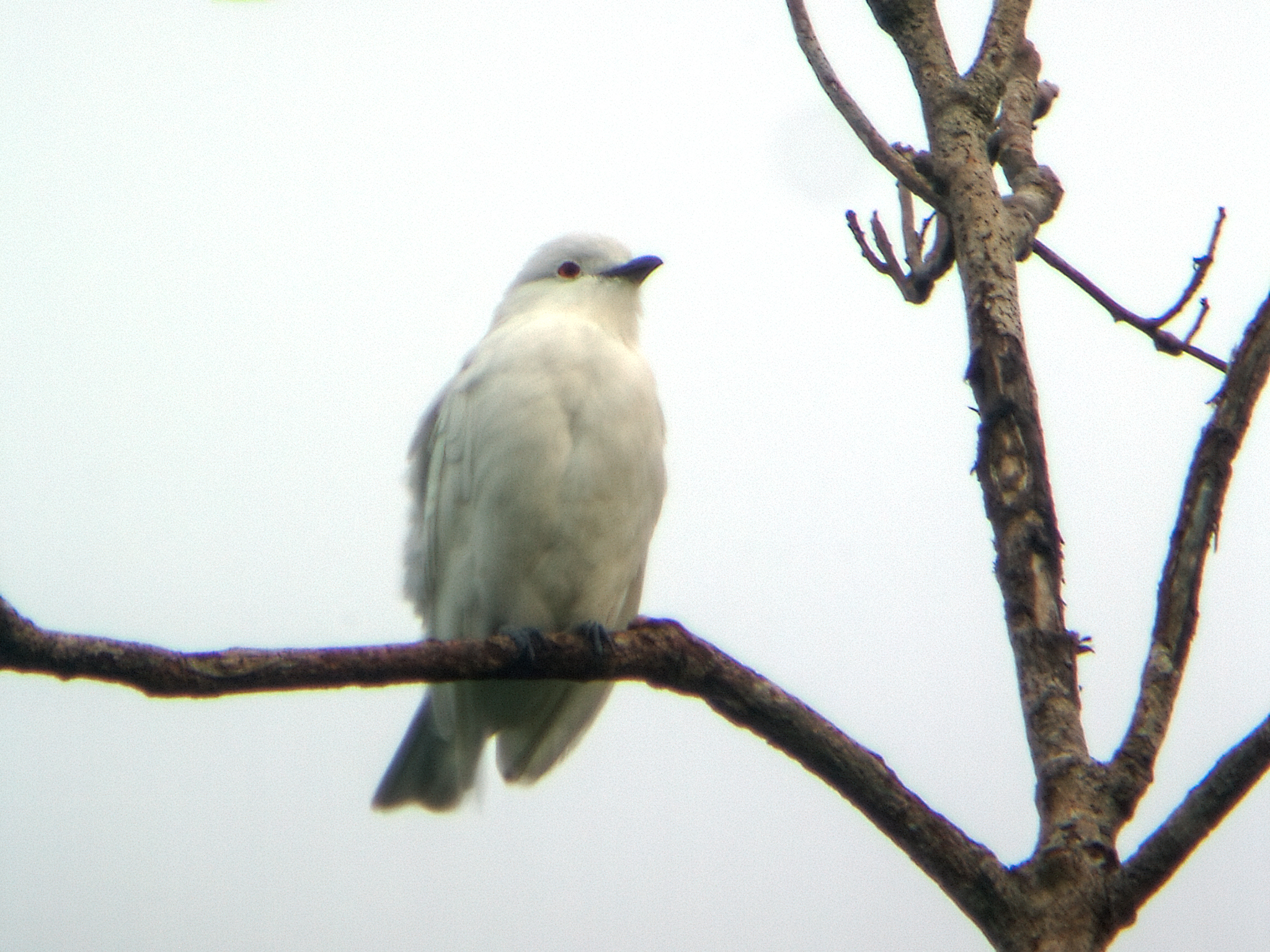

Conservation status
- Least Concern (IUCN 3.1)

Scientific classification
- Kingdom: Animalia
- Phylum: Chordata
- Class: Aves
- Order: Passeriformes
- Family: Cotingidae
- Genus: Carpodectes
- Species: C. hopkei

Binomial name
- Carpodectes hopkei Berlepsch, 1897

= Black-tipped cotinga =

Species of bird

The black-tipped cotinga (Carpodectes hopkei) is a species of bird in the family Cotingidae. It is found in Colombia, Ecuador, and Panama.

== Taxonomy and systematics ==
The black-tipped cotinga shares genus Carpodectes with the yellow-billed cotinga (C. antoniae) and the snowy cotinga (C. nitidus). One early twentieth century author treated them as conspecific but they have been otherwise treated as separate species. The three form a superspecies. The black-tipped cotinga is monotypic.

At least one twentieth century author called Carpodectes hopkei the white cotinga.

== Description ==
The black-tipped cotinga is 22 to 25 cm (8.7 to 9.8 in) long. The species is sexually dimorphic. Adult males are almost entirely white. They have a very faint gray tinge on their crown, back, and tail and small blackish spots on the tips of the outer primaries and innermost pair of tail feathers. Their flight feathers are wide and have rounded tips. Adult females have a dark grayish head and upperparts and a blackish tail. Their wings are mostly blackish with white edges on the coverts and inner flight feathers. Their breast is pale gray that fades to white towards the vent. Their secondaries are much thinner than the male's. Both sexes have an orange to dark red iris and blackish legs and feet. Their black bill has a wide base, a ridged culmen, and a notch on the tip of the maxilla. Immature birds of both sexes resemble adult females. Subadult males have almost adult plumage but have more dark markings on the wing feathers and black tips on most tail feathers.

== Distribution and habitat ==
The black-tipped cotinga is found from Darién Province in southeastern Panama south in the lowlands through western Colombia into northwestern Ecuador as far as northern Pichincha Province. There are also scattered sightings further south in Ecuador. It primarily inhabits the canopy of humid forest in the tropical zone and occasionally is found in nearby secondary woodland. In elevation it ranges from sea level to 1,000 m (3,300 ft) in Panama and to 1,200 m (3,900 ft) in Colombia; it is found mostly below 500 m (1,600 ft) in Ecuador.

== Behavior ==
=== Movement ===
Though the black-tipped cotinga is believed to be a year-round resident, some seasonal movements are suspected.

=== Feeding ===
The black-tipped cotinga feeds mostly on fruits though details are lacking. It does seem to favor those of Cecropia trees. It sometimes forages in groups of up to about six individuals.

=== Breeding ===
Males make a display fight during which they flap their wings very slowly. Nothing else is known about the species' breeding biology.

=== Vocalization ===
As of October 2025 xeno-canto had only two recordings of black-tipped cotinga calls; the Cornell Lab's Macaulay Library had one of them but no others. No song is known for the species.

== Status ==
The IUCN originally in 1994 assessed the black-tipped cotinga as Near Threatened but since 2000 as being of Least Concern. Its estimated population of between 20,000 and 50,000 mature individuals is believed to be decreasing. No immediate threats have been identified. It is considered rare to locally fairly common and occurs in some protected areas. However, its population has been "undoubtedly reduced by recent destruction of lowland forest, especially in NW Ecuador".
