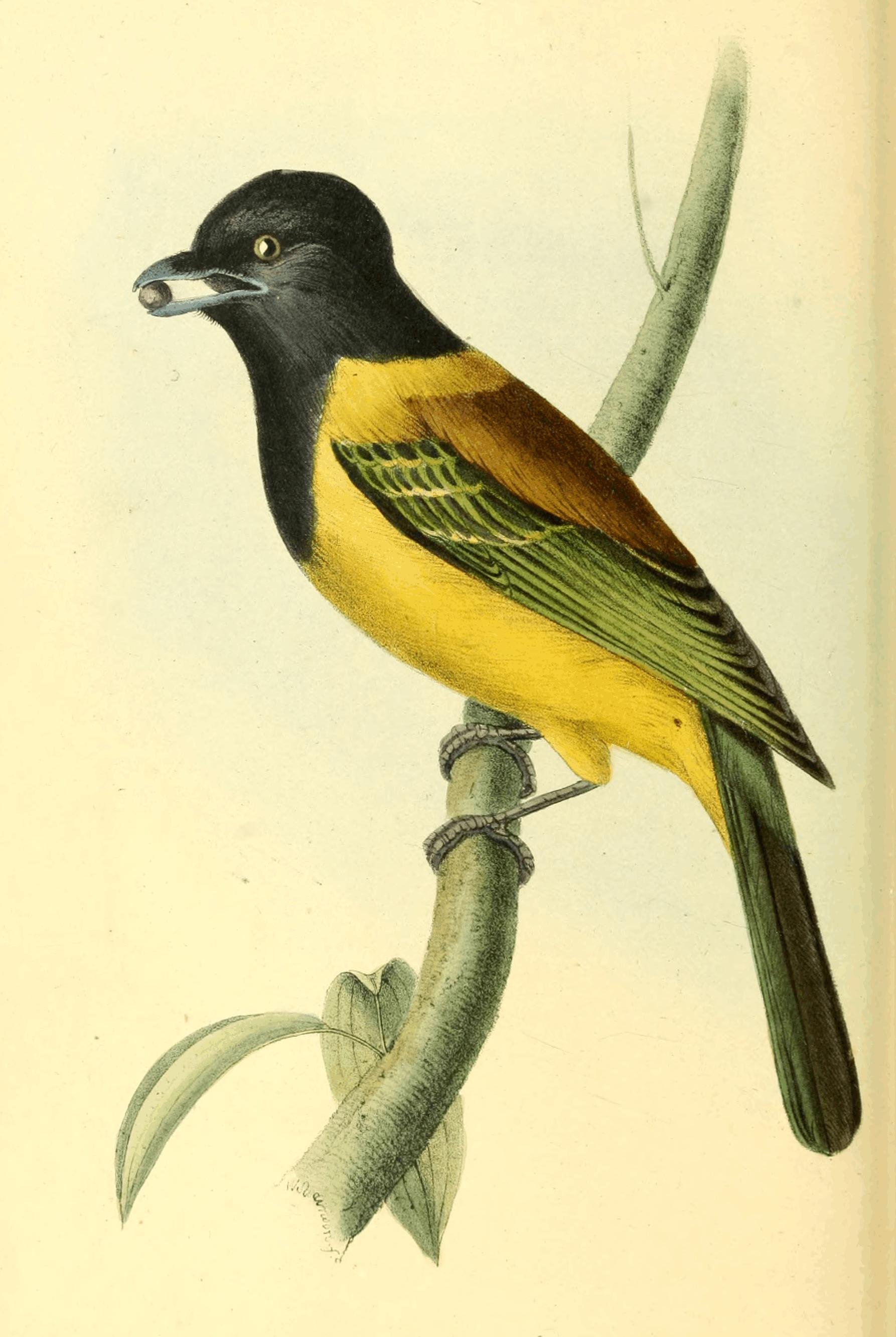

Scientific classification
- Domain: Eukaryota
- Kingdom: Animalia
- Phylum: Chordata
- Class: Aves
- Order: Passeriformes
- Family: Cotingidae
- Genus: Carpornis; G.R. Gray, 1846

= Berryeater =

Berryeaters

Genus of birds

Carpornis, the berryeaters, is a genus of birds in the family Cotingidae. These primarily frugivorous birds are endemic to the southern half of the Atlantic forest (eastern Brazil).

The genus contains two species. Both species are mainly greenish-yellow with a black hood. The genus is sister to the genus Snowornis that contains two pihas.

Genus Carpornis – G.R. Gray, 1846 – two species
Common name	Scientific name and subspecies	Range	Size and ecology	IUCN status and estimated population
Hooded berryeater	Carpornis cucullata (Swainson, 1821)	Brazil	Size: Habitat: Diet:	LC
Black-headed berryeater	Carpornis melanocephala (Wied, 1820)	Brazil	Size: Habitat: Diet:	NT
