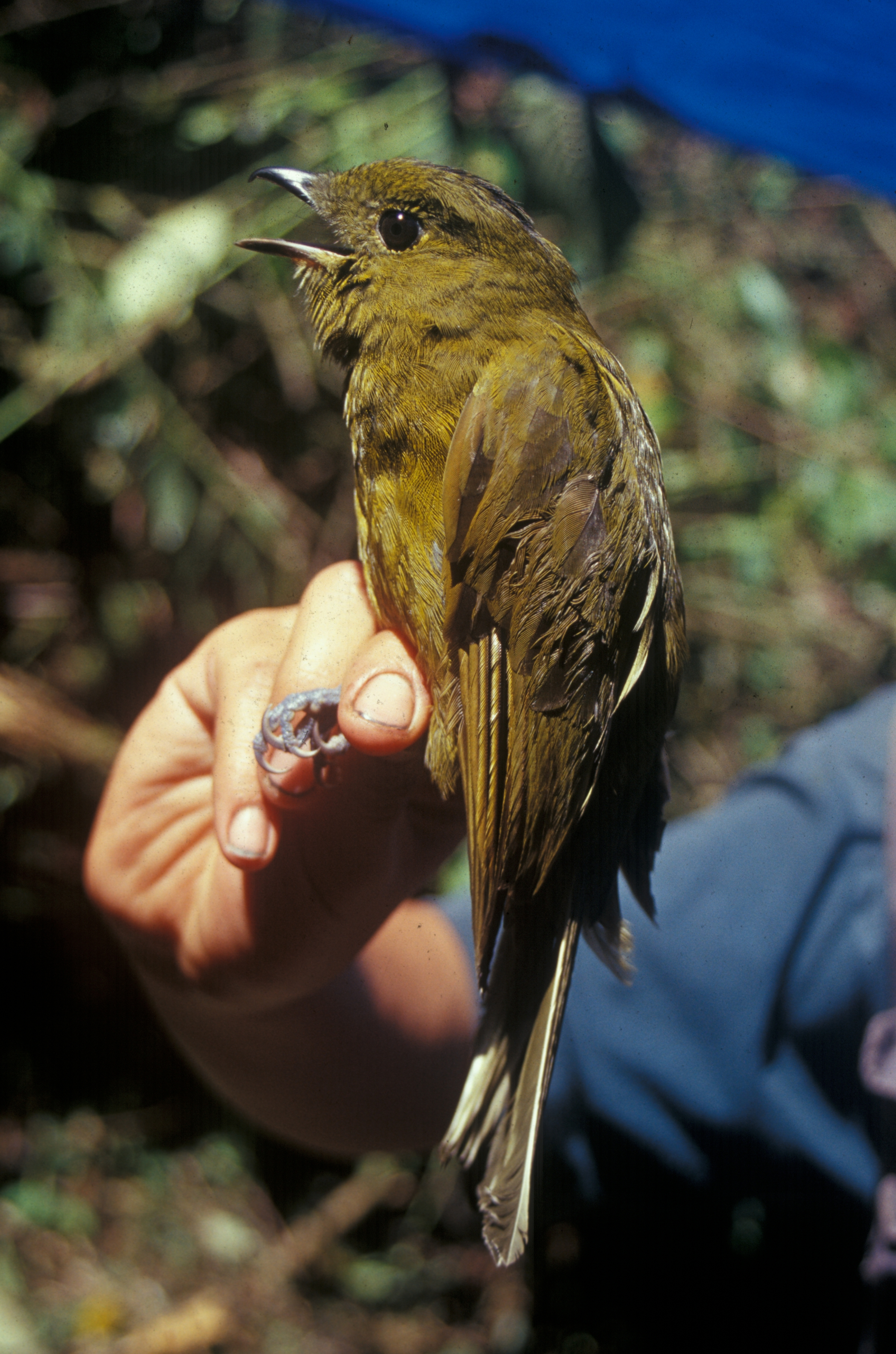
- Olivaceous piha (Snowornis cryptolophus)

Scientific classification
- Kingdom: Animalia
- Phylum: Chordata
- Class: Aves
- Order: Passeriformes
- Family: Cotingidae
- Genus: Snowornis; Prum, 2001

Type species
- Lipaugus subalaris (grey-tailed piha) Sclater 1861

= Snowornis =

Genus of birds

Snowornis is a genus of birds in the family Cotingidae. The species were formerly included in the genus Lipaugus,

The genus Snowornis was introduced in 2001 by Richard Prum with the grey-tailed piha as the type species. The name was chosen to honour the ornithologist David W. Snow. His name is combined with the Ancient Greek ornis meaning "bird". The genus is sister to the genus Carpornis which contains the two berryeaters.

The genus contains two species.

Image	Scientific name	Common name	Distribution
	Snowornis cryptolophus	Olivaceous piha	Colombia, Ecuador, and Peru.
	Snowornis subalaris	Grey-tailed piha	Colombia, Ecuador and Peru.
