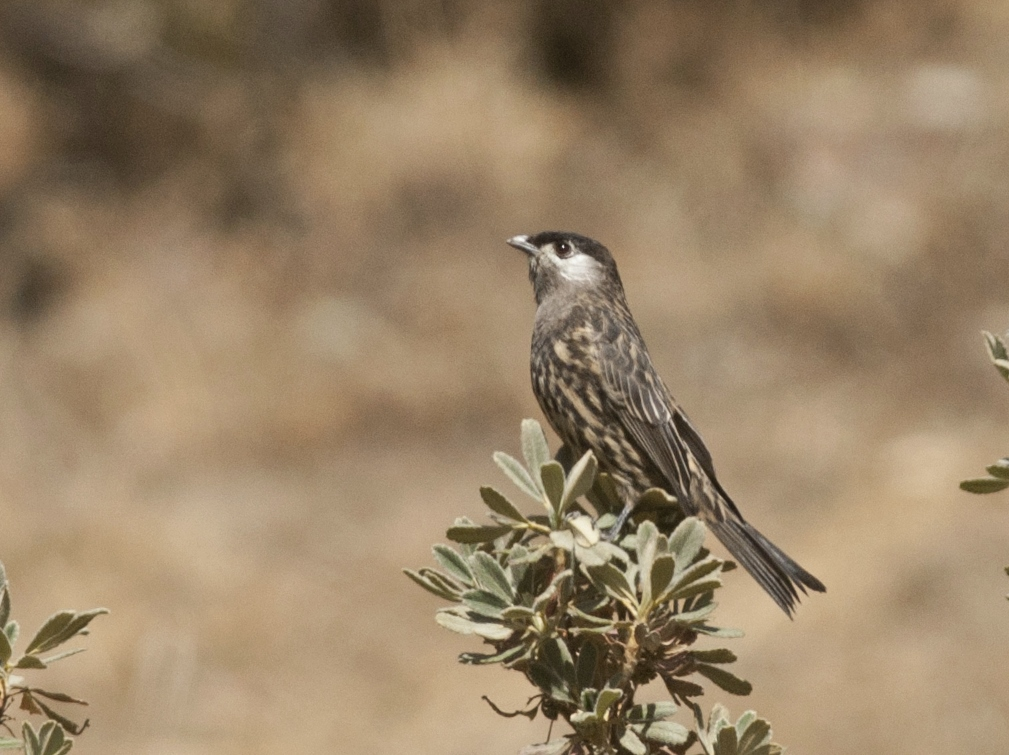

Conservation status
- Near Threatened (IUCN 3.1)

Scientific classification
- Kingdom: Animalia
- Phylum: Chordata
- Class: Aves
- Order: Passeriformes
- Family: Cotingidae
- Genus: Zaratornis; Koepcke, 1954
- Species: Z. stresemanni

Binomial name
- Zaratornis stresemanni Koepcke, 1954

= White-cheeked cotinga =

Species of bird

The white-cheeked cotinga (Zaratornis stresemanni) is a Near Threatened species of bird in the family Cotingidae, the cotingas. It is endemic to Peru.

== Taxonomy and systematics ==
The white-cheeked cotinga was formally described in 1954 and assigned to genus Zaratornis that was erected for it. Some late twentieth century authors merged Zaratornis into Ampelion but this treatment was not widely adopted.

The white-cheeked cotinga is the only species in its genus and has no subspecies.

== Description ==
The white-cheeked cotinga is about 21 cm (8.3 in) long and weighs 46 to 57 g (1.6 to 2.0 oz). The sexes have the same plumage. Adults have a dirty brown-black forehead, crown, and lores. Their ear coverts are white to silvery and the rest of their face dark ashy brown. Their nape is ochre with heavy black streaks. Their upperparts are blackish with ochre to buff streaks. Their throat is dark ashy brown. Their underparts are rich ochre with heavy blackish streaks on the upper breast and sides; the streaks are narrower on the lower breast and flanks and absent from the undertail coverts. They have a dark to bright red iris, a stout, decurved bill with a lead blue base and a yellowish green tip that sometimes extends to most of the maxilla, and brownish gray to black legs and feet.

== Distribution and habitat ==
The white-cheeked cotinga is primarily found along the western slope of the Andes of Peru from Ancash Department south to Arequipa Department, though it occurs only spottily in the far north and south of its range. There are also a few records on the eastern slope. It almost exclusively inhabits Polylepis forest, whose groves tend to be separated by shrubby grasslands. There are some records in mixed-species woodlands. In elevation it primarily ranges between 3,800 to 4,400 m (12,500 to 14,400 ft) and infrequently occurs as low as 2,700 m (8,900 ft).

== Behavior ==
=== Movement ===
The white-cheeked cotinga is essentially a year-round resident though some dispersal to elevations below its core range occurs.

=== Feeding ===
The white-cheeked cotinga feeds on fruit, primarily that of mistletoes. Its diet possibly includes insects though there are no observations of such feeding. It mostly forages singly or in pairs, and in the non-breeding season also in small groups. It plucks the fruits while perched, often consuming several in quick succession. It regurgitates the sticky seeds and wipes them from its bill on branches; this practice apparently makes the species the primary dispersal agent of the mistletoes.

=== Breeding ===
The white-cheeked cotinga breeds at least in April and May and may begin it season earlier. Two birds appeared to display to each other with bowing, head bobbing, and wing flicking. One well-described nest was a deep cup made from moss and lichens with a few twigs lined with coarse grasses. Most nests have been in large clumps of mistletoe in Polylepis trees between about 4 and 7 m (15 and 25 ft) above the ground.

=== Vocalization ===
As of August 2025 xeno-canto had four recordings of white-cheeked cotinga vocalizations; the Cornell Lab's Macaulay Library had 11 with much overlap.

The white-cheeked cotinga's song is "a series of deep, burry accelerating quacks into a rising-falling chatter, slowing at the very end" djee-djee-DJEE-DJEE-djee'dje'dje'djer'r'r'r'r'dje'dje". Its call is "a deep, burry series of emphatic quacks: djee-djee-DJEE-DJEE-DJEEP". The species sings mostly early in the morning and late in the afternoon, and usually from an exposed perch. Both members of a pair sing as do other members of the non-breeding season groups.

== Status ==
The IUCN originally in 1988 assessed the white-cheeked cotinga as Threatened, then in 1994 as vulnerable, and since March 2023 as Near Threatened. It is patchily distributed across its range; its estimated population of between 2500 and 10,000 mature individuals is believed to be decreasing. "The most severe threat to the species are uncontrolled cutting of Polylepis woodlands for timber, firewood and charcoal, and heavy grazing by livestock, which prevent forest regeneration". The species is considered rare and local. It occurs in several protected areas though some are only nominally maintained.
