= Scaled fruiteater =

Conservation status
- Least Concern (IUCN 3.1)

Scientific classification
- Kingdom: Animalia
- Phylum: Chordata
- Class: Aves
- Order: Passeriformes
- Family: Cotingidae
- Genus: Ampelioides; Verreaux, 1867
- Species: A. tschudii

Binomial name
- Ampelioides tschudii (Gray, 1846)

Species of bird

The scaled fruiteater (Ampelioides tschudii) is a species of bird in the family Cotingidae. It is the only member of the genus Ampelioides. This bird is found in Bolivia, Colombia, Ecuador, Peru, and Venezuela, where its natural habitat is the high elevation tropical forests of the Andes mountains. The scaled fruiteater is a chunky, short-tailed, flat-headed bird measuring 19–20 cm (7.5–7.9 in) in length. It uses its green scaled feather pattern to blend in with the dense vegetation of the South American rainforest.

== Physical characteristics ==
The scaled fruiteater is characterized by its olive-green plumage with fine scaling on the chest and belly. The Scaled Fruiteater has a short and sharp beak, specialized for eating fruits, seeds, and insects. Males have an all-black head, display a more vibrant green color on their bodies, and have longer tails than females.

== Distribution and habitat ==
The scaled fruiteater is found in the montane forests of the Andes mountains. They inhabit dense rainforests where they stay below the canopy, often near streams or other water sources. This species is found at high elevations, ranging from 1,000 to 3,500 meters (3,300 to 11,500 ft) above sea level.

== Behavior and ecology ==
Scaled fruiteaters feed on a variety of fruits and berries that are unique to the South American mountain ranges. They supplement their diet with insects during the breeding season when protein-rich food is essential for raising young. These birds are known for their camouflage ability, utilizing their green scales to remain hidden within the dense vegetation. The Scaled Fruiteater is non-migratory and will stay in the Andes region year-round.

== Reproduction ==
During the breeding season, males establish territories and attract female mates through vocalizations and aerial displays. The nest is a shallow cup constructed from plant fibers where Females will typically lay two eggs, which are incubated for about two weeks. Both parents participate in feeding and caring for the chicks until they develop wings large enough for flight.

== Conservation status ==
The scaled fruiteater is considered a species of least concern by the International Union for Conservation of Nature (IUCN). While the bird continues to thrive, populations may be declining due to habitat loss caused by deforestation and human development. Conservation efforts focus on preserving and restoring their forest habitats and raising awareness about the importance of protecting these unique birds and their ecosystems.

== Cultural Significance ==
Scaled fruiteaters have captured the interest of birdwatchers and ecotourists, attracting visitors to the Andean regions where they are found. Their unique appearance and elusive behavior make them a sought-after sighting for bird enthusiasts. Because of their elusiveness there is a lack of research and knowledge on these birds.
