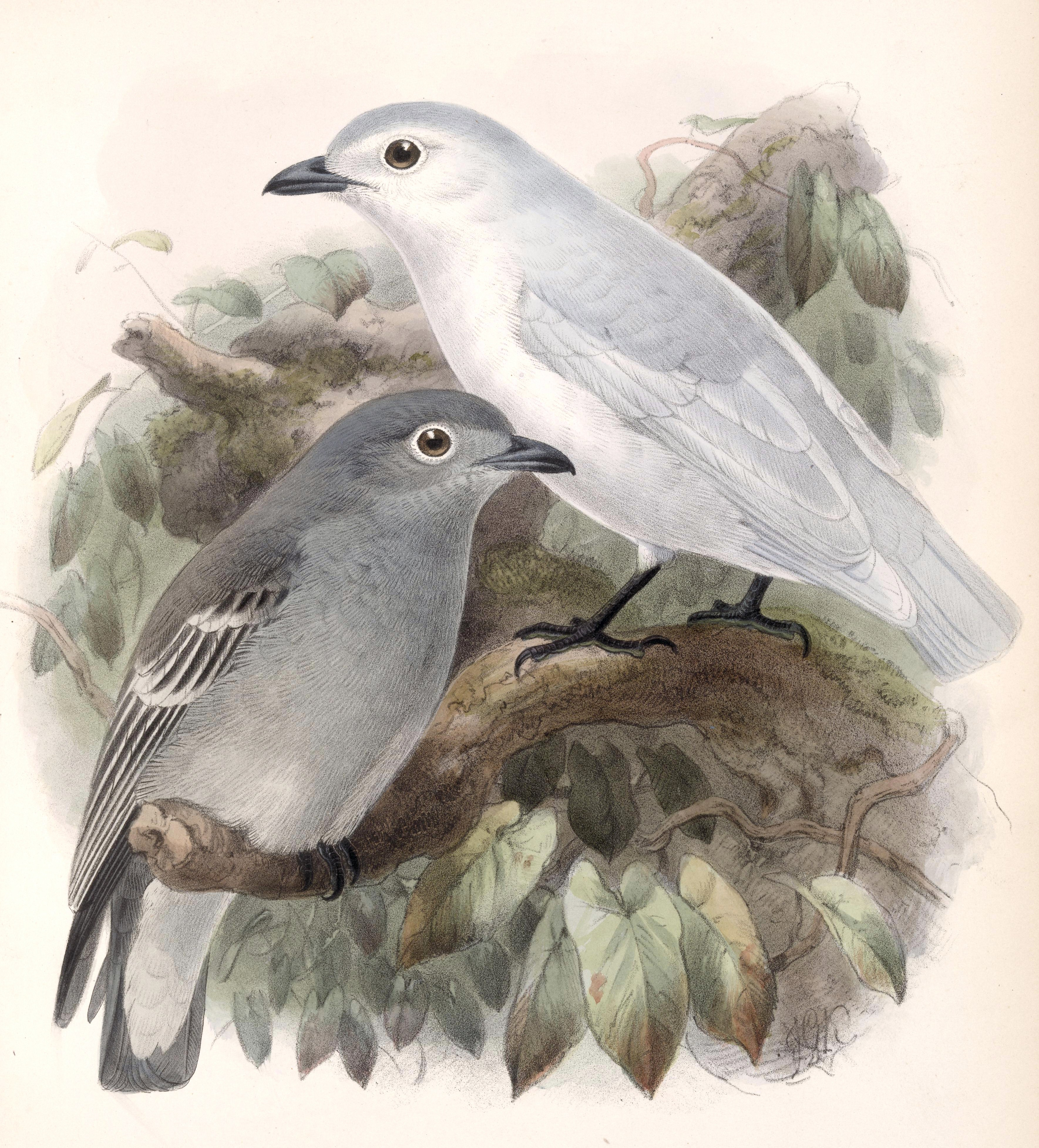
- Snowy cotinga (Carpodectes nitidus)

Scientific classification
- Kingdom: Animalia
- Phylum: Chordata
- Class: Aves
- Order: Passeriformes
- Family: Cotingidae
- Genus: Carpodectes; Salvin, 1865

Type species
- Carpodectes nitidus Salvin, 1865

= Carpodectes =

Genus of birds

Carpodectes is a genus of passerine birds in the family Cotingidae.

It contains the following species:

Image	Name	Common name	Distribution
	Carpodectes hopkei	Black-tipped cotinga	Chocó region, from southeastern Panama to northwestern Ecuador
	Carpodectes antoniae	Yellow-billed cotinga	Pacific slope of Costa Rica and Panama
	Carpodectes nitidus	Snowy cotinga	Honduras, Nicaragua, Costa Rica and extreme northwestern Panama
