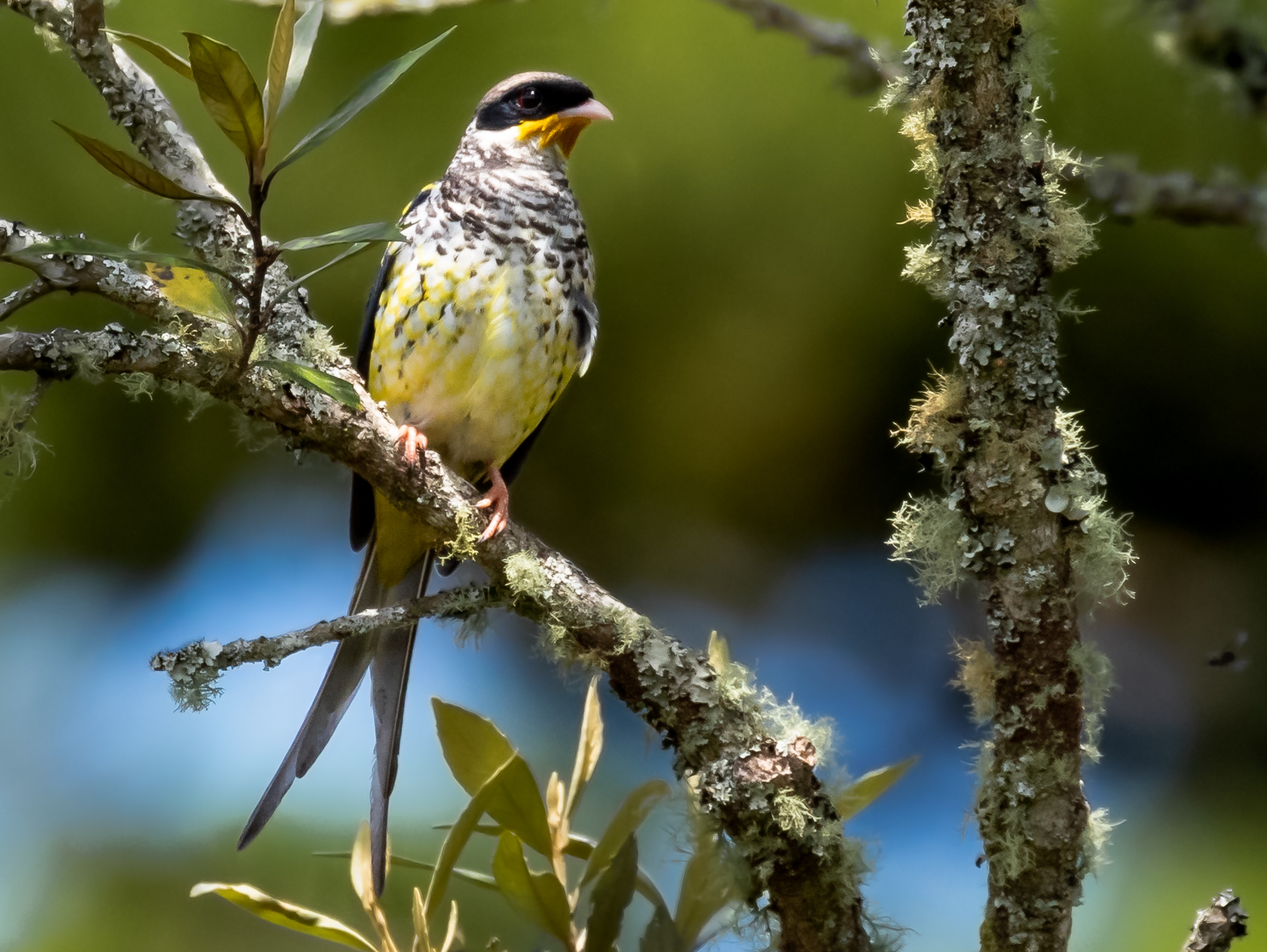

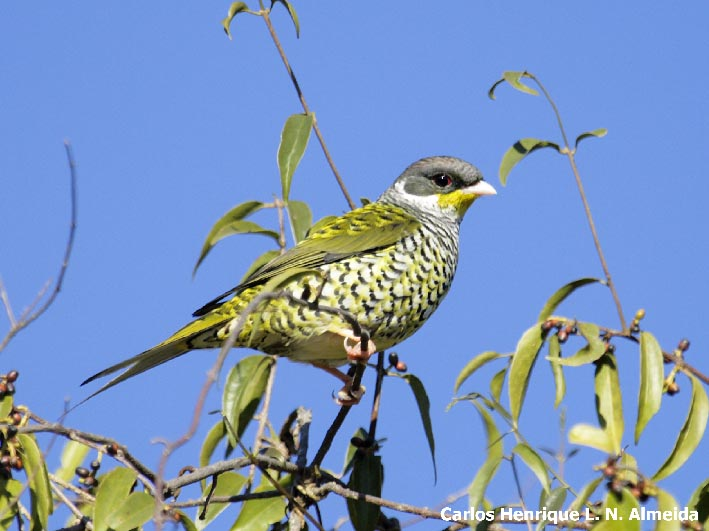
- Male above, female below (both in southeastern Brazil)

Conservation status
- Least Concern (IUCN 3.1)

Scientific classification
- Kingdom: Animalia
- Phylum: Chordata
- Class: Aves
- Order: Passeriformes
- Family: Cotingidae
- Genus: Phibalura; Vieillot, 1816
- Species: P. flavirostris

Binomial name
- Phibalura flavirostris Vieillot, 1816

= Swallow-tailed cotinga =

Species of bird

The swallow-tailed cotinga (Phibalura flavirostris) is a species of passerine bird in the family Cotingidae. It is found in Argentina, Brazil, and Paraguay.

== Taxonomy and systematics ==
The swallow-tailed cotinga was long considered to be a member of family Cotingidae. However, for a time some taxonomic systems were unsure and separated it as incertae sedis. A study published in 2014 firmly placed it in Cotingidae.

The swallow-tailed cotinga's further taxonomy is unsettled. The IOC and BirdLife International's Handbook of the Birds of the World (HBW) treat the taxon as a monotypic species. The South American Classification Committee and the Clements taxonomy assign it two subspecies, the nominate P. f. flavirostris (Vieillot, 1816) and P. f. boliviana (Chapman, 1930). The IOC and HBW treat boliviana as a separate species and assign it the English names Palkachupa cotinga and Apolo cotinga respectively.

This article follows the monotypic species model.

== Description ==
The swallow-tailed cotinga is about 18 to 20 cm (7.1 to 7.9 in) long and weighs about 43 to 60 g (1.5 to 2.1 oz). The sexes have different plumage though both have the eponymous long divided tail. Adult females have a mottled black and gray forehead, a pale gray to grayish brown crown with a usually concealed dull red streak in the middle. Their nape is blackish with broken white bars. Their upperparts are mostly dull olive with bright yellow forming a scaly appearance; their uppertail coverts are mostly olive-yellow with dark streaks. Their wings are mostly blackish brown with an olive green wash and feather edges. Their tail's upper side is blackish brown and its underside grayish; the feathers have yellow edges whose size decreases from the inner ones to the outer. Their lores are mottled gray and blackish and their ear coverts variably gray to blackish with a wide white stripe below them. Their throat is medium yellow with gray-brown spots. The rest of their underparts are blotchy white and yellow with brownish black to black tips on the feathers that form horizontal bars. Adult males are overall brighter and more boldly marked than females. Their crown is a dark navy blue with a mostly concealed crimson-red center. Their upperparts are yellowish to canary-yellow with navy blue barring. Their wings are deep bluish black with no olive wash. Their tail is black with less yellow than females' and its outer feathers are longer and more curved. Their lores and ear coverts are blackish blue and form a "mask". Their underparts are brighter yellow than females'. Both sexes have a deep red-brown iris with bare red skin surrounding the eye. Their bill is very short with a wide base and is pale straw-colored, pinkish white, or white. Their legs and feet are usually orange-yellow but may be ochre-yellow to bluish white.

== Distribution and habitat ==
The swallow-tailed cotinga has an odd disjunct distribution. It is found in southeastern Brazil, mostly from central Bahia, central Minas Gerais, and Espírito Santo south to Rio Grande do Sul and into northeastern Argentina's Misiones Province. Its range nominally includes eastern Paraguay though there are no records there since the late 1900s. A small separate population is in Goiás. The species inhabits somewhat open landscapes including the edges of extensive forest, partially wooded areas, meadows and roadsides with some trees, and gardens. In elevation it ranges from sea level to 2,000 m (6,600 ft).

== Behavior ==
=== Movement ===
The swallow-tailed cotinga is partially migratory. It is a year-round resident in most of Brazil, though it makes some elevational movements in that area. It breeds but does not winter in Rio Grande do Sul and winters but does not breed in Argentina; it apparently also was found in Paraguay only in winter.

=== Feeding ===
The swallow-tailed continga feeds mostly on fruit and also includes small numbers of insects in its diet. It often forages in flocks, and mostly in the forest's canopy but sometimes much nearer the ground. It takes food mostly by gleaning while perched and also takes insects with short sallies.

=== Breeding ===
The swallow-tailed cotinga breeds between September and February. Both sexes build the nest, a shallow cup made mostly of lichens with a few twigs included which is typically placed in the fork of a branch or on a wide horizontal branch. The clutch size is two or three eggs that are pastel green or greenish blue with brownish red spots and lines. Both sexes incubate the clutch though apparently only the female does so at night. The incubation period is not known. Fledging appears to occur about two weeks after hatch. Both sexes brood and provision nestlings.

=== Vocalization ===
The swallow-tailed cotinga is mostly silent. Two known calls are "a high guttural whistle, rendered gut, gut or similar [and] a tremolo". It also makes "a very low, slightly metallic pik note" while foraging.

== Status ==
The IUCN originally in 2012 assessed the swallow-tailed cotingha as Near Threatened and since 2022 as being of Least Concern. It has a large range; its estimated population of 20,000 to 50,000 mature individuals is believed to be decreasing. "Extensive deforestation has presumably had some impact, but its preference for forest borders, partially or lightly wooded areas, and clearings and gardens suggests that it can tolerate some habitat degradation." It is considered "nowhere very common" but does occur in a few protected areas in Brazil.
