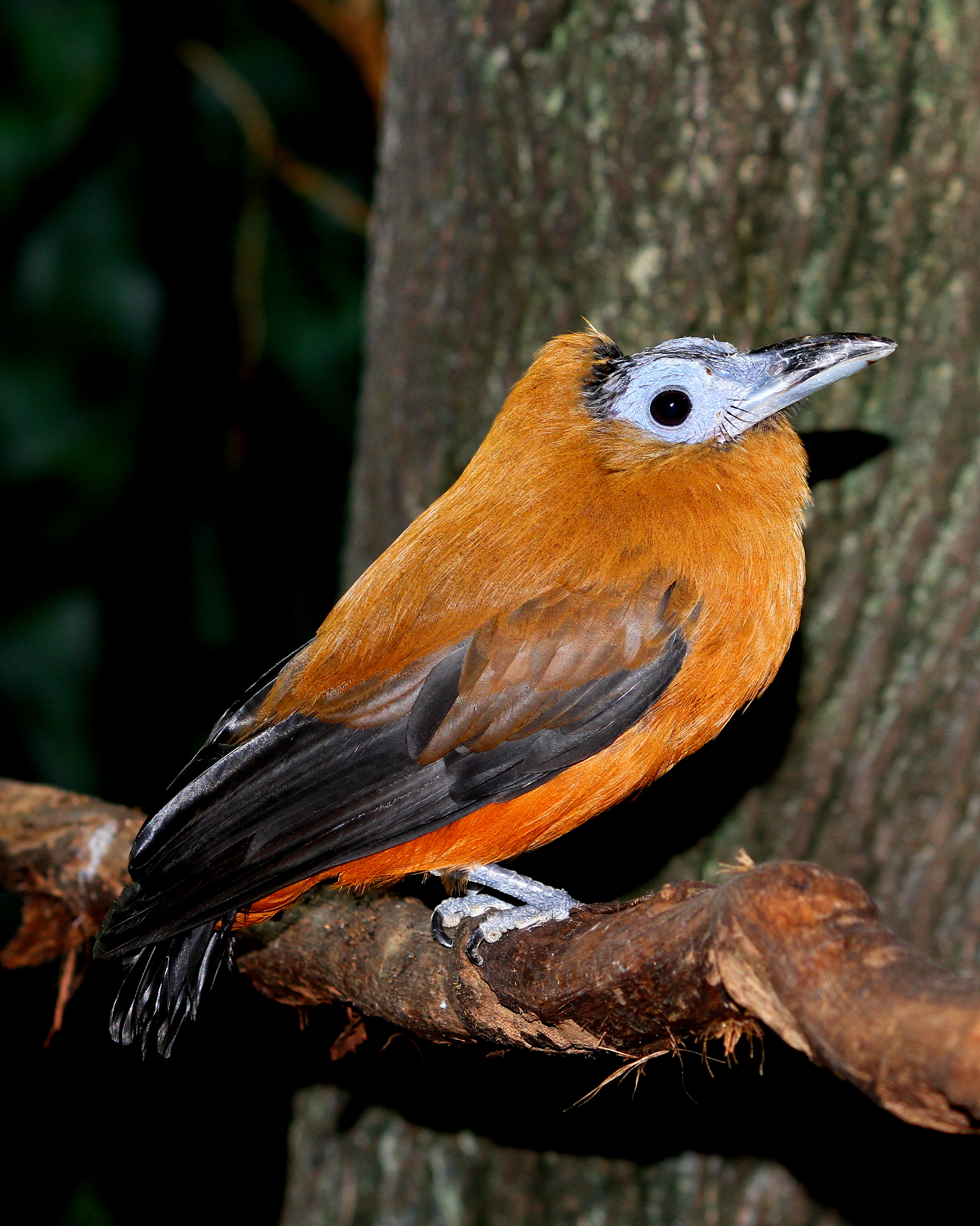

Conservation status
- Least Concern (IUCN 3.1)

Scientific classification
- Kingdom: Animalia
- Phylum: Chordata
- Class: Aves
- Order: Passeriformes
- Family: Cotingidae
- Genus: Perissocephalus; Oberholser, 1899
- Species: P. tricolor

Binomial name
- Perissocephalus tricolor (Müller, 1776)

= Capuchinbird =

Species of bird

The capuchinbird or calfbird (Perissocephalus tricolor) is a large passerine bird of the family Cotingidae. It is monotypic within the genus Perissocephalus. It is found in humid forests (up to 1,400 metres (4,600 ft) but mostly below 600 m) in north-eastern South America, almost entirely north of the Amazon River and east of Rio Negro (Colombia, Venezuela, Brazil and The Guianas).

== Description ==
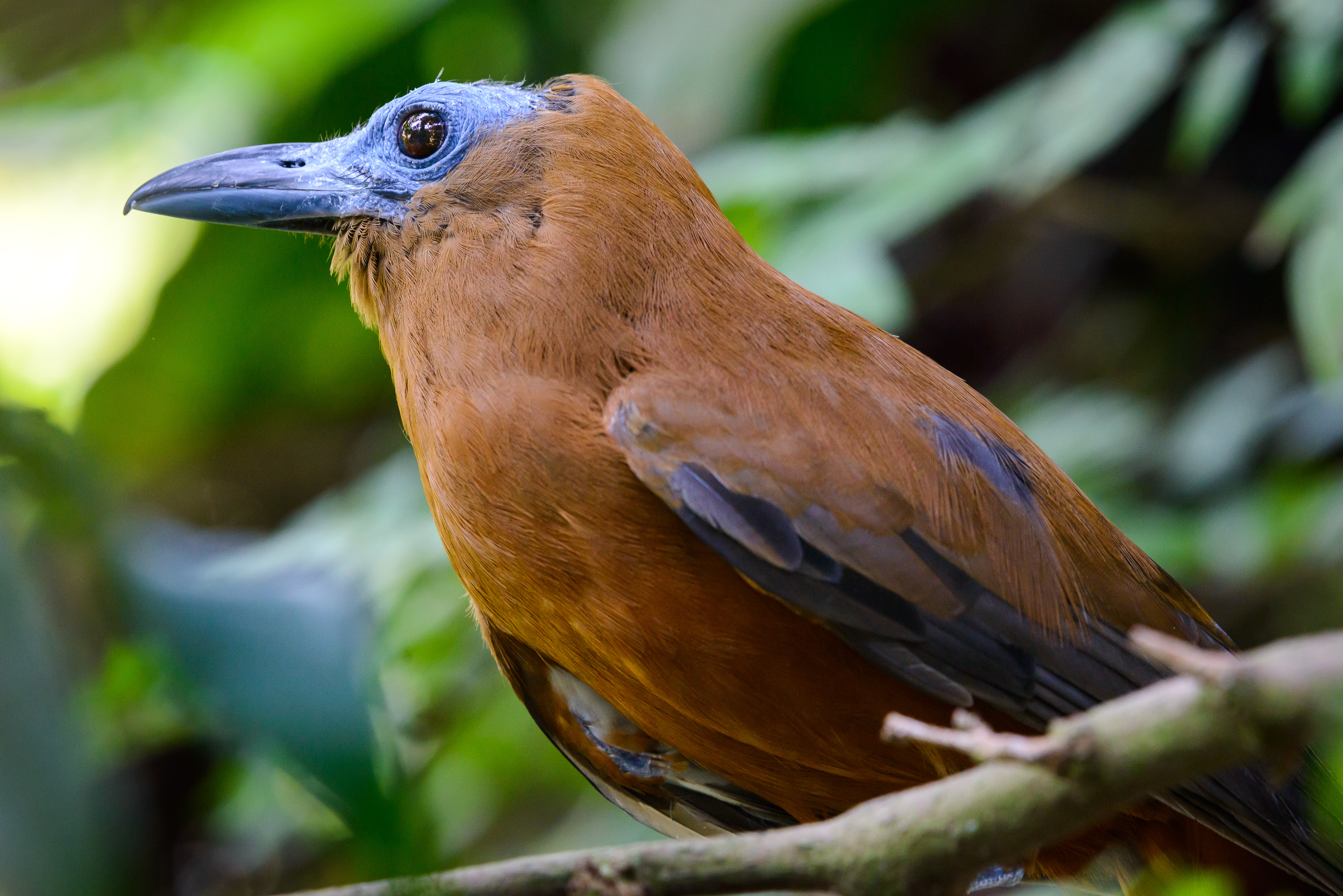

The capuchinbird is a large thick-set suboscine passerine with a relatively heavy bill. Adults weigh between 340 and 420 grams (12 and 15 oz) and are typically around 40 centimetres (16 in) long, making it the largest suboscine passerine, apart from the Amazonian and long-wattled umbrellabirds – indeed, females average larger than any female umbrellabird. Its plumage is overall rich brown, approaching orange on the belly and undertail coverts, and the remiges and short tail are black. The most distinctive feature is its bare, almost vulture-like head covered in dull blue skin. Juveniles resemble adults, with the exception of some downy feathers on the head.

== Ecology ==
A singing lek of capuchinbirds (Perissocephalus tricolor)

They gather in leks where they "sing". The "song" is very odd and difficult to describe accurately, although some have compared it to the distant sound of a chainsaw or (as indicated by its alternative name "calfbird") a young cow mooing. The nest is small and rather scanty and is normally found in close proximity to the lek. Capuchinbirds eat mainly fruits and insects.

== Status ==
The capuchinbird has a very wide distribution and although it is an uncommon bird, its total population is estimated to be large. The population may be in slight decline because of deforestation, but not at a fast enough rate for it to be considered threatened, so the International Union for Conservation of Nature has rated its conservation status as being of "least concern".
