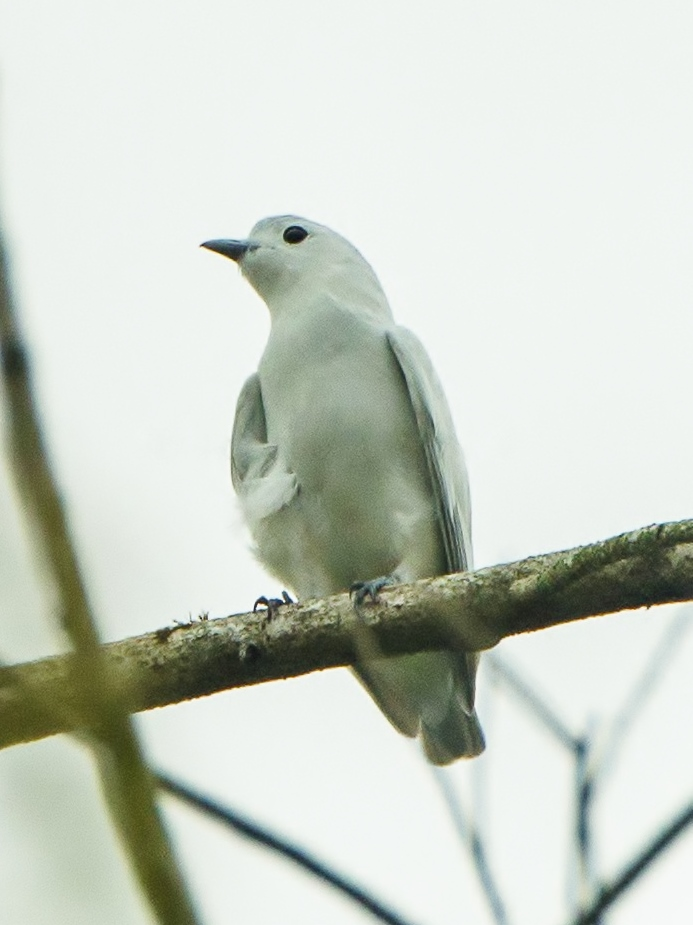

Conservation status
- Least Concern (IUCN 3.1)

Scientific classification
- Kingdom: Animalia
- Phylum: Chordata
- Class: Aves
- Order: Passeriformes
- Family: Cotingidae
- Genus: Carpodectes
- Species: C. nitidus

Binomial name
- Carpodectes nitidus Salvin, 1865

= Snowy cotinga =

Species of bird

The snowy cotinga (Carpodectes nitidus) is a medium-sized species of passerine bird in the family Cotingidae. It is found in Costa Rica, Honduras, Nicaragua, and Panama.

== Taxonomy and systematics ==
The snowy cotinga shares genus Carpodectes with the yellow-billed cotinga (C. antoniae) and the black-tipped cotinga (C. hopkei). One early twentieth century author treated them as conspecific but they have been otherwise treated as separate species. The three form a superspecies. The snowy cotinga is monotypic.

== Description ==
The snowy cotinga is 19.5 to 21 cm (7.7 to 8.3 in) long and weighs an average of 105 g (3.7 oz). The species is sexually dimorphic. Adult males are mostly white with a light bluish gray crown and a very light bluish gray wash on their upperparts and wings. Their flight feathers are wide and have rounded tips. Adult females have a brownish gray head and upperparts with a darker crown. Their tail is blackish. Their wings are mostly blackish with white to grayish white edges on the coverts and inner flight feathers. Their chin is a very light gray; the rest of their underparts are a paler gray than their upperparts that becomes white on the flanks, belly, and undertail coverts. Their secondaries are much thinner than the male's. Both sexes have an orange to dark brown iris and blackish legs and feet. Their gray bill has a wide base, a ridged culmen, and a notch on the tip of the maxilla. Immature birds of both sexes resemble adult females. Subadult males have almost adult plumage but have dark markings on the wing feathers and a gray wash on the rump and tail. The snowy cotinga is similar to the other two members of genus Carpodectes.

== Distribution and habitat ==
The snowy cotinga is found on the Caribbean lowlands from central Honduras south through Nicaragua and Costa Rica into western Bocas del Toro Province in extreme northwestern Panama. There are scattered records further north in Honduras and at least one sight record in extreme southern Guatemala. The species inhabits the canopy of humid evergreen forest and nearby secondary forest in the tropical zone. In elevation it ranges overall from sea level to 750 m (2,500 ft) though only rarely as high as 700 m (2,300 ft) in Costa Rica.

== Behavior ==
=== Movement ===
The snowy cotinga apparently wanders widely and is thought to make seasonal movements in Costa Rica.

=== Feeding ===
The snowy cotinga feeds on fruits; it favors those of Lauraceae, Loranthaceae mistletoes, and Ficus figs. It picks fruit while perched or with a brief sally from a perch.

=== Breeding ===
The only breeding records for the snowy cotinga are from Costa Rica. The nesting season there includes at least March and April. The only described nest was a small shallow cup made from twigs and woody tendrils on a limb that branched four ways. It and two other, undescribed, nests were between about 7.5 and 12 m (25 and 40 ft) above the ground. The only known clutch was one egg that was incubated for at least 27 days. The time to fledging and details of parental care are not known.

=== Vocalization ===
As of October 2025 xeno-canto had one recording of a snowy cotinga call; the Cornell Lab's Macaulay Library had no recordings. One author has described the call as "2–6 rapidly repeated notes, between chü and chee".

== Status ==
The IUCN has assessed the snowy cotinga as being of Least Concern. Its estimated population of between 20,000 and 50,000 mature individuals is believed to be decreasing. No immediate threats have been identified. It is considered very rare to rare in Honduras and uncommon in Costa Rica. Its "population undoubtedly [has been] reduced by recent destruction of lowland forest".
