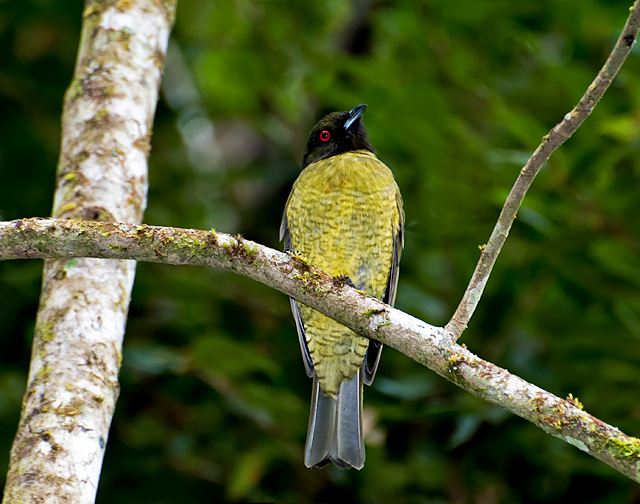

Conservation status
- Near Threatened (IUCN 3.1)

Scientific classification
- Kingdom: Animalia
- Phylum: Chordata
- Class: Aves
- Order: Passeriformes
- Family: Cotingidae
- Genus: Carpornis
- Species: C. melanocephala

Binomial name
- Carpornis melanocephala (Wied, 1820)

= Black-headed berryeater =

Species of bird

The black-headed berryeater (Carpornis melanocephala) is a Near Threatened species of bird in the family Cotingidae, the cotingas. It is endemic to Brazil.

== Taxonomy and systematics ==
The hooded berryeater was originally described as Procnias melanocephalus. Early in the twentieth century some authors placed it in genus Ampelion but by 1970 it was moved to its present genus Carpornis that had been erected in 1846.

The black-headed berryeater shares its genus with the hooded berryeater (C. cuculata). It is monotypic.

== Description ==
The black-headed berryeater is 20 to 21 cm (7.9 to 8.3 in) long; three individuals weighed between 63 to 67 g (2.2 to 2.4 oz). The sexes have almost identical plumage. Adult males have an entirely black head including the neck and throat with a very thin yellow "collar" around the sides and back of the neck. Their upperparts, wings, and tail are dull olive-green. Their underparts are mostly olive-yellow with fine dark olive bars and a plainer yellow lower belly. Adult females' heads have an olive wash. Both sexes have a fiery red to dark red iris, a blackish bill with a plumbeous base to the mandible, and gray legs and feet. Immatures are similar to adult females but have a dark gray head and a duller and more heavily barred throat and breast.

== Distribution and habitat ==
The black-headed berryeater is found intermittently in southeastern Brazil in Alagoas and from Bahia south to northeastern Paraná. It primarily inhabits humid forest and at one location is found in restinga. In elevation it mostly ranges from sea level to 500 m (1,600 ft) and locally occurs up to about 700 m (2,300 ft).

== Behavior ==
=== Movement ===
The black-headed berryeater is a year-round resident.

=== Feeding ===
The black-headed berryeater feeds primarily on fruit; there is one record of its eating a stick insect. It usually forages from the forest's mid-story to the subcanopy.

=== Breeding ===
The black-headed berryeater's breeding season includes September but is otherwise unknown. The one known nest was a shallow cup made from dry leaves and stems in a tree fork; it resembled a pile of leaf litter. It held one egg that was pale horn-colored with brown spots and stripes. The female alone incubated. The male remained nearby during incubation. The incubation period, time to fledging, and other details of parental care are not known.

=== Vocalization ===
The black-headed berryeater's song is a "high, gliding-down, indignant-sounding njauow".

== Status ==
The IUCN originally in 1988 assessed the black-headed berryeater as Threatened, then in 1994 as Vulnerable, and since August 2022 as Near Threatened. It has a fragmented range and its estimated population of between 2500 and 10,000 mature individuals is believed to be decreasing. "Given the species' low tolerance of converted habitats, it is severely threatened by forest loss. Extensive deforestation is continuing in this region and this species is now largely dependent on a few key protected areas." It is considered rare to uncommon. As of 2016 it occurred in 16 protected areas and was essentially absent outside them.
