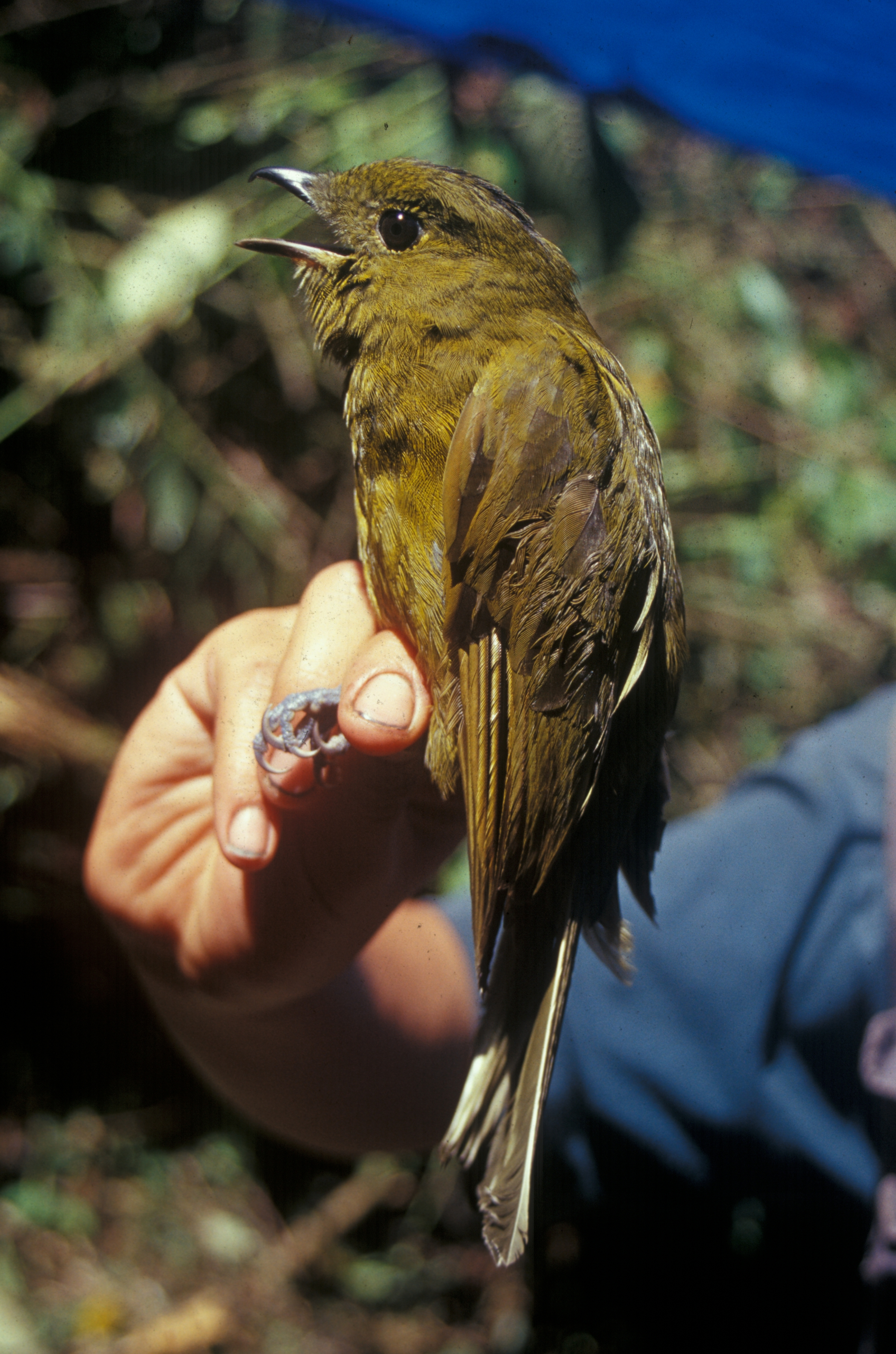

Conservation status
- Least Concern (IUCN 3.1)

Scientific classification
- Kingdom: Animalia
- Phylum: Chordata
- Class: Aves
- Order: Passeriformes
- Family: Cotingidae
- Genus: Snowornis
- Species: S. cryptolophus

Binomial name
- Snowornis cryptolophus (Sclater, PL & Salvin, 1877)

Synonyms
- See text

= Olivaceous piha =

Species of bird

The olivaceous piha (Snowornis cryptolophus) is a species of bird in the family Cotingidae, the cotingas. It is found in Colombia, Ecuador, and Peru.

== Taxonomy and systematics ==
The olivaceous piha was originally described as Lathria cryptolophia. It was later moved to genus Lipaugus and then back to Lathria. Because that genus already applied to species unrelated to subalaris, its current genus Snowornis was erected in 2001 for it and the similar grey-tailed piha (S. subalaris). The genus honors Dr. David W. Snow for his many contributions to the knowledge of the cotingas.

The olivaceous piha has two subspecies, the nominate S. c. crytolophus (Sclater, PL & Salvin, 1877) and S. c. mindoensis (Hellmayr & Seilern, 1914).

== Description ==
The olivaceous piha is 23 to 24 cm (9.1 to 9.4 in) long; three males weighed about 72 to 76 g (2.5 to 2.7 oz). The sexes have similar plumage. Adult males of the nominate subspecies have a mostly olive head with brighter olive ear coverts and a partially hidden black crest in the middle of the crown. Their upperparts are olive green that is brightest on the rump. Their tail is a browner to grayer olive than their upperparts with thin olive edges on the feathers. Their wings are mostly brown with thin olive edges on the flight feathers. Their underparts are mostly olive with thin white streaks from the lower throat to the belly and some lemon yellow undertail coverts. Adult females are much more brownish than males and have little or no crest on the crown. Subspecies S. c. mindoensis is smaller than the nominate with hidden creamy white bases to the crest feathers. Both sexes of both subspecies have a dark brown iris, a dark horn to black bill with a paler base to the mandible, and bluish gray to gray legs and feet.

== Distribution and habitat ==
The olivaceous piha has a disjunct distribution. Subspecies S. c. mindoensis has the smaller and more northerly range of the two. It is found on the western slope of Colombia's Western Andes from Antioquia Department south into northwestern Ecuador's Pichincha Province. The nominate subspecies is found from the upper valley of the Magdalena River in far southern Colombia south on the eastern slope of the Andes through Ecuador slightly into Peru and separately in Peru from central Amazonas Department south to Huánuco Department. It inhabits humid montane forest in the subtropical zone, where it mostly occurs from the forest's understory to its mid-story. In elevation it ranges between 1,000 and 2,300 m (3,300 and 7,500 ft) in Colombia, between 1,000 and 1,800 m (3,300 and 5,900 ft) in Ecuador, and between 1,350 and 2,300 m (4,400 and 7,500 ft) in Peru.

== Behavior ==
=== Movement ===
The olivaceous piha is a year-round resident.

=== Feeding ===
The olivaceous piha feeds on fruit and large arthropods but details are lacking. It usually forages singly and occasionally joins mixed-species feeding flocks. It perches and moves quietly and inconspicuously, taking prey and plucking fruit while perched or while briefly hovering after a short flight. It also takes prey in mid-air.

=== Breeding ===
The olivaceous piha's breeding season is not known but in northwestern Ecuador spans at least September to November. Its nest is a shallow cup made from twigs and plant tendrils placed in the fork of a tree branch. Two were respectively 4.5 and 9 m (15 and 30 ft) above the ground. Nothing else is known about the species' breeding biology.

=== Vocalization ===
As of August 2025 xeno-canto had five recordings of olivaceous piha vocalizations; the Cornell Lab's Macaulay Library had one of them and four others. Olivaceous piha vocalizations "remain one of the great mysteries of the avifauna of humid montane forest of the Andes". A "short rattle" has been attributed to the species by some recordists.

== Status ==
The IUCN has assessed the olivaceous piha as being of Least Concern. It has a large range; its population size is not known and is believed to be decreasing. No immediate threats have been identified. It is considered fairly common in Colombia, "scarce and local" in Ecuador, and uncommon in Peru. "As is the case generally with birds of humid montane forests, Olivaceous Piha is vulnerable to habitat loss, degradation, and fragmentation."
