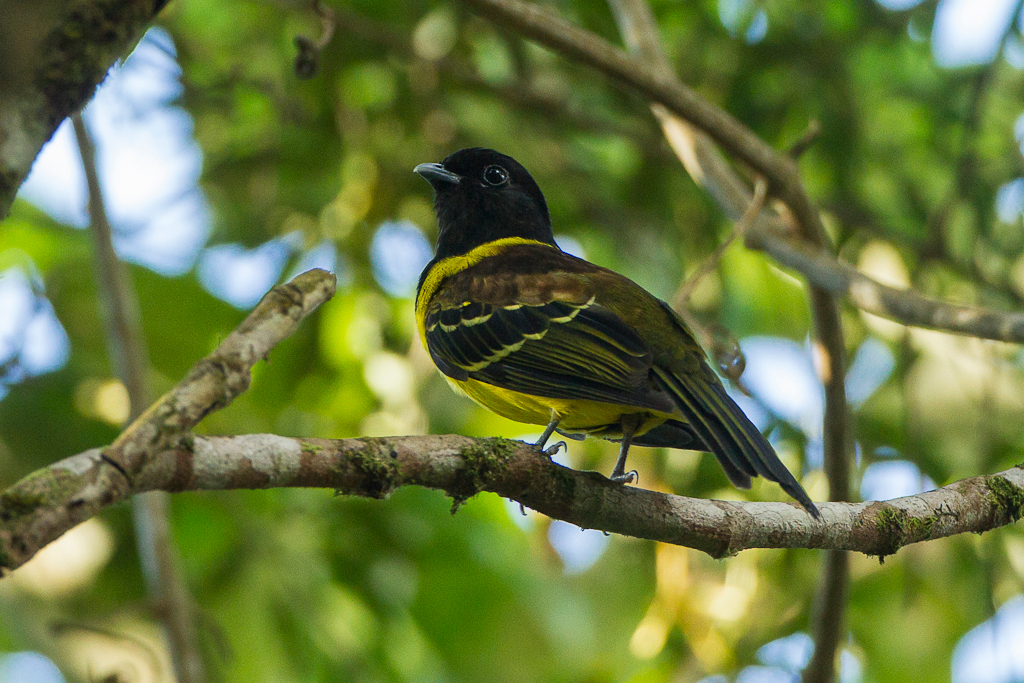

Conservation status
- Least Concern (IUCN 3.1)

Scientific classification
- Kingdom: Animalia
- Phylum: Chordata
- Class: Aves
- Order: Passeriformes
- Family: Cotingidae
- Genus: Carpornis
- Species: C. cucullata

Binomial name
- Carpornis cucullata (Swainson, 1821)

= Hooded berryeater =

Species of bird

The hooded berryeater (Carpornis cucullata) is a species of bird in the family Cotingidae, the cotingas. It is endemic to Brazil.

== Taxonomy and systematics ==
The hooded berryeater was originally described as Procnias cucullata. Early in the twentieth century some authors placed it in genus Ampelion but by 1970 it was moved to its present genus Carpornis that had been erected in 1846.

The hooded berryeater shares its genus with the black-headed berryeater (C. melanocephala). It is monotypic.

== Description ==
The hooded berryeater is 22.5 to 25 cm (8.9 to 9.8 in) long and weighs about 67 to 85 g (2.4 to 3.0 oz). The sexes have similar plumage. Adult males have an entirely black head, neck, and upper breast with a thin yellow "collar" around the sides and back of the neck. Their back is chestnut-tinged brown and their rump and uppertail coverts dull greenish olive. Their wings and tail are mostly blackish with olive-green edges on the feathers. The greater and median wing coverts have buffish yellow tips that form two wing bars. Their underparts below the upper breast are yellow. Adult females are overall duller than males. Their head and body have an olive wash, especially on the wings and tail. Their breast has faint olive bars. Both sexes have a dark brown iris and blue to violet-blue bill, legs, and feet. Juveniles are similar to adult females but have a dark gray head, green wing coverts, and a more heavily barred and duller yellow breast.

== Behavior ==
=== Movement ===
The hooded berryeater is a year-round resident.

=== Feeding ===
The hooded berryeater feeds primarily on fruit and includes some small insects in its diet. It usually forages singly, from the forest's mid-story to the subcanopy.

=== Breeding ===
The hooded berryeater's breeding season appears to include September and October, but nothing else is known about its breeding biology.

=== Vocalization ===
The hooded berryeater's song is a "soft, mellow, wrat? what-now".

== Status ==
The IUCN originally in 1994 assessed the hooded berryeater as Near Threatened. As of 2022 it has been rated as being of Least Concern. It has a large range; its population size is not known and is believed to be decreasing. Much of the habitat within its range has been destroyed. "Current key threats are urbanisation, industrialisation, agricultural expansion, colonisation and associated road-building." It is considered uncommon. It occurs in several protected areas. It "[f]avours primary forest and [is] sensitive to fragmentation, particularly shunning smaller-sized forest patches [and appears] to be a key species in maintaining ecological networks in Atlantic Forests".
