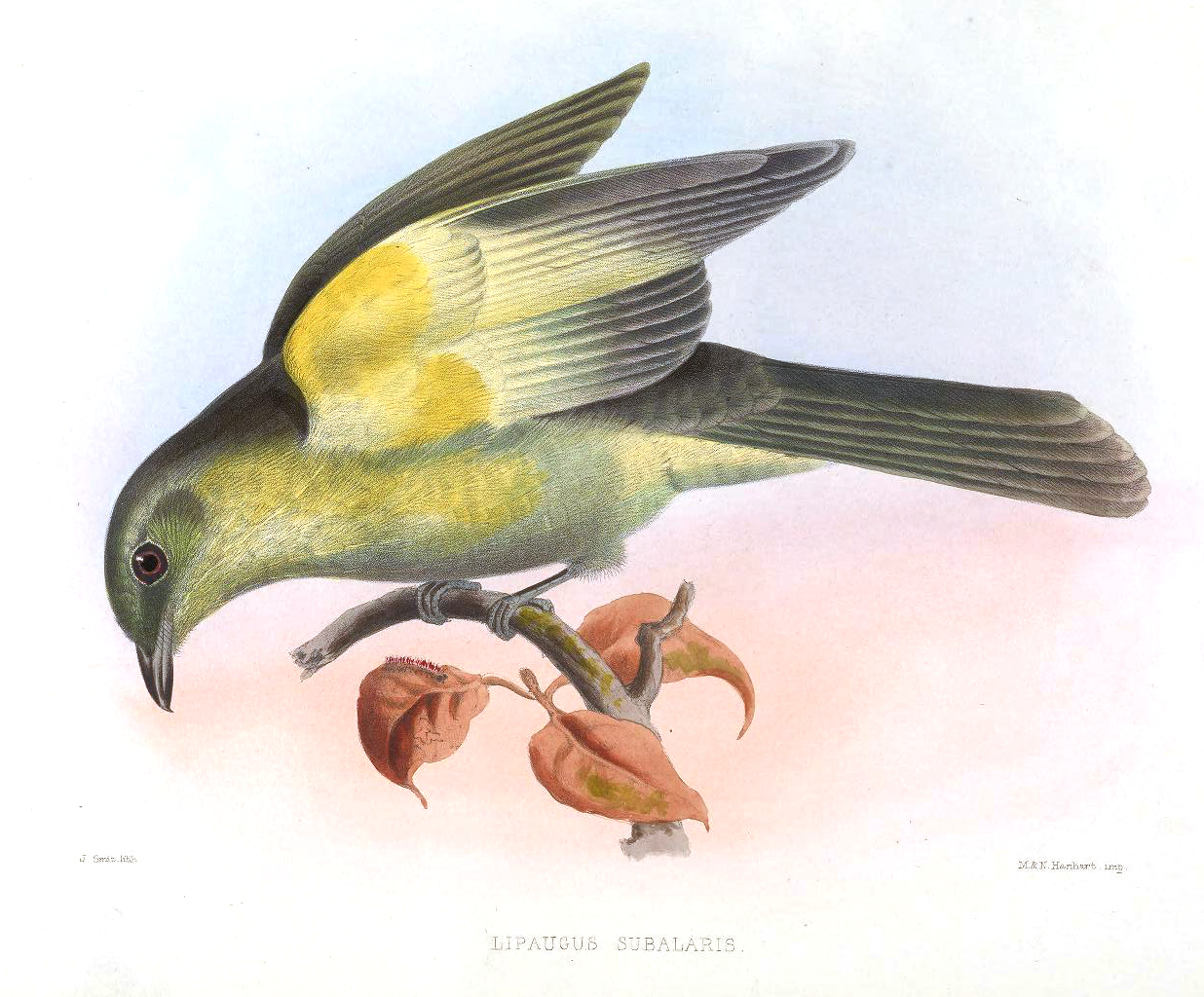

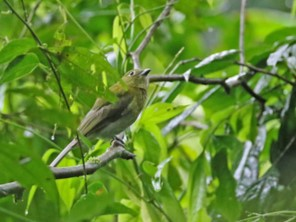

Conservation status
- Least Concern (IUCN 3.1)

Scientific classification
- Kingdom: Animalia
- Phylum: Chordata
- Class: Aves
- Order: Passeriformes
- Family: Cotingidae
- Genus: Snowornis
- Species: S. subalaris

Binomial name
- Snowornis subalaris (Sclater, PL, 1861)

Synonyms
- See text

= Grey-tailed piha =

Species of bird

The grey-tailed piha (Snowornis subalaris) is a species of bird in the family Cotingidae, the cotingas. It is found in Colombia, Ecuador and Peru.

== Taxonomy and systematics ==
The grey-tailed piha was originally described as Lipaugus subalaris. In 1990 it was moved to genus Lathria. Because that genus already applied to species unrelated to subalaris, its current genus Snowornis was erected in 2001 for it and the similar olivaceous piha (S. cryptolophus). The genus honors Dr. David W. Snow for his many contributions to the knowledge of the cotingas.

The grey-tailed piha is monotypic.

== Description ==
The grey-tailed piha is 23 to 24 cm (9.1 to 9.4 in) long and weighs about 70 to 90 g (2.5 to 3.2 oz). The sexes have similar plumage. Adult males have a mostly olive head with blackish lores, yellow flecks on the ear coverts, a thin pale eye-ring, and a partially hidden black crest in the middle of the crown. Their upperparts are mostly bright olive green. Their uppertail coverts and tail are ash gray. Their wings are mostly grayish brown with olive coverts, tertials, and the edges of the secondaries. Their throat is pale yellow that blends to bright yellow olive on the breast; the feathers of both areas have almost invisible pale streaks. Their belly is gray and their undertail coverts yellowish white. Adult females have little or no crest on the crown. Both sexes have a dark brown iris, a dark horn to black bill with a paler base to the mandible, and bluish gray to gray legs and feet.

== Distribution and habitat ==
The grey-tailed piha is found on the eastern slope of the Andes from far southwestern Colombia south through Ecuador into far northwestern Peru and further south in Peru intermittently to Madre de Dios Department. In much of Peru it occurs on outlying ridges rather than the main chain of the Andes. It inhabits humid montane forest in the foothills and lower subtropical zones, where it mostly occurs from the forest's understory to its mid-story. In elevation it ranges between 600 and 1,500 m (2,000 and 4,900 ft) in Colombia, between 500 and 1,400 m (1,600 and 4,600 ft) in Ecuador, and between 800 and 1,350 m (2,600 and 4,400 ft) in Peru.

== Behavior ==
=== Movement ===
The grey-tailed piha is a year-round resident.

=== Feeding ===
The grey-tailed piha feed son fruit and arthropods but details are lacking. It usually forages singly and seldom joins mixed-species feeding flocks. It perches and moves quietly and inconspicuously, taking prey and plucking fruit while perched or while briefly hovering after a short flight. It also takes prey in mid-air.

=== Breeding ===
The grey-tailed piha's breeding season is unknown but apparently includes April. Males have been observed displaying in what could be a lek. Nothing else is known about the species' breeding biology.

=== Vocalization ===
The male grey-tailed piha's song is "a clear and ringing cheeeer-yeeéng!" whose second syllable has a higher pitch than the first. It is loud and typically sung with long intervals between songs. The species also makes a "softer and shorter version, chureeee?" that might be by the female.

== Status ==
The IUCN has assessed the grey-tailed piha as being of Least Concern. It has a large range; its population size is not known and is believed to be decreasing. "The only threat known to the species is the loss and fragmentation of its forest habitat." It is considered uncommon in Colombia, "scarce and local" in Ecuador, and "local but can be fairly common" in Peru.
