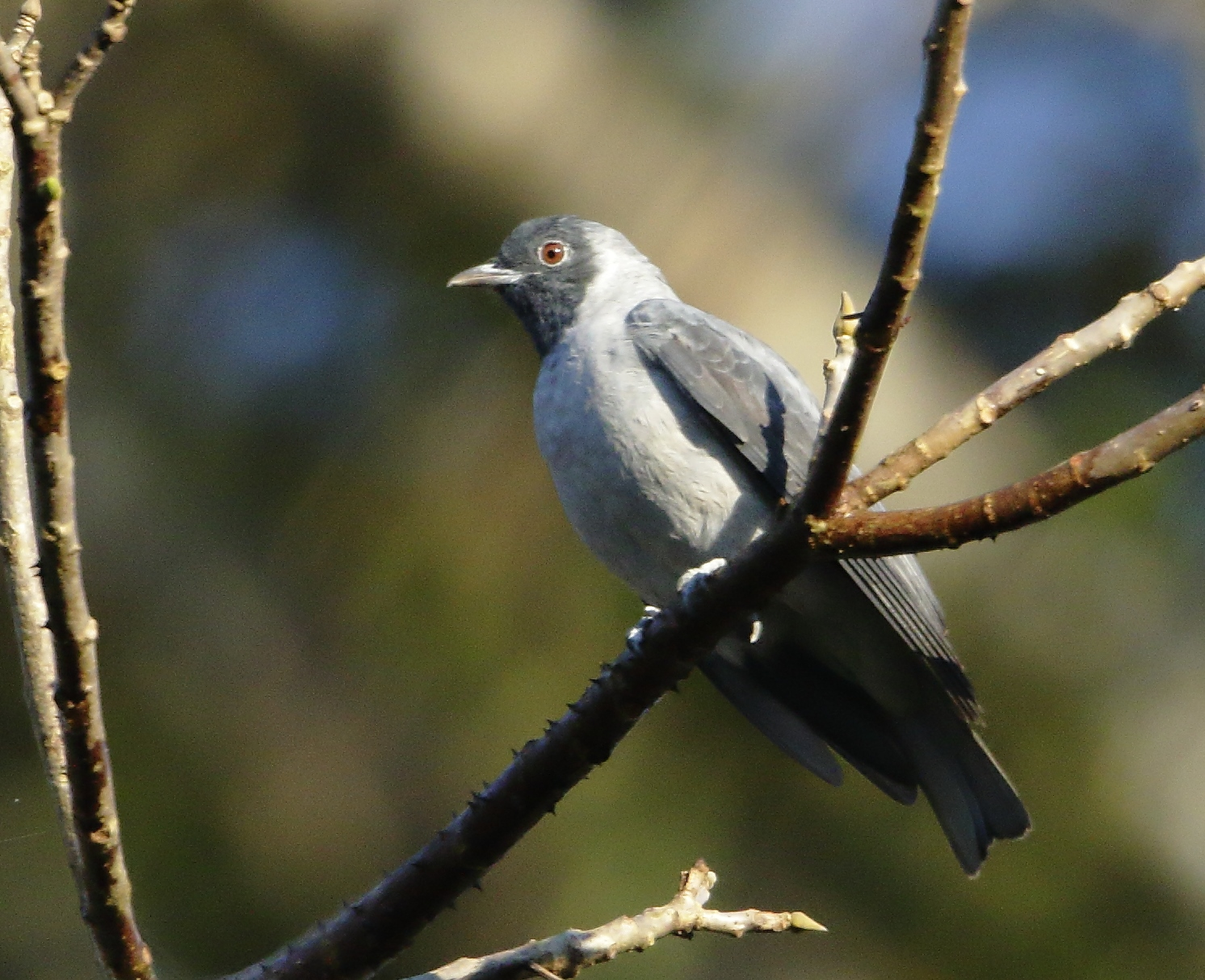
- at Rio Branco, Acre, Brazil

Conservation status
- Least Concern (IUCN 3.1)

Scientific classification
- Kingdom: Animalia
- Phylum: Chordata
- Class: Aves
- Order: Passeriformes
- Family: Cotingidae
- Genus: Conioptilon; Lowery & O'Neill, 1966
- Species: C. mcilhennyi

Binomial name
- Conioptilon mcilhennyi Lowery & O'Neill, 1966

= Black-faced cotinga =

Species of bird

The black-faced cotinga (Conioptilon mcilhennyi) is a species of bird in the family Cotingidae. It is found in Bolivia, Brazil, and Peru.

== Taxonomy and systematics ==
The black-faced cotinga was first described by George Lowery and John O'Neill in 1966 and placed in a new genus. They assigned the specific epithet mcilhennyi to recognize John. S. McIlhenny, "who sponsored the Louisiana State University 1964-65 Peruvian Expedition" during which the first specimens were obtained. A large molecular phylogenetic study of the suboscines published in 2020 found that the black-faced cotinga was sister to the bare-necked fruitcrow (Gymnoderus foetidusi).

The black-faced cotinga remains the only member of genus Conioptilon and has no subspecies.

== Description ==
The black-faced cotinga is 23 to 25 cm (9.1 to 9.8 in) long; three individuals weighed 81 to 89 g (2.9 to 3.1 oz). Adult males have a mostly black head and throat with a white crescent behind the ear coverts. Their upperparts are dark gray and their wings and tail an even darker gray. Their breast is a lighter gray that becomes white on the lower belly and undertail coverts. Almost unique among passerine birds, their unfeathered parts havehite powder down and the upper surfaces of their wings and tail were also powdery. The sexes are almost alike; females are slightly smaller than males and appear to have slightly paler underparts. Both sexes have a dark reddish-brown iris, a dark grayish brown bill with a slight hook on the tip, and dark olive-gray legs and feet.

== Distribution and habitat ==
The black-faced cotinga has a "curiously restricted" distribution. The largest part of its range is in the eastern Peruvian departments of Ucayali, Madre de Dios, and Cuzco. There it is found primarily north of the Madre de Dios River. Its range extends east into far western Brazil's Acre state, where it occurs along the upper Jurua River, and into far northern Bolivia's Pando Department. The species inhabits humid forest, especially areas that are swampy or seasonally flooded around lakes and along rivers. Though it favors várzea in Brazil, it also occurs in terra firme and burned forest there. In elevation it mostly occurs below 300 m (1,000 ft) and only rarely reaches 450 m (1,500 ft).

== Behavior ==
=== Movement ===
The black-faced cotinga is believed to be a year-round resident.

=== Feeding ===
The black-faced cotinga feeds mostly on fruit and also includes insects and possibly flowers in its diet. It plucks fruit while briefly hovering after a sally from a perch. It typically forages singly or in pairs. It does not join mixed-species feeding flocks but often feeds with other species in fruiting trees, especially larger Ficus figs.

=== Breeding ===
The black-faced cotinga's breeding season has not been defined but includes August and September. The only two known nests were bowls made from thin plant fibers. Both were in branch forks, one of them about 15 m (50 ft) and the other about 35 m (115 ft) above the ground. One of them had a nestling that was being provisioned by both parents. Nothing else is known about the species' breeding biology.

=== Vocalization ===
The black-faced cotinga's vocalizations include a "short, barked puh, a quiet, descending coww, and [a] squeaky, rising huuEEE?". The last is also described as a "short, surprised-sounding wuèèèèh, gliding up to three notes higher".

== Status ==
The IUCN has assessed the black-faced cotinga as being of Least Concern. Its population size is not known and is believed to be decreasing. "Though its lowland forests are relatively intact, the region has been subject to selective logging and is being opened up for development, with oil/gas extraction and mining, and associated road building and human colonisation, resulting in further degradation." It is considered uncommon in Peru and occurs in Manu National Park in that country.
