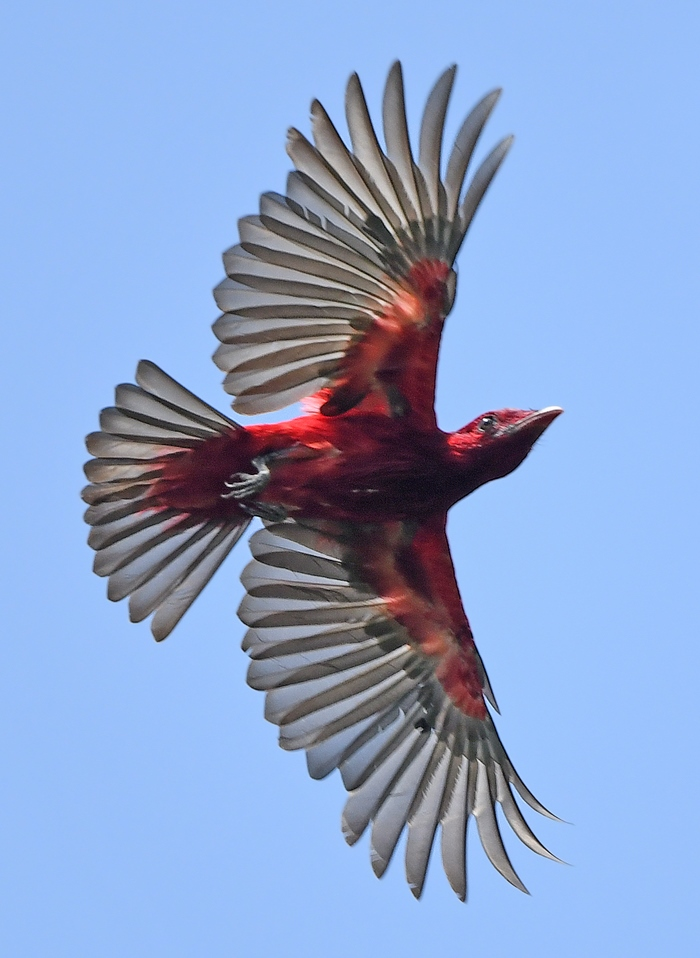

Conservation status
- Least Concern (IUCN 3.1)

Scientific classification
- Kingdom: Animalia
- Phylum: Chordata
- Class: Aves
- Order: Passeriformes
- Family: Cotingidae
- Genus: Haematoderus; Bonaparte, 1854
- Species: H. militaris

Binomial name
- Haematoderus militaris (Shaw, 1792)
- native range

= Crimson fruitcrow =

Species of bird

The crimson fruitcrow (Haematoderus militaris) is a species of bird in the large family Cotingidae, not a crow. The only member of the genus Haematoderus, it is found in Brazil, French Guiana, Guyana, Suriname, and Venezuela. Its natural habitat is subtropical or tropical moist lowland forests. Because of its large range and population density this species is not classified as vulnerable.

== Description ==
The crimson fruitcrow is a large bird about 34 centimetres (13 in) long. The adult male has glossy crimson plumage on head, back and breast, the feathers being long and stiff. A bushy crimson crest is sometimes raised. The wings and tail are dark brown to black, the tail being partly concealed by the long tail-coverts. The female and the immature male have a paler crimson head, throat and underparts, the back, wings and tail being dark brown and the feathers being more flexible. Both sexes have thick, dark red beaks.

== Distribution ==
This species is native to the tropical, lowland rainforests of Guyana, French Guiana and northeastern Brazil. There have been occasional sightings outside its normal range, in west Brazil and east Venezuela. It is an uncommon species and is present in the forest canopy and at the verges of woodland.

== Behaviour ==
Despite its name, this fruitcrow feeds mainly on large insects such as cicadas, beetles and grasshoppers; it supplements this diet with fruit. Its flight is leisurely and looping, and a display flight, involving ascending in a corkscrew fashion followed by a long glide, has been documented. It perches high in the canopy, each bird seeming to have a favoured spot. Although usually silent, this bird can emit a low hoot reminiscent of an owl, and also has a sharp "bok" call.

== Status ==
The crimson fruitcrow is generally rather uncommon and patchy in its distribution, and its population size may be declining slowly. However, it has a very extensive range, and the International Union for Conservation of Nature does not consider it threatened and has assessed its conservation status as being of "least concern".
