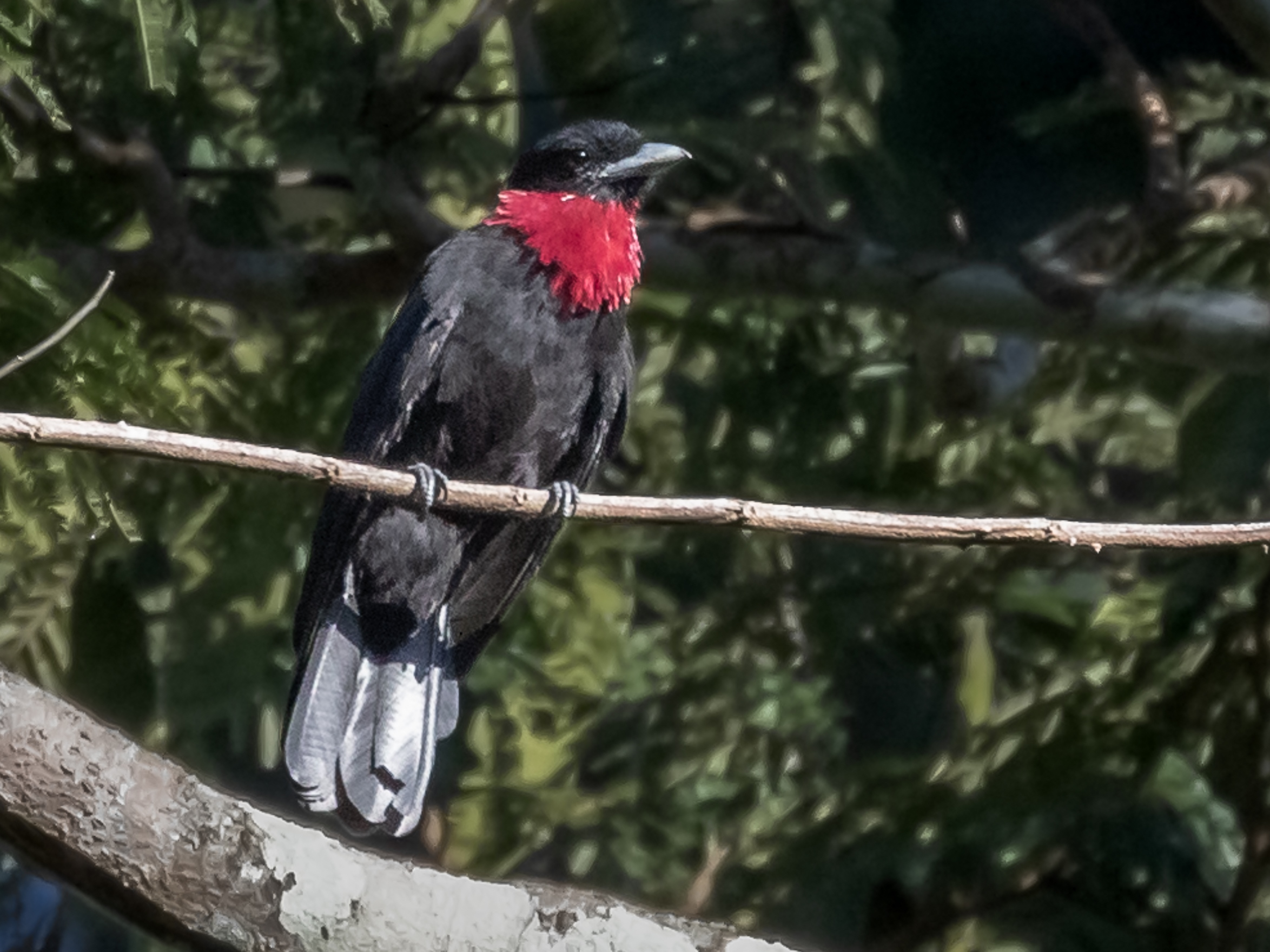
- Male

Conservation status
- Least Concern (IUCN 3.1)

Scientific classification
- Kingdom: Animalia
- Phylum: Chordata
- Class: Aves
- Order: Passeriformes
- Family: Cotingidae
- Genus: Querula; Vieillot, 1816
- Species: Q. purpurata

Binomial name
- Querula purpurata (Müller, 1776)

= Purple-throated fruitcrow =

Species of bird

The purple-throated fruitcrow (Querula purpurata) is a species of bird in the family Cotingidae, the cotingas. It is found in Costa Rica, Panama, Nicaragua, and in every mainland South American country except Argentina, Chile, Paraguay, and Uruguay.

== Taxonomy and systematics ==
The purple-throated fruitcrow was originally described as Muscicapa purpurata, mistakenly placing it with the Old World flycatchers. It was eventually moved to its present genus Querula that was erected in 1816. It is the only member of that genus and has no subspecies.

== Description ==
The purple-throated fruitcrow is 25 to 30 cm (9.8 to 12 in) long and weighs 91 to 133 g (3.2 to 4.7 oz). Adult males have glossy black upperparts and duller black underparts. Their throat feathers are dark reddish purple; they are long and square-tipped and form a "shield" to the sides and upper breast. Adult females are overall dull black and lack the shield though they may have a few crimson feathers on the throat. Both sexes have a dark brown iris, a pale gray or silver gray bill with a black tip, and dusky gray to black legs and feet. Juveniles have a dull black crown, wings, and tail. They are otherwise brownish black with faint indistinct black bars.

== Distribution and habitat ==
The purple-throated fruitcrow has a disjunct distribution. One population is found in Central America from southeastern Nicaragua south along the Caribbean side of Costa Rica and Panama and also on the Pacific side of Panama from the Canal Zone south. Its range continues across north-central Colombia and the valleys of the Cauca and Magdalena rivers and south along the western slope of the Andes through Colombia into northwestern Ecuador as far as northern Los Ríos Province and spottily beyond. A second population is found from southeastern Venezuela east through the Guianas and extreme northern Brazil to the Atlantic in Amapá state. That range continues south in eastern Brazil to western Maranhão and Tocantins and from there west across southern Amazonian Brazil to the Andes in southeastern Colombia, eastern Ecuador, eastern Peru, and northern Bolivia. According to some sources it skirts a wide band of northern Amazonia. However, van Perlo's field guide shows the species occupying the entirety of the Amazon Basin.

The purple-throated fruitcrow inhabits lowland evergreen forest in the tropical zone, where it prefers the forest's midstory to canopy. In elevation it ranges from sea level to 500 m (1,600 ft) in Costa Rica and 1,400 m (4,600 ft) in Colombia, mostly below 500 m (1,600 ft) on both sides of Ecuador, up to 1,000 m (3,300 ft) in Peru, up to 500 m (1,600 ft) in Venezuela, and from sea level to 750 m (2,500 ft) in Brazil.

== Behavior ==
=== Movement ===
The purple-throated fruitcrow is a year-round resident.

=== Feeding ===
The purple-throated fruitcrow feeds primarily on fruit; adults also feed on large insects and feed nestlings mostly insects. The species typically forages in small groups (up to eight individuals) that usually stay to themselves but sometimes mix with other large species. They feed mostly in the forest's midstory to the canopy and take most fruit and insects with short sallies from a perch. Some fruits are taken while perched. They tend to regurgitate fruit seeds away from where they eat, "providing an effective method of seed dispersal for the plants it feeds on".

=== Breeding ===
The purple-throated fruitcrow breeds mostly in the local wet season, including July and October in Panama, March and June in Colombia, March in Venezuela, and February and April in the Guianas. Males make what is thought to be a courtship display by spreading their throat shield and shivering their tail. The species' nest is a cup or platform made from sticks lined with very fine twigs. It typically is placed in a branch fork between about 11 and 23 m (35 and 75 ft) above the ground. Both sexes build the nest. The clutch is one dark olive egg. Incubation takes about 25 days and fledging occurs 32 to 33 days after hatch. Both sexes provision nestlings. The species is a cooperative breeder and unrelated adults contribute to the provisioning. The social groups also contribute to defending the nest from predators.

=== Vocal and non-vocal sounds ===
The purple-throated fruitcrow has a wide variety of vocalizations. Its songs have been described as "a mellow, mewing, falling-rising COW-uh?" and "a rising ohhahhh?", and its call as "a raspy coughing or 'throat-clearing' sound". Other calls are described as "a drawn-out ooo-waáh or kwih-oo, ooo-waáh" and in flight a "wah-wah-wheéeawoo". Nearby observers can sometimes hear wingbeats.

== Status ==
The IUCN has assessed the purple-throated fruitcrow as being of Least Concern. It has an extremely large range; its estimated population of at least five million mature individuals is believed to be decreasing. No immediate threats have been identified. It is considered fairly common in Costa Rica, Peru, and Venezuela and common in Colombia, Ecuador, and Brazil.
