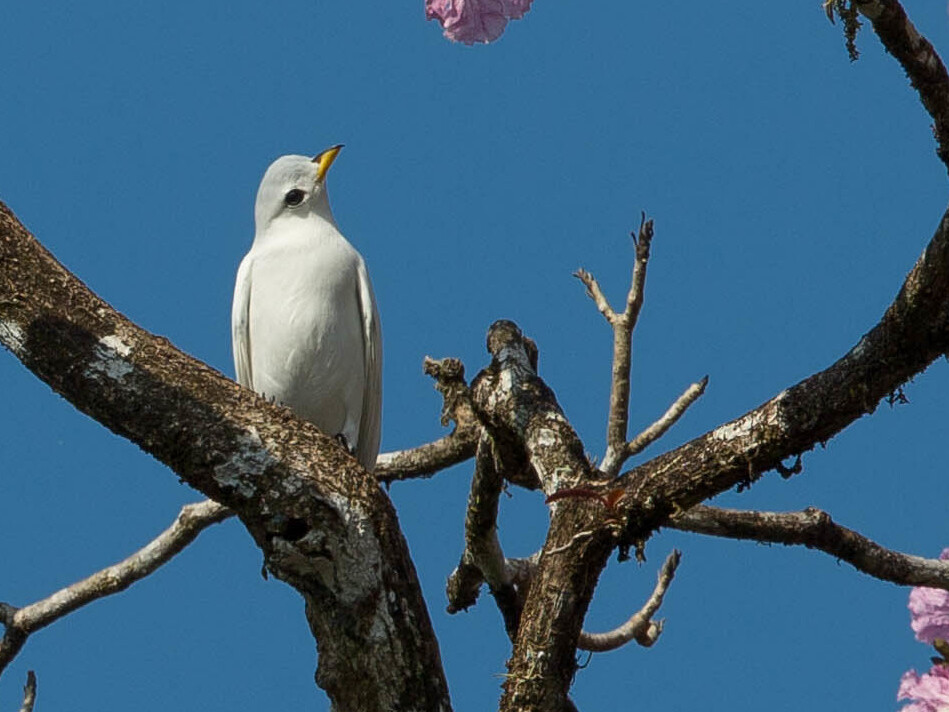

Conservation status
- Near Threatened (IUCN 3.1)

Scientific classification
- Kingdom: Animalia
- Phylum: Chordata
- Class: Aves
- Order: Passeriformes
- Family: Cotingidae
- Genus: Carpodectes
- Species: C. antoniae

Binomial name
- Carpodectes antoniae Ridgway, 1884

= Yellow-billed cotinga =

Species of bird

The yellow-billed cotinga (Carpodectes antoniae) is a species of bird in the family Cotingidae. It is found in the Pacific lowlands of Costa Rica and Panama. Its natural habitats are subtropical or tropical moist lowland forest, subtropical or tropical mangrove forest, and subtropical or tropical moist shrubland. It is threatened by habitat destruction.

== Description ==
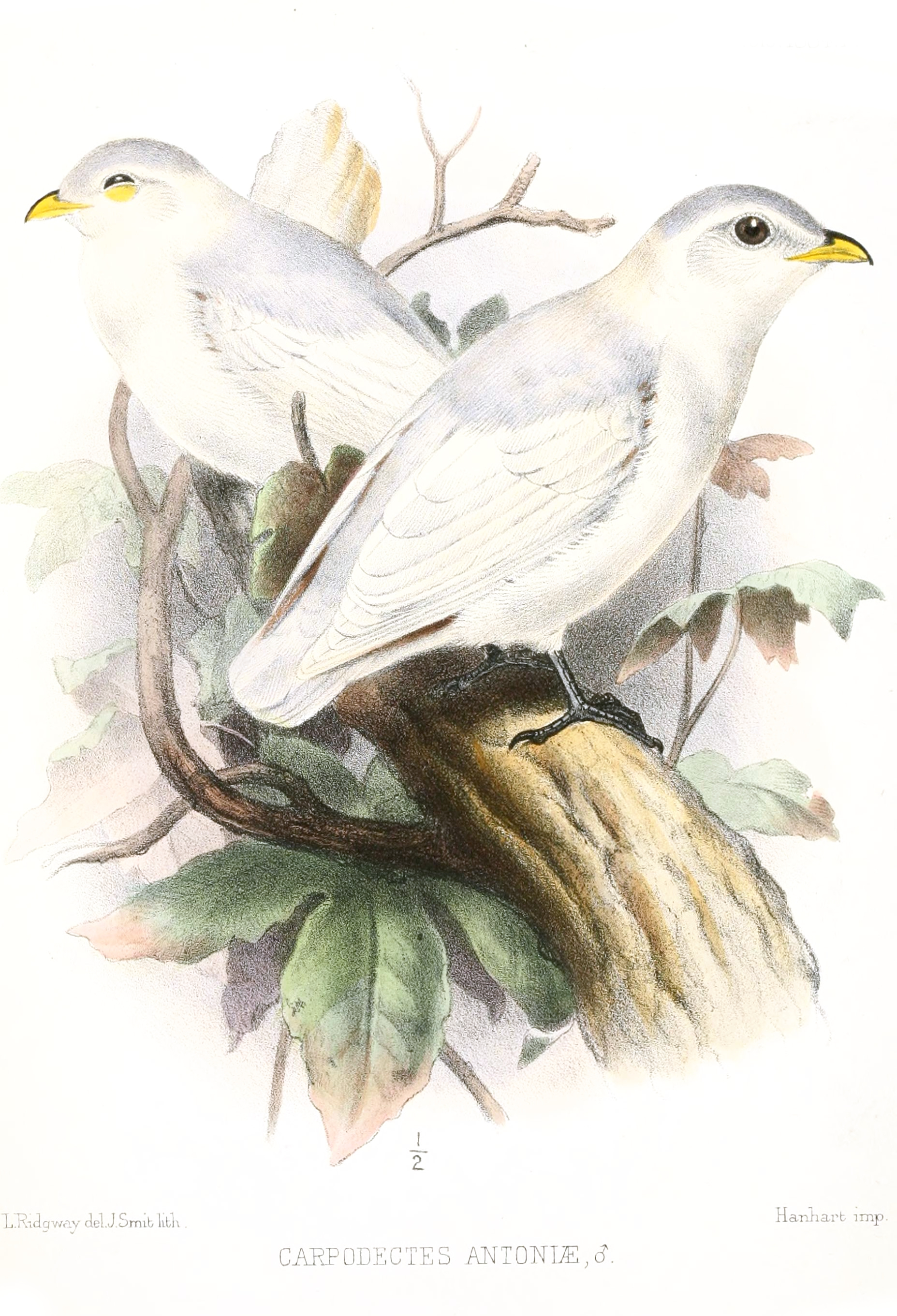

The yellow-billed cotinga grows to an adult length of about 8 inches (20 cm). The male has the crown of the head suffused with pearly-grey, but otherwise the plumage closely resembles the much more common snowy cotinga (Carpodectes nitidus), being pure white. However, this bird has a yellow beak, rather than the bluish-grey bill of the snowy cotinga. The female resembles the female snowy cotinga, with its pale brownish-grey upper parts, and greyish-white underparts; it also has a yellow beak.

== Distribution and habitat ==
The yellow-billed cotinga is endemic to the Pacific coast of Costa Rica and the extreme west of Panama. It occurs in a number of small, separate enclaves, the most northerly of which is in Costa Rica at the mouth of the Tárcoles River and in the Carara National Park nearby. The largest populations are in the area of the Golfo Dulce and the Osa Peninsula, and the main nesting area is at the mouth of the Sierpe River. There are several other locations in Costa Rica where it occurs and it has been seen in Panama, but sightings there are sporadic. It mostly inhabits mangrove forests but is sometimes seen in scrubland and adjacent lowland forests, and occasionally in isolated trees in more open countryside.

== Behaviour ==
The behaviour of this bird has been little studied. The males (and sometimes the females) perch high in trees by the Sierpe River and fly back and forth low over the water. A swooping form of flight has been observed which is possibly a courtship display.

== Status ==
Although no exact count has been made of these birds, it is estimated that there are between 150 and 700 mature individuals in total, and that the population is declining. The chief threat they face is the destruction of the mangrove forests in which they live for conversion of the land into shrimp ponds, pasture and rice cultivation. Inland from the mangroves, much of the lowland forest has been felled and the construction of roads and dykes has changed the hydrology of the area. For these reasons, the International Union for Conservation of Nature has assessed the conservation status of this bird as near threatened.
