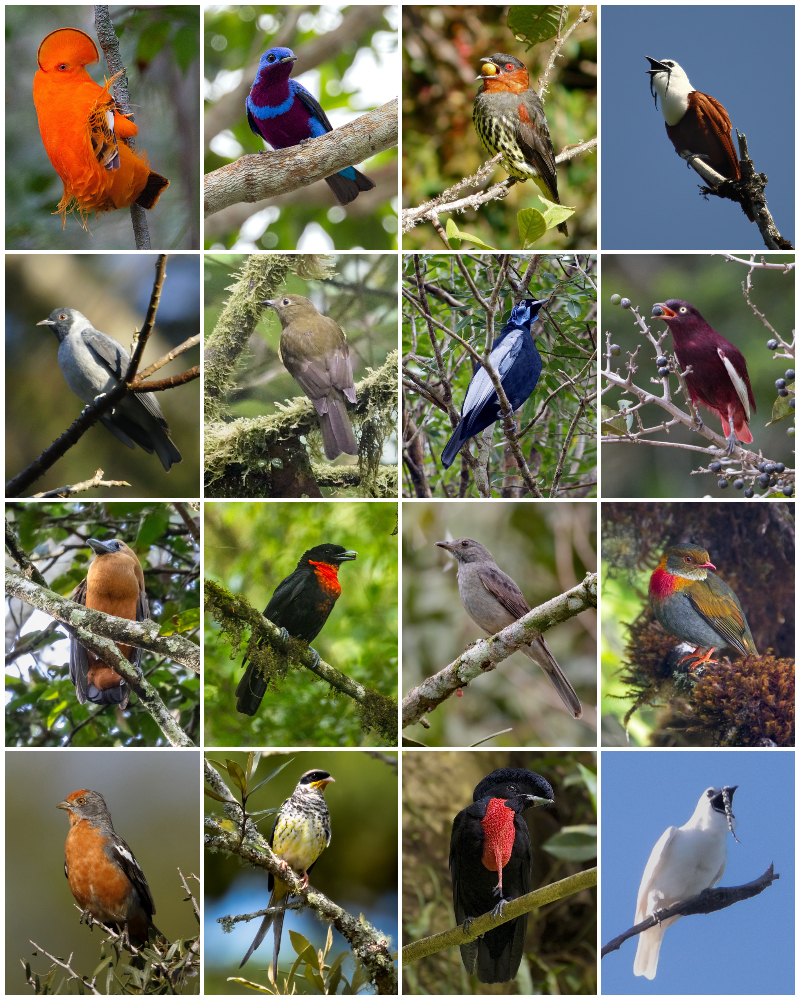
- Diversity of Cotingidae

Scientific classification
- Kingdom: Animalia
- Phylum: Chordata
- Class: Aves
- Order: Passeriformes
- Parvorder: Tyrannida
- Family: Cotingidae; Bonaparte, 1849

Genera
- Many, see text
- Geographical range of the cotingas.

= Cotinga =

Cotingas

Passerine bird family found in Central and South America

The cotingas are a large family, Cotingidae, of suboscine passerine birds found in Central America and tropical South America. Cotingas are birds of forests or forest edges, that are primarily frugivorous. They all have broad bills with hooked tips, rounded wings, and strong legs. They range in size from 12–13 cm (4.7–5.1 in) of the fiery-throated fruiteater (Pipreola chlorolepidota) up to 48–51 cm (19–20 in) of the Amazonian umbrellabird (Cephalopterus ornatus).

== Description ==
Cotingas vary widely in social structure. There is a roughly 50/50 divide in the family between species with biparental care, and those in which the males play no part in raising the young. The purple-throated fruitcrow lives in mixed-sex groups in which one female lays an egg and the others help provide insects to the chick.

In cotinga species where only the females care for the eggs and young, the males have striking courtship displays, often grouped together in leks. Such sexual selection results in the males of these species, including the Guianan cock-of-the-rock, being brightly coloured, or decorated with plumes or wattles, like the umbrellabirds, with their umbrella-like crest and long throat wattles. Other lekking cotingids like the bellbirds and screaming piha, have distinctive and far-carrying calls. In such canopy-dwelling genera as Carpodectes, Cotinga, and Xipholena, males gather high in a single tree or in adjacent trees, but male cocks-of-the-rock, as befits their more terrestrial lives, give their elaborate displays in leks on the ground.

The females of both lekking and biparental species are duller than the males.

== Breeding ==
Nests range from tiny to very large. Many species lay a single egg in a nest so flimsy that the egg can be seen from underneath. This may make the nests hard for predators to find. Fruiteaters build more solid cup nests, and the cocks-of-the-rock attach their mud nests to cliffs. The nests may be open cups or little platforms with loosely woven plant material, usually placed in a tree. The clutches comprise one to four eggs. Incubation typically takes 15–28 days. Fledging usually occurs at 28–33 days.

== Habitat ==
Deserts, open woodlands, coastal mangroves, and humid tropical forests comprise their habitats. Cotingas face very serious threats from the loss of their habitats.

== Taxonomy and systematics ==
The family Cotingidae was introduced by French naturalist Charles Lucien Bonaparte in 1849. According to the International Ornithological Committee, as of July 2021, the family contains 66 species divided into 24 genera.

A 2014 molecular phylogenetic study of the cotingas by Jacob Berv and Richard Prum found that the genera formed five monophyletic clades and they proposed that the family could be divided into five subfamilies. The following cladogram is based on a molecular phylogenetic study of the suboscines by Michael Harvey and collaborators published in 2020.

- Cotingidae
  - Pipreolinae
    - Ampelioides – scaled fruiteater
    - Pipreola – fruiteaters (11 species)
  - - Rupicolinae
      - - Snowornis – pihas (2 species)
        - Carpornis – berryeaters (2 species)
      - - Phoenicircus – cotingas (2 species)
        - Rupicola – cocks-of-the-rock (2 species)
    - - Phytotominae
        - Zaratornis – white-cheeked cotinga
        - - Phytotoma – plantcutters (3 species)
          - - Phibalura – cotingas (1 species)
            - - Doliornis – cotingas (2 species)
              - Ampelion – cotingas (2 species)
      - - Cephalopterinae
          - Haematoderus – crimson fruitcrow
          - - Querula – purple-throated fruitcrow
            - - Pyroderus – red-ruffed fruitcrow
              - - Perissocephalus – capuchinbird
                - Cephalopterus – umbrellabirds (3 species)
        - Cotinginae
          - Lipaugus – pihas and cotingas (9 species)
          - - Procnias – bellbirds (4 species)
            - - Cotinga – cotingas (7 species)
              - - Porphyrolaema – purple-throated cotinga
                - - - Conioptilon – black-faced cotinga
                    - Gymnoderus – bare-necked fruitcrow
                  - - Xipholena – cotingas (3 species)
                    - Carpodectes – cotingas (3 species)

The genus Tijuca was found to be embedded in Lipaugus, a position that was confirmed by a more detailed 2020 study.

Image	Genus	Living species
	Ampelioides Verreaux, 1867	Scaled fruiteater, Ampelioides tschudii
	Pipreola Swainson, 1838	Fiery-throated fruiteater, Pipreola chlorolepidota; Scarlet-breasted fruiteater, Pipreola frontalis; Handsome fruiteater, Pipreola formosa; Red-banded fruiteater, Pipreola whitelyi; Black-chested fruiteater, Pipreola lubomirskii; Orange-breasted fruiteater, Pipreola jucunda; Masked fruiteater, Pipreola pulchra; Golden-breasted fruiteater, Pipreola aureopectus; Barred fruiteater, Pipreola arcuata; Band-tailed fruiteater, Pipreola intermedia; Green-and-black fruiteater, Pipreola riefferii
	Snowornis Prum, 2001	Grey-tailed piha, Snowornis subalaris; Olivaceous piha, Snowornis cryptolophus
	Carpornis G.R. Gray, 1846	Hooded berryeater, Carpornis cucullata; Black-headed berryeater, Carpornis melanocephala
	Rupicola Brisson, 1760	Andean cock-of-the-rock, Rupicola peruvianus; Guianan cock-of-the-rock, Rupicola rupicola
	Phoenicircus Swainson, 1832	Guianan red cotinga, Phoenicircus carnifex; Black-necked red cotinga, Phoenicircus nigricollis
	Zaratornis Koepcke, 1954	White-cheeked cotinga, Zaratornis stresemanni
	Phytotoma Molina, 1782	Rufous-tailed plantcutter or Chilean plantcutter, Phytotoma rara; Peruvian plantcutter, Phytotoma raimondii; White-tipped plantcutter or reddish plantcutter, Phytotoma rutila
	Phibalura Vieillot, 1816	Swallow-tailed cotinga, Phibalura flavirostris
	Doliornis Taczanowski, 1874	Bay-vented cotinga, Doliornis sclateri; Chestnut-bellied cotinga, Doliornis remseni
	Ampelion Tschudi, 1845	Red-crested cotinga, Ampelion rubrocristatus; Chestnut-crested cotinga, Ampelion rufaxilla
	Haematoderus Bonaparte, 1854	Crimson fruitcrow, Haematoderus militaris
	Querula Vieillot, 1816	Purple-throated fruitcrow, Querula purpurata
	Pyroderus G.R. Gray, 1840	Red-ruffed fruitcrow, Pyroderus scutatus
	Cephalopterus E. Geoffroy Saint-Hilaire, 1809	Bare-necked umbrellabird, Cephalopterus glabricollis; Long-wattled umbrellabird, Cephalopterus penduliger; Amazonian umbrellabird, Cephalopterus ornatus
	Perissocephalus Oberholser, 1899	Capuchinbird, Perissocephalus tricolor
	Lipaugus F. Boie, 1828	Rufous piha, Lipaugus unirufus; Cinnamon-vented piha, Lipaugus lanioides; Rose-collared piha, Lipaugus streptophorus; Screaming piha, Lipaugus vociferans; Dusky piha, Lipaugus fuscocinereus; Scimitar-winged piha, Lipaugus uropygialis; Chestnut-capped piha, Lipaugus weberi; Black-and-gold cotinga, Lipaugus ater; Grey-winged cotinga, Lipaugus conditus
	Procnias Illiger, 1811	White bellbird, Procnias albus; Three-wattled bellbird, Procnias tricarunculatus; Bare-throated bellbird, Procnias nudicollis; Bearded bellbird, Procnias averano
	Cotinga Brisson, 1760	Plum-throated cotinga, Cotinga maynana; Spangled cotinga, Cotinga cayana; Lovely cotinga, Cotinga amabilis; Blue cotinga, Cotinga nattererii; Turquoise cotinga, Cotinga ridgwayi; Banded cotinga, Cotinga maculata; Purple-breasted cotinga, Cotinga cotinga
	Porphyrolaema Bonaparte, 1854	Purple-throated cotinga, Porphyrolaema porphyrolaema
	Conioptilon Lowery & O'Neill, 1966	Black-faced cotinga, Conioptilon mcilhennyi
	Gymnoderus E. Geoffroy Saint-Hilaire, 1809	Bare-necked fruitcrow, Gymnoderus foetidus
	Xipholena Gloger, 1841	Pompadour cotinga, Xipholena punicea; White-tailed cotinga, Xipholena lamellipennis; White-winged cotinga, Xipholena atropurpurea
	Carpodectes Salvin, 1865	Black-tipped cotinga, Carpodectes hopkei; Yellow-billed cotinga, Carpodectes antoniae; Snowy cotinga, Carpodectes nitidus

A number of species previously placed in this family are now placed in the family Tityridae (genera Laniisoma, Laniocera and Iodopleura)
