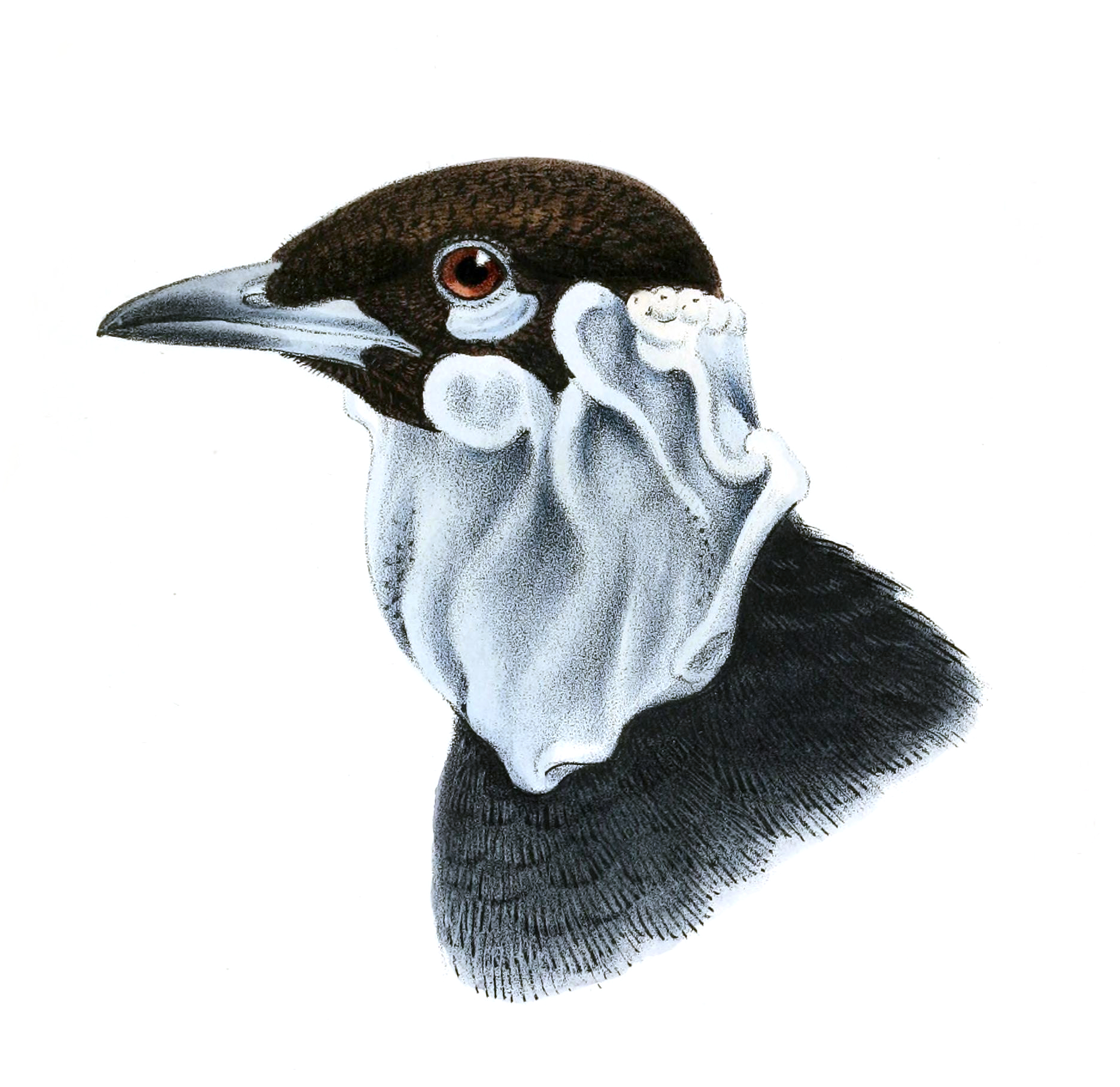
- Drawing by John Keulemans 1901
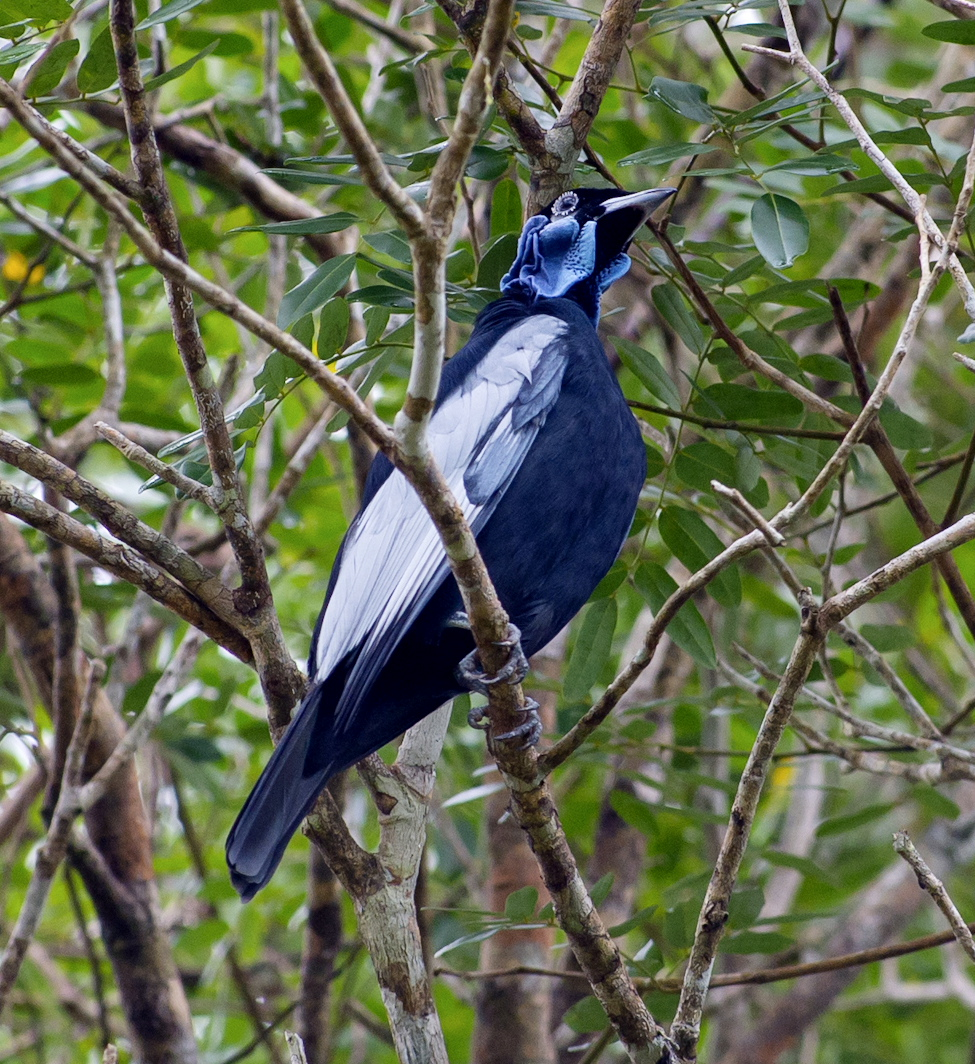

Conservation status
- Least Concern (IUCN 3.1)

Scientific classification
- Kingdom: Animalia
- Phylum: Chordata
- Class: Aves
- Order: Passeriformes
- Family: Cotingidae
- Genus: Gymnoderus; E. Geoffroy Saint-Hilaire, 1809
- Species: G. foetidus

Binomial name
- Gymnoderus foetidus (Linnaeus, 1758)

Synonyms
- Gracula foetida Linnaeus, 1758 (protonym)

= Bare-necked fruitcrow =

Species of bird

The bare-necked fruitcrow (Gymnoderus foetidus) is a species of bird in the family Cotingidae, the cotingas. It is found in every mainland South American country except Argentina, Chile, Uruguay, and Paraguay.

== Taxonomy and systematics ==
The bare-necked fruitcrow was formally described in 1758 by the Swedish naturalist Carl Linnaeus in the tenth edition of his Systema Naturae under the binomial name Gracula foetida. Linnaeus specified the type locality as America but in 1902 the locality was restricted to Surinam. The bare-necked fruitcrow is now the only species placed in the genus Gymnoderus that was introduced in 1809 by the French naturalist Étienne Geoffroy Saint-Hilaire. The genus name combines the Ancient Greek gumnos meaning "bare" or "naked" with dera meaning "neck" or "throat". The specific epithet foetidus is Latin meaning "stinking". The species is monotypic: no subspecies are recognized.

A large molecular phylogenetic study of the suboscines published in 2020 found that the bare-necked fruitcrow was sister to the black-faced cotinga (Conioptilon mcilhennyi).

== Description ==
The bare-necked fruitcrow is 34 to 39 cm (13 to 15 in) long; one individual weighed 220 g (7.8 oz). Both sexes have bare blue or bluish white skin on their lower face and neck; on both the skin drapes in folds though much less so on the female than male. The rest of their heads have short velvety feathers and their flanks have large patches of powder down. Adult males are otherwise mostly black except that most of their wing is silvery gray. Females are smaller than males; adults are mostly slaty gray with a faint paler scaly pattern. Juveniles are mostly white; immatures progress from there to adult plumage over two to three years.

== Distribution and habitat ==
The bare-necked fruitcrow is primarily a bird of the Amazon Basin, although its range skirts much of the Negro River watershed in the northern part of it and also includes the basin of the Orinoco River. One arm of its range extends from far eastern Colombia and southwestern Venezuela across far northern Brazil and the Guianas to the Atlantic and south from there to join the rest of the range. The bulk of its range extends from south-central Colombia, eastern Ecuador, and eastern Peru east through northern Bolivia and north-central Brazil. In Brazil the main range's northern edge is roughly from west-central Amazonas east to Amapá and its southern edge from northern Mato Grosso do Sul northeast to the Atlantic in Maranhão.

The bare-necked fruitcrow inhabits humid forest including várzea and terra firme types. It tends to be most frequent along rivers and around lakes. In elevation it is found below 500 m (1,600 ft) in Colombia, below 300 m (1,000 ft) in Ecuador, below 600 m (2,000 ft) in Peru, and below 150 m (500 ft) in Venezuela.

== Behavior ==
=== Movement ===
The bare-necked fruitcrow is often seen in small flocks along and crossing rivers, but it is not known if this movement is local or represents seasonal migration.

=== Feeding ===
The bare-necked fruitcrow feeds mostly on fruit and also includes small and large insects in its diet. It forages singly, in pairs, and in flocks. Atypically among cotingas, it takes much fruit and insects while running or hopping along branches. It takes some insects, for instance flying ants, in mid-air with sallies from atop a tree.

=== Breeding ===
The bare-necked fruitcrow's breeding season varies latitudinally, becoming later south to north. The one described nest was a shallow cup made from lichens and thin plant fibers coated with fungus. It was on a horizontal branch at an estimated height of 6 to 10 m (20 to 35 ft) above the ground. Another, not otherwise described, was 40 m (130 ft) up in the crown of a tree. The clutch is believed to be one egg. Nothing else is known about the species' breeding biology.

=== Vocalization ===
The bare-necked fruitcrow is described by some as silent or "apparently mute". Nevertheless, its voice has been described as a "deep bellowing oooooooo like a fog-horn". As of October 2025 xeno-canto and Cornell Lab's Macaulay Library each had a single recording.

== Status ==
The IUCN has assessed the bare-necked fruitcrow as being of Least Concern. It has a very large range; its population size is not known and is believed to be decreasing. No immediate threats have been identified. It is considered common in Colombia, Ecuador, and Brazil, fairly common in Peru, and uncommon in Venezuela. It occurs in several protected areas.
