= Córdoba (wetland) =

Wetland in Bogotá, Colombia

Córdoba Wetland Humedal de Córdoba
- Muysccubun: Itzatá
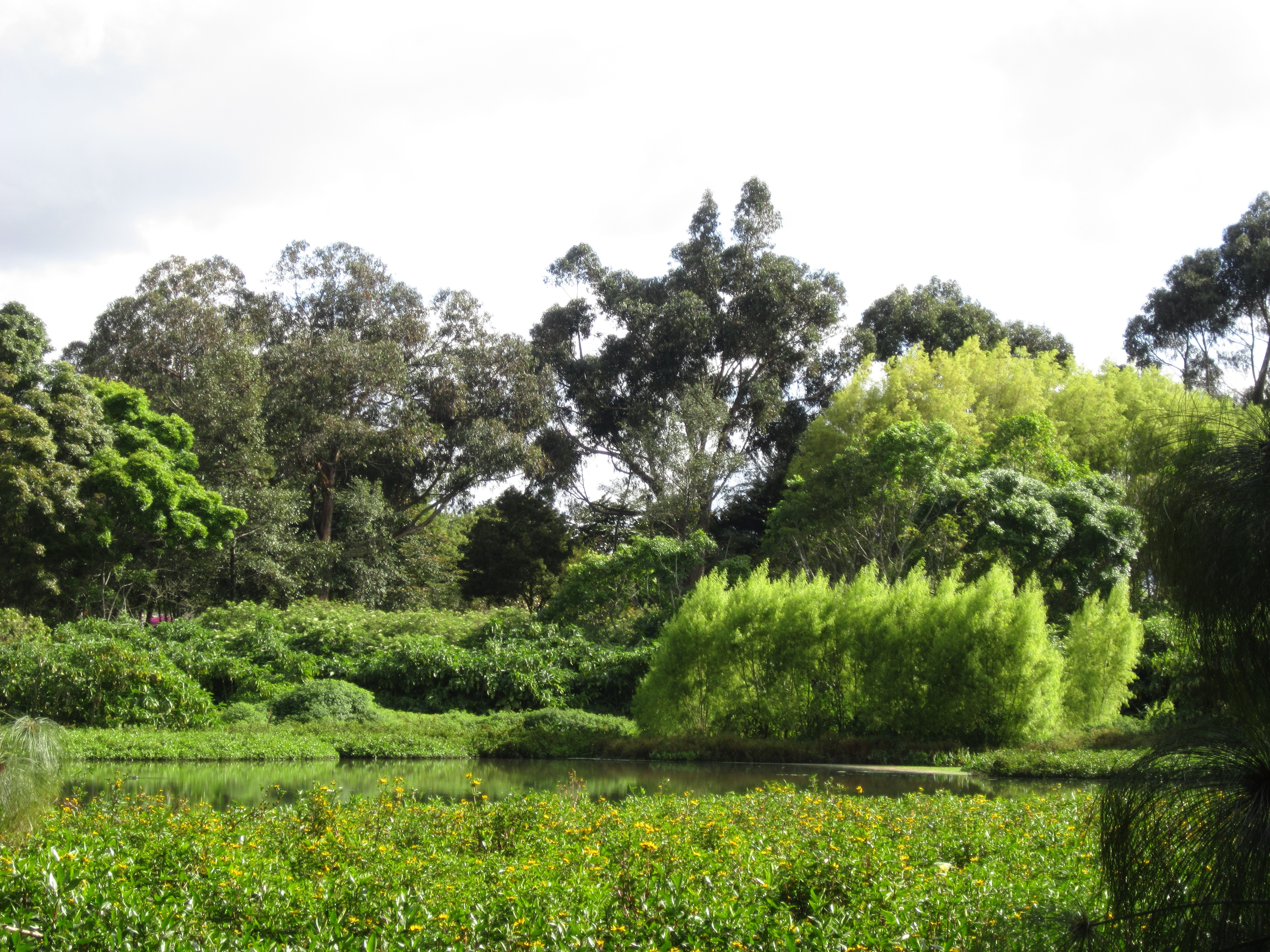
- Córdoba Wetland

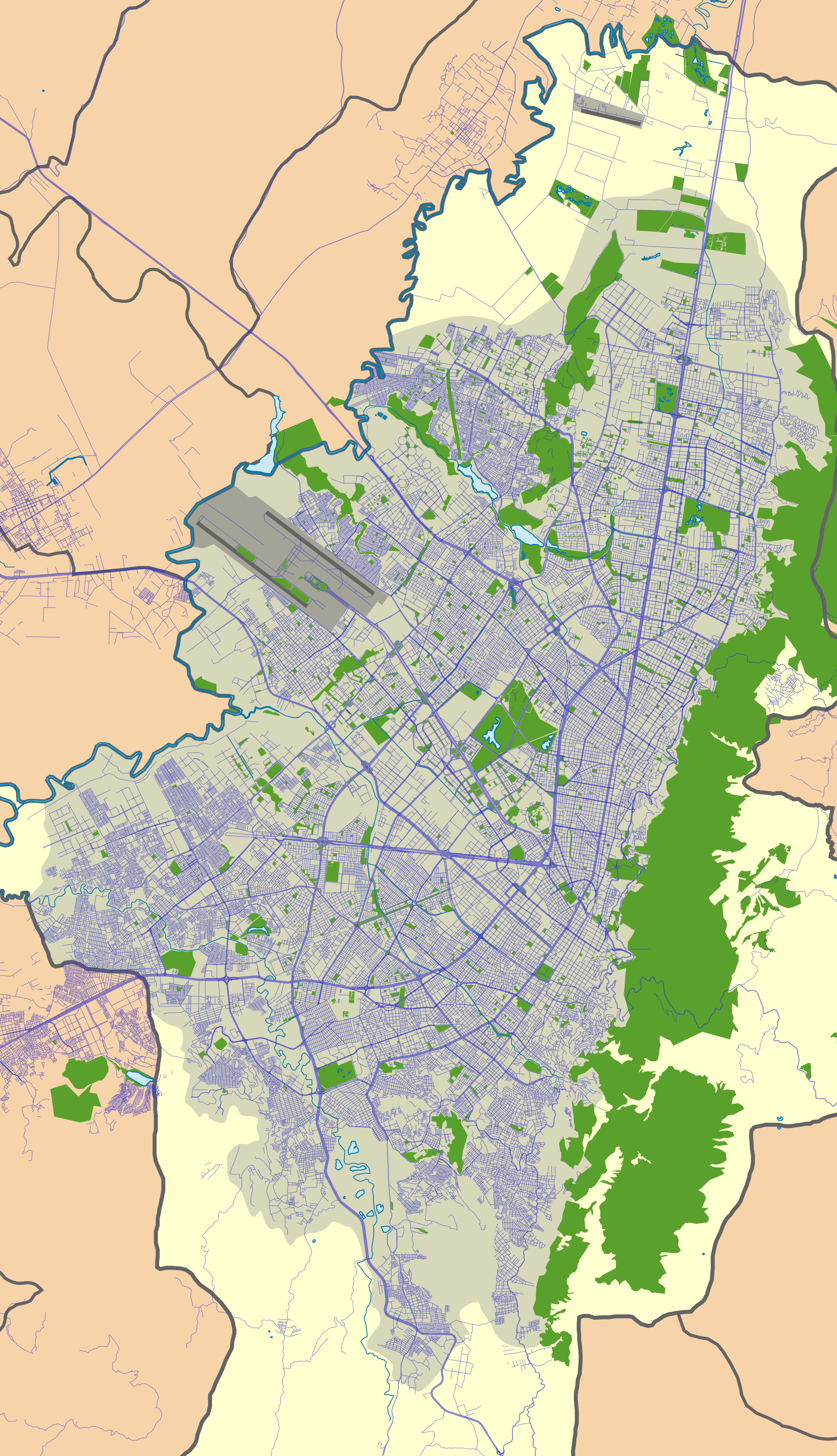
- Location within Bogotá
- Location: Suba, Bogotá; Colombia
- Coordinates: 4°42′13.4″N 74°3′59.7″W
- Area: 40.51 ha (100.1 acres)
- Elevation: 2,548 m (8,360 ft)
- Designated: September 2003
- Named for: Córdoba River
- Administrator: EAAB - ESP

Córdoba (Spanish: Humedal de Córdoba) is a wetland, part of the Wetlands of Bogotá in Bogotá, Colombia. It is situated on the Bogotá savanna in the locality Suba between the Avenida Boyacá and Avenida Córdoba and the streets Calle 127 and Calle 116, close to the TransMilenio stations Av. Suba Calle 116 and namesake station Humedal Córdoba. The wetland covers about 40 hectares (99 acres).

== Flora and fauna ==
=== Flora ===
Flora registered in the wetland are among others Alnus acuminata, Ficus soatensis, Senna multiglandulosa, Spirodela intermedia, Bidens laevis, Eichornia crassipes.

=== Birds ===
Of the wetlands of Bogotá, Córdoba has the highest number of registered bird species with 96 of which 17 endemic.

Endemic species unique for this wetland are:

Name	Species	Image
red-crested cotinga	Ampelion rubrocristatus	
scarlet-bellied mountain tanager	Anisognathus igniventris	
stygian owl	Asio stygius	
black-crested warbler	Basileuterus nigrocristatus	
yellow-rumped cacique	Cacicus cela	
olive-sided flycatcher	Contopus cooperi	
cerulean warbler	Dendroica cerulea	
blackpoll warbler	Dendroica striata	
masked flowerpiercer	Diglossa cyanea	
buff-breasted mountain tanager	Dubusia taeniata	
snowy egret	Egretta thula	
streaked flycatcher	Myiodynastes maculatus	
tropical screech owl	Otus choliba	
black-backed grosbeak	Pheucticus aureoventris	
stripe-tailed yellow finch	Sicalis citrina	
palm tanager	Thraupis palmarum	
black-billed thrush	Turdus ignobilis	

== Gallery ==
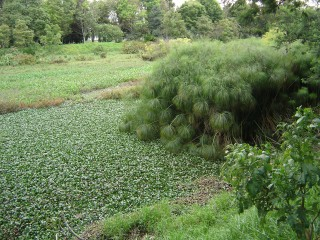

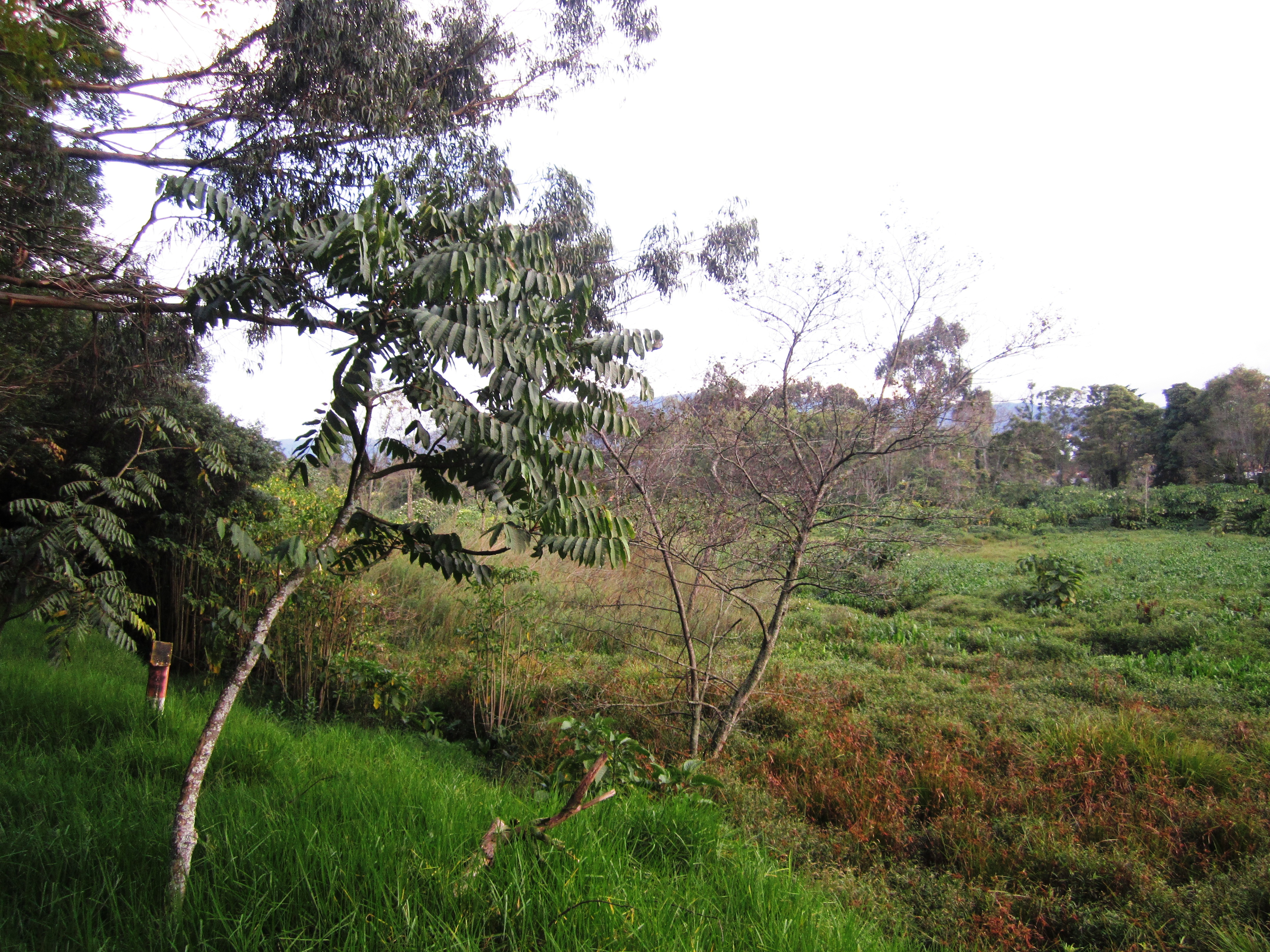

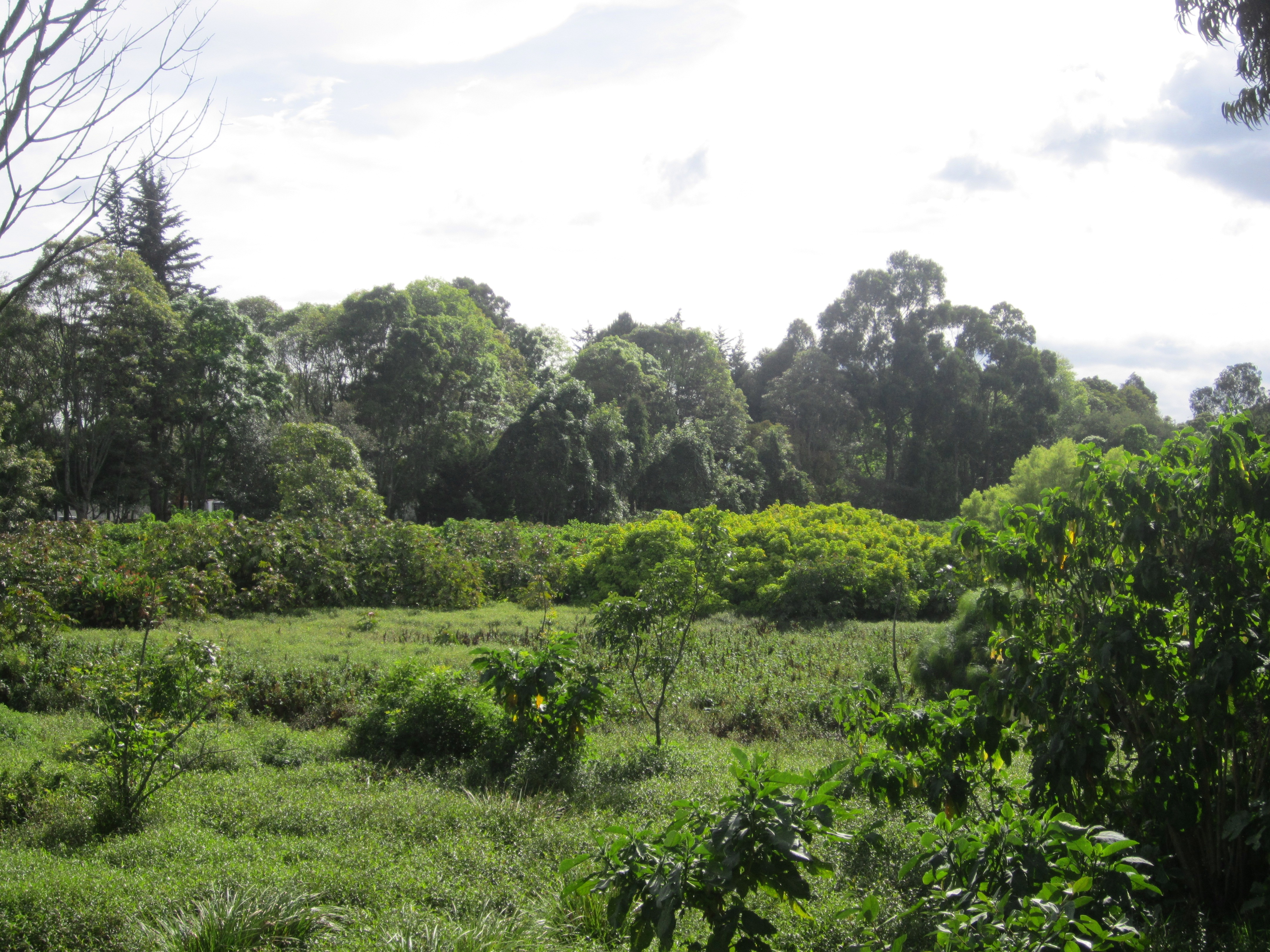

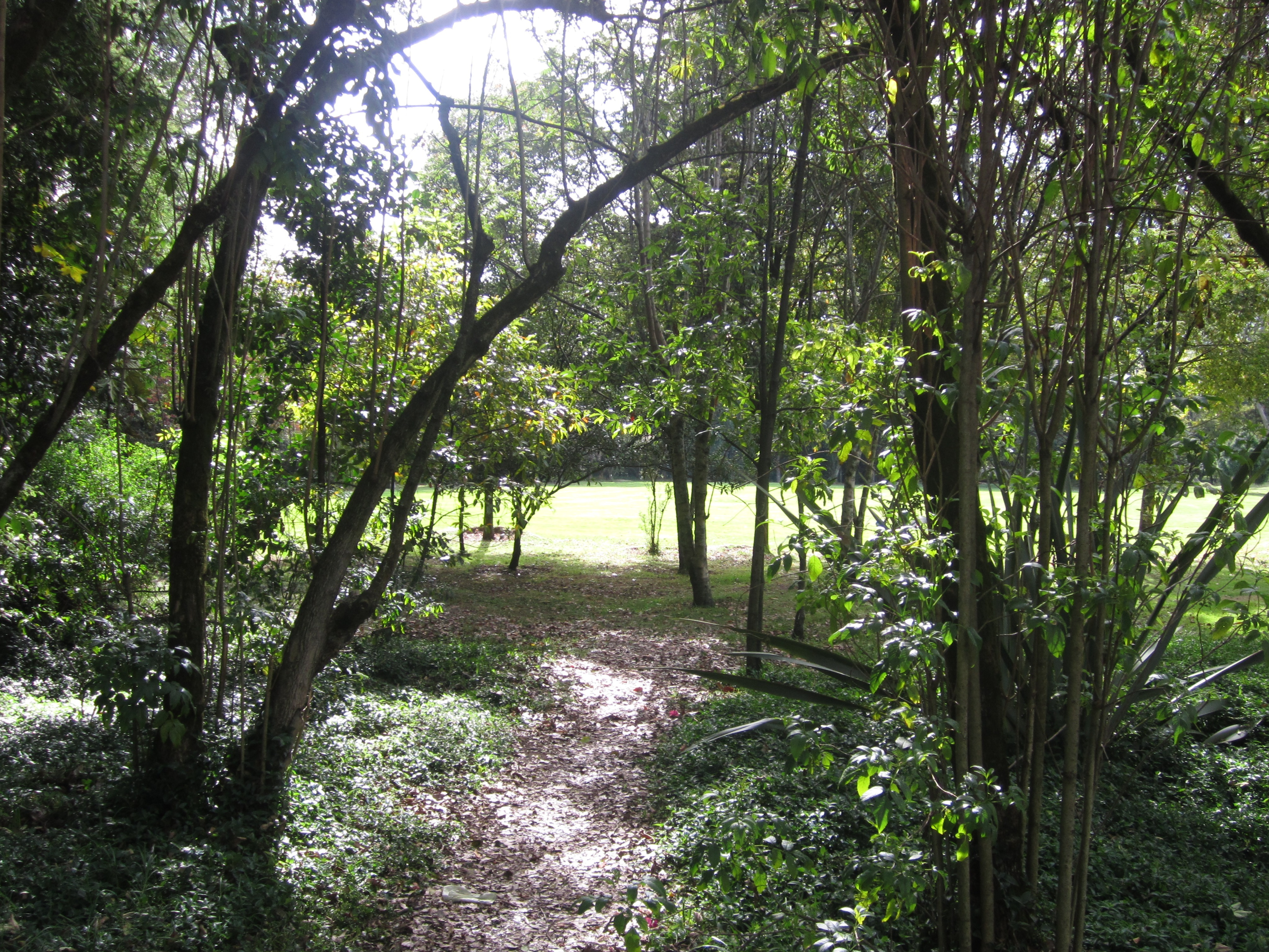

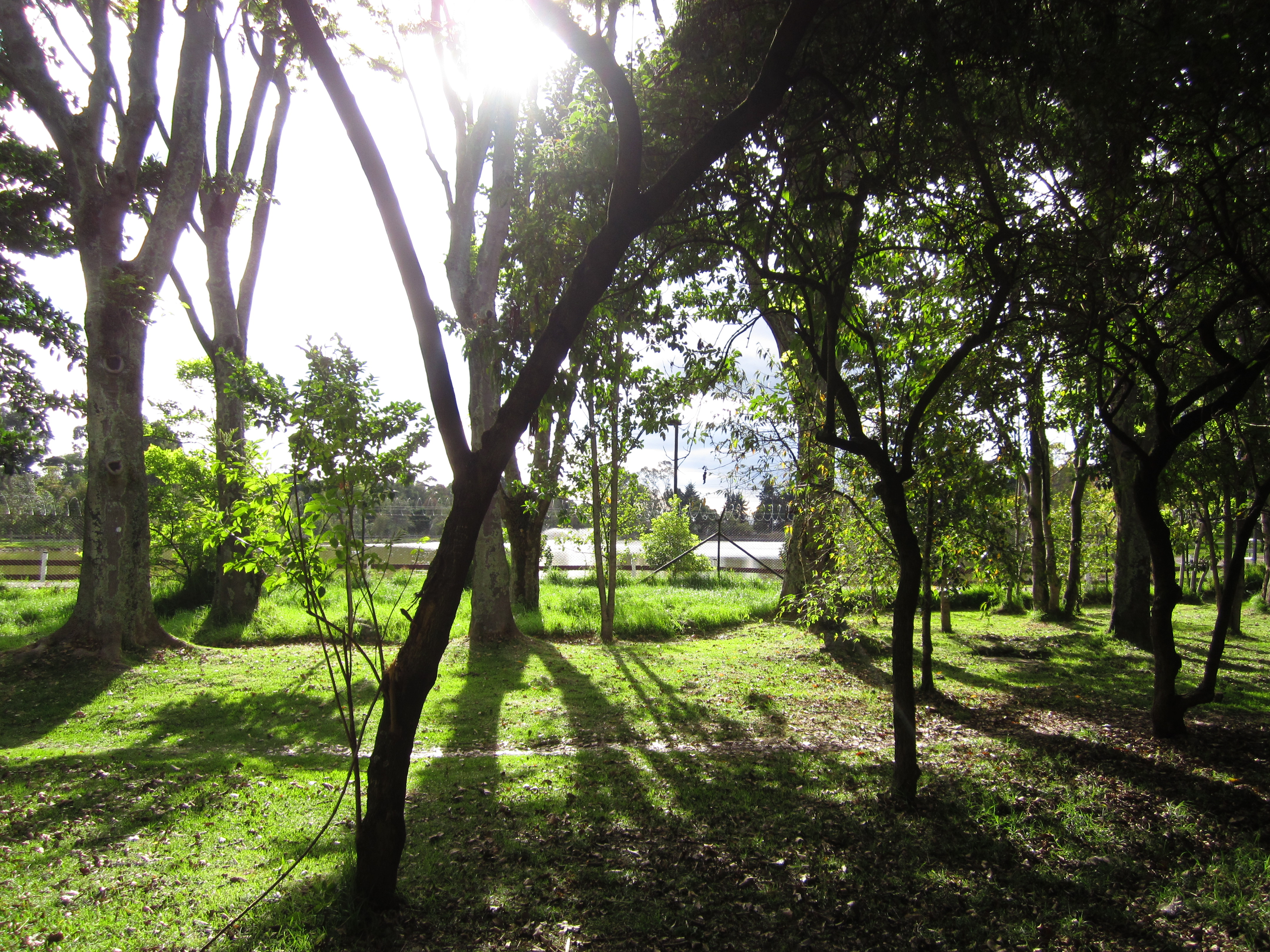

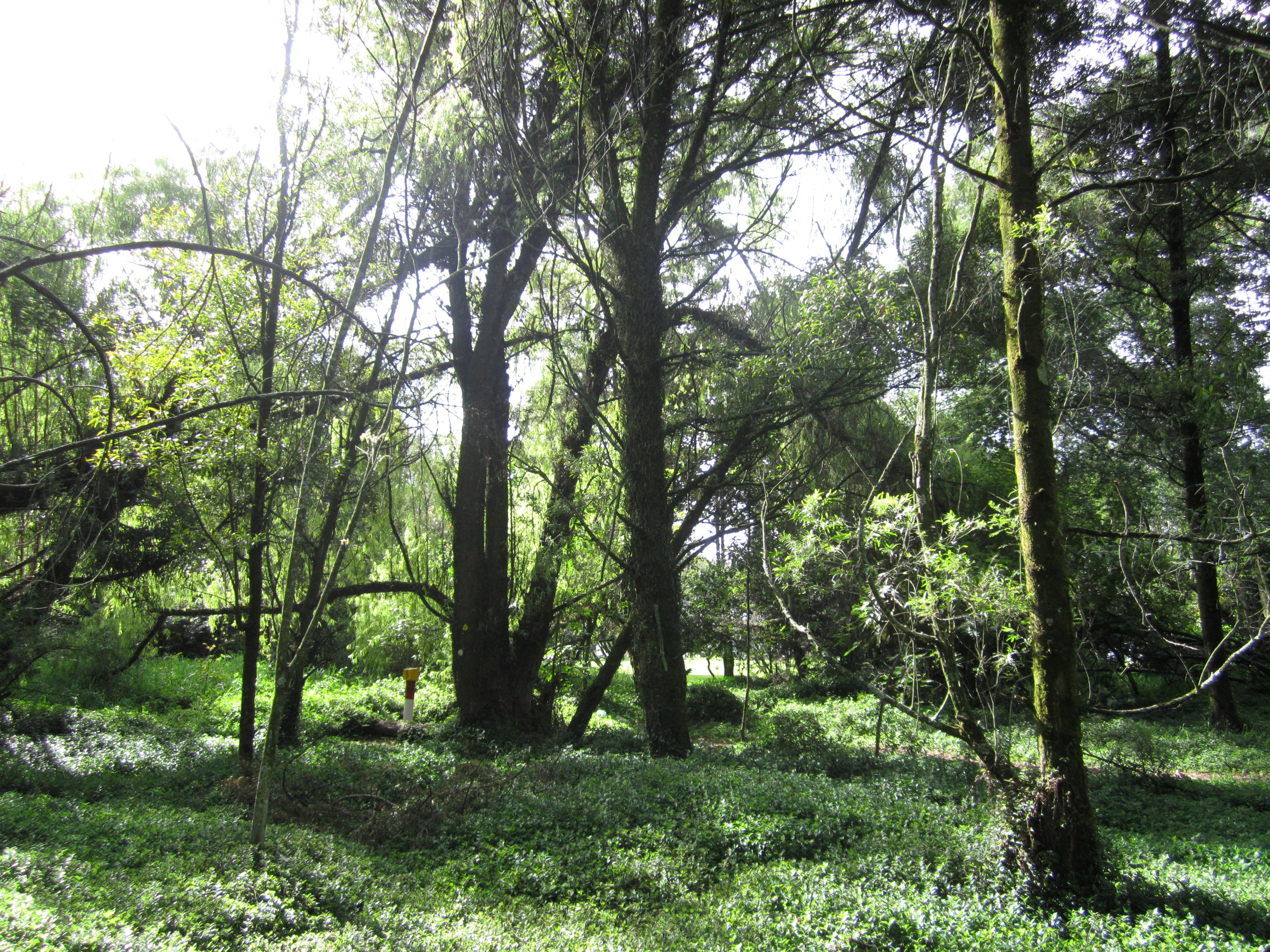

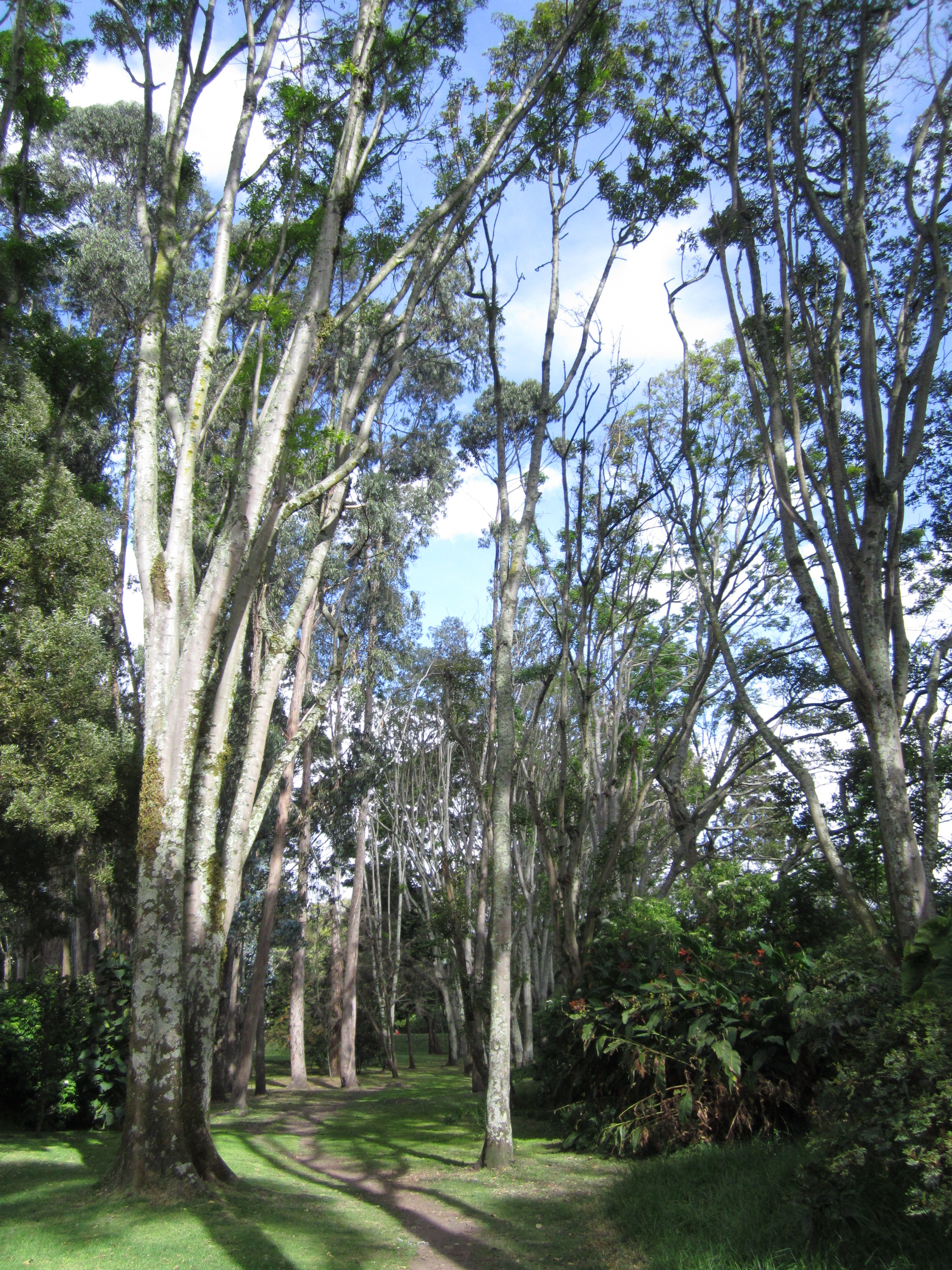

== See also ==
- Biodiversity of Colombia, Bogotá savanna, Thomas van der Hammen Natural Reserve
- Wetlands of Bogotá
