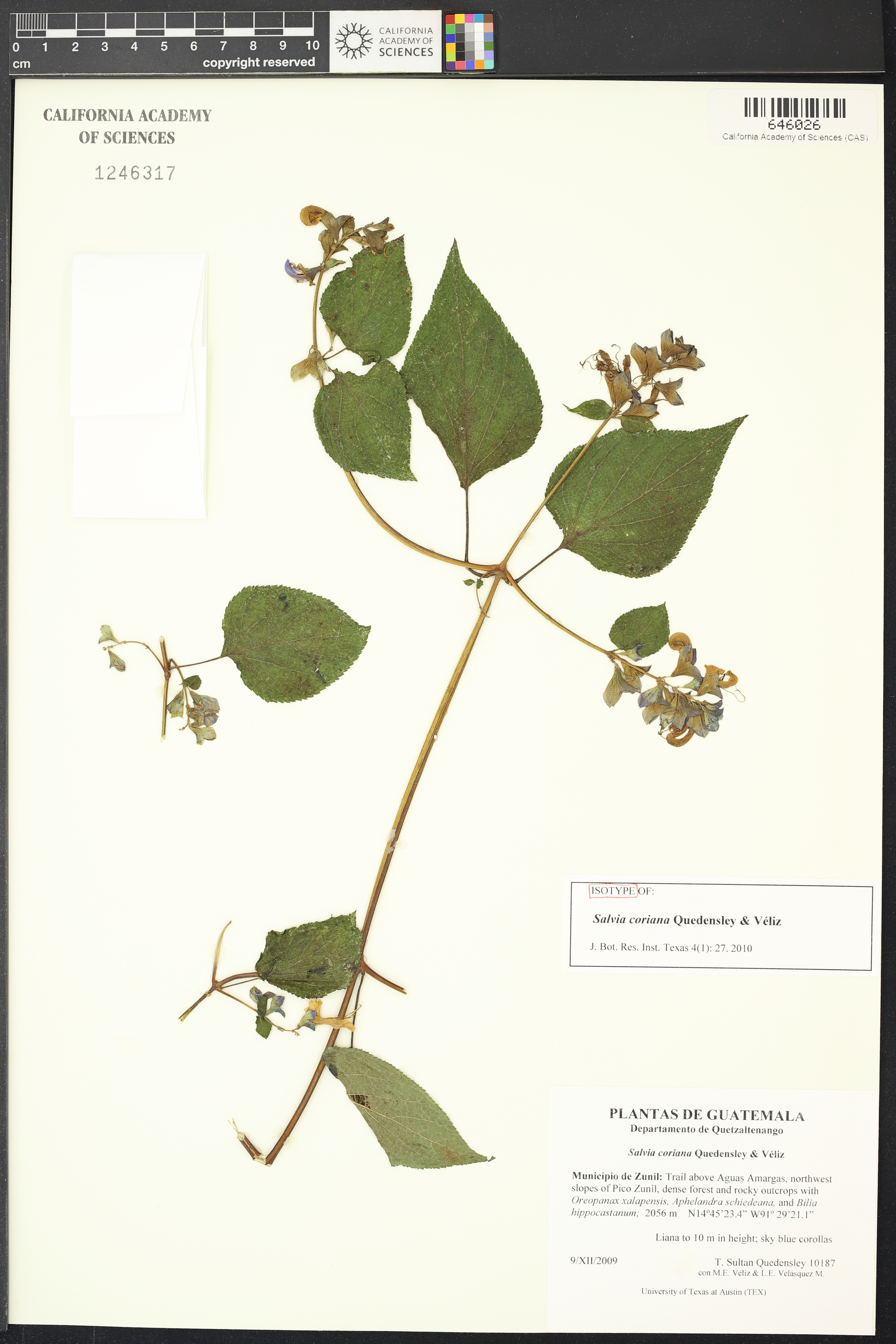

Scientific classification
- Kingdom: Plantae
- Clade: Tracheophytes
- Clade: Angiosperms
- Clade: Eudicots
- Clade: Asterids
- Order: Lamiales
- Family: Lamiaceae
- Genus: Salvia
- Species: S. coriana

Binomial name
- Salvia coriana Quedensley & Véliz

= Salvia coriana =

Species of flowering plant

Salvia coriana is a perennial plant that is endemic to tropical cloud forest in Guatemala, growing at approximately 2,000 m (6,600 ft) elevation on the northwestern slopes of Pico Zunil in the Sierra Chuatroj range.

S. coriana is a liana which grows up to 12 m (39 ft) into the tree canopy, with erect arching branches. Leaves are opposite, with 3 to 5 cm (1.2 to 2.0 in) petioles and leaf blades that are 7 to 12 cm (2.8 to 4.7 in) long and 5 to 9 cm (2.0 to 3.5 in) wide. Inflorescences are lax 3–6 flowered verticillasters. The calyces are dark purple as they age. The corollas are sky blue, with the upper lip 12 to 16 mm (0.47 to 0.63 in) long, and the lower lip 9 to 11 mm (0.35 to 0.43 in), flowering in late December to early January.

It is apparently related to Salvia recurva, but grows as a liana, with smaller leaves, and shorter upper and lower corollas which are blue. The specific epithet honors Jean Coria (1926–2008), a longtime Salvia grower who was associated with the San Francisco Botanical Garden.
