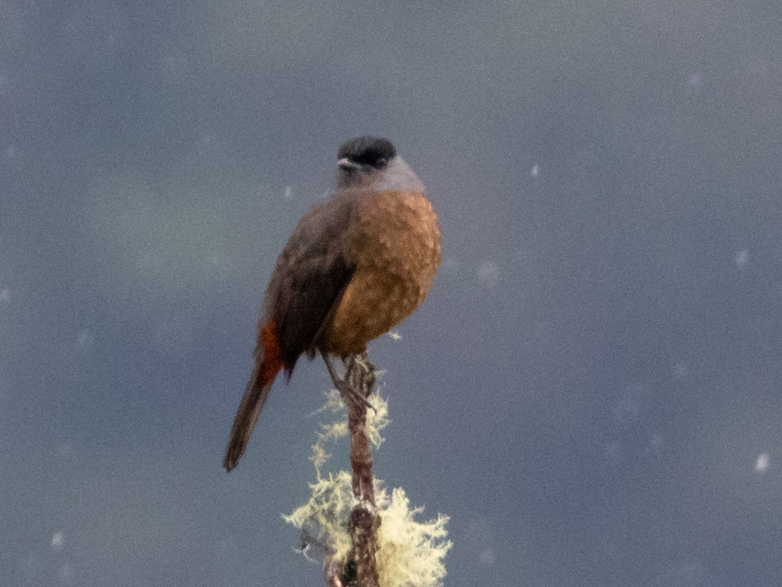
- A bay-vented cotinga in Oxapampa on March 13, 2020.

Conservation status
- Near Threatened (IUCN 3.1)

Scientific classification
- Kingdom: Animalia
- Phylum: Chordata
- Class: Aves
- Order: Passeriformes
- Family: Cotingidae
- Genus: Doliornis
- Species: D. sclateri

Binomial name
- Doliornis sclateri Taczanowski, 1874

= Bay-vented cotinga =

Species of bird

The bay-vented cotinga (Doliornis sclateri) is a species of bird in the family Cotingidae. It is endemic to Peru.

== Taxonomy and systematics ==
A few late twentieth century authors merged genus Doliornis into Ampelion but multiple studies since then have confirmed its separation. The bay-vented cotinga is monotypic. It shares genus Doliornis with the chestnut-bellied cotinga (D. remseni) and the two form a superspecies.

== Description ==
The bay-vented cotinga is 20 to 21.5 cm (7.9 to 8.5 in) long and weighs 53 to 69 g (1.9 to 2.4 oz). The sexes have similar plumage. Adult males have a glossy black crown with a partially hidden reddish chestnut crest in the middle. Their upper back is dark grayish that becomes browner on the rump and tail. Their wings are grayish brown. Their face and throat are a paler gray than their upperparts. Their breast and belly are brown; in unworn plumage their breast has buff bars. Their undertail coverts are rufous chestnut. Adult females have a dark gray crown with dusky streaks and a duller red crest. Their back and uppertail coverts are paler than the male's. Both sexes have a gray iris, a black maxilla, a blue-gray mandible with a black tip, and dark gray legs and feet. Juveniles have a gray crown without a crest, and their breast and belly are clay-colored.

== Distribution and habitat ==
The bay-vented cotinga is found on the eastern side of the Peruvian Andes from southern Amazonas and northwestern San Martín departments south to central Junín Department. It is known only from a few locations within that range. It inhabits humid elfin forest at or near tree line. In elevation it ranges between 2,600 and 3,800 m (8,500 and 12,500 ft).

== Behavior ==
=== Movement ===
The bay-vented cotinga is a year-round resident.

=== Feeding ===
The bay-vented cotinga feeds mostly on fruits and also includes some insects in its diet, though details are sparse. It usually forages singly or in pairs, mostly in the forest's subcanopy and canopy.

=== Breeding ===
The bay-vented cotinga's breeding season includes April to July. Nothing else is known about the species' breeding biology.

=== Vocalization ===
The bay-vented cotinga's most common vocalization, which may be either a call or song, is "a mewing, rising rhee or rhee-ah" that is rather loud and scratchy.

== Status ==
The IUCN originally in 1988 assessed the bay-vented cotinga as being of Least Concern; it was relisted as Vulnerable in 2004 and since 2022 as Near Threatened. It has a restricted range and its estimated population of 2380 mature individuals is believed to be decreasing. "The páramo/cloud-forest ecotone habitat favoured by this species is being reduced and degraded owing to the use of fire to maintain pastureland and overgrazing by livestock." It is considered rare and local.
