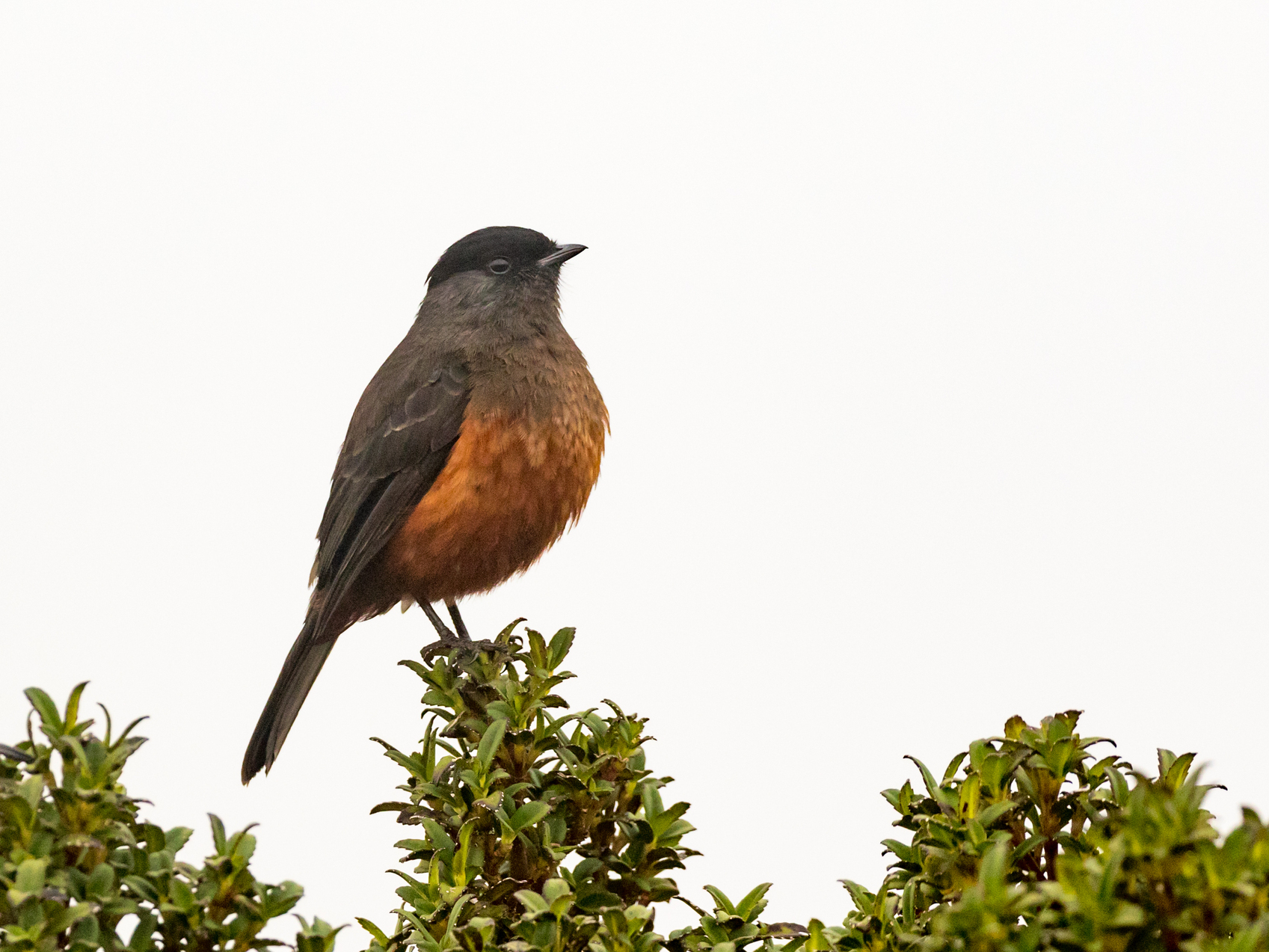

Conservation status
- Near Threatened (IUCN 3.1)

Scientific classification
- Kingdom: Animalia
- Phylum: Chordata
- Class: Aves
- Order: Passeriformes
- Family: Cotingidae
- Genus: Doliornis
- Species: D. remseni

Binomial name
- Doliornis remseni Robbins, Rosenberg, GH & Sornoza-Molina, 1994

= Chestnut-bellied cotinga =

Species of bird

The chestnut-bellied cotinga (Doliornis remseni) is a species of bird in the family Cotingidae. It is found in Colombia and Ecuador.

== Taxonomy and systematics ==
A few late twentieth century authors merged genus Doliornis into Ampelion but multiple studies since then have confirmed its separation. The chestnut-bellied cotinga is monotypic. It shares genus Doliornis with the bay-vented cotinga (D. sclateri) and the two form a superspecies.

== Description ==
The chestnut-bellied cotinga is about 21 to 21.5 cm (8.3 to 8.5 in) long and weighs 58 to 72 g (2.0 to 2.5 oz). The sexes have almost the same plumage. Adult males have a black crown and nape with a usually hidden dark orange-red crest in the middle of the crown; the rest of their head is dark gray. Their upperparts, wings, and tail are blackish. Their breast is dark grayish and the rest of their underparts are rich rufous-chestnut. Adult females have an entirely dark gray head with lighter gray fringes on the feathers but are otherwise like males. Both sexes have a dark red-brown iris, a slate gray to black bill, and dark gray to black legs and feet.

== Distribution and habitat ==
The chestnut-bellied cotinga is found intermittently from Putumayo Department in west-central Colombia south along the east side of the Andes of Ecuador to near the border with Peru. Its range has not been fully determined and may extend beyond the currently known limits, especially in Colombia. There are no records in Peru "but is to be expected". It inhabits stunted woodlands at and near tree line. In elevation it ranges between 3,400 and 3,700 m (11,200 and 12,100 ft) in Colombia and between 2,900 and 3,500 m (9,500 and 11,500 ft) in Ecuador.

== Behavior ==
=== Movement ===
The chestnut-bellied cotinga is believed to be a year-round resident.

=== Feeding ===
The chestnut-bellied cotinga is only known to feed on fruits. It has been observed feeding on those of Escallonia and Miconia chlorocarpa shrubs and trees.

=== Breeding ===
Nothing is known about the chestnut-bellied cotinga's breeding biology.

=== Vocalization ===
Most of the recordings of chestnut-bellied cotinga vocalizations can be described as "a raspy single overslurred note rrreh, repeated at intervals".

== Status ==
The IUCN originally in 1994 assessed the chestnut-bellied cotinga as Vulnerable and since 2022 as Near Threatened. It is found intermittently along a narrow elevational band. Its estimated population of between 2500 and 10,000 mature individuals is believed to be decreasing. "Tmberline habitats in the Andes have been diminishing for millennia, primarily through human use of fire...The main drivers of recent habitat loss are conversion for cattle pastures...Large areas of suitable habitat have been, and continue to be, destroyed in this way." The species is considered "very rare and local" in Colombia and "rare and local" in Ecuador. It occurs in one protected area in Colombia and two in Ecuador "but other sites have no protection at all".
