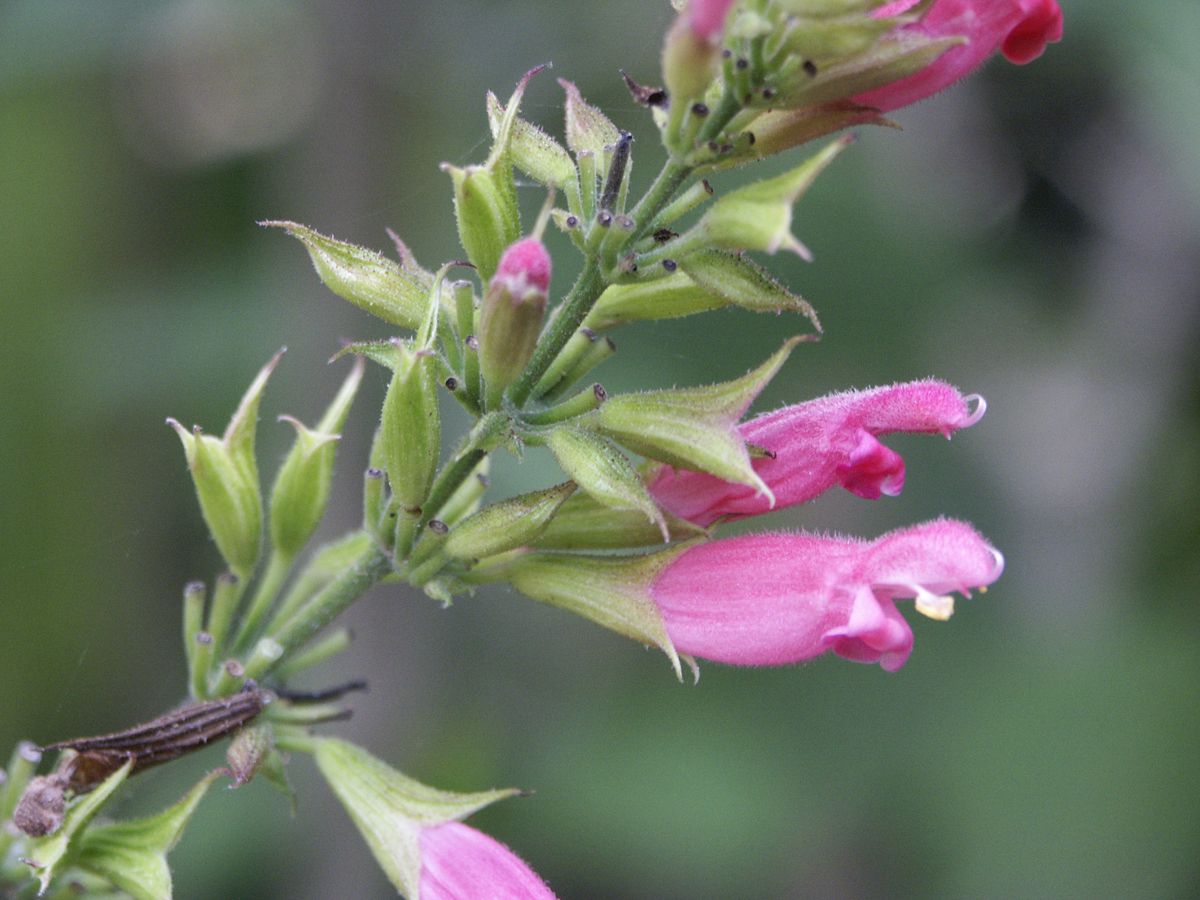

Scientific classification
- Kingdom: Plantae
- Clade: Tracheophytes
- Clade: Angiosperms
- Clade: Eudicots
- Clade: Asterids
- Order: Lamiales
- Family: Lamiaceae
- Genus: Salvia
- Species: S. karwinskii

Binomial name
- Salvia karwinskii Benth.

= Salvia karwinskii =

Species of plant

Salvia karwinskii (Karwinski's sage) is a perennial shrub native to the moist mountain forests of Mexico, Guatemala, Honduras, El Salvador, and Nicaragua, typically growing in or near pine or oak forests at 4,000 to 8,000 feet (1,200 to 2,400 m) elevation. It is known as a honey-producing plant in those areas, but is rarely seen in private gardens. Specimens are grown at Strybing Arboretum, Huntington Botanical Gardens, and University of California Botanical Garden.

In California gardens, it reaches 8 feet tall and 4 ft wide (2.4 by 1.2 m), and in the wild it reaches up to 12 ft tall (3.7 m). The 1 in flowers are inflated and have two lips, ranging in color from brick-red, rose-red, to scarlet, and are carried on many 15 in racemes. The calyx is a showy dark-red, about 0.5-inch long (1.3 cm). The stems and petioles of the leaves have short wooly hairs, making them appear gray. The 6-inch (15 cm) rough leaves are evergreen, with veining on the underside and light cream-colored hairs.
