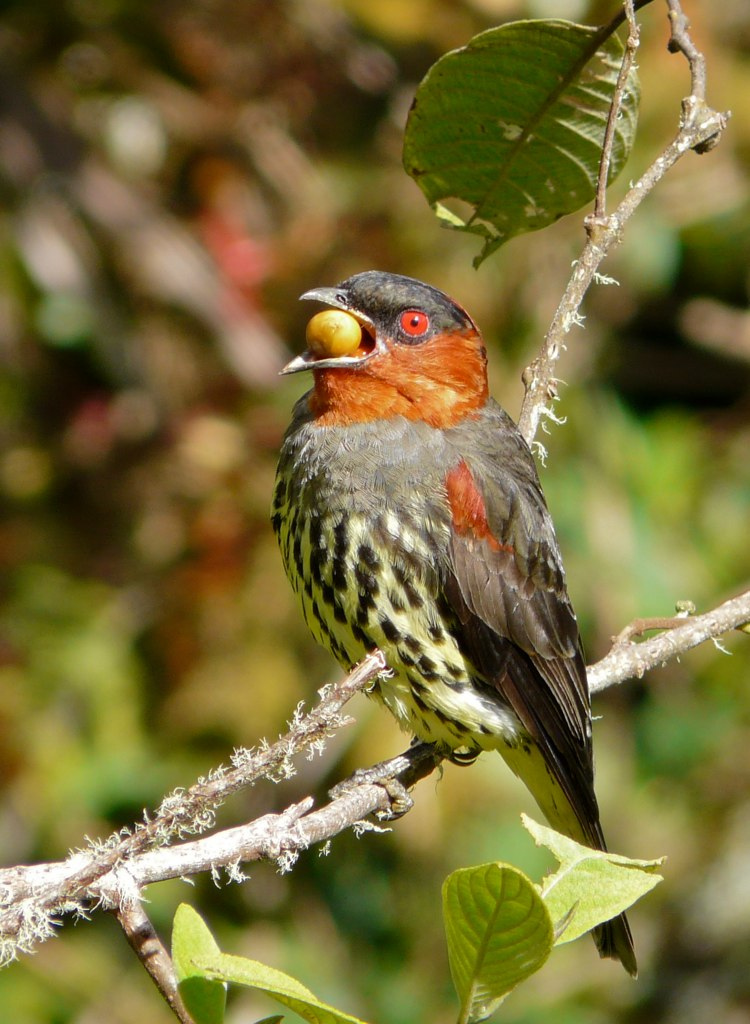

Conservation status
- Least Concern (IUCN 3.1)

Scientific classification
- Kingdom: Animalia
- Phylum: Chordata
- Class: Aves
- Order: Passeriformes
- Family: Cotingidae
- Genus: Ampelion
- Species: A. rufaxilla

Binomial name
- Ampelion rufaxilla (Tschudi, 1844)

= Chestnut-crested cotinga =

Species of bird

The chestnut-crested cotinga (Ampelion rufaxilla) is a species of bird in the family Cotingidae. It is found in Bolivia, Colombia, Ecuador, and Peru.

== Taxonomy and systematics ==
The chestnut-crested cotinga shares genus Ampelion with the red-crested cotinga (A. rubrocristatus). Early in the twentieth century some authors had placed both of them in genus Heliochera, which no longer exists.

The chestnut-crested cotinga has two subspecies, the nominate A. r. rufaxilla (Tschudi, 1844) and A. r. antioquiae (Chapman, 1924).

== Description ==
The chestnut-crested cotinga is 18.5 to 23 cm (7.3 to 9.1 in) long and weighs 69 to 77 g (2.4 to 2.7 oz). The sexes have the same plumage. Adults of the nominate subspecies have a black crown with a long chestnut crest in the center. Their upperparts are olive gray with dusky streaks on the back. Their wings and tail are mostly black or blackish brown with chestnut lesser and median wing coverts. Their face, nape, and throat are chestnut. Their upper breast is gray and their lower breast and belly are yellow with black streaks except on the belly's center. Subspecies A. r. antioquiae is larger than the nominate, with darker chestnut areas and more and wider streaks on the breast and belly. Both subspecies have a bright red iris, a bill with a blue-gray base and black tip, and dark olive or olive-gray legs and feet.

== Distribution and habitat ==
The chestnut-crested cotinga has a disjunct distribution. Subspecies A. r. antioquiae is the more northerly of the two. It is found in Colombia's Central Andes from Antioquia Department to Huila Department and the Western Andes in Cauca and Valle del Cauca departments. Its range apparently extends into western Sucumbíos Province in extreme northern Ecuador. The nominate subspecies is found from southern Zamora-Chinchipe Province in extreme southern Ecuador south through Peru on the eastern Andean slope into Bolivia to Cochabamba Department.

The chestnut-crested cotinga inhabits humid montane forest and woodlands at and near tree line. In elevation it ranges between 1,800 and 2,800 m (5,900 and 9,200 ft) in Colombia, between 1,800 and 2,700 m (5,900 and 8,900 ft) in Ecuador, between 1,700 and 2,800 m (5,600 and 9,200 ft) in Peru, and between 1,300 and 3,000 m (4,300 and 9,800 ft) in Bolivia.

== Behavior ==
=== Movement ===
The chestnut-crested cotinga is a year-round resident.

=== Feeding ===
The chestnut-crested cotinga's diet has not been detailed, but appears to be mostly fruits and sometimes insects. It usually forages singly or in pairs, and usually in the forest canopy. Its technique for taking fruit is not known. It takes insects in mid-air.

=== Breeding ===
The chestnut-crested cotinga's breeding season has not been determined but includes May in Ecuador and November and December in Peru. It makes a flight display, ascending from a treetop perch in an arc to land on a different perch. The species' nest is an open cup made from lichens on a base of twigs. The only known clutch was a single egg that was greenish with dark spots. Both sexes tended that nest and incubated the egg. The incubation period, time to fledging, and other details of parental care are not known.

=== Vocal and non-vocal sounds ===
The chestnut-crested cotinga's song has been described as "a quiet, deep, nasal croak, often with a stuttered introduction: t't'ti'kreeh" and as "a dry, raspy, and nasal stuttered reh, r-r-r-r-r-réh". Its calls are "single nasal croaking notes". During the flight display, the bird's wings make audible beats on the ascent and a "braking" noise on the descent.

== Status ==
The IUCN has assessed the chestnut-crested cotinga as being of Least Concern. It has a very large range; its population size is not known and is believed to be decreasing. No immediate threats have been identified. It is considered rare and local in Colombia and Ecuador and rare in Peru. "Chestnut-crested Cotinga appears to be more limited to large expanses of intact forest than is Red-crested Cotinga, and so may be more vulnerable to habitat fragmentation."
