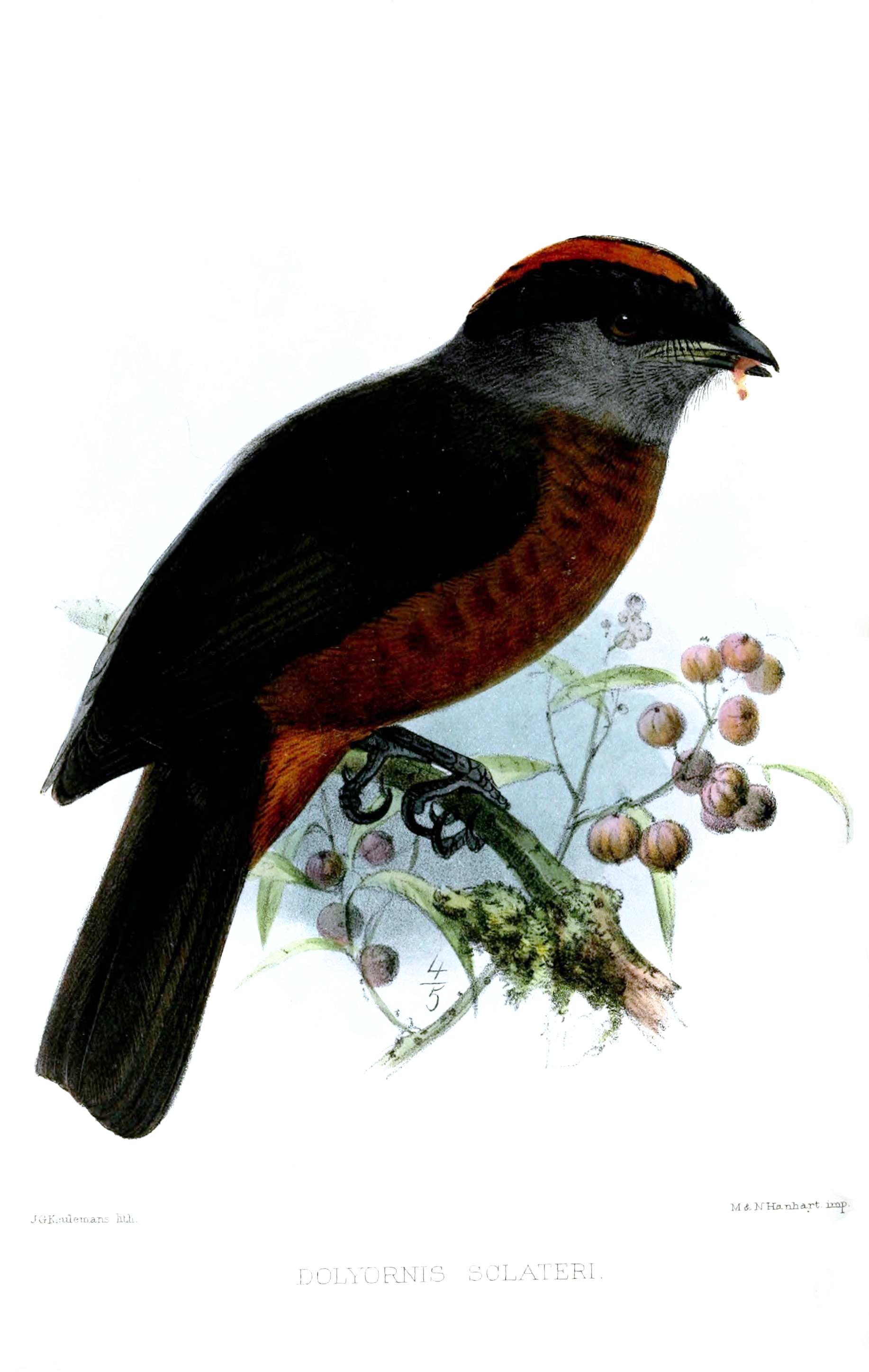
- Bay-vented cotinga (Doliornis sclateri)

Scientific classification
- Kingdom: Animalia
- Phylum: Chordata
- Class: Aves
- Order: Passeriformes
- Family: Cotingidae
- Genus: Doliornis; Taczanowski, 1874

Type species
- Doliornis sclateri Taczanowski, 1874

= Doliornis =

Genus of birds

Doliornis is a small genus of bird in the family Cotingidae. Established by Władysław Taczanowski in 1874, it contains two species:

Genus Doliornis – Taczanowski, 1874 – two species
| Common name | Scientific name and subspecies | Range | Size and ecology | IUCN status and estimated population |
|---|---|---|---|---|
| Chestnut-bellied cotinga | Doliornis remseni Robbins, Rosenberg, GH & Sornoza-Molina, 1994 | Colombia, Ecuador, and far northern Peru. | Size: Habitat: Diet: | NT |
| Bay-vented cotinga | Doliornis sclateri Taczanowski, 1874 | Peru. | Size: Habitat: Diet: | VU |

The name Deliornis is a combination of the Greek words dolios. meaning "crafty" or "wily" and ornis, meaning "bird".
