= Humedal Córdoba (TransMilenio) =

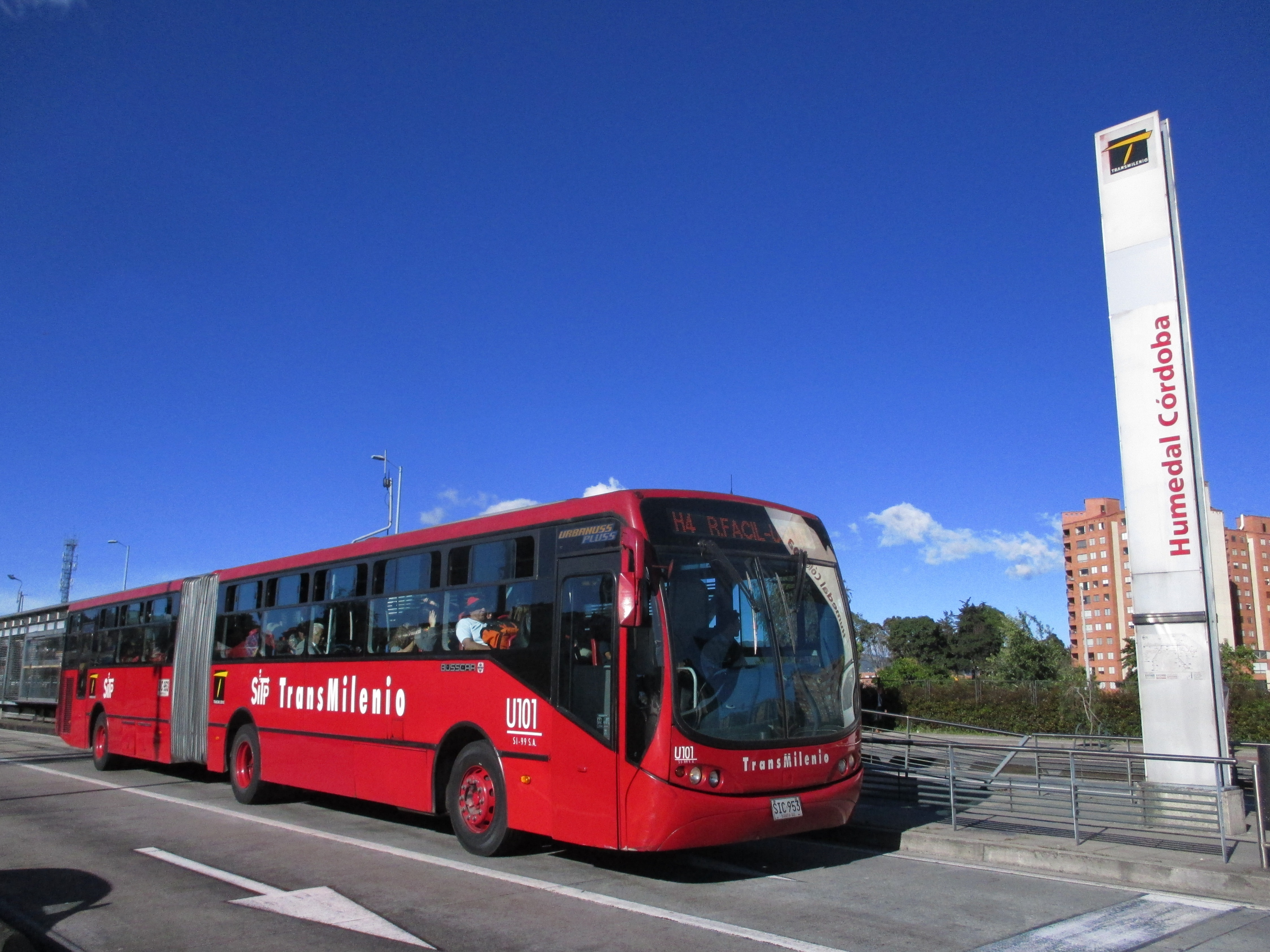

General information
- Location: Suba, Bogotá; Colombia

History
- Opened: April 29, 2006

Services
Preceding station	TransMilenio	Following station
Niza Calle 127 towards Portal de Suba	C	Av. Suba Calle 116 towards San Martín
Location

The simple station Humedal Córdoba is part of the TransMilenio mass-transit system of Bogotá, Colombia, which opened in the year 2000.

== Location ==
The station is located in northwestern Bogotá, specifically on Avenida Suba, between las Calles 120 and 121.

It serves the Niza, Niza II, and Malibú neighborhoods.

== History ==
In 2006, phase two of the TransMilenio system was completed, including the Avenida Suba line, on which this station is located.

The station is named Humedal Córdoba due to its proximity to this important body of water.

Nearby are the Ley store of Niza, the San Juan Crisóstomo church (Catholic), a Blockbuster, and the Bahía 123 shopping center.

On the night of April 25, 2011, an ambulance rammed one of the railings of the entry of this station, which suffered damage.

== Station Services ==
=== Main Line Service ===
Service as of April 29, 2006
Type	Northern Routes	Southern Routes	Frequency
Local	7	7	Every three minutes
Express Monday through Saturday; All day	C15	H15	Every two minutes

=== Feeder routes ===
This station does not have connections to feeder routes.

=== Inter-city service ===
This station does not have inter-city service.

== See also ==
- Bogotá
- TransMilenio
- List of TransMilenio Stations
