= San Francisco Botanical Garden =

Arboretum in California, US

San Francisco Botanical Garden at Strybing Arboretum
- Strybing Arboretum
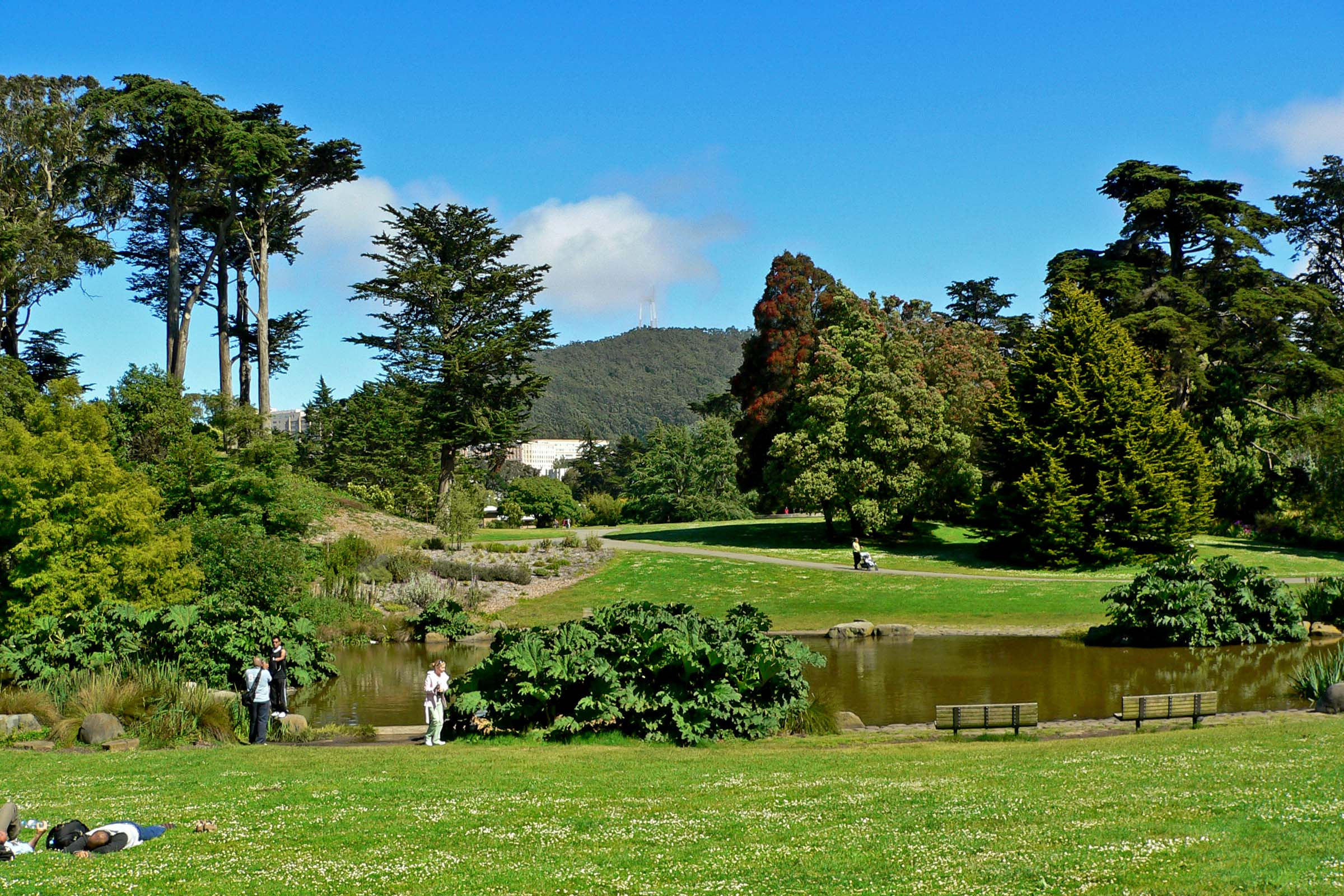
- San Francisco Botanical Garden

- Location within San Francisco County Location within California Location within the United States
- Type: Botanical garden
- Location: Golden Gate Park
- Coordinates: 37°46′06″N 122°28′12″W
- Area: 55 acres (22 ha)
- Opened: 1940
- Operator: San Francisco Recreation & Parks Department
- Visitors: Over 450,000 Annual Visits
- Status: Open year round
- Public transit: 9th and Irving
- Website: gggp.org

The San Francisco Botanical Garden at Strybing Arboretum (formerly Strybing Arboretum) is located in San Francisco's Golden Gate Park. Its 55 acres (22.3 ha) represents nearly 9,000 different kinds of plants from around the world, with particular focus on Magnolia species, high elevation palms, conifers, and cloud forest species from Central America, South America and Southeast Asia.

San Francisco's County Fair Building is located near the main entrance to the Garden.

The San Francisco Botanical Garden is now one of the three locations of the Gardens of Golden Gate Park, along with the Japanese Tea Garden and the Conservatory of Flowers.

== History ==
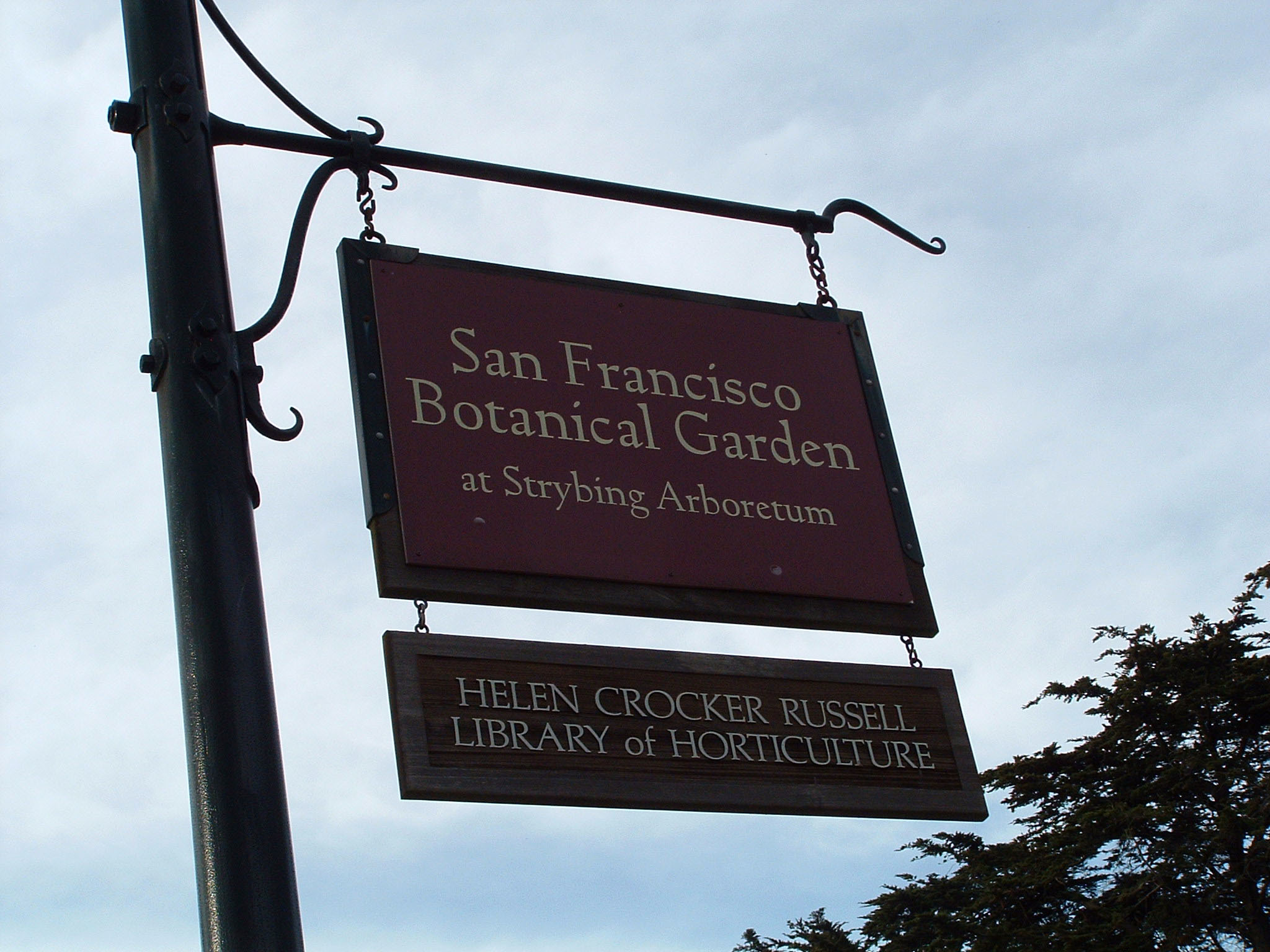

Plans for the garden were originally laid out in the 1880s by park supervisor John McLaren, but funding was insufficient to begin construction until Helene Strybing left a major bequest in 1927. Planting was begun in 1937 with WPA funds supplemented by local donations, and the Arboretum officially opened in May 1940. As a part of Golden Gate Park, it is officially managed by the San Francisco Recreation and Park Department, but the San Francisco Botanical Garden Society plays an important role in providing educational programs, managing volunteers, curatorial staff, and more. Formed in 1955, the San Francisco Botanical Garden Society (formerly the Strybing Arboretum Society) operates the Helen Crocker Russell Library of Horticulture, Garden Bookstore, and monthly plant sales, and offers a wide range of community education programs for children and adults. The Society also raises money for new projects and Garden renovations.

In 2004, Strybing Arboretum changed its name to San Francisco Botanical Garden at Strybing Arboretum, and the Arboretum Society followed suit, becoming San Francisco Botanical Garden Society at Strybing Arboretum.

== Plant collections ==
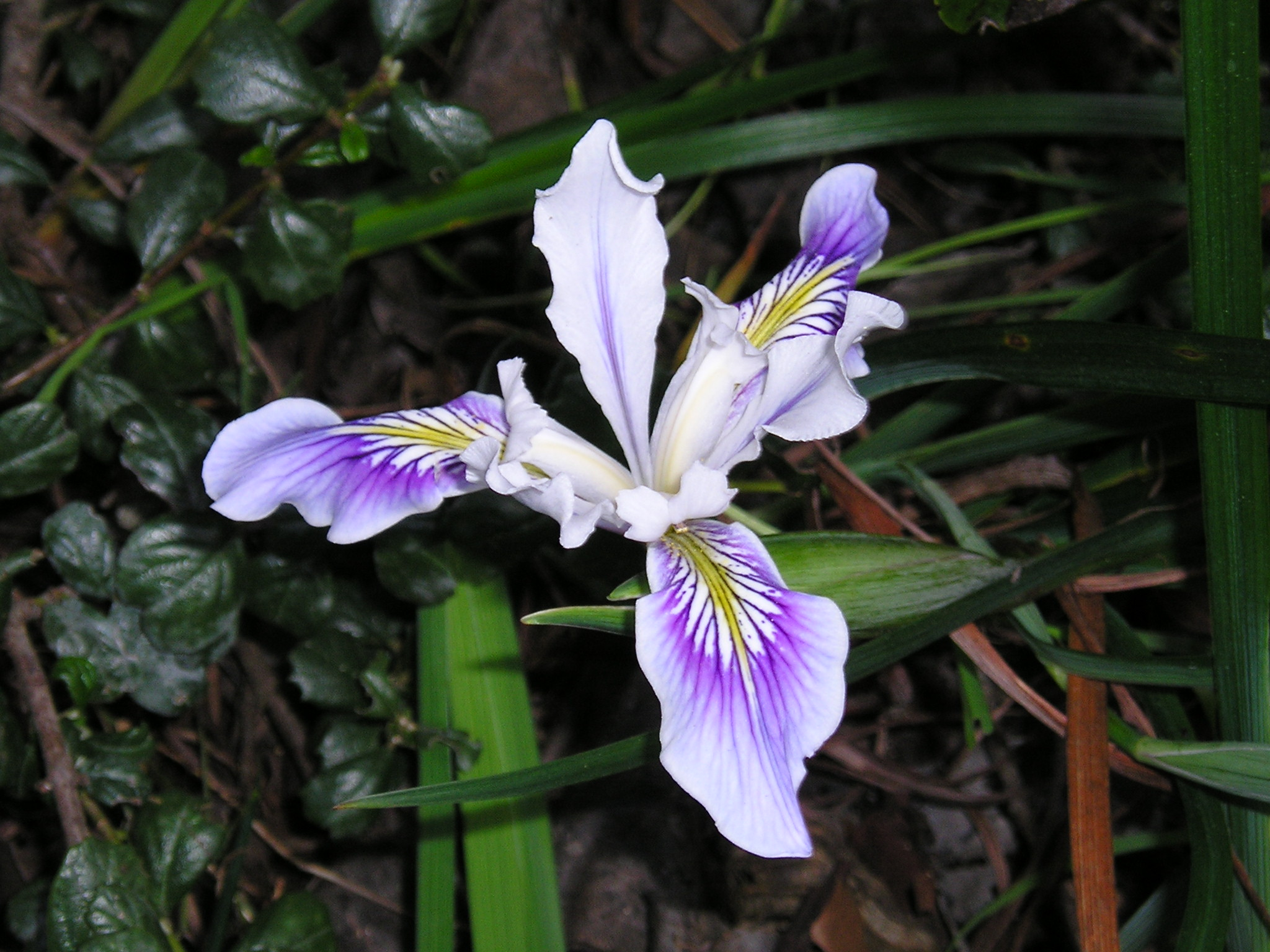
Iridaceae

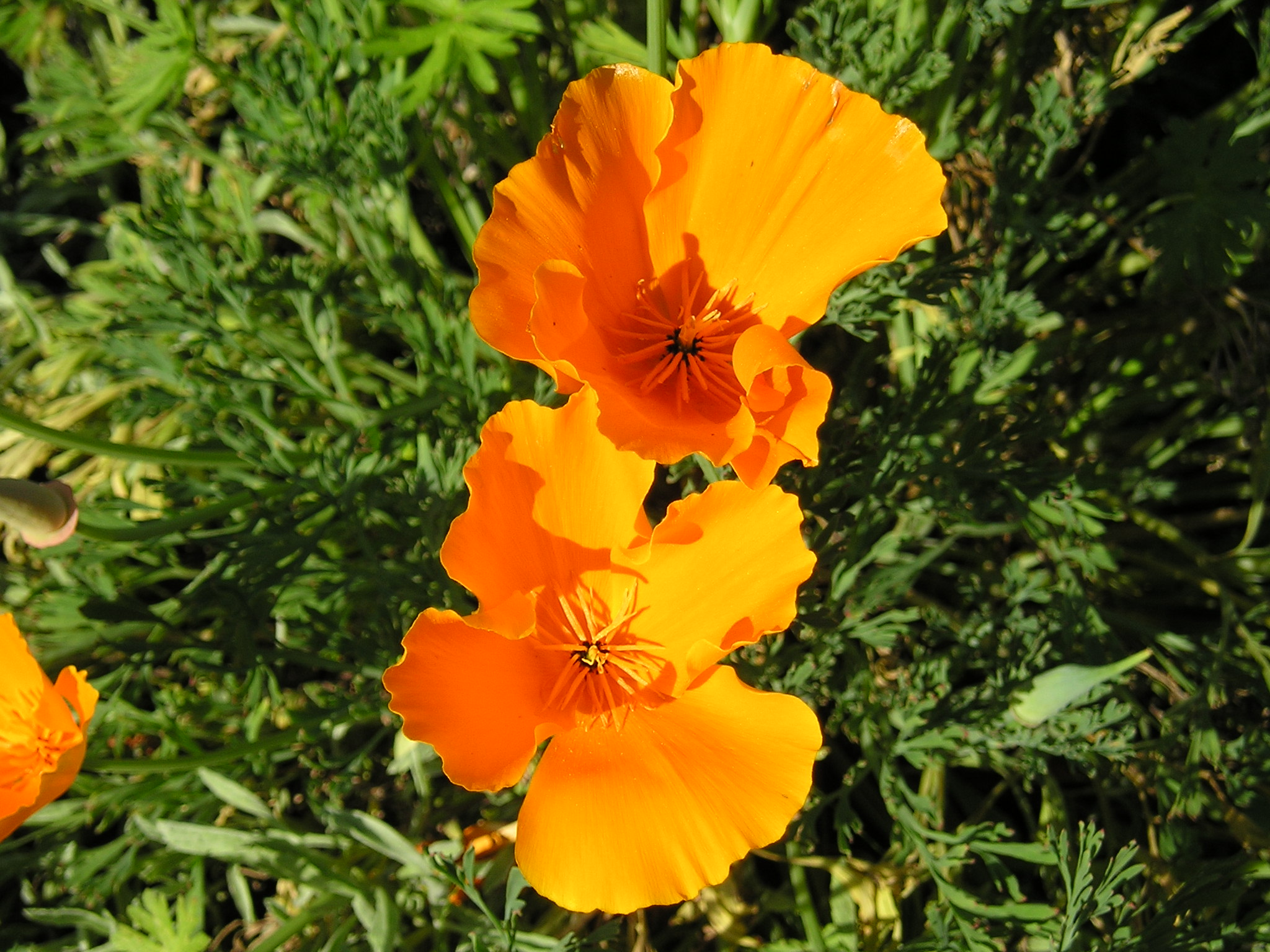
Eschscholzia

The gardens are organized into several specialized collections:

- Mediterranean
  - California Native
  - John Muir Nature Trail
  - Redwood Grove
  - Chile
  - South Africa
  - Australia
  - Mediterranean Basin Region
- Mild-temperate climate
  - New Zealand
  - Moon-viewing Garden – a Japanese design
  - Temperate Asia Garden
- Montane tropic
  - Mesoamerican Cloud Forest
  - Southeast Asian Cloud Forest (in development)
  - Andean Cloud Forest (in development)
- Specialty collections
  - Ancient Plant Garden
  - Succulent garden
  - Dwarf Conifer garden
  - Exhibition Garden
  - Garden of Fragrance
  - Zellerbach Garden of Perennials
  - Dry Mexico
  - Rhododendron Garden
  - Magnolias & Camellias (found in many collections)

The mild Mediterranean climate is ideal for plants from surprisingly many parts of the world; the arboretum does not include greenhouses for species requiring other climate types.

== Gallery ==
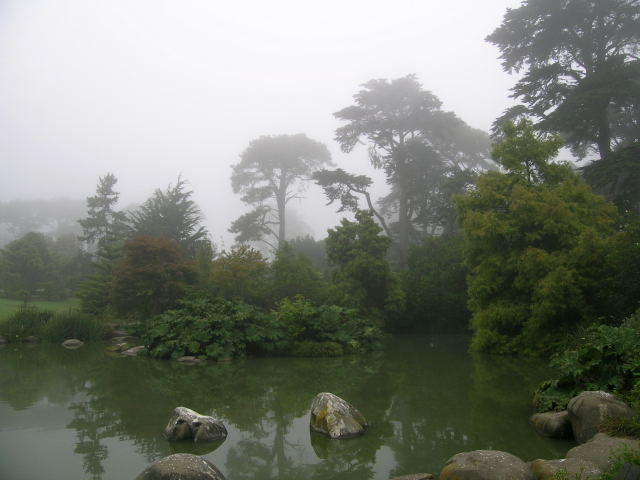
McBean Wildfowl Pond and Primitive Plant Garden

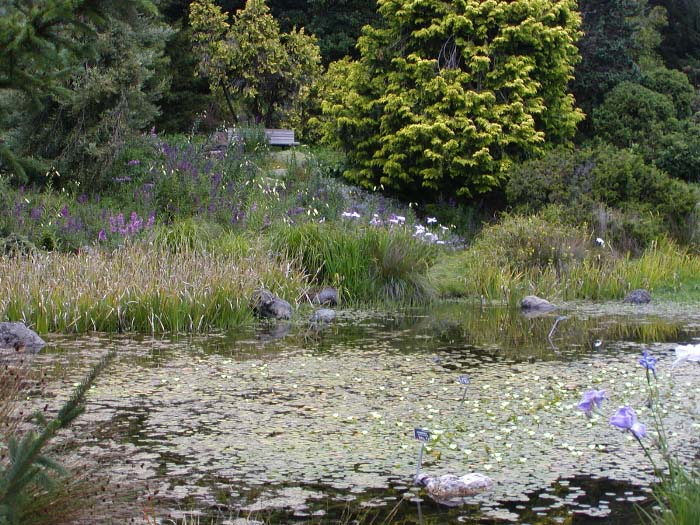
Pond at Dwarf Conifer collection

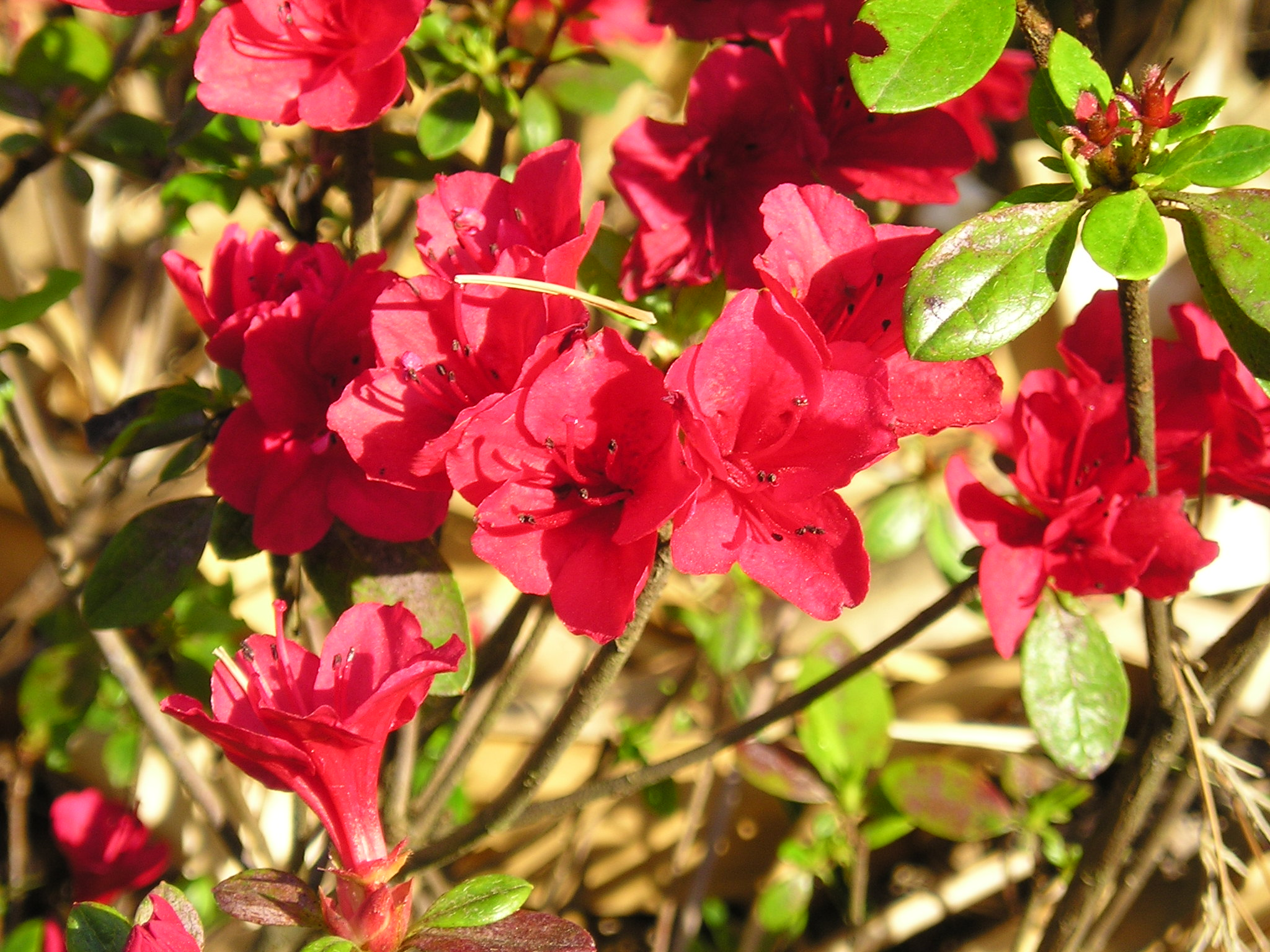
Rhododendron

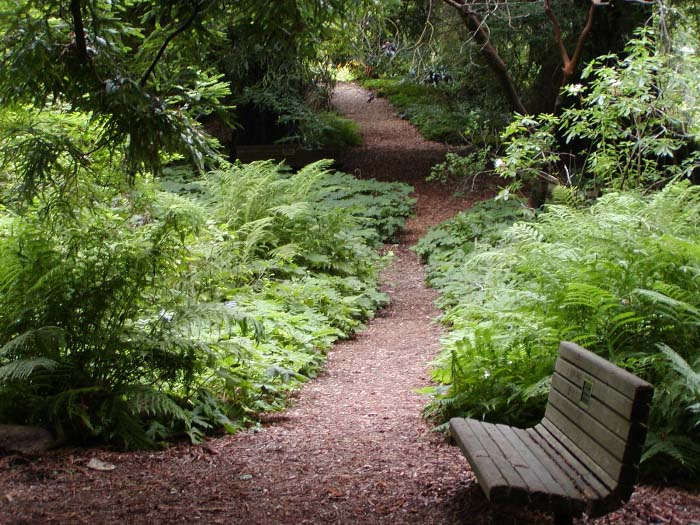
Redwood trail

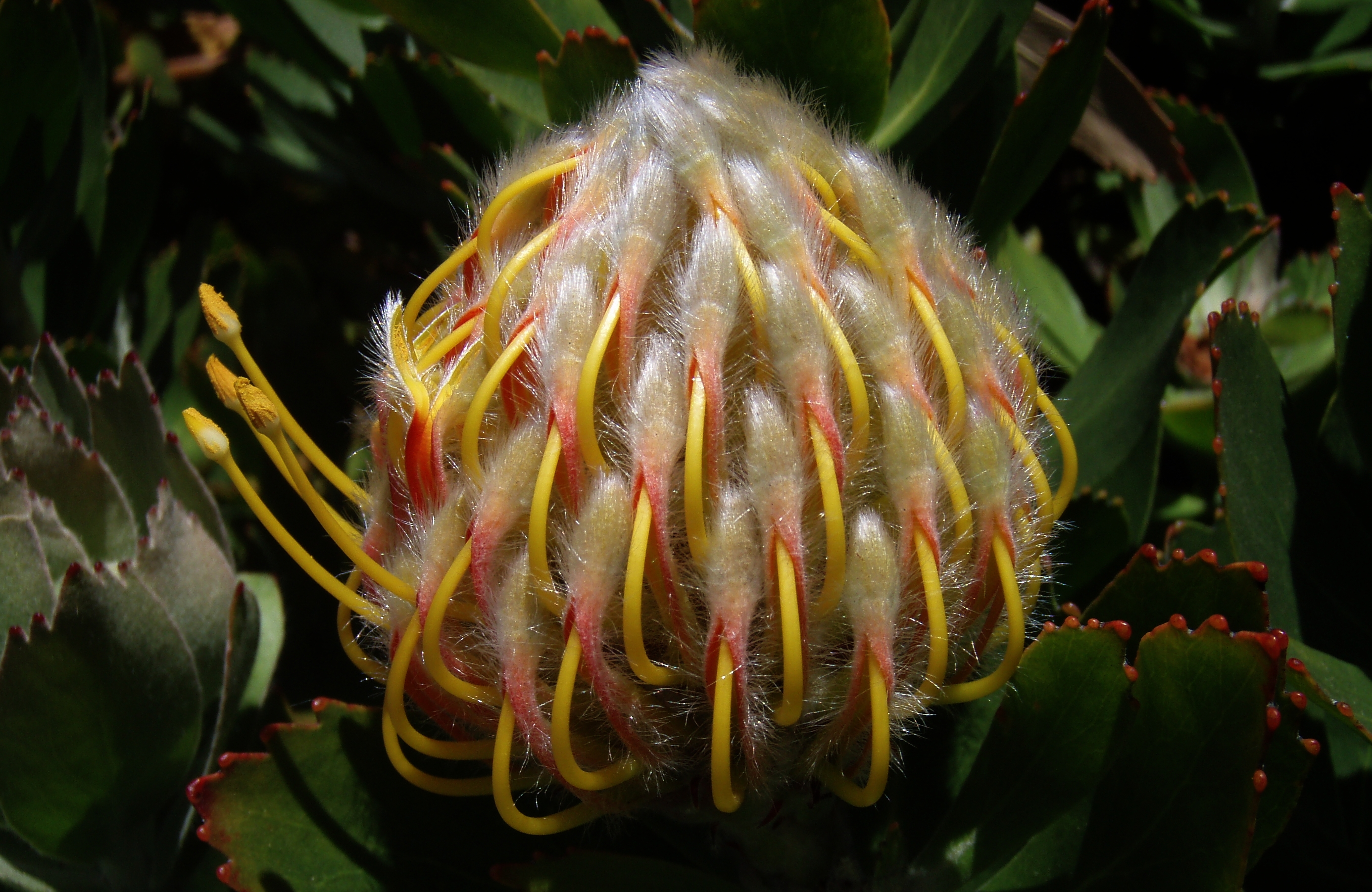
Nodding Pincushion Protea Flower Bud

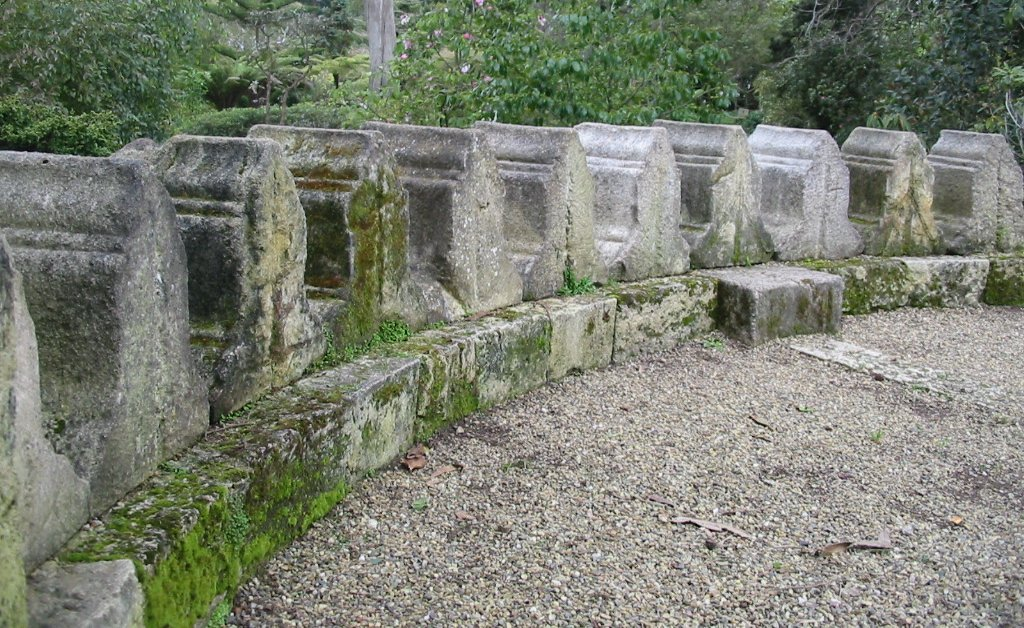
Stones from the Spanish monastery Santa Maria de Ovila can be found in the library reading patio, the Rhododendron pavilion, and the Garden of Fragrance.

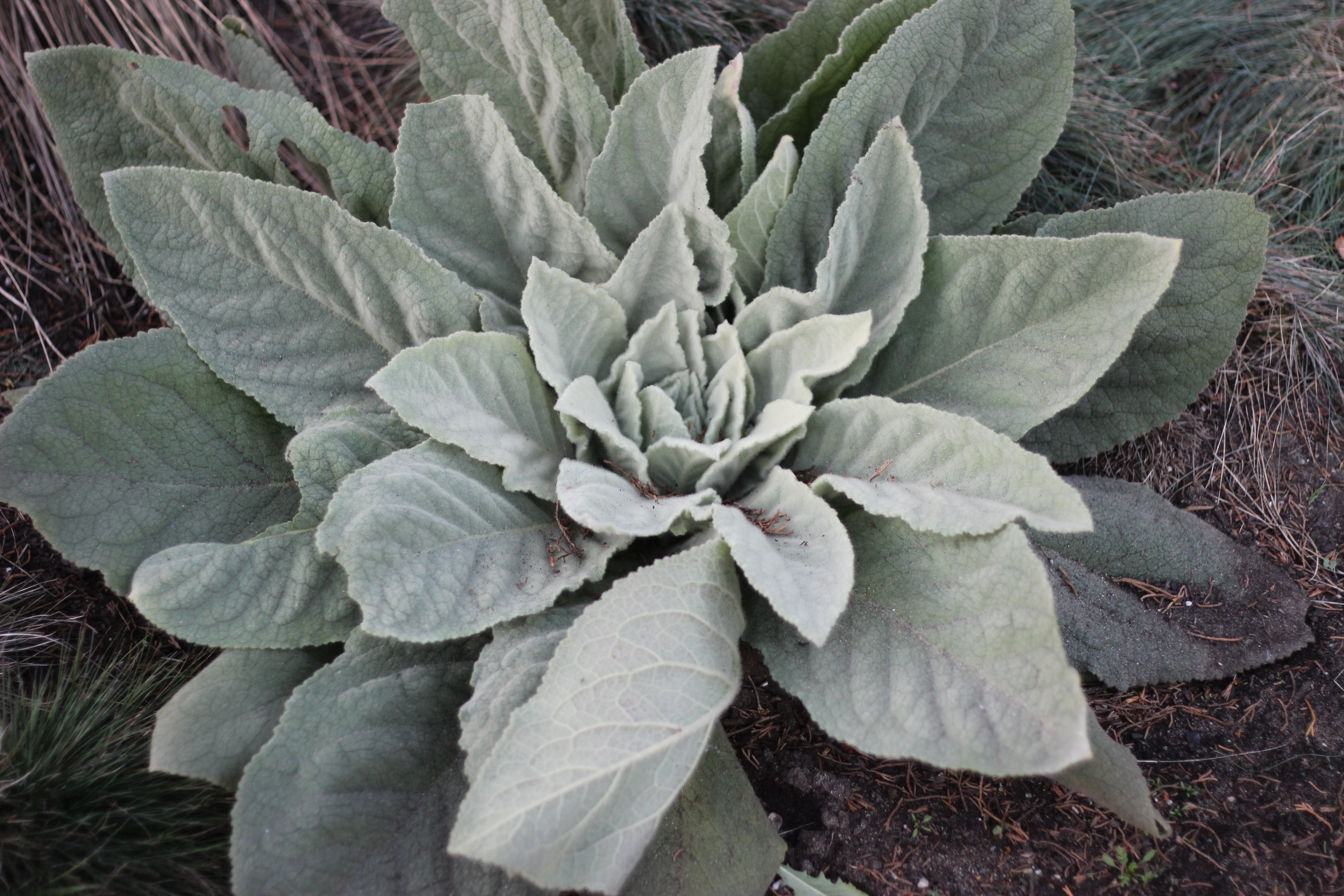
Verbascum

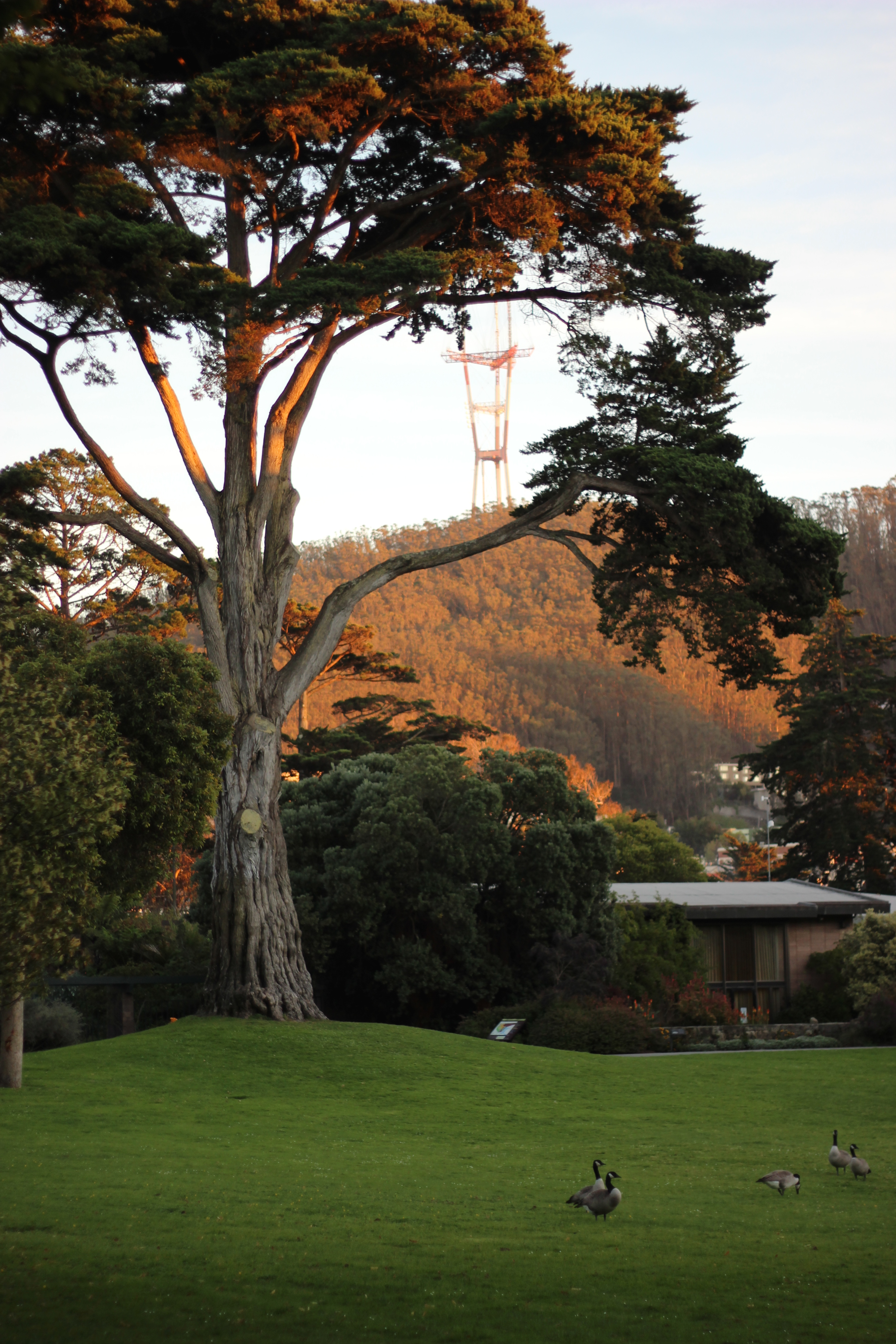
Meadow in the garden.

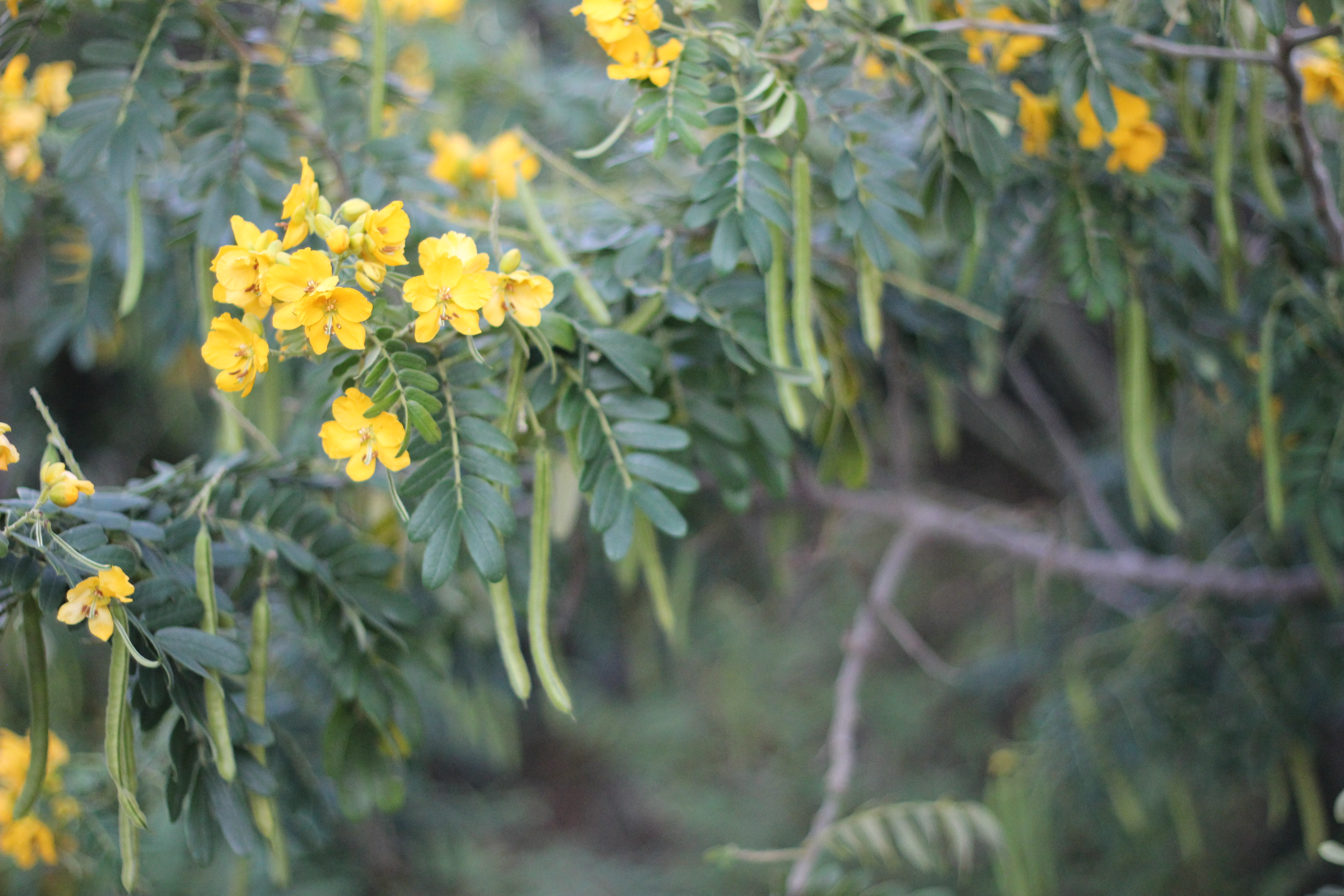
Glandular Senna (Senna multiglandulosa) in San Francisco Botanical Garden

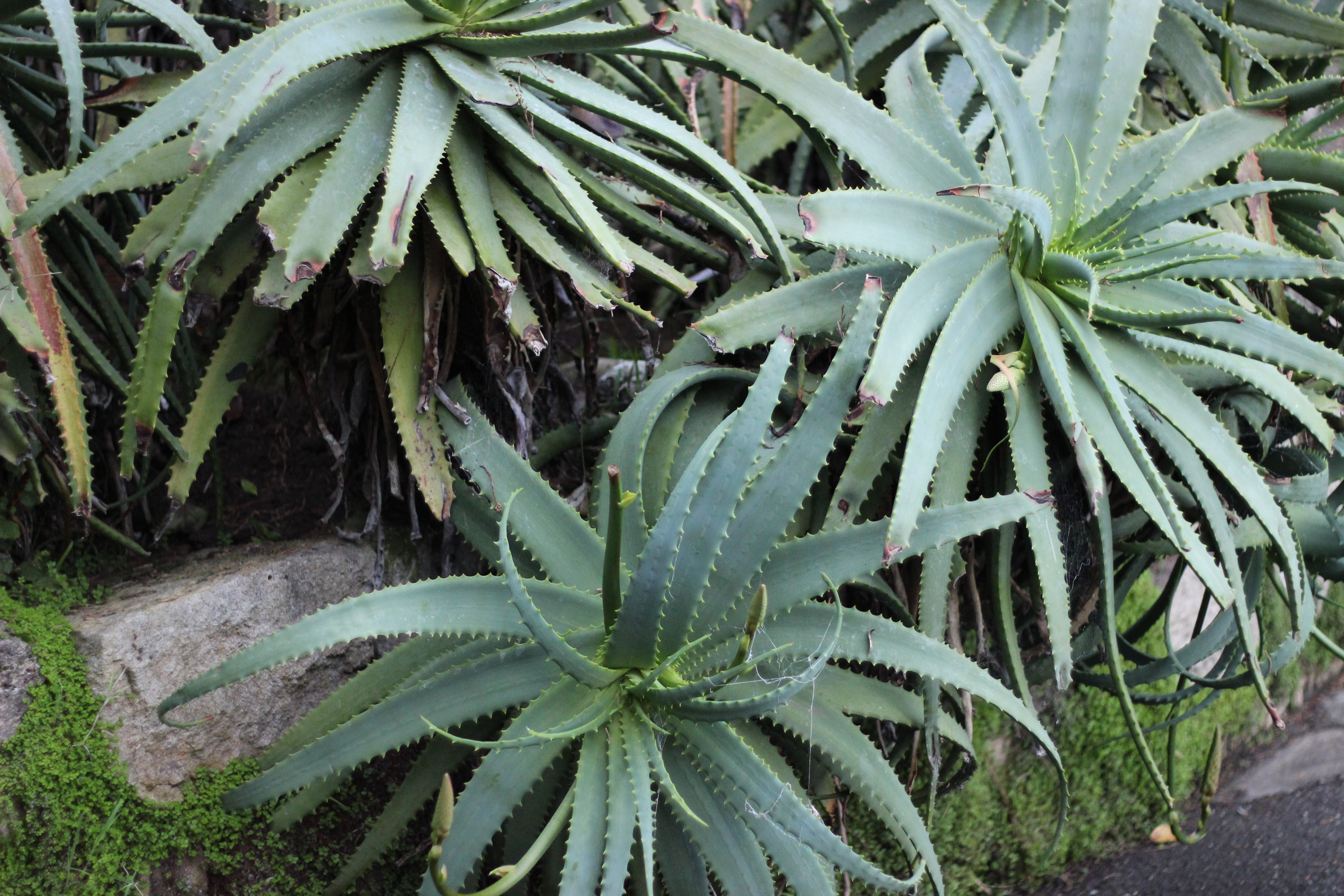
Candelabra Aloe (Aloe arborescens) at San Francisco Botanical Garden

== See also ==
- California native plants
- List of botanical gardens in the United States
- North American Plant Collections Consortium
- 49-Mile Scenic Drive
