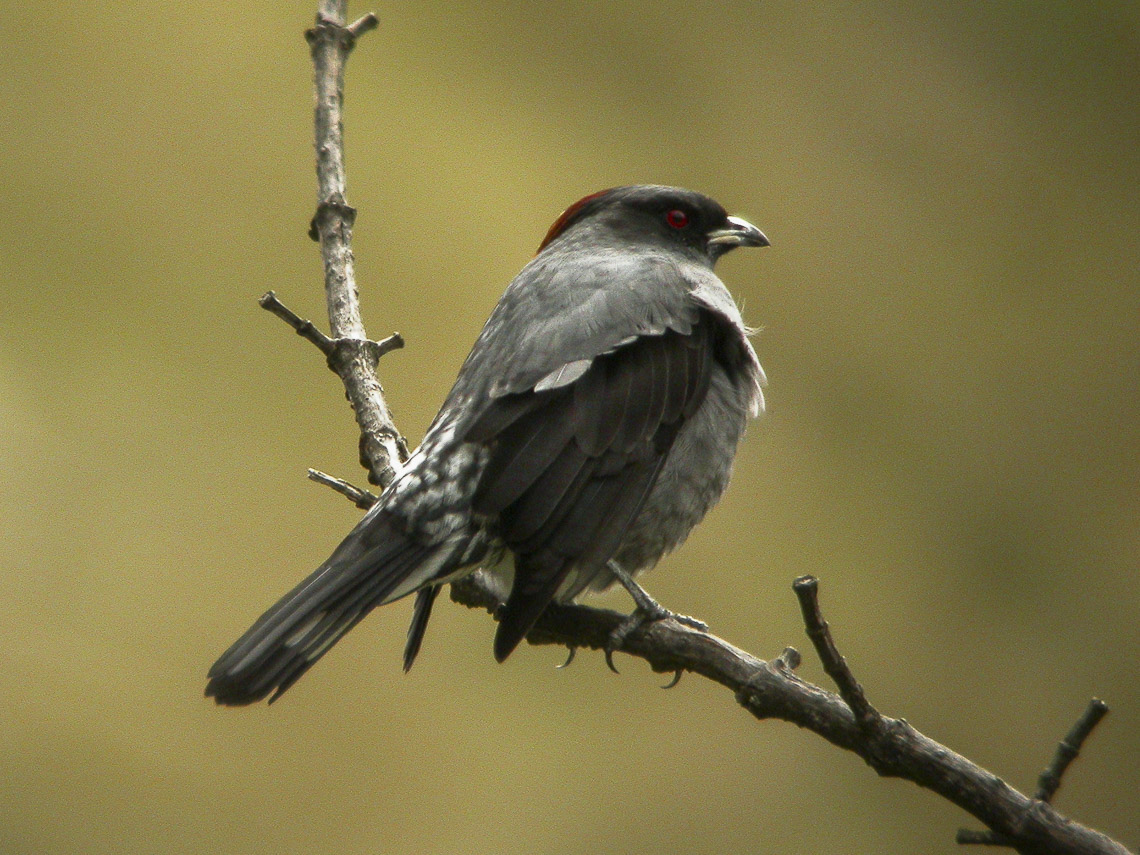

Conservation status
- Least Concern (IUCN 3.1)

Scientific classification
- Kingdom: Animalia
- Phylum: Chordata
- Class: Aves
- Order: Passeriformes
- Family: Cotingidae
- Genus: Ampelion
- Species: A. rubrocristatus

Binomial name
- Ampelion rubrocristatus (d'Orbigny & Lafresnaye, 1837)

= Red-crested cotinga =

Species of bird

The red-crested cotinga (Ampelion rubrocristatus) is a species of bird in the family Cotingidae. It is found in Bolivia, Colombia, Ecuador, Peru, and Venezuela.

== Taxonomy and systematics ==
The red-crested cotinga is monotypic. It shares genus Ampelion with the chestnut-crested cotinga (A. rufaxilla). Early in the twentieth century some authors had placed both of them in genus Heliochera, which no longer exists.

== Description ==
The red-crested cotinga is 20.5 to 22 cm (8.1 to 8.7 in) long and weighs 47 to 80 g (1.7 to 2.8 oz). The sexes have the same plumage. Adults have a dark gray head with a long chestnut-maroon crest which is usually held flat against the nape. Their body is gray and their wings and tail mostly a darker gray. Their upper- and undertail coverts, rump, and vent area have variable amounts of white streaking. The underside of their tail has a white band near the end. They have a deep red iris, a bill with an ivory-white or pale gray base and blackish gray tip, and black or dark gray legs and feet. Immatures are overall paler than adults due to pale fringes on their feathers.

== Distribution and habitat ==
The red-crested cotinga has a disjunct distribution. It is found in the isolated Sierra Nevada de Santa Marta in northern Colombia, in the Serranía del Perijá that straddles the Colombia-Venezuela border, in the Andes from northeastern Trujillo in Venezuela into the northern part of Colombia's Eastern Andes, and nearly continuously in the Andes from Colombia's Central and Western ranges south through Ecuador and Peru into Bolivia as far as Santa Cruz Department. In Peru it is found on the west side of the Andes as far south as Ancash Department and along the eastern side for most of the country's length.

The red-crested cotinga inhabits semi-open landscapes in the temperate zone including the edges of cloudforest and humid woodlands (including Polylepis), páramo with some patches of trees and bushes, and locally borders of agricultural areas that have trees. In elevation it ranges between 2,500 and 3,250 m (8,200 and 10,700 ft) in Venezuela, between 2,300 and 3,800 m (7,500 and 12,500 ft) in Colombia, mostly between 2,500 and 3,500 m (8,200 and 11,500 ft) in Ecuador, and between 2,400 and 3,700 m (7,900 and 12,100 ft) in Peru.

== Behavior ==
=== Movement ===
The red-crested cotinga is believed to be a year-round resident.

=== Feeding ===
The red-crested cotinga feeds mostly on fruits and occasionally includes some insects in its diet. It forages singly, in pairs, or in small groups. It usually plucks fruit with short sallies from a perch and less often while perched. It takes insects in mid-air.

=== Breeding ===
The red-crested cotinga does not appear to have well-defined breeding seasons along its range. However, its seasons include January in Peru and November in Bolivia. It makes a courtship display by raising its crest, lifting its tail, and bowing. The species' nest is a large cup made from moss, lichen, and twigs and is typically in a bush or tree between 1.3 and 3 m (4 and 10 ft) above the ground. The clutch size, incubation period, time to fledging, and details of parental care are not known.

=== Vocalization ===
The red-crested cotinga's song has been described as "a stuttered series of deep notes ending in a short croak: ke-ke-ke-kerrr" and as "a frog-like k-k-k-k-k-rrrréh". Its calls are "a deep chucking note and a deep, croaking, crek".

== Status ==
The IUCN has assessed the red-crested cotinga as being of Least Concern. It has a very large range; its population size is not known and is believed to be decreasing. No immediate threats have been identified. It is considered "less numerous...than southward" in Venezuela, "common and conspicuous" in Colombia, common in Ecuador, and "uncommon to fairly common and widespread" in Peru. It is found "in several protected areas throughout range, including Sierra Nevada National Park (Venezuela), Munchique National Park (Colombia) and Podocarpus National Park (Ecuador)". Its "tolerance of variety of disturbed habitats should ensure its survival".
