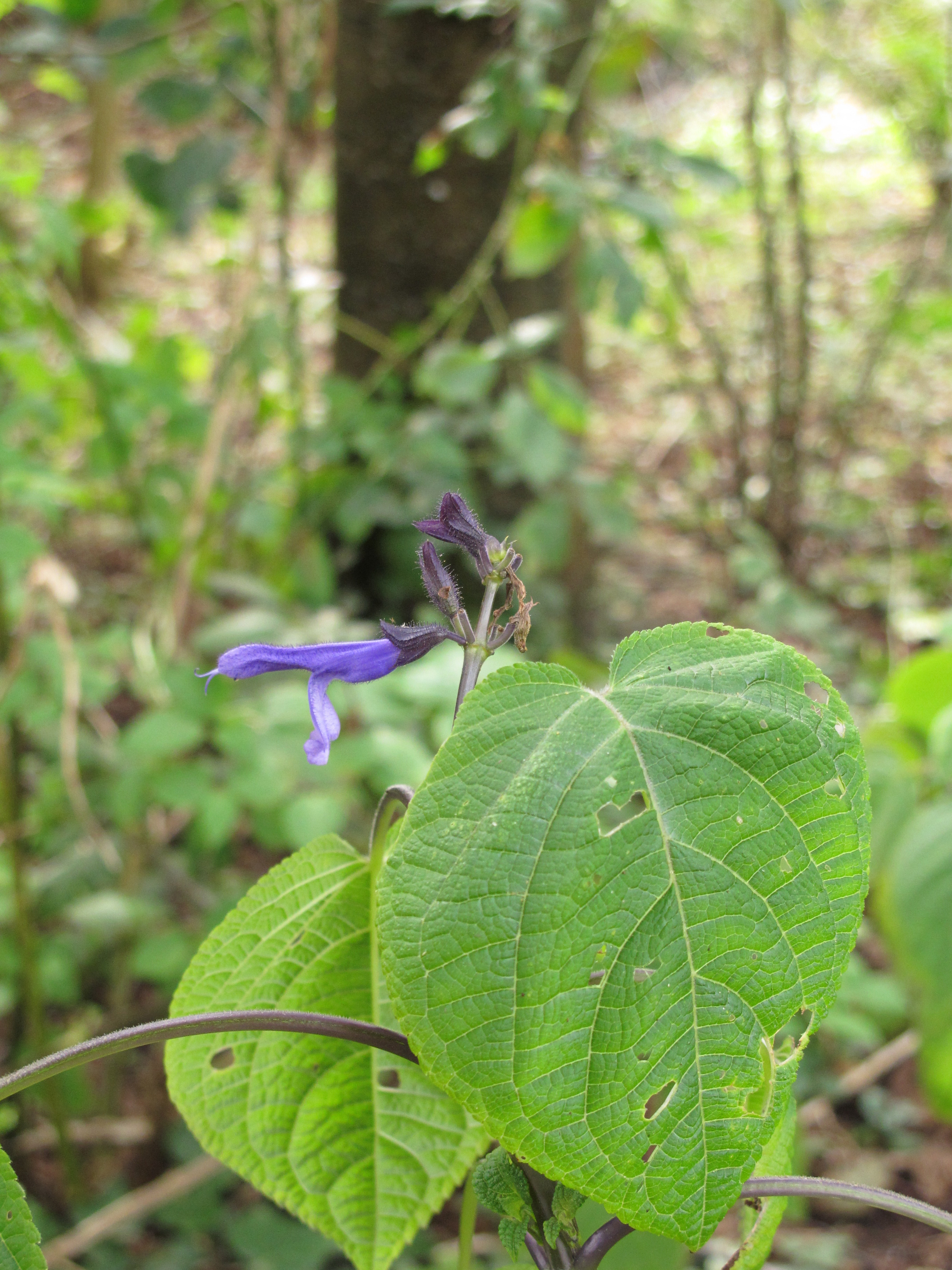

Scientific classification
- Kingdom: Plantae
- Clade: Tracheophytes
- Clade: Angiosperms
- Clade: Eudicots
- Clade: Asterids
- Order: Lamiales
- Family: Lamiaceae
- Genus: Salvia
- Species: S. recurva

Binomial name
- Salvia recurva Benth.

= Salvia recurva =

Species of flowering plant

Salvia recurva is a woody-based perennial native to the cloud forests of Central America, limited to the northern slopes of Oaxaca, Chiapas, and Guatemala at elevations around 10,000 feet (3,000 m). It grows where there is year-round warmth and abundant moisture in the air and on the forest floor. Salvia recurva was described by George Bentham in 1848, with the specific epithet referring to the distinct curve in the inflorescence when it first appears.

Salvia recurva grows to 6 feet high and 4 feet wide, and is covered with large ovate leaves that are 6 inches long and wide, with the back of the leaf having pronounced veins. The upper surface of the leaf is purple, along with the petiole, which can reach 6 inches long. Inflorescences reach 1 foot long, with flowers in whorls of 6–12, many of them blooming at once. When the inflorescence begins growing, all that can be seen are tightly packed lime-green calyces, which turn purple as the flower matures. The showy and elegant flowers are dark purple, reaching 2 inches in length, with the upper lip lightly covered in hairs, and the lower lip descending downward. The calyces are large, turning dark purple, along with the stem of the inflorescence.
