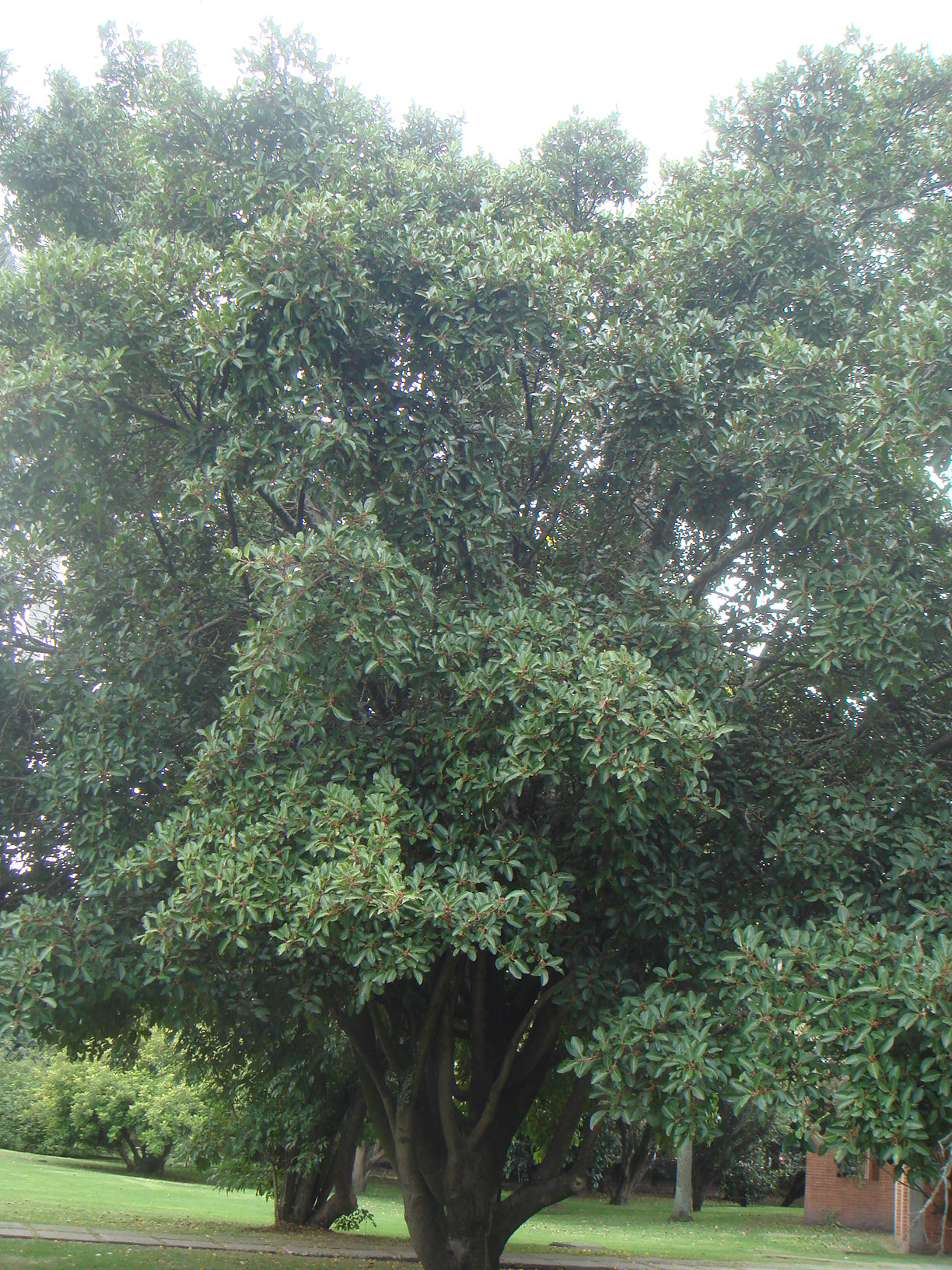

Conservation status
- Least Concern (IUCN 3.1)

Scientific classification
- Kingdom: Plantae
- Clade: Tracheophytes
- Clade: Angiosperms
- Clade: Eudicots
- Clade: Rosids
- Order: Rosales
- Family: Moraceae
- Genus: Ficus
- Species: F. soatensis

Binomial name
- Ficus soatensis Dugand

Synonyms
- Ficus soatensis var. bogotensis Dugand

= Ficus soatensis =

Species of flowering plant

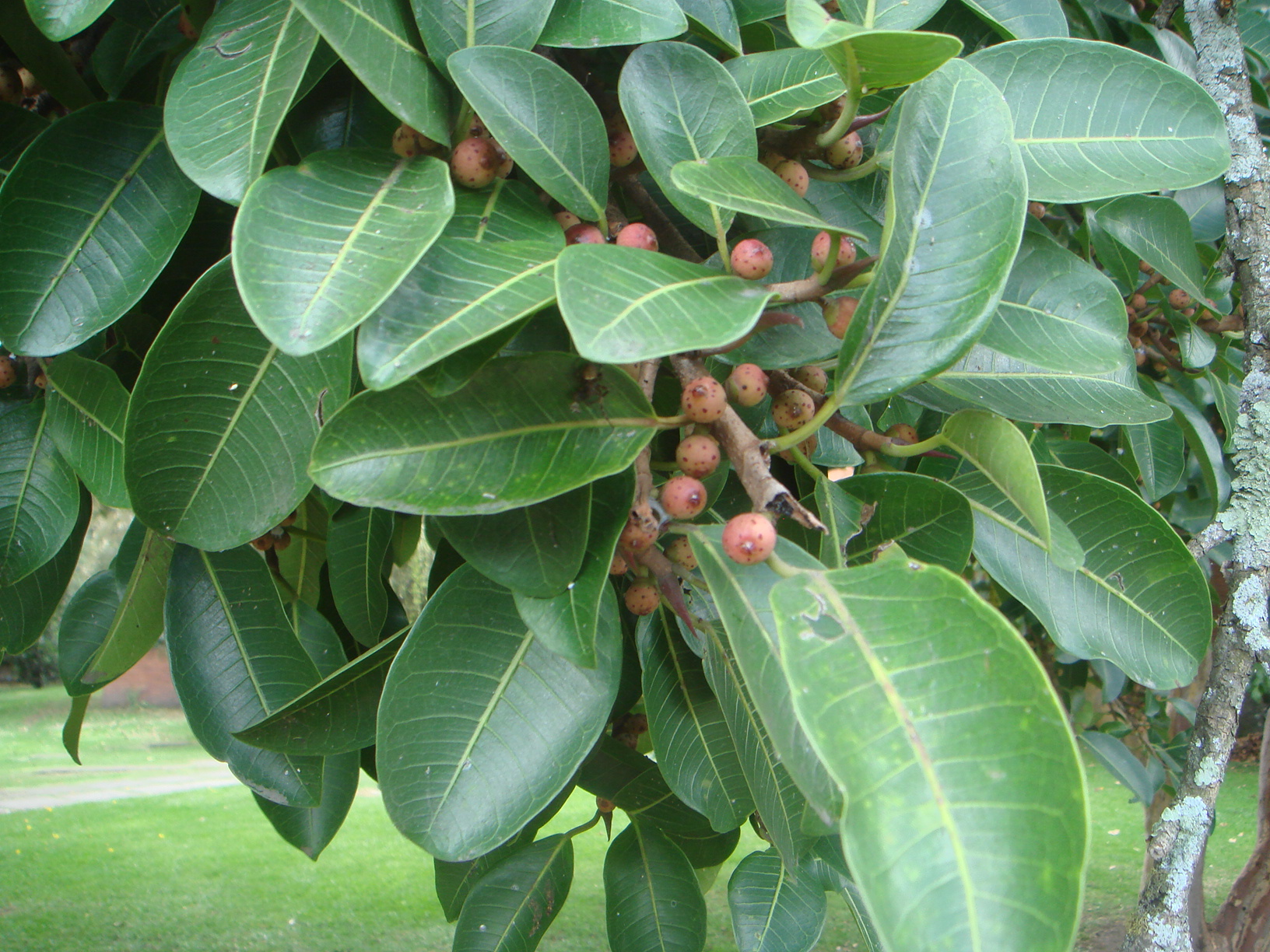
foliage and fruit

Ficus soatensis, commonly known as caucho, is a species of flowering plant in the fig family (Moraceae). It is a tree endemic to Colombia, where it is known from 21 subpopulations in northern Andes. It grows in montane tropical rain forest and páramo (subalpine grassland) from 1,200 to 3,900 metres elevation. It is pollinated by wasps of the family Agaonidae and its fruit is probably dispersed by birds.

The species was described by Armando Dugand in 1942.
