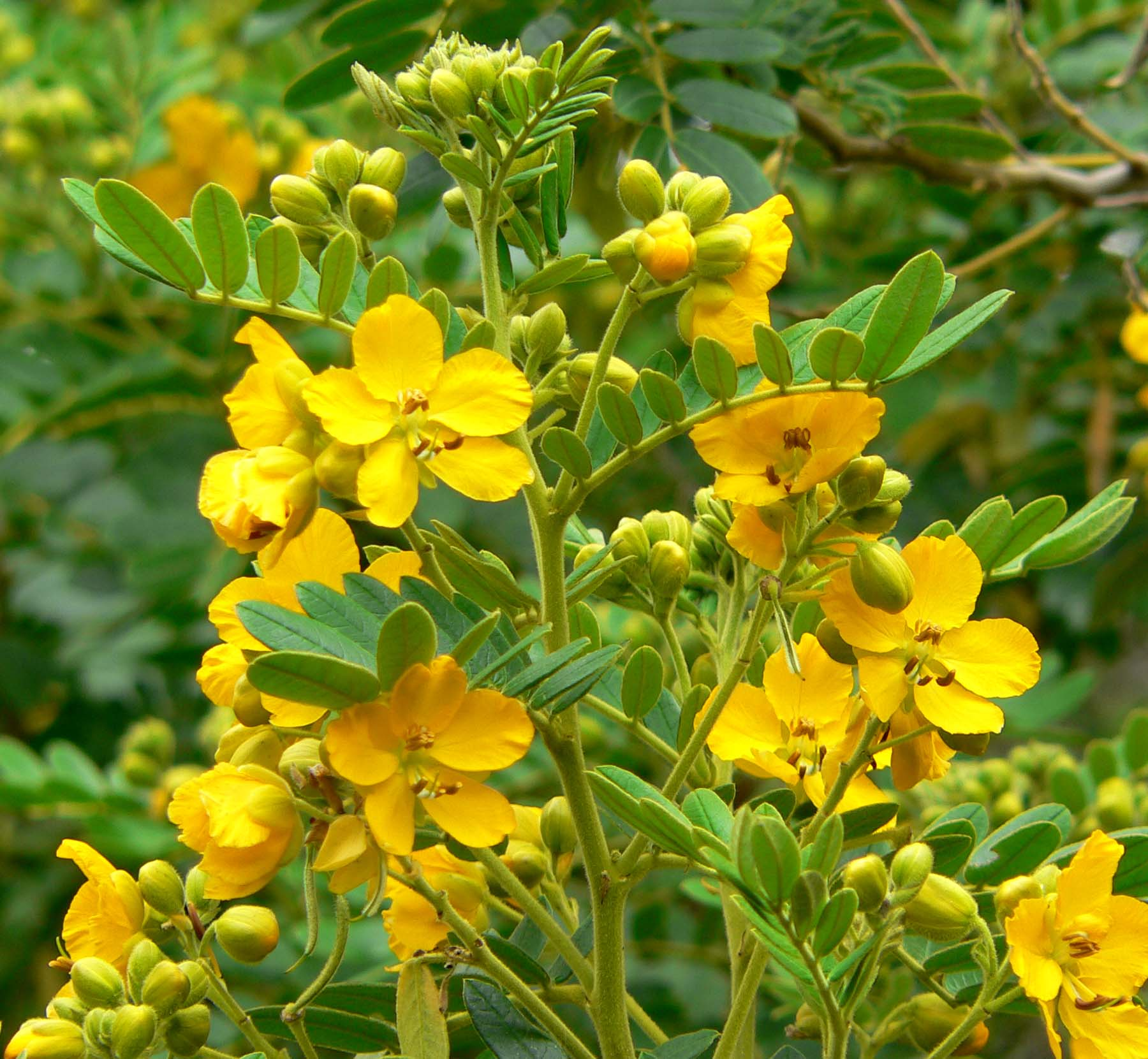

Scientific classification
- Kingdom: Plantae
- Clade: Tracheophytes
- Clade: Angiosperms
- Clade: Eudicots
- Clade: Rosids
- Order: Fabales
- Family: Fabaceae
- Subfamily: Caesalpinioideae
- Genus: Senna
- Species: S. multiglandulosa

Binomial name
- Senna multiglandulosa (Jacq.) Arn.) H.S.Irwin & Barneby

Synonyms
- List: Cassia multiglandulosa Jacq.; Adipera tomentosa (L.f.) Britton & Rose; Cassia albida Ortega; Cassia cana Schrank ex Steud.; Cassia lutescens G.Don; Cassia pubescens Ruiz & Pav. ex G.Don nom. illeg.; Cassia tomentosa L.f.; Cassia tomentosa var. albida (Ortega) Collad.; Cassia wightiana Graham

= Senna multiglandulosa =

Species of legume

Senna multiglandulosa, commonly known as glandular senna, downy senna, or buttercup bush is a species of flowering plant in the family Fabaceae and is native to Mexico, Guatemala, and western parts of South America. It is a shrub with pinnate leaves, usually with six to eight pairs of linear to lance-shaped leaflets, and yellow flowers arranged in groups of ten to twenty, with seven fertile stamens in each flower. It is widely cultivated as an ornamental plant and in some areas of the world has become naturalized.

== Description ==
Senna multiglandulosa is a shrub that typically grows to a height of up to 4 m (13 ft) and has woolly-hairy stems. The leaves are pinnate, 60–80 mm (2.4–3.1 in) long on a petiole 8–12 mm (0.31–0.47 in) long, with six to eight pairs of linear to lance-shaped or oblong leaflets 20–40 mm (0.79–1.57 in) long and 8–12 mm (0.31–0.47 in) wide, spaced 8–12 mm (0.31–0.47 in) apart. There are two to four glands between the lowest pairs of leaflets. The flowers are yellow and arranged on the ends of branchlets and in upper leaf axils in groups of ten to twenty on a peduncle 20–30 mm (0.79–1.18 in) long, each flower on a pedicel 10–12 mm (0.39–0.47 in) long. The petals are 10–20 mm (0.39–0.79 in) long and there are seven fertile stamens, the anthers varying in length from 4 to 7 mm (0.16 to 0.28 in) long, and three staminodes. Flowering occurs from spring to autumn in Australia, and the fruit is a cylindrical pod 60–80 mm (2.4–3.1 in) long, about 6–8 mm (0.24–0.31 in) wide and softly-hairy.

== Taxonomy ==
This species was first formally described in 1783 by Nikolaus Joseph von Jacquin, who gave it the name Cassia multiglandulosa in his Icones Plantarum Rariorum. In 1982, Howard Samuel Irwin and Rupert Charles Barneby transferred the species to the genus Senna as S. multiglandulosa in Memoirs of the New York Botanical Garden.

== Distribution and habitat ==
Senna multiglandulosa is native to Central and South America, but has been introduced to Australia, New Zealand and New Caledonia. It is sparingly naturalised in south-eastern South Australia, south-western Victoria and near the eastern part of border between Victoria and New South Wales.
