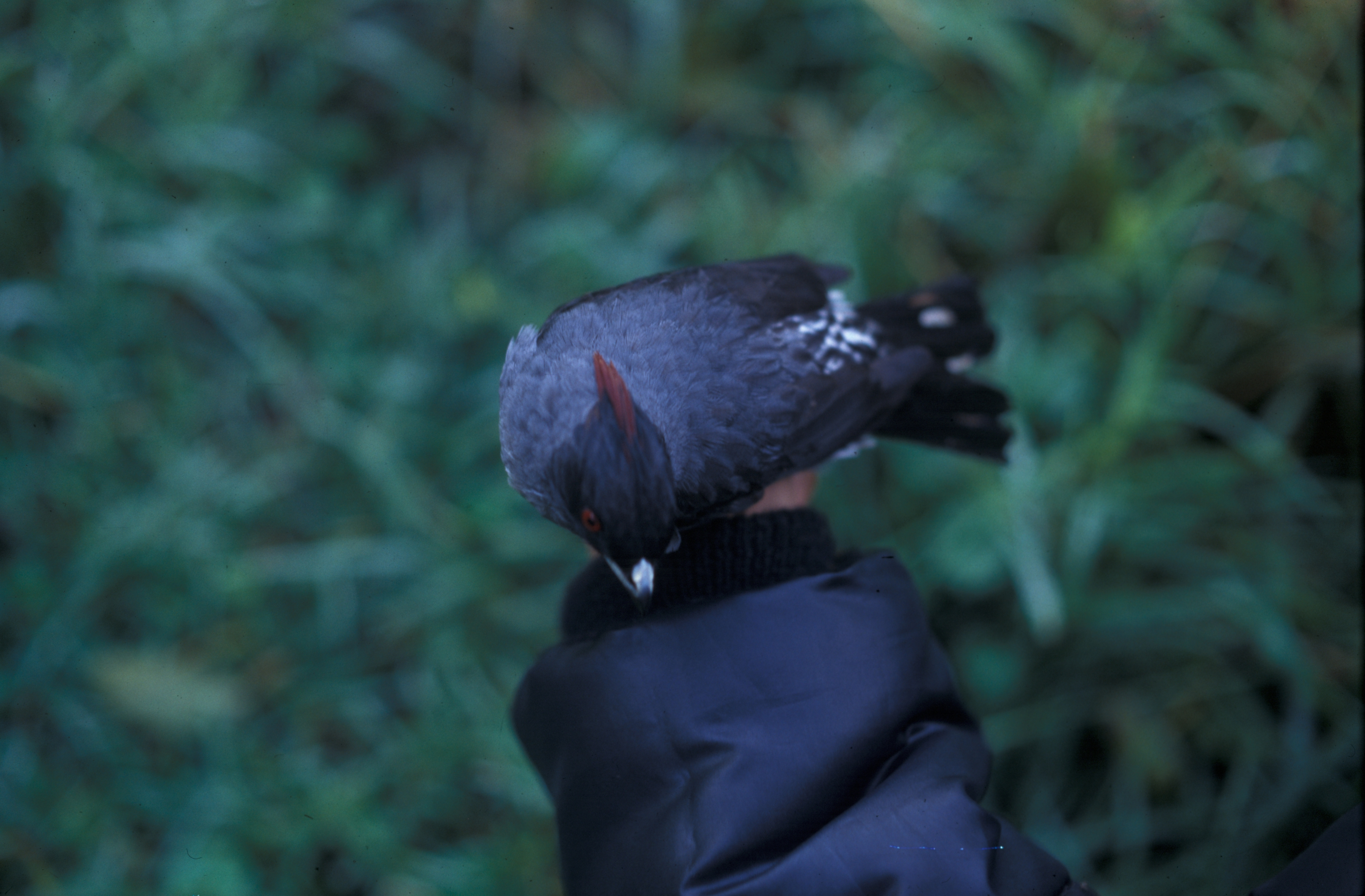
- Red-crested cotinga (Ampelion rubrocristatus)

Scientific classification
- Kingdom: Animalia
- Phylum: Chordata
- Class: Aves
- Order: Passeriformes
- Family: Cotingidae
- Genus: Ampelion; Tschudi, 1845

Type species
- Ampelis rufaxilla von Tschudi, 1844

= Ampelion =

Genus of birds

Ampelion is a genus of passerine birds in the family Cotingidae. It contains the following species:

Genus Ampelion – Tschudi, 1845 – two species
Common name	Scientific name and subspecies	Range	Size and ecology	IUCN status and estimated population
Red-crested cotinga	Ampelion rubrocristatus (d'Orbigny & Lafresnaye, 1837)	Bolivia, Colombia, Ecuador, Peru, and Venezuela	Size: Habitat: Diet:	LC
Chestnut-crested cotinga	Ampelion rufaxilla (Tschudi, 1844)	Bolivia, Colombia, Ecuador, and Peru	Size: Habitat: Diet:	LC
