= P. formosa =

P. formosa may refer to:

- Parahebe formosa, a plant endemic to Tasmania
- Partula formosa, an extinct snail
- Pempelia formosa, a snout moth
- Phryganopteryx formosa, a Malagasy moth
- Phylloxiphia formosa, an African moth
- Pipreola formosa, a bird endemic to Venezuela
- Pitcairnia formosa, a New World plant
- Pleurotomella formosa, a sea snail
- Poecilia formosa, a freshwater fish
