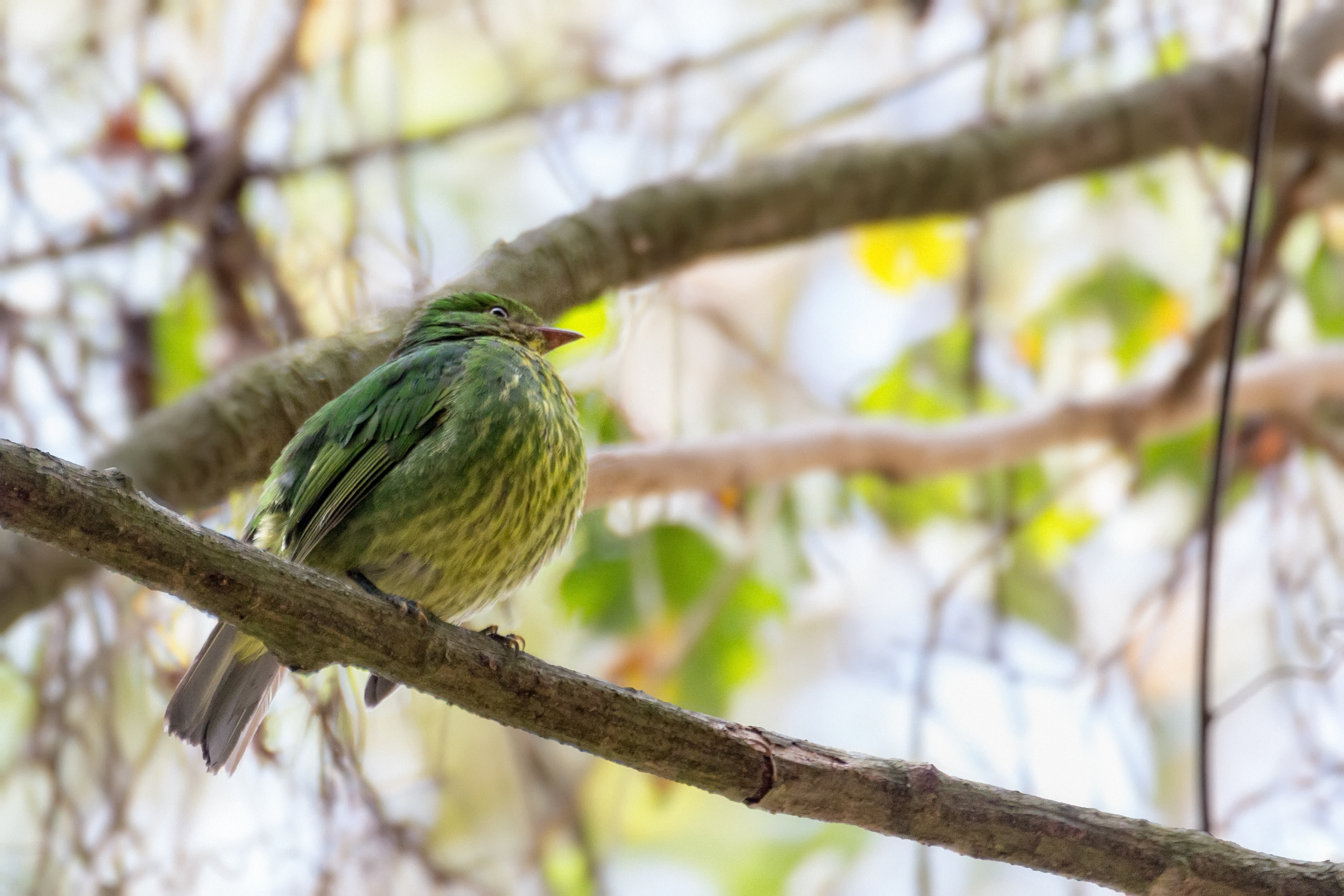

Conservation status
- Least Concern (IUCN 3.1)

Scientific classification
- Kingdom: Animalia
- Phylum: Chordata
- Class: Aves
- Order: Passeriformes
- Family: Cotingidae
- Genus: Pipreola
- Species: P. aureopectus

Binomial name
- Pipreola aureopectus (Lafresnaye, 1843)

= Golden-breasted fruiteater =

Species of bird

The golden-breasted fruiteater (Pipreola aureopectus) is a species of bird in the family Cotingidae, the cotingas. It is found in Colombia and Venezuela.

== Taxonomy and systematics ==
The golden-breasted fruiteater was originally described as Ampelis aureo-pectus. In the 1970s at least one author treated the golden-breasted fruiteater, black-chested fruiteater (P. lubomirskii), orange-breasted fruiteater (P. jucunda), and masked fruiteater (P. pulchra) as conspecific, but retracted that treatment about a decade later. The four are now considered a superspecies.

The golden-breasted fruiteater has three subspecies, the nominate P. a. aureopectus (Lafresnaye, 1843), P. a. decora (Bangs, 1899), and P. a. festiva (Todd, 1912). Some authors have suggested that the population of the nominate in western Colombia could be separated as a fourth subspecies.

== Description ==
The golden-breasted fruiteater is 16.5 to 17.5 cm (6.5 to 6.9 in) long; three individuals weighed 46 to 50 g (1.6 to 1.8 oz). The sexes have very different plumage. Adult males of the nominate subspecies have dusky lores and chin on an otherwise grass-green head. Their upperparts and tail are also grass-green. Their wings have small white tips on the tertials. Their throat and the middle of their breast are bright yellow. Their lower breast is lemon-yellow that blends to green on the sides and flanks. Adult nominate females have the same head, upperparts, tail, and wings as males. Their underparts are green with yellow streaks. Both sexes have an orange-yellow iris, an orange or orange-red bill, and greenish gray legs and feet. Subspecies P. a. decora is smaller than the nominate and has a yellow band on the sides of its neck. Males of P. a. festiva have more yellow on their underparts than the nominate.

== Distribution and habitat ==
The golden-breasted fruiteater has a disjunct distribution. The nominate subspecies is the most widespread, though found in three discrete populations. It is found on the west slope of Colombia's western Andes, from the northern central Andes of Colombia into the Andes of Venezuela east to Lara, and in the Serranía del Perijá that straddles the Colombia-Venezuela border. Subspecies P. a. decora is found in the isolated Sierra Nevada de Santa Marta of northern Colombia. P. a. festiva is found in the western Venezuelan Coastal Range of Carabobo and Aragua. The species inhabits humid, though not extremely wet, forest in the pre-montane and montane zones. In elevation it is found between 600 and 2,500 m (2,000 and 8,200 ft) in Colombia, between 800 and 2,050 m (2,600 and 6,700 ft) in the Venezuelan Andes, between 1,700 and 3,100 m (5,600 and 10,200 ft) on the Venezuelan side of the Serranía del Perijá, and between 800 and 2,050 m (2,600 and 6,700 ft) in the Venezuelan coastal mountains.

== Behavior ==
=== Movement ===
The golden-breasted fruiteater is a year-round resident.

=== Feeding ===
The golden-breasted fruiteater is believed to feed only on fruit but details are lacking. It typically forages in pairs, mostly in the forest's mid-levels, and often joins mixed-species feeding flocks.

=== Breeding ===
The only data on the golden-breasted fruiteater's breeding biology come from northern Colombia, where the breeding season appears to span from January to June and possibly also includes September.

=== Vocalization ===
The golden-breasted fruiteater's song lasts about three seconds. It is "a high, sibiliant pseEEEeeeeeeeeaaaeeeEET tic! tic!" that rises quickly, slowly descends, and ascends at the end. It sometimes makes a shorter version, "seeeeeEEE!".

== Status ==
The IUCN has assessed the golden-breasted fruiteater as being of Least Concern. It has a restricted range; its population size is not known and is believed to be decreasing. No immediate threats have been identified. It is considered rare in Colombia and fairly common in Venezuela. It occurs in national parks in both countries.
