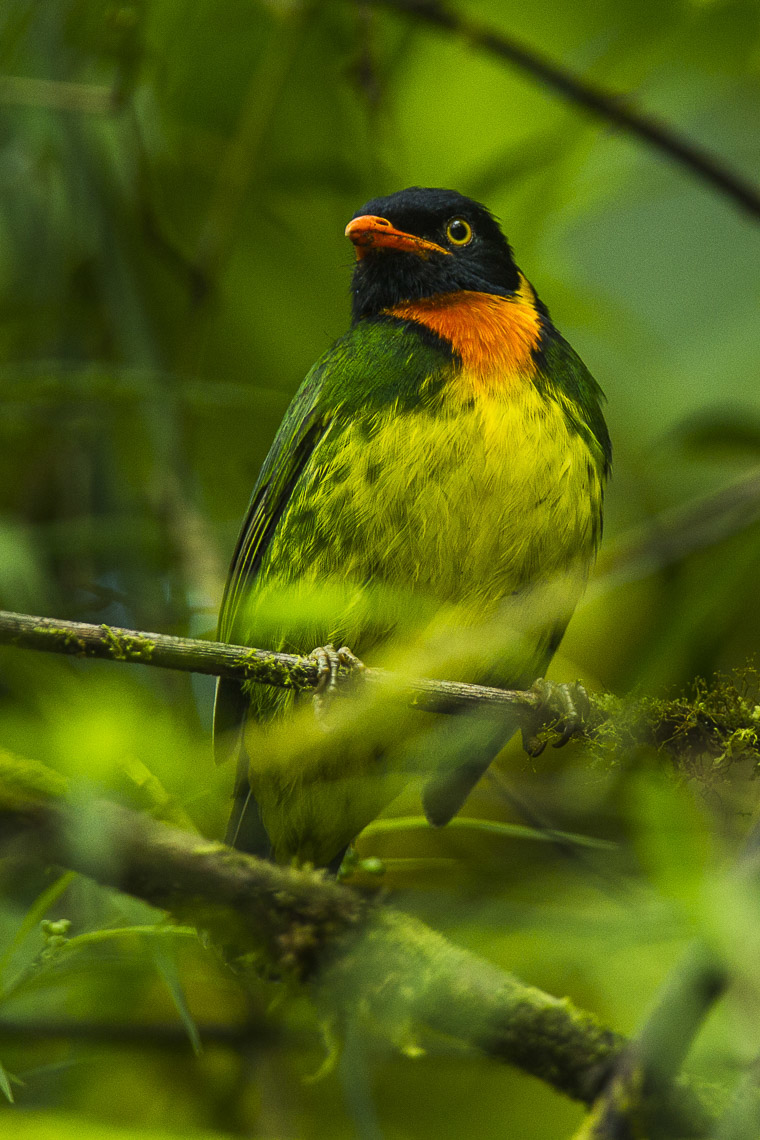

Conservation status
- Least Concern (IUCN 3.1)

Scientific classification
- Kingdom: Animalia
- Phylum: Chordata
- Class: Aves
- Order: Passeriformes
- Family: Cotingidae
- Genus: Pipreola
- Species: P. jucunda

Binomial name
- Pipreola jucunda Sclater, PL, 1860

Synonyms
- Euchlornis jucunda

= Orange-breasted fruiteater =

Species of bird

The orange-breasted fruiteater (Pipreola jucunda) is a species of bird in the family Cotingidae native to Colombia and Ecuador. Its natural habitat is subtropical or tropical moist montane forests. It is a plump green bird about 18 centimetres (7 in) long. Males have a glossy black head and bib, an orange throat and yellow belly. Females lack the dark head and have green upper parts and green and yellow streaked underparts. Both sexes have orange beaks and greyish-green legs. This is a relatively common species with a wide range, and the International Union for Conservation of Nature has rated its conservation status as being of "least concern".

== Description ==
The male orange-breasted fruiteater has a glossy black head and throat and green upper parts. The breast is bright orange and the belly yellow with green mottling at the side. The female is similar in appearance to the female masked fruiteater with green upper parts and green and yellow streaked underparts. Both sexes have yellow eyes, orange bill and greyish-green legs. This bird grows to a length of about 18 centimetres (7 in). The song is similar to that of the black-chested fruiteater, a high-pitched ascending "pseeeeeweet".

== Distribution and habitat ==
This species is native to the foothills and slopes of the western side of the Andes in South America. Its range extends from southwestern Colombia to southwestern Ecuador, mainly between the altitudes of 600 and 1,900 metres (2,000 and 6,200 ft) above sea level. This fruiteater is usually found in the understorey of dense, wet, mossy forests.

== Ecology ==
The orange-breasted fruiteater is sometimes seen in small flocks with other species. It feeds largely on fruit which it either eats while perching on a branch or while hovering rather clumsily. Cup-shaped nests have been found about 5 metres (16 ft) above the ground but little is known of this bird's breeding habits.

== Status ==
The International Union for Conservation of Nature rates the orange-breasted fruiteater as being of "least concern", on the grounds that the bird has a reasonably-large range and is fairly common within that range, and its population seems to be steady.
