= Phryganopteryx rothschildi =

Scientific classification
- Kingdom: Animalia
- Phylum: Arthropoda
- Clade: Pancrustacea
- Class: Insecta
- Order: Lepidoptera
- Superfamily: Noctuoidea
- Family: Erebidae
- Subfamily: Arctiinae
- Genus: Phryganopteryx
- Species: P. rothschildi

Binomial name
- Phryganopteryx rothschildi Toulgoët, 1958

Species of moth

Phryganopteryx rothschildi is a moth in the subfamily Arctiinae. It was described by Hervé de Toulgoët in 1958. It is found on Madagascar.

== Subspecies ==
- Phryganopteryx rothschildi rothschildi
- Phryganopteryx rothschildi colorata Toulgoët, 1971
