= Phryganopteryx postexcisa =

Scientific classification
- Kingdom: Animalia
- Phylum: Arthropoda
- Clade: Pancrustacea
- Class: Insecta
- Order: Lepidoptera
- Superfamily: Noctuoidea
- Family: Erebidae
- Subfamily: Arctiinae
- Genus: Phryganopteryx
- Species: P. postexcisa

Binomial name
- Phryganopteryx postexcisa Rothschild, 1935

Species of moth

Phryganopteryx postexcisa is a moth in the subfamily Arctiinae. It was described by Rothschild in 1935. It is found in Madagascar.
