= Phryganopteryx saalmuelleri =

Scientific classification
- Kingdom: Animalia
- Phylum: Arthropoda
- Clade: Pancrustacea
- Class: Insecta
- Order: Lepidoptera
- Superfamily: Noctuoidea
- Family: Erebidae
- Subfamily: Arctiinae
- Genus: Phryganopteryx
- Species: P. saalmuelleri

Binomial name
- Phryganopteryx saalmuelleri Rothschild, 1924

Species of moth

Phryganopteryx saalmuelleri is a moth in the subfamily Arctiinae. It was described by Rothschild in 1924. It is found in Madagascar.
