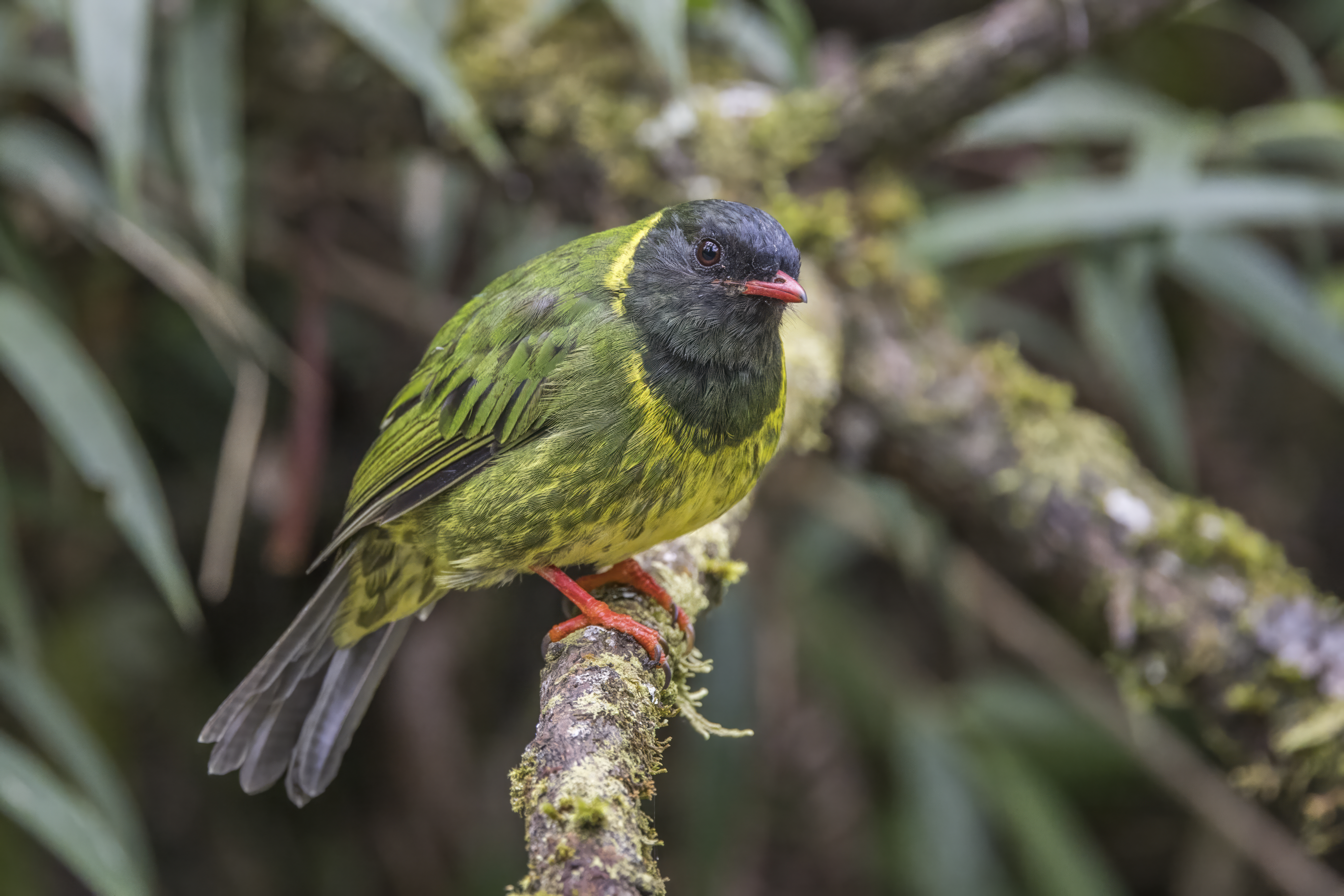
- Green-and-black fruiteater (P.riefferii)

Scientific classification
- Kingdom: Animalia
- Phylum: Chordata
- Class: Aves
- Order: Passeriformes
- Family: Cotingidae
- Genus: Pipreola; Swainson, 1838

Type species
- Pipreola chlorolepidota (fiery-throated fruiteater) Swainson, 1838

= Pipreola =

Genus of birds

Pipreola is a genus of bird in the family Cotingidae. Together with Ampelioides tschudii, they are collectively known as fruiteaters. All are restricted to humid montane or foothill forest in western or northern South America. They are thickset birds with predominantly greenish upperparts. Males of most species have black heads and/or reddish, orange or yellow to the throat, chest or belly.

== Taxonomy ==
The genus Pipreola was introduced in 1838 by the English naturalist William Swainson to accommodate a single species, the fiery-throated fruiteater. The genus name is a Latin diminutive of the genus Pipra that was introduced in 1764 by Carl Linnaeus.

The genus now contains 11 species:

Image	Scientific name	Common name	Distribution
	Pipreola arcuata	Barred fruiteater	Venezuela, Colombia and Ecuador to Peru and Bolivia
	Pipreola aureopectus	Golden-breasted fruiteater	Colombia, and Venezuela
	Pipreola chlorolepidota	Fiery-throated fruiteater	Colombia, Ecuador, and Peru
	Pipreola formosa	Handsome fruiteater	northern Venezuela
	Pipreola frontalis	Scarlet-breasted fruiteater	Bolivia, Ecuador, and Peru
	Pipreola intermedia	Band-tailed fruiteater	Bolivia and Peru
	Pipreola jucunda	Orange-breasted fruiteater	Colombia and Ecuador
	Pipreola lubomirskii	Black-chested fruiteater	Colombia, Ecuador, and Peru
	Pipreola pulchra	Masked fruiteater	Peru
	Pipreola riefferii	Green-and-black fruiteater	Colombia, Ecuador, Peru, and Venezuela
	Pipreola whitelyi	Red-banded fruiteater	Venezuela, western Guyana, and extreme north Brazil
