= Phryganopteryx strigilata =

Scientific classification
- Kingdom: Animalia
- Phylum: Arthropoda
- Clade: Pancrustacea
- Class: Insecta
- Order: Lepidoptera
- Superfamily: Noctuoidea
- Family: Erebidae
- Subfamily: Arctiinae
- Genus: Phryganopteryx
- Species: P. strigilata

Binomial name
- Phryganopteryx strigilata (Saalmüller, 1878)

Synonyms
- Macrobrochis strigillata Saalmüller, 1878; Phryganopteryx feminina Rothschild, 1924

Species of moth

Phryganopteryx strigilata is a moth in the subfamily Arctiinae. It was described by Saalmüller in 1878. It is found in Madagascar.
