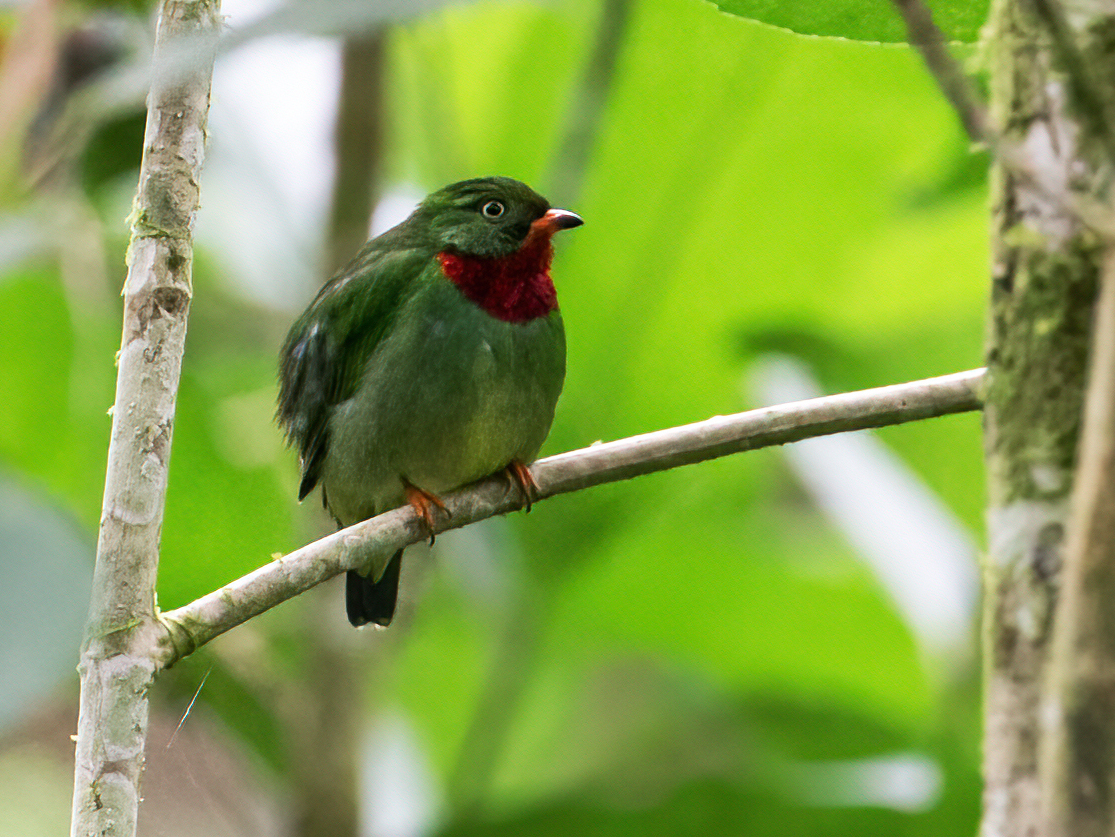

Conservation status
- Least Concern (IUCN 3.1)

Scientific classification
- Kingdom: Animalia
- Phylum: Chordata
- Class: Aves
- Order: Passeriformes
- Family: Cotingidae
- Genus: Pipreola
- Species: P. chlorolepidota

Binomial name
- Pipreola chlorolepidota Swainson, 1838

= Fiery-throated fruiteater =

Species of bird

The fiery-throated fruiteater (Pipreola chlorolepidota) is a species of bird in the family Cotingidae. It is found in Colombia, Ecuador, and Peru where its natural habitats are subtropical or tropical moist lowland forests and subtropical or tropical moist montane forests. It is becoming rare due to habitat destruction of its rainforest habitat.

== Description ==
At just 12.5 cm (5 in), the fiery-throated fruiteater is the smallest species in the genus. The adult male has a bright green head and upper parts except for the tips of the tertial wing feathers which are white. The throat and chest are bright orangish-red, contrasting with the rest of the underparts which are green, the midbelly being tinged with yellow. The upper parts of the adult female are similar to those of the male, the breast is green and the belly is barred with green and yellow. In both sexes, the iris is pale grey, the beak pinkish-orange with a dark tip, and the legs orange. This bird might be confused with the scarlet-breasted fruiteater (Pipreola frontalis) but that species is larger and the belly of the male is less green.

== Distribution and habitat ==
The fiery-throated fruiteater is found in humid tropical forests on the eastern slopes of the Andes. Its range extends from southern Colombia, through Ecuador to northern Peru, and its altitudinal range is from 600 to 1,200 metres (2,000 to 3,900 ft) above sea level, although it has been observed at Cerros del Sira, in the Ucayali Region of Peru, at around 1,500 metres (4,900 ft).

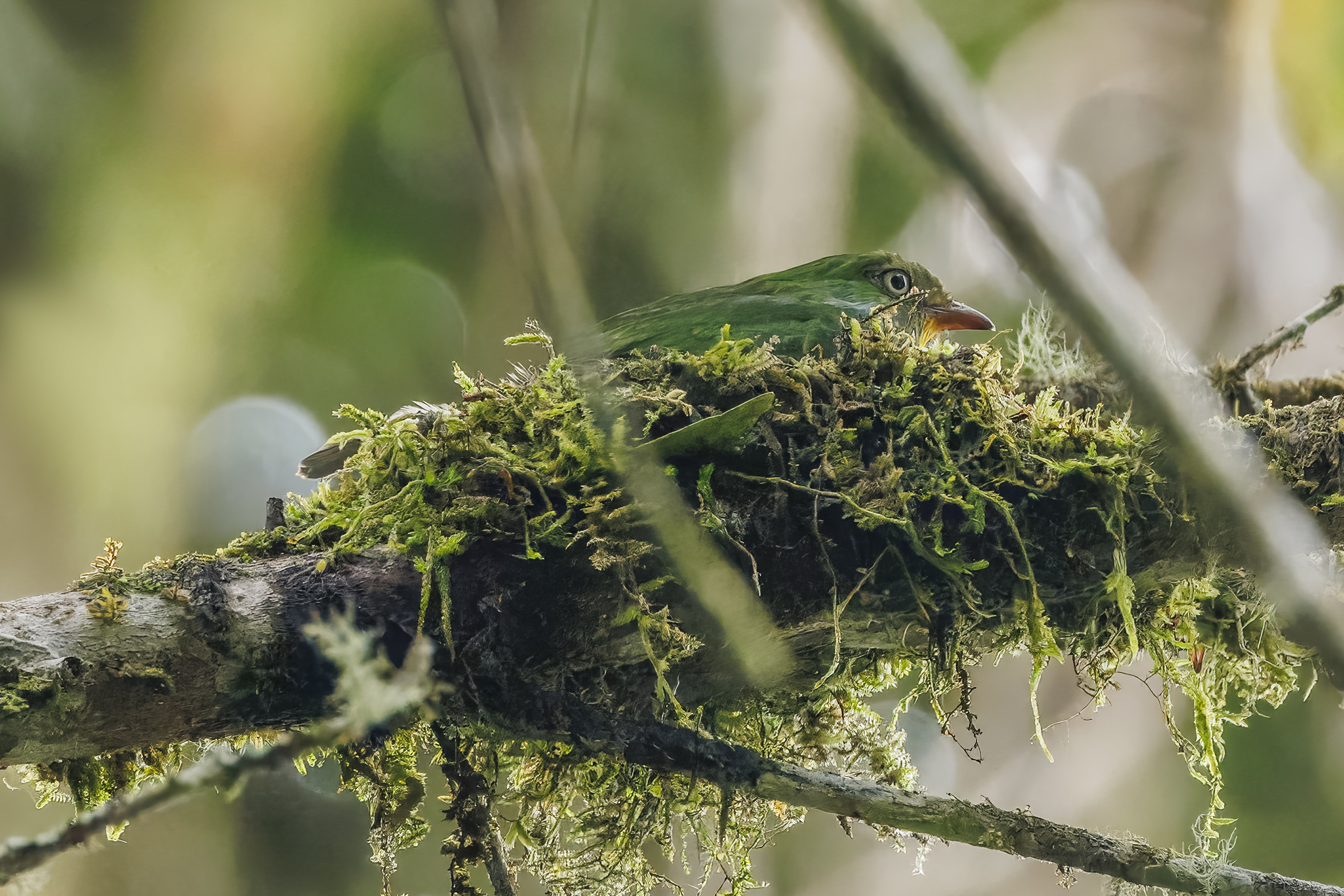
female on nest, Ecuador

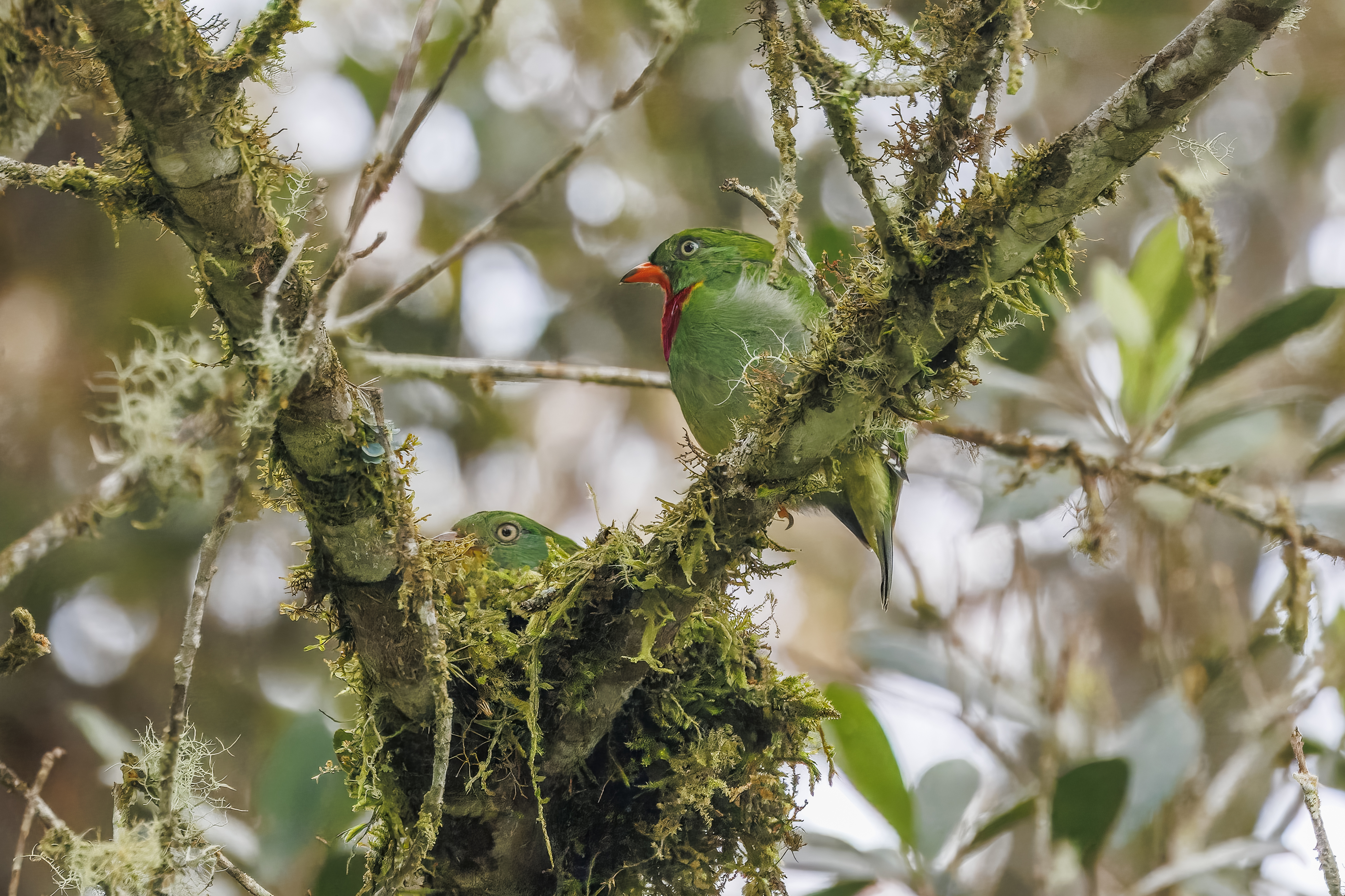
female on same nest with male

== Status ==
The forests on the foothills of the Andes in Colombia, Ecuador and Peru are under pressure from tea and coffee farmers, cattle ranchers, loggers, miners and oil explorers. The fiery-throated fruiteater is an uncommon species with a patchy distribution across its wide range. Through much of its range its population trend is thought to be downwards, but it is present in the Sangay National Park in Ecuador where the natural forest should be preserved so the international Union for Conservation of Nature has rated it as being a least concern.
