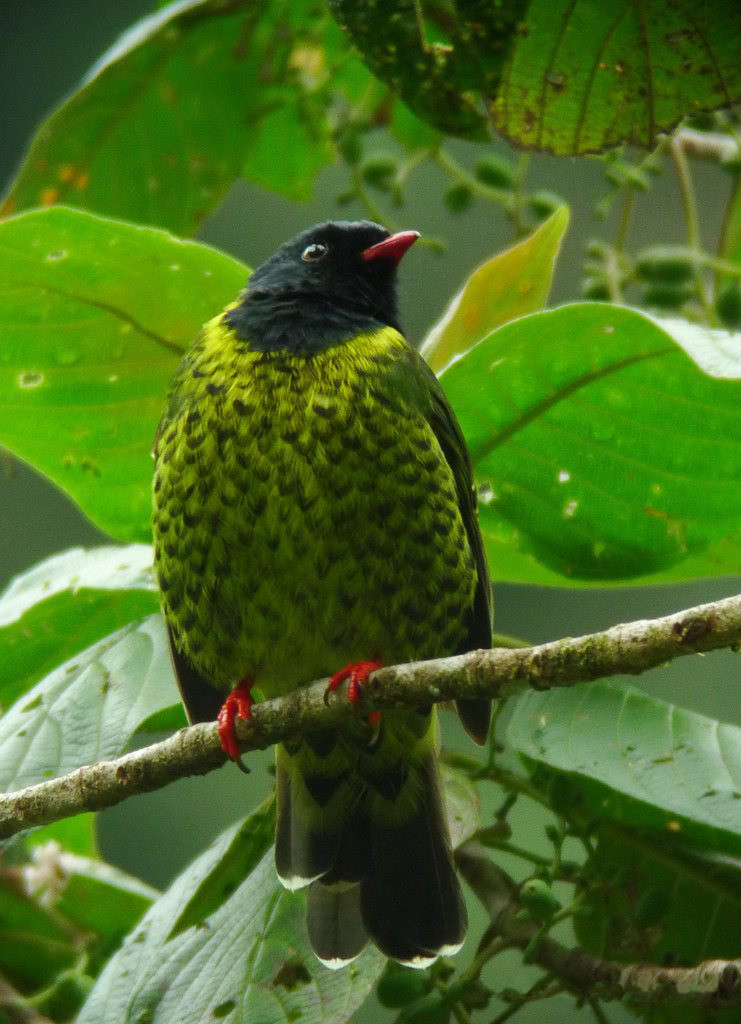
- Male

Conservation status
- Least Concern (IUCN 3.1)

Scientific classification
- Kingdom: Animalia
- Phylum: Chordata
- Class: Aves
- Order: Passeriformes
- Family: Cotingidae
- Genus: Pipreola
- Species: P. intermedia

Binomial name
- Pipreola intermedia Taczanowski, 1884

= Band-tailed fruiteater =

Species of bird

The band-tailed fruiteater (Pipreola intermedia) is a species of bird in the family Cotingidae, the cotingas. It is found in Bolivia and Peru.

== Taxonomy and systematics ==
The band-tailed fruiteater was originally described as Pipreola viridis intermedia, a subspecies of the green-and-black fruiteater (later P. riefferii). Since the early twentieth century it has been treated as a full species.

The band-tailed fruiteater has two subspecies, the nominate P. i. intermedia (Taczanowski, 1884) and P. i. signata (Carl Eduard Hellmayr, 1917).

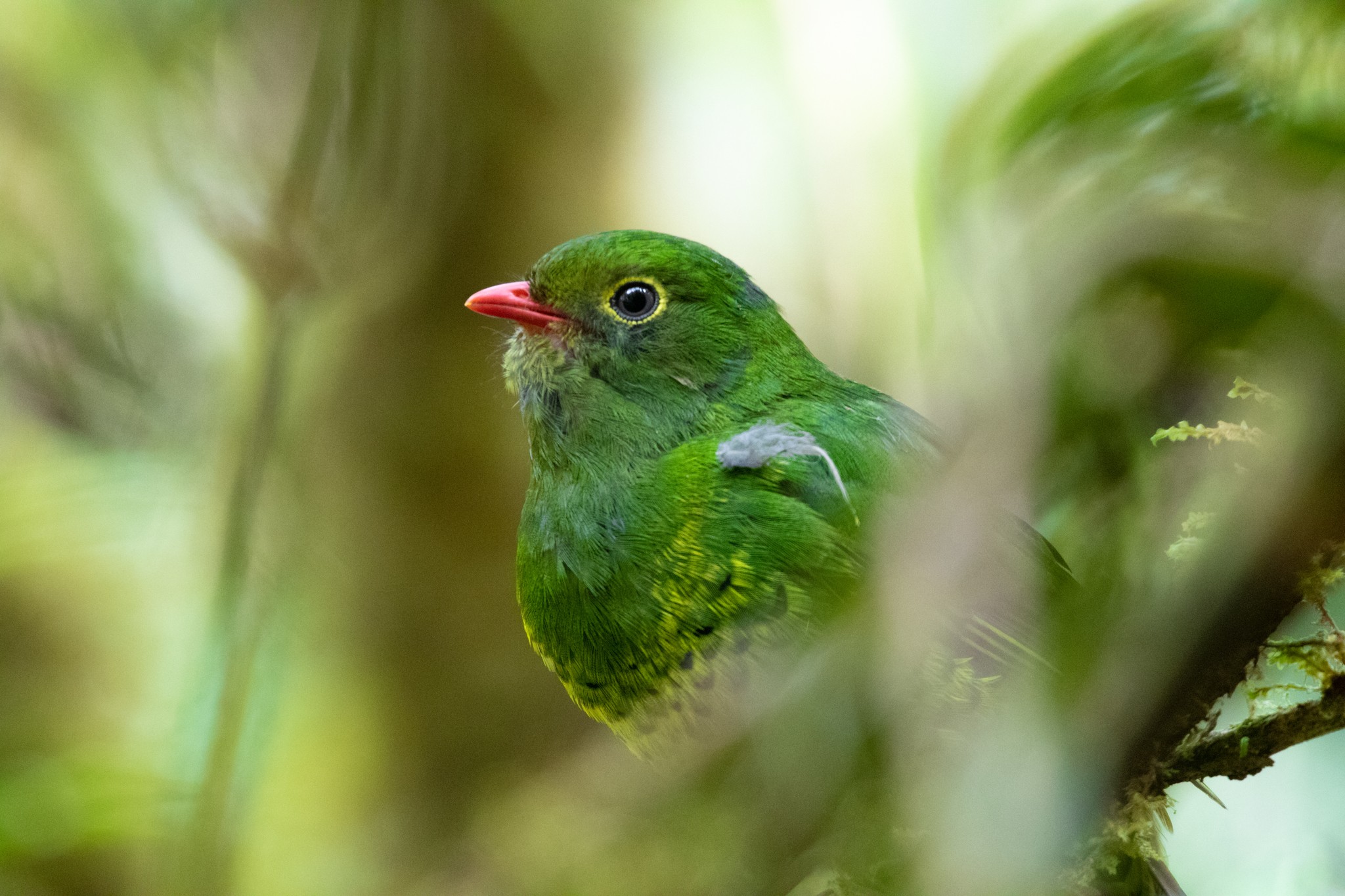
Female

== Description ==
The band-tailed fruiteater is 18.5 to 19.5 cm (7.3 to 7.7 in) long and weighs 44 to 59 g (1.6 to 2.1 oz). The sexes have different plumage. Adult males of the nominate subspecies have an entirely black head and upper breast with a thin yellow band ("collar") around its base except on the nape. Their upperparts are green and the wings and tail mostly that color. The wing's tertials have white tips. The tail has a black bar near the end and white tips on the feathers. Their underparts are yellow with black scallops. Their flanks are green and also have black scallops. Females have a green head instead of the male's black, little or no yellow collar, and less black scalloping on the underparts. They have a yellow eye-ring. Both sexes have a brown iris, a crimson bill with sometimes a black culmen, and red or orange-red legs and feet. Subspecies P. i. signata has a much bolder yellow collar than the nominate and brighter yellow, mostly unmarked, underparts. The band-tailed fruiteater is very similar to the green-and-black fruiteater with whose range it overlaps, but that species is smaller and does not have the black tail band.

== Distribution and habitat ==
The nominate subspecies of the band-tailed fruiteater is the more northerly of the two. It is found along the eastern slope of the Andes of Peru from La Libertad and San Martín departments south to Junín Department. Subspecies P. i. signata is found along the eastern slope from Cuzco and Puno departments in Peru south into Bolivia's La Paz and Cochabamba departments. It inhabits the interior and edges of montane forest in the temperate zone. In elevation it ranges mostly between 2,100 and 3,000 m (6,900 and 9,800 ft) in Peru but down to 1,500 m (4,900 ft) in the south. In Bolivia it ranges between 1,100 and 2,800 m (3,600 and 9,200 ft).

== Behavior ==
=== Movement ===
The band-tailed fruiteater is a year-round resident, though some elevational movement is suspected in Biolivia.

=== Feeding ===
The band-tailed fruiteater is believed to feed only on fruit but details are lacking.

=== Breeding ===
Nothing is known about the band-tailed fruiteater's breeding biology.

=== Vocalization ===
The band-tailed fruiteater's song is "a series of very high notes followed by [a] thin, descending whistle, ti-ti-ti teeeeeeew" and its call "a series of high ti or tswee notes".

== Status ==
The IUCN has assessed the band-tailed fruiteater as being of Least Concern. It has large range; its population size is not known and is believed to be decreasing. No immediate threats have been identified. It is considered "fairly common and widespread" in Peru. It occurs in at least one national park in each of Peru and Bolivia.
