= Phryganopteryx perineti =

Scientific classification
- Kingdom: Animalia
- Phylum: Arthropoda
- Clade: Pancrustacea
- Class: Insecta
- Order: Lepidoptera
- Superfamily: Noctuoidea
- Family: Erebidae
- Subfamily: Arctiinae
- Genus: Phryganopteryx
- Species: P. perineti

Binomial name
- Phryganopteryx perineti Rothschild, 1933

Species of moth

Phryganopteryx perineti is a moth in the subfamily Arctiinae. It was described by Rothschild in 1933. It is found in Madagascar.
