= Phryganopteryx =

Scientific classification
- Kingdom: Animalia
- Phylum: Arthropoda
- Clade: Pancrustacea
- Class: Insecta
- Order: Lepidoptera
- Superfamily: Noctuoidea
- Family: Erebidae
- Subfamily: Arctiinae
- Tribe: Lithosiini
- Subtribe: Phryganopterygina
- Genus: Phryganopteryx; Saalmüller, 1884

Synonyms
- Paraphrygia Hampson, 1920; Maxia Kirby, 1892

Genus of moths

Phryganopteryx is a genus of Madagascan moths in the monotypic subtribe Phryganopterygina of the family Erebidae. The genus was erected by Max Saalmüller in 1884. The type species of this genus is Phryganopteryx strigilata Saalmüller, 1878.

== Species ==
- Phryganopteryx convergens Toulgoët, 1958
- Phryganopteryx formosa Toulgoët, 1958
- Phryganopteryx griveaudi Toulgoët, 1958
- Phryganopteryx incerta Toulgoët, 1972
- Phryganopteryx inexpectata Rothschild, 1931
- Phryganopteryx intermedia Toulgoët, 1965
- Phryganopteryx lemairei Toulgoët, 1973
- Phryganopteryx nebulosa Toulgoët, 1958
- Phryganopteryx occidentalis Toulgoët, 1958
- Phryganopteryx pauliani Toulgoët, 1971
- Phryganopteryx perineti Rothschild, 1933
- Phryganopteryx postexcisa Rothschild, 1935
- Phryganopteryx rectangulata Kenrick, 1914
- Phryganopteryx rothschildi Toulgoët, 1958
- Phryganopteryx saalmuelleri Rothschild, 1924
- Phryganopteryx sogai Toulgoët, 1958
- Phryganopteryx strigilata Saalmüller, 1878
- Phryganopteryx triangularis Toulgoët, 1958
- Phryganopteryx viettei Toulgoët, 1961
- Phryganopteryx watsoni Toulgoët, 1977
