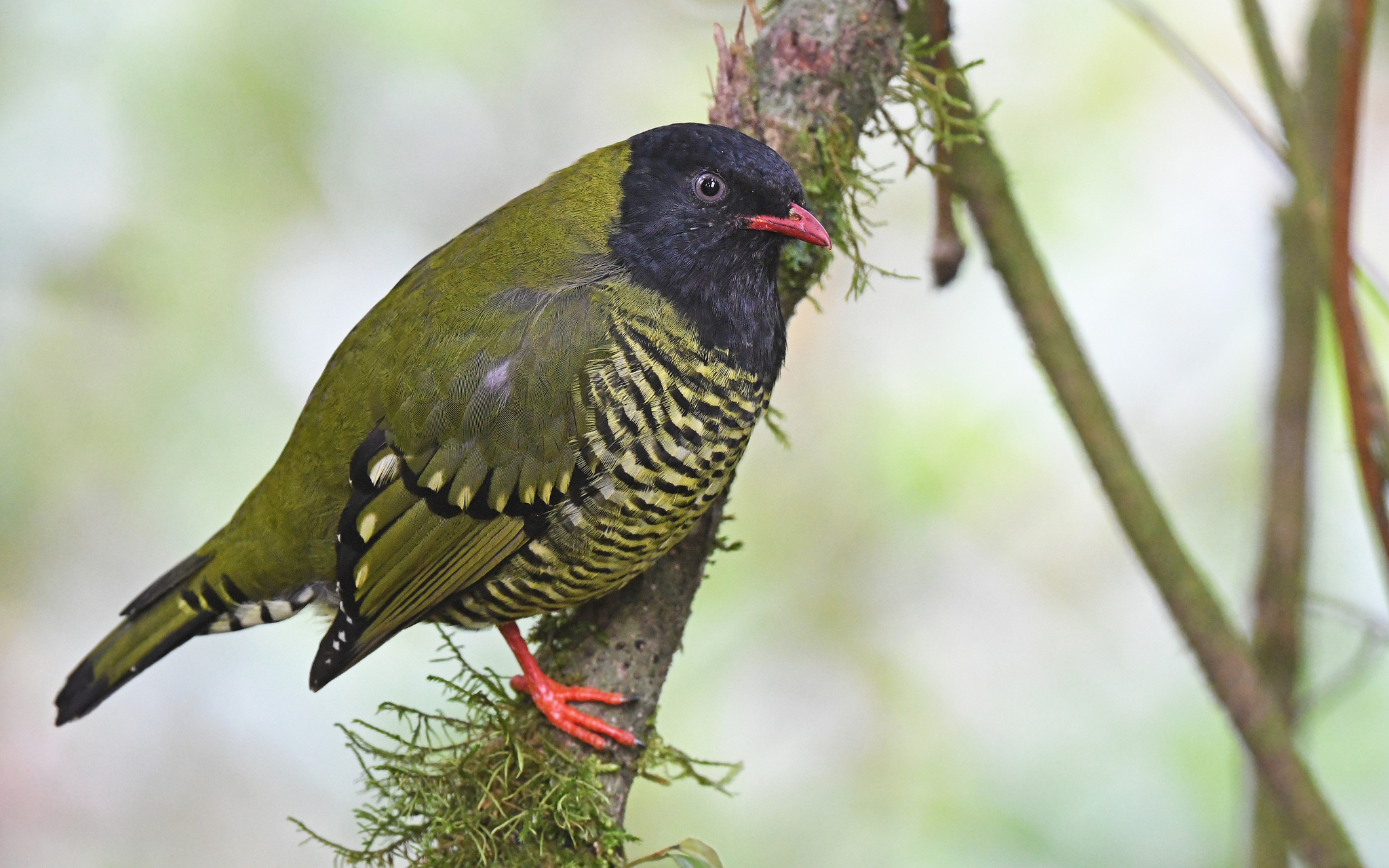

Conservation status
- Least Concern (IUCN 3.1)

Scientific classification
- Kingdom: Animalia
- Phylum: Chordata
- Class: Aves
- Order: Passeriformes
- Family: Cotingidae
- Genus: Pipreola
- Species: P. arcuata

Binomial name
- Pipreola arcuata (Lafresnaye, 1843)

Audio
- Song of the barred fruiteater

= Barred fruiteater =

Species of bird

The barred fruiteater (Pipreola arcuata) is a species of bird in the family Cotingidae, the cotingas. It is found in Bolivia, Colombia, Ecuador, Peru, and Venezuela.

== Taxonomy and systematics ==
The barred fruiteater was originally described as Ampelis arcuata.

The barred fruiteater has two subspecies, the nominate P. a. arcuata (Lafresnaye, 1843) and P. a. viridicauda (Meyer de Schauensee, 1953).

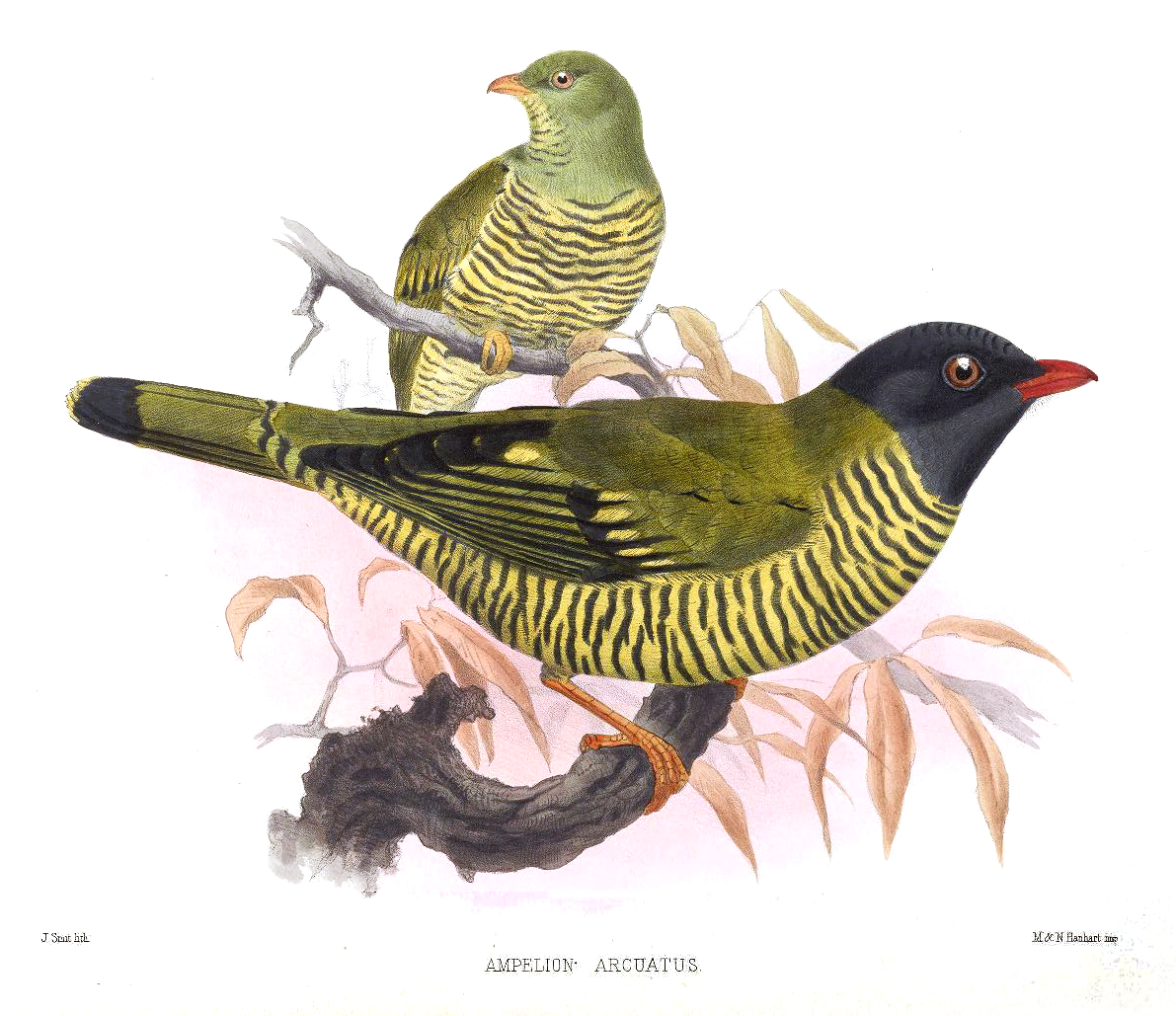
Illustration by Joseph Smit

== Description ==
The barred fruiteater is among the largest of its genus at 22 to 23 cm (8.7 to 9.1 in) long and weighing 112 to 128 g (4.0 to 4.5 oz). The sexes have different plumage, though uniquely among the fruiteaters both have barred breasts. Adult males of the nominate subspecies have an entirely black head, neck, and upper breast. Their upperparts are olive-green and the wings and tail mostly that color. The wing's greater coverts and tertials have large yellow spots. The tail has a black bar near the end and whitish tips on the feathers. Their underparts are yellow with crisp black bars. Females have an olive-green head instead of the male's black and the black-barred yellow of the underparts includes the throat and upper breast. Both sexes have a red, orange, yellow, or chestnut iris, a crimson bill with sometimes a black tip, and scarlet legs and feet. Subspecies P. a. viridicauda has pale yellow to creamy eyes and less black and white on its outer tail feathers than the nominate.

== Distribution and habitat ==
The barred fruiteater has a disjunct distribution. The nominate subspecies has the much larger range, though it is discontinuous. It is found in the Serranía del Perijá that straddles the Colombia-Venezuela border, in the Andes of Venezuela from Lara west into Colombia's eastern Andes, from Colombia's central and western Andes south through the Andes of Ecuador into far northern Peru's Piura Department, and on the eastern slope of the Andes of Peru from Amazonas south to Pasco Department. Subspecies P. a. viridicauda is found on the eastern slope of the Andes from Junín Department in Peru south into Bolivia's La Paz and Cochabamba departments.

The barred fruiteater inhabits the interior and edges of montane forest, including cloudforest, in the temperate zone. In elevation it ranges between 1,800 and 3,100 m (5,900 and 10,200 ft) in Venezuela, between 2,000 and 3,400 m (6,600 and 11,200 ft) in Colombia, mostly between 2,500 and 3,300 m (8,200 and 10,800 ft) in Ecuador, and between 2,100 and 3,500 m (6,900 and 11,500 ft) in Peru.

== Behavior ==
=== Movement ===
The barred fruiteater is a year-round resident.

=== Feeding ===
The barred fruiteater is believed to feed only on fruit but details are lacking. It forages singly, in pairs, or in small groups, mostly in the forest's mid-levels and up, and seldom joins mixed-species feeding flocks. It tends to sit sluggishly for long periods.

=== Breeding ===
Fledgling barred fruiteaters have been seen in Bolivia in January and in Ecuador in June. Nothing else is known about the species' breeding biology.

=== Vocalization ===
The barred fruiteater's song has been described as "a very high, thin, rising whistle, then a descending whistle, often several rising or descending whistles in [a] loose series". Its calls are described as "shorter descending, or slightly rising then descending, whistles" and a "series of very high ti or tseee notes".

== Status ==
The IUCN has assessed the barred fruiteater as being of Least Concern. It has a very large overall range of about 3,160,000 km^{2} (1,220,000 mi^{2}) though its actual area of occupancy is not known. Its population size is not known and is believed to be decreasing. No immediate threats have been identified. It is considered uncommon overall, uncommon in Venezuela, and rare in Colombia. It occurs in several national parks.
