= Phryganopteryx rectangulata =

Scientific classification
- Kingdom: Animalia
- Phylum: Arthropoda
- Clade: Pancrustacea
- Class: Insecta
- Order: Lepidoptera
- Superfamily: Noctuoidea
- Family: Erebidae
- Subfamily: Arctiinae
- Genus: Phryganopteryx
- Species: P. rectangulata

Binomial name
- Phryganopteryx rectangulata Kenrick, 1914

Species of moth

Phryganopteryx rectangulata is a moth in the subfamily Arctiinae. It was described by George Hamilton Kenrick in 1914. It is found on Madagascar.
