= Phryganopteryx inexpectata =

Scientific classification
- Kingdom: Animalia
- Phylum: Arthropoda
- Clade: Pancrustacea
- Class: Insecta
- Order: Lepidoptera
- Superfamily: Noctuoidea
- Family: Erebidae
- Subfamily: Arctiinae
- Genus: Phryganopteryx
- Species: P. inexpectata

Binomial name
- Phryganopteryx inexpectata Rothschild, 1931

Species of moth

Phryganopteryx inexpectata is a moth in the subfamily Arctiinae. It was described by Rothschild in 1931. It is found in Madagascar.
