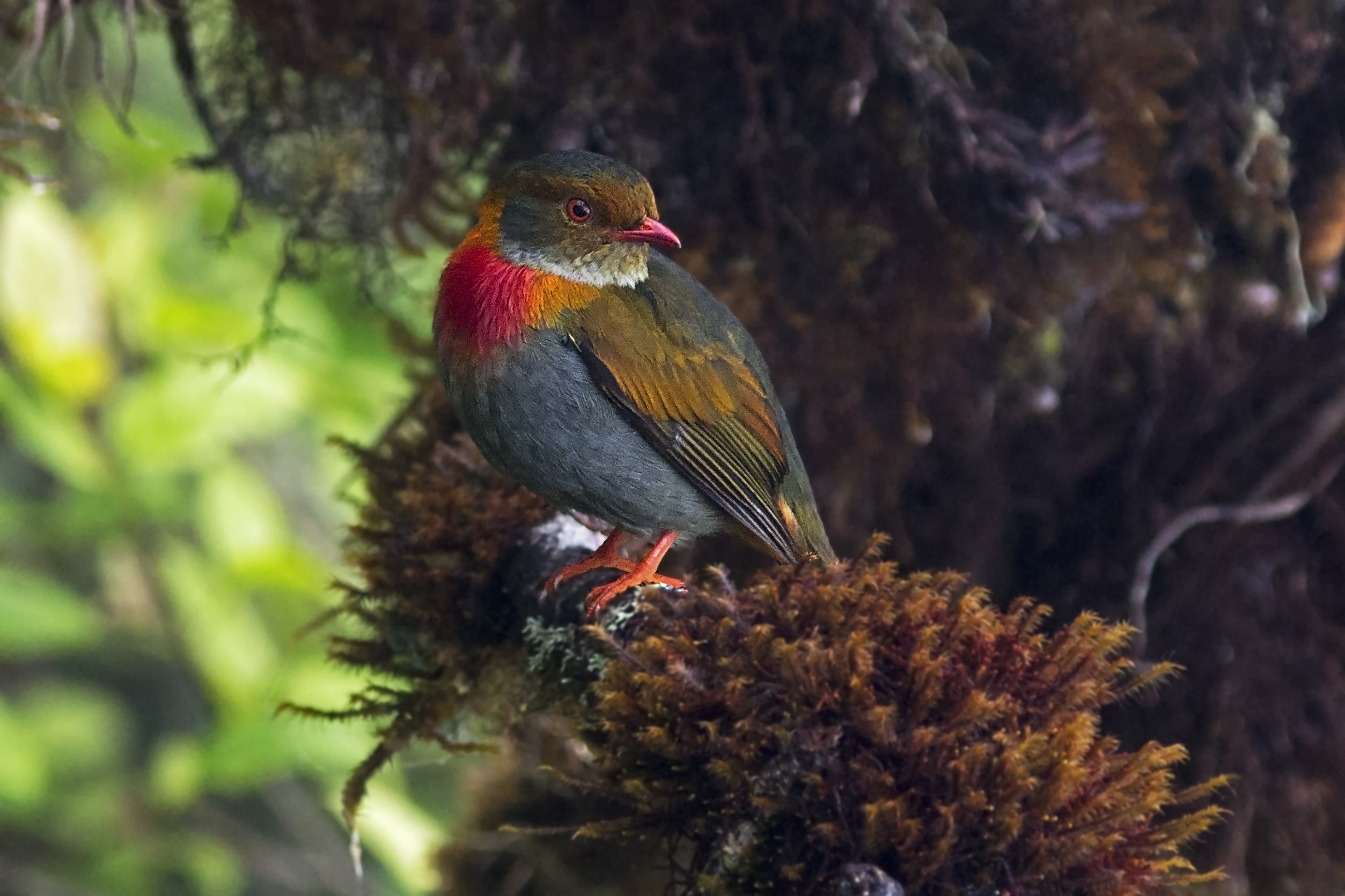

Conservation status
- Least Concern (IUCN 3.1)

Scientific classification
- Kingdom: Animalia
- Phylum: Chordata
- Class: Aves
- Order: Passeriformes
- Family: Cotingidae
- Genus: Pipreola
- Species: P. whitelyi

Binomial name
- Pipreola whitelyi Salvin & Godman, 1884

= Red-banded fruiteater =

Species of bird

The red-banded fruiteater (Pipreola whitelyi) is a species of bird in the family Cotingidae, the cotingas. It is found in Brazil, Guyana, and Venezuela.

== Taxonomy and systematics ==
The red-banded fruiteater has two subspecies, the nominate P. w. whitelyi (Salvin & Godman, 1884) and P. w. kathleenae (Zimmer, JT & Phelps, WH, 1944).

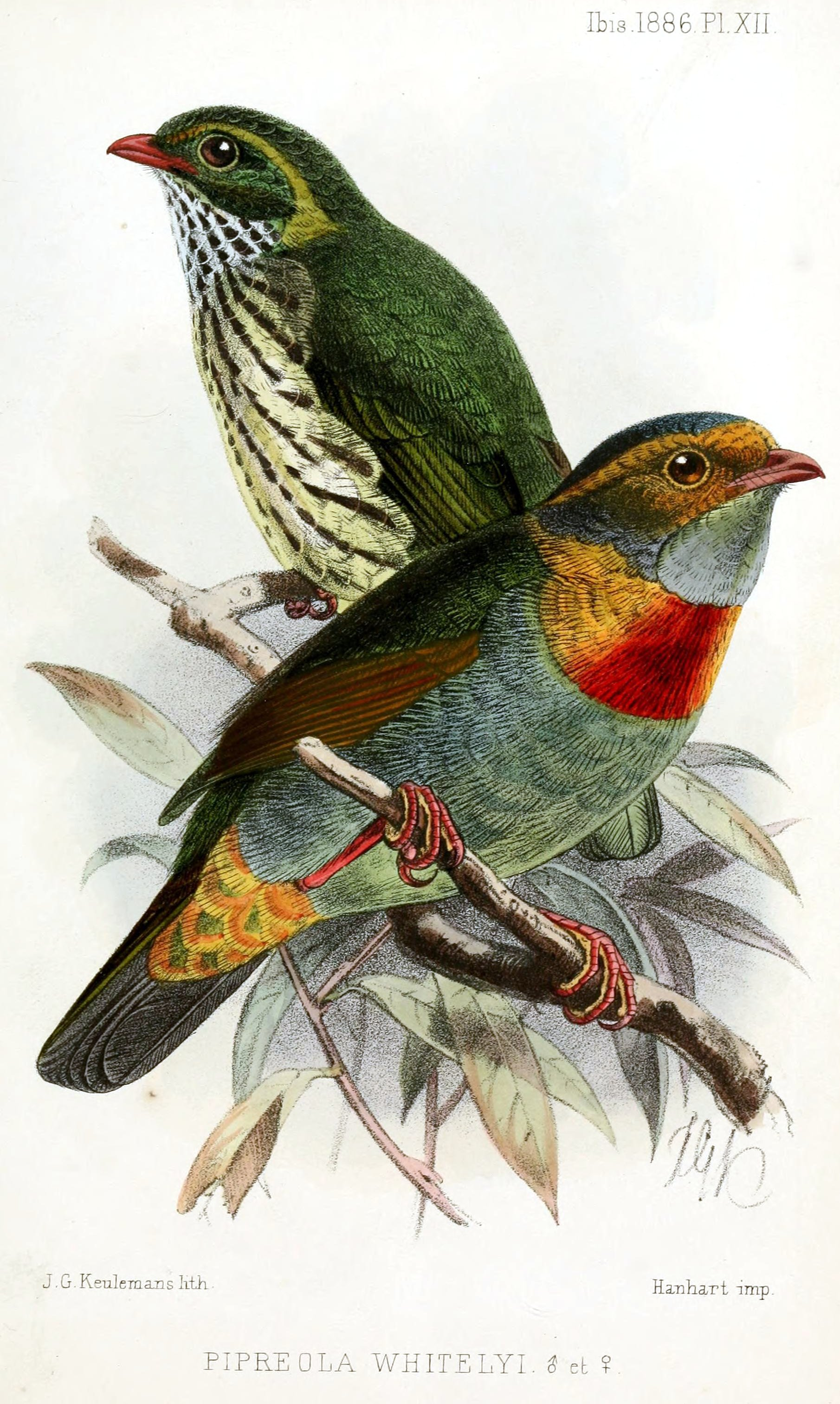
Red-banded fruiteaters

== Description ==
The red-banded fruiteater is the "most distinctive species in genus" Pipreola. It is about 16.5 to 17.5 cm (6.5 to 6.9 in) long. The sexes have very different plumage. Adult males of the nominate subspecies have a tawny-buff to rufous forehead, supercilium, and cheeks on an otherwise dark grayish green head. Their upperparts are also dark grayish green. Their wings and tail are rufous-brown. Their upper breast has a red crescent that becomes tawny on the sides of the neck. The rest of their underparts are mostly gray with ochre undertail coverts. Adult nominate females have a similar but duller grayish green head and upperparts with a paler supercilium and duller rufous-brown wings and tail. Their underparts are yellowish white with blackish streaks. Juveniles of both sexes resemble adult females with heavily spotted upperparts. Adult males have an orange-red iris, a red bill, and red legs and feet. Adult females have a yellowish iris and duller red bill and legs than males. Subspecies P. w. kathleenae is similar to the nominate but with a larger yellowish patch on the male's forehead and blacker stripes on the female's underparts.

== Distribution and habitat ==
The red-banded fruiteater is a bird of the tepui region where eastern Venezuela, western Guyana, and extreme northern Brazil meet. Sources differ on its exact range. The South American Classification Committee of the American Ornithological Society places it in all three countries. The IOC places the nominate subspecies in western Guyana and P. w. kathleenae in southeastern Venezuela without further detail, and with no mention of Brazil. The Clements taxonomy places the nominate on the tepuis of western Guyana (specifically noting Mount Twek-quay) and northern Brazil. It places P. w. kathleenae on the tepuis of southeastern Bolívar state in Venezuela. Hilty's Birds of Venezuela places the nominate on Mount Roraima, which is on the three-country junction, and P. w. kathleenae on multiple tepuis in southeastern Bolívar. Hilty notes its presence in Guyana without detail and does not name Brazil.

The red-banded fruiteater inhabits "humid and wet montane forest", especially dense secondary forest with much moss and an understory of Melastomataceae. In elevation it ranges between 1,300 and 2,100 m (4,300 and 6,900 ft) in Bolívar and between 1,800 and 2,250 m (5,900 and 7,400 ft) on Mount Roraima.

== Behavior ==
=== Movement ===
The red-banded fruiteater is a year-round resident.

=== Feeding ===
The red-banded fruiteater is believed to feed only on fruit but details are lacking. It typically forages singly or in pairs, mostly from the forest's lower to mid-levels, and sometimes joins mixed-species feeding flocks.

=== Breeding ===
Nothing is known about the red-banded fruiteater's breeding biology.

=== Vocalization ===
The red-banded fruiteater seldom vocalizes. Both sexes do have a call, "a high, thin trill (almost a hiss) that drops initially then ascends smoothly throughout, tseeaaaaeeeeeeeeee...lasting 2-3 seconds". When excited, the species also makes a series of about six "high, thin ti notes".

== Status ==
The IUCN has assessed the red-banded fruiteater as being of Least Concern. It has a restricted range; its population size is not known and is believed to be decreasing. No immediate threats have been identified. It is considered "difficult-to-locate [and] low-density". It occurs in at least one Venezuelan national park and "[m]uch of its range is difficult of access, and not at present under threat".
