= Phryganopteryx incerta =

Scientific classification
- Kingdom: Animalia
- Phylum: Arthropoda
- Clade: Pancrustacea
- Class: Insecta
- Order: Lepidoptera
- Superfamily: Noctuoidea
- Family: Erebidae
- Subfamily: Arctiinae
- Genus: Phryganopteryx
- Species: P. incerta

Binomial name
- Phryganopteryx incerta Toulgoët, 1972

Species of moth

Phryganopteryx incerta is a moth in the subfamily Arctiinae. It was described by Hervé de Toulgoët in 1972. It is found on Madagascar.
