= Handsome fruiteater =

Conservation status
- Least Concern (IUCN 3.1)

Scientific classification
- Kingdom: Animalia
- Phylum: Chordata
- Class: Aves
- Order: Passeriformes
- Family: Cotingidae
- Genus: Pipreola
- Species: P. formosa

Binomial name
- Pipreola formosa (Hartlaub, 1849)

Species of bird

The handsome fruiteater (Pipreola formosa) is a species of bird in the family Cotingidae, the cotingas. It is endemic to Venezuela.

== Taxonomy and systematics ==
The handsome fruiteater was first described by the ornithologist Gustav Hartlaub in 1848 with the binomial name Ampelis formosa. The type specimen was originally said to have come from Venezuela, and later was determined to have likely came from Caracas. In 1925 it was placed in the genus Euchlornis as E. formosa before ending up in the genus Pipreola as P. formosa.

The handsome fruiteater has three subspecies, the nominate P. f. formosa (Hartlaub, 1849), P. f. rubidior (Chapman, 1925), and P. f. pariae (Phelps, WH & Phelps, WH Jr, 1949).

== Description ==
The handsome fruiteater is 16 to 18 cm (6.3 to 7.1 in) long and weighs 32.5 to 49 g (1.1 to 1.7 oz). The sexes have very different plumage. Adult males of the nominate subspecies have a glossy bluish black head including the chin and throat. Their nape, upperparts, and tail are bright grass green. Their wings are mostly bright grass green with blackish outer webs on the flight feathers and white tips on the tertials. Their upper breast has a deep orange triangular patch in otherwise mostly bright yellow underparts. Their lower flanks are mottled with bright green and their undertail coverts tinged bright greenish. Adult nominate females have a green to greenish yellow forehead and forecrown and a yellowish green throat on an otherwise green to greenish yellow head. Their upperparts are bright grass green. Their tail is mostly bright grass green with blackish or dusky outer feathers. Their wings' primaries and primary coverts are dusky to blackish with green outer webs and their innermost tertials have rounded or crescent-shaped white tips. Their wings are otherwise bright grass green. Their upper breast has an orange-yellow crescent. Their lower breast is green, their belly and flanks yellow barred with green, and their undertail coverts yellowish. Juveniles of both sexes are overall green. Adults have a brownish yellow iris, surrounded in males by bare black skin and in females by grayish green skin. Juveniles have a darker and duller iris. Adults have a stout curved bill; males' are bright orange or orange-yellow and females' brownish yellow to dull yellow. Juvenile males' bills have a dusky wash and females' are overall dusky. Males usually have brownish legs and feet with a yellow or olive tinge. Females' legs and feet are dark slaty gray.

Adults of subspecies P. f. rubidior have orange-yellow eyes. Males otherwise resemble the nominate. Females have a yellow throat with thin dark green barring and a reddish crescent on the breast. Adult males of subspecies P. f. pariae have orange eyes, adult females yellow eyes, and juveniles brown to orange eyes. Adult males otherwise resemble the nominate; juveniles have an orange throat patch. Adult females have a yellow throat with thin green bars and a scarlet breast patch.

== Distribution and habitat ==
The handsome fruiteater has a disjunct distribution; the three subspecies are found in different parts of the Venezuelan Coastal Range. The nominate subspecies is the westernmost; it is found from Yaracuy and Carabobo east to the Federal District and Miranda with a sight record further west in Falcón. Subspecies P. f. rubidior is found in northeastern Anzoátegui, western Sucre, and northern Monagas. P. f. pariae is found on the Paria Peninsula. The handsome fruiteater inhabits somewhat humid to wet premontane forest and cloudforest. In elevation it ranges between 800 and 2,200 m (2,600 and 7,200 ft).

== Behavior ==
=== Movement ===
The handsome fruiteater is a year-round resident of its native habitat, making it a sedentary species.

=== Feeding ===
The handsome fruiteater feeds primarily on fruit, with known items being Gonzalagunia dicocca, Anthurium cartilagineum, and Melastomataceae fruits. It also includes small insects in its diet. It typically feeds singly, in pairs, or in small family groups. It sometimes joins mixed-species feeding flocks as they pass through its territory but seldom accompanies them further. It typically perches quietly between about 2 and 10 m (7 and 33 ft) above the ground. It picks fruit while perched and while briefly hovering after a short upward sally.

=== Breeding ===
The handsome fruiteater's breeding season has not been fully defined but nesting behavior has been observed between November and June. Nothing else is known about the species' breeding biology.

=== Vocalization ===
The handsome fruiteater sings mostly in the morning, usually from a perch between the forest's mid-level and subcanopy, but is seldom heard. The song of subspecies P. f. rubidior is "a high peeEEEeeeeeee'e'e'e'e" that is louder at the beginning, slows at the end, and is essentially on one pitch. The other subspecies' songs appear to differ only slightly from it. The species also makes a "high, thin pik and a high, thin ti'ti'ti'ti'ti'ti'ti...".

== Status ==
The IUCN has assessed the handsome fruiteater as being of Least Concern. Its population size is not known and is believed to be decreasing. No immediate threats have been identified. It is considered fairly common in all parts of its range. "The main threats include the construction of road infrastructure and telecommunications towers, illegal hunting, timber extraction, forest fires, and other factors given the fragility of [cloudforest] ecosystems. At higher elevations, forests are probably adequately served by protected areas'"
