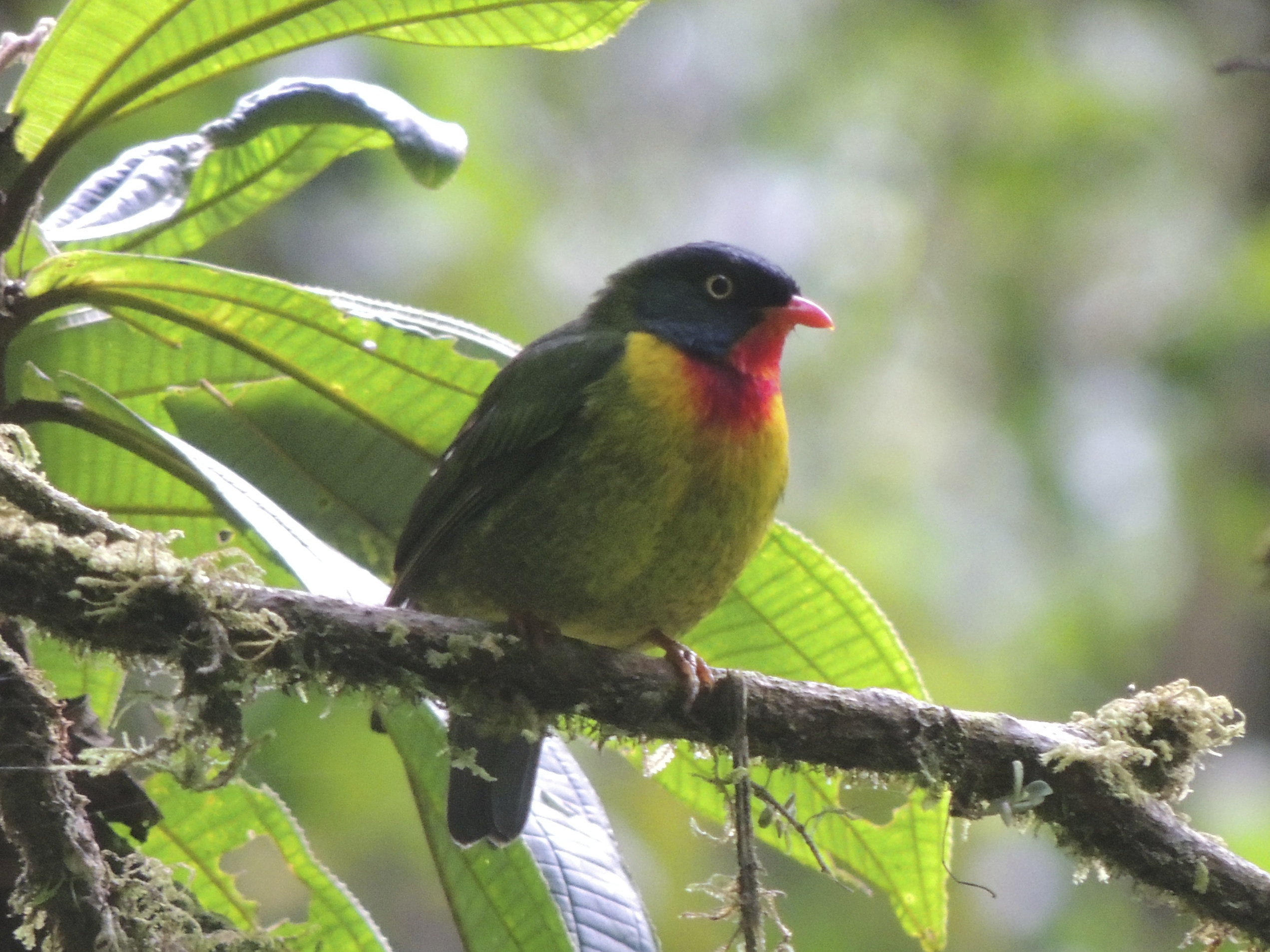
- Male P. f. squamipectus

Conservation status
- Least Concern (IUCN 3.1)

Scientific classification
- Kingdom: Animalia
- Phylum: Chordata
- Class: Aves
- Order: Passeriformes
- Family: Cotingidae
- Genus: Pipreola
- Species: P. frontalis

Binomial name
- Pipreola frontalis (Sclater, PL, 1859)

= Scarlet-breasted fruiteater =

Species of bird

The scarlet-breasted fruiteater (Pipreola frontalis) is a species of bird in the family Cotingidae. It is found in Bolivia, Ecuador, and Peru where its natural habitat is subtropical and tropical moist montane forests. Two subspecies are recognised though some researchers consider these should be regarded as distinct species. It is a plump green bird with a black head, the males having red throats and the females yellow. It is a relatively common species with a wide range, and the International Union for Conservation of Nature has rated its conservation status as being "least concern".

== Taxonomy and systematics ==
First described by British ornithologist Philip Sclater in 1858, the scarlet-breasted fruiteater is one of eleven species in the genus Pipreola. Its holotype is held at the Academy of Natural Sciences of Drexel University, in Philadelphia. The species is closely related to the fiery-throated fruiteater, but is found at higher elevations. There are two subspecies, which some taxonomists think represent two distinct species.

- P. f. frontalis occurs from central Peru into western Bolivia.
- P. f. squamipectus occurs from northern Ecuador into northwestern Peru. First described by Frank Chapman in 1925, it is smaller and less colorful than the nominate subspecies.

The genus name given to the fruiteaters, Pipreola, is a diminutive of Pipra, which is the genus name Carl Linnaeus gave to the similarly shaped manakins. The specific name frontalis is a Modern Latin word meaning "fronted" or "browed".

== Description ==
Like all Pipreola fruiteaters, the scarlet-breasted fruiteater is a plump, short-tailed cotinga. It is relatively small for a fruiteater, measuring 15.5–16.5 cm (6.1–6.5 in) in length; its mass ranges from 39.5 to 45.3 g (1.39 to 1.60 oz), with an average of 42.4 g (1.50 oz). The species is sexually dimorphic; the male is considerably more colorful than the female. Both sexes have bright green upperparts, with narrow yellow tips to the tertial feathers. The male's throat and upper breast are bright red (less extensively colored in P. f. squamipectus than in P. f. frontalis), while the female's underparts are yellow with green scaling or spots. Its legs and feet are pink or orange.

== Distribution and habitat ==
The scarlet-breasted fruiteater is restricted to the eastern slope of the Andes from northeastern Ecuador through eastern Peru to central Bolivia. It is found in montane forests at elevations ranging from 900–2,000 m (3,000–6,600 ft) above sea level.

== Behavior ==
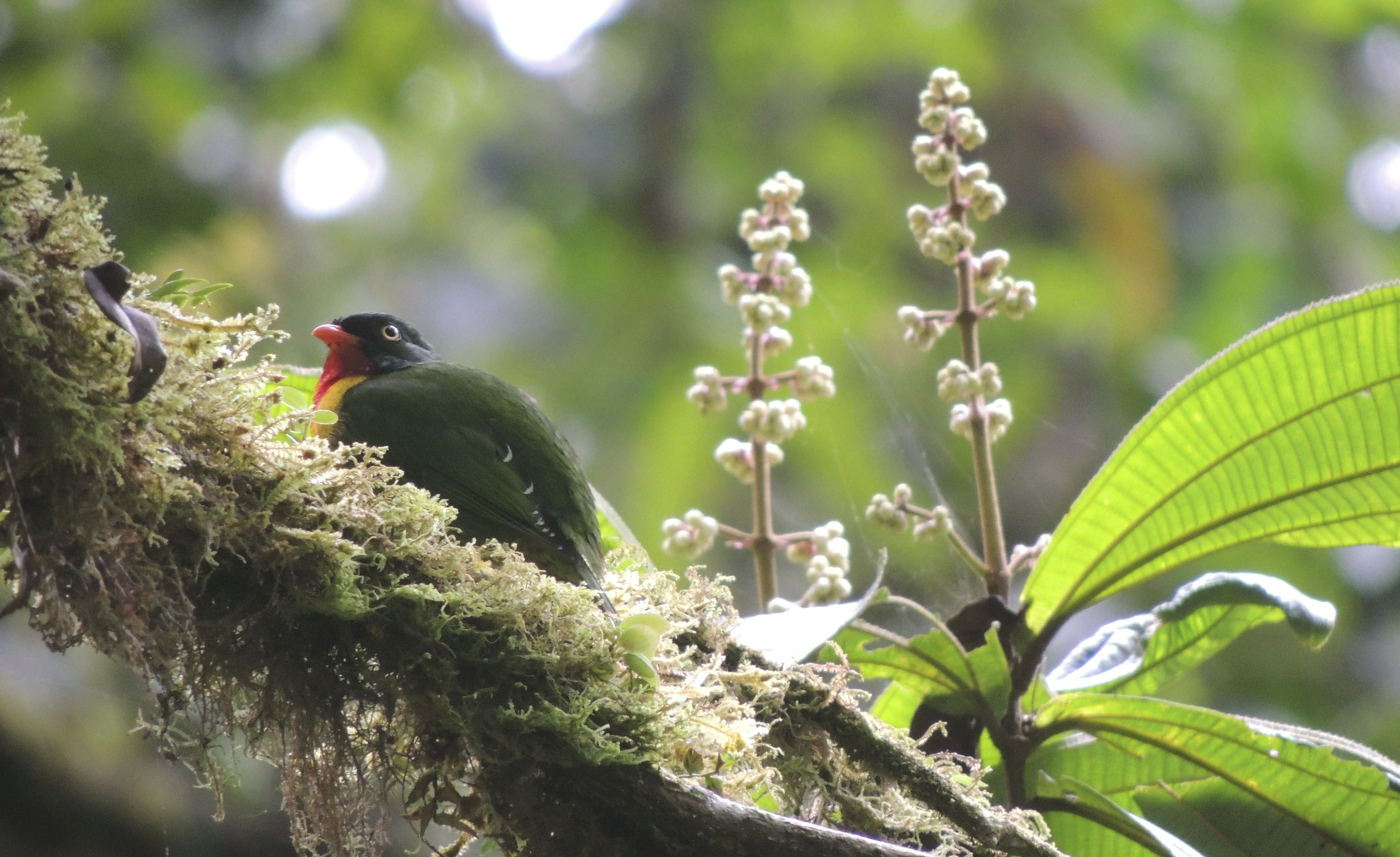
Scarlet-breasted Fruiteaters tend to occur higher up in the trees than many other fruiteaters.

The scarlet-breasted fruiteater is arboreal and often occurs higher up, from mid-levels to sub-canopy, than many other members of its genus. Like other fruiteaters, it tends to be rather lethargic.

=== Feeding ===
As its name suggests, the scarlet-breasted fruiteater eats primarily fruit, which it picks while hover-gleaning or, less frequently, while perched.

=== Voice ===
The scarlet-breasted fruiteater's vocalizations are generally short, high-pitched and infrequent. The song of the P. f. squamipectus male is sharp and ascending, variously transcribed as "psii" or "tsweeet", while the song of the P. f. frontalis male is longer and more complex—a thin, rising trill that becomes a descending whistle, transcribed as "ti'ti'ti'ti'ti'ti'tseeeeeeeeer". Its call is a very high-pitched pseet.

== Conservation and threats ==
The International Union for Conservation of Nature (IUCN) categorizes the Scarlet-breasted Fruiteater as a species of "least concern", based on its very large range and its status as a fairly common species within its range. However, its population size has never been quantified, and is thought to be decreasing.

The scarlet-breasted fruiteater is known to carry several species of bird lice, including members of the genera Myrsidea and Philopterus.

== Citations ==
=== Sources ===
- BirdLife International (2016). "Scarlet-breasted Fruiteater: Pipreola frontalis". IUCN Red List of Threatened Species. 2016 e.T103676613A93797721. doi:10.2305/IUCN.UK.2016-3.RLTS.T103676613A93797721.en.
- Clayton, D. H.; Gregory, R. D. & Price, R. D. (October 1992). "Comparative Ecology of Neotropical Bird Lice (Insecta: Phthiraptera)" (PDF). Journal of Animal Ecology. 61 (3): 781–795. Bibcode:1992JAnEc..61..781C. doi:10.2307/5631. JSTOR 5631.
- Jobling, James A. (2010). Helm Dictionary of Scientific Bird Names. London, UK: Christopher Helm. ISBN 978-1-4081-2501-4.
- Ridgely, Robert S.; Greenfield, Paul J. (2001). The Birds of Ecuador. London, UK: Christopher Helm. ISBN 978-0-7136-6117-0.
- Ridgely, Robert S.; Tudor, Guy (2009). Field Guide to the Songbirds of South America: The Passerines. Austin, TX, USA: University of Texas Press. ISBN 978-0-292-71748-0.
- Sibley, Charles G. & Monroe, Bert L. (1990). Distribution and Taxonomy of Birds of the World. New Haven, CT, USA: Yale University Press. ISBN 978-0-300-04969-5.
