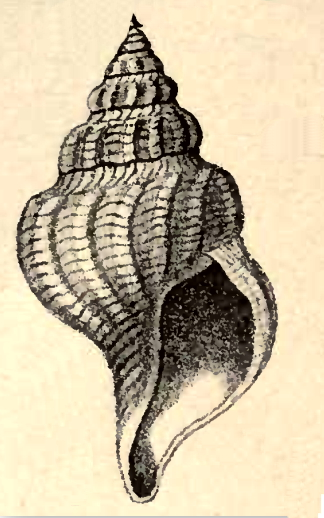
- Shell of Pleurotomella formosa

Scientific classification
- Kingdom: Animalia
- Phylum: Mollusca
- Class: Gastropoda
- Subclass: Caenogastropoda
- Order: Neogastropoda
- Superfamily: Conoidea
- Family: Raphitomidae
- Genus: Pleurotomella
- Species: P. formosa

Binomial name
- Pleurotomella formosa (Jeffreys, 1867)

Synonyms
- Clathurella formosa (Jeffreys, 1867); Defrancia formosa Jeffreys, 1867; Pleurotomella packardii packardii Verrill, 1872

= Pleurotomella formosa =

Species of gastropod

Pleurotomella formosa is a species of sea snail, a marine gastropod mollusk in the family Raphitomidae.

== Description ==
The length of the shell varies between 15 mm and 22 mm.

The thin, opaque shell is, dark-colored. The sculpture is variable, the longitudinal varying from striae to ribs, sometimes nodulous. The suture is deep, with a sloping infrasutural groove. The sinus is remarkably deep and broad.

== Distribution ==
This marine species was found at bathyal depths off the Faroes in the North Atlantic Ocean.
