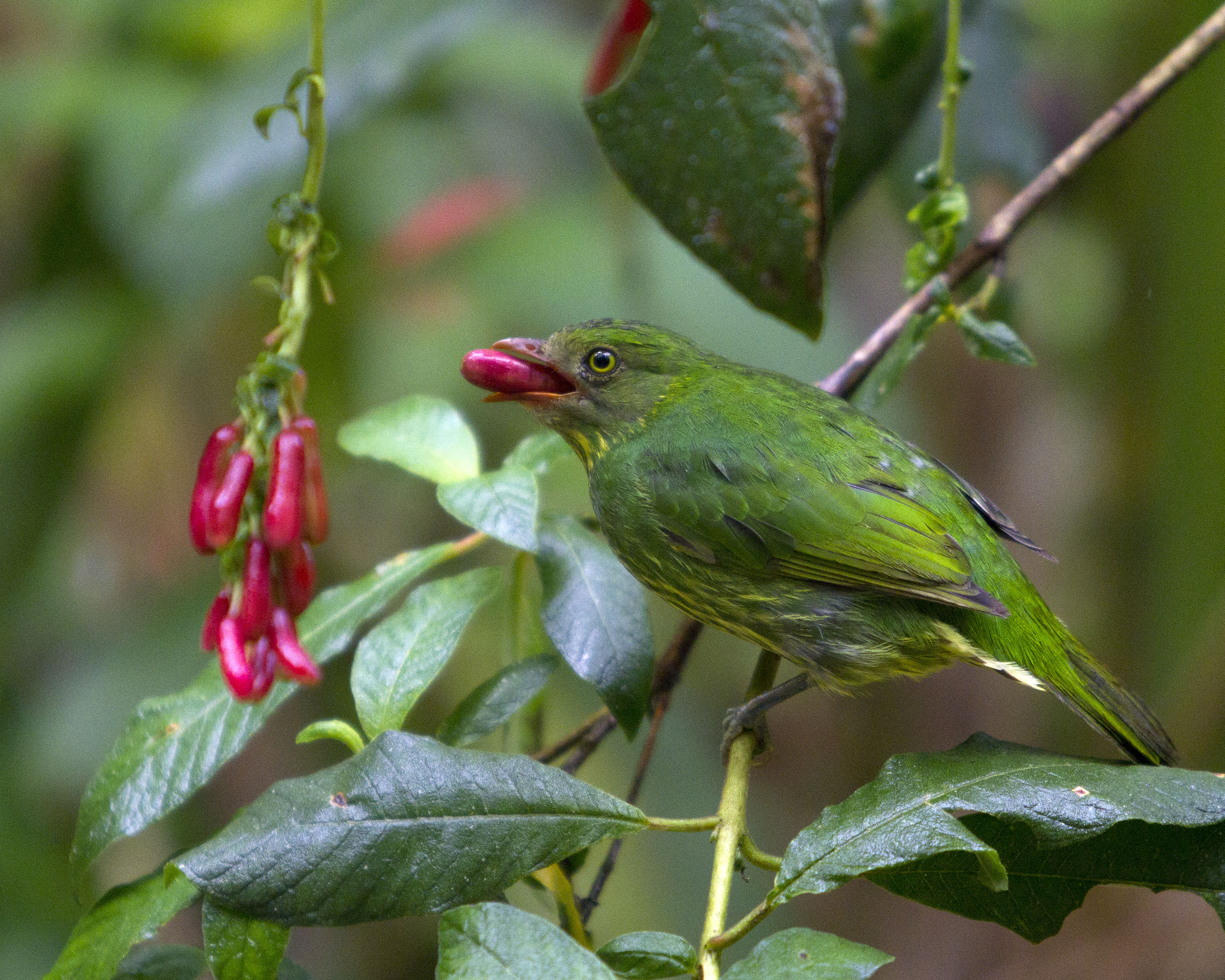
- female

Conservation status
- Least Concern (IUCN 3.1)

Scientific classification
- Kingdom: Animalia
- Phylum: Chordata
- Class: Aves
- Order: Passeriformes
- Family: Cotingidae
- Genus: Pipreola
- Species: P. pulchra

Binomial name
- Pipreola pulchra (Hellmayr, 1917)

= Masked fruiteater =

Species of bird

The masked fruiteater (Pipreola pulchra) is a species of bird in the family Cotingidae endemic to Peru. Its natural habitat is subtropical or tropical moist montane forests on the eastern flanks of the Andes. Considering the bird's population size and its wide range, this species is classified by the IUCN as being of least concern.

== Description ==
At 17 cm (7 in), the masked fruiteater is a medium-sized fruiteater. Both the sexes are bright green above, with a yellowish iris, coral-coloured beak and grey legs. The male has a black face and upper throat, a bib-like orange lower throat, mottled green flanks and a yellowish belly. The female lacks the mask and bib, and its underparts are green streaked with yellow. This bird could be confused with the scarlet-breasted fruiteater (Pipreola frontalis), but that species has pale tips to the tertial wing feathers, the male has a scarlet throat but no collar, and the female has a yellow upper throat and unbarred breast.

The voice is a very high-pitched whistle "tseeeeeeeweee". The call note is a rising "tsweet".

== Distribution and habitat ==
The masked fruiteater is endemic to Peru. It occurs on the eastern side of the Andes Mountains at altitudes of between 1,600 to 2,400 metres (5,200 to 7,900 ft) where its natural habitat is montane forests.

== Status ==
Pipreola pulchra has a wide range and is common in most of its range. The population size has not been quantified, but it is thought that the total number of birds is decreasing. However this is at a slow rate, and the International Union for Conservation of Nature has assessed its conservation status as being of "least concern".
