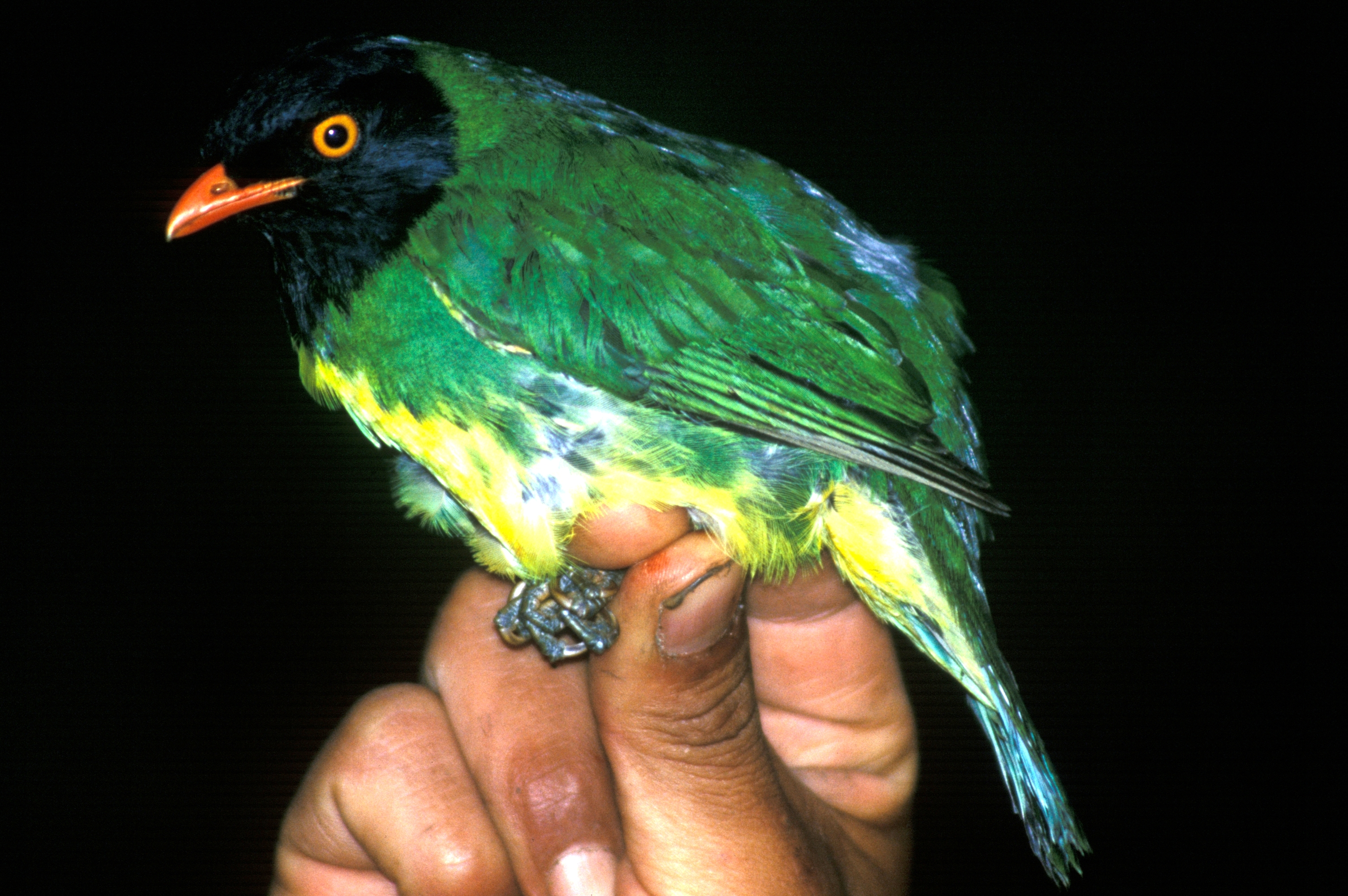
- Male

Conservation status
- Least Concern (IUCN 3.1)

Scientific classification
- Kingdom: Animalia
- Phylum: Chordata
- Class: Aves
- Order: Passeriformes
- Family: Cotingidae
- Genus: Pipreola
- Species: P. lubomirskii

Binomial name
- Pipreola lubomirskii Taczanowski, 1879

= Black-chested fruiteater =

Species of bird

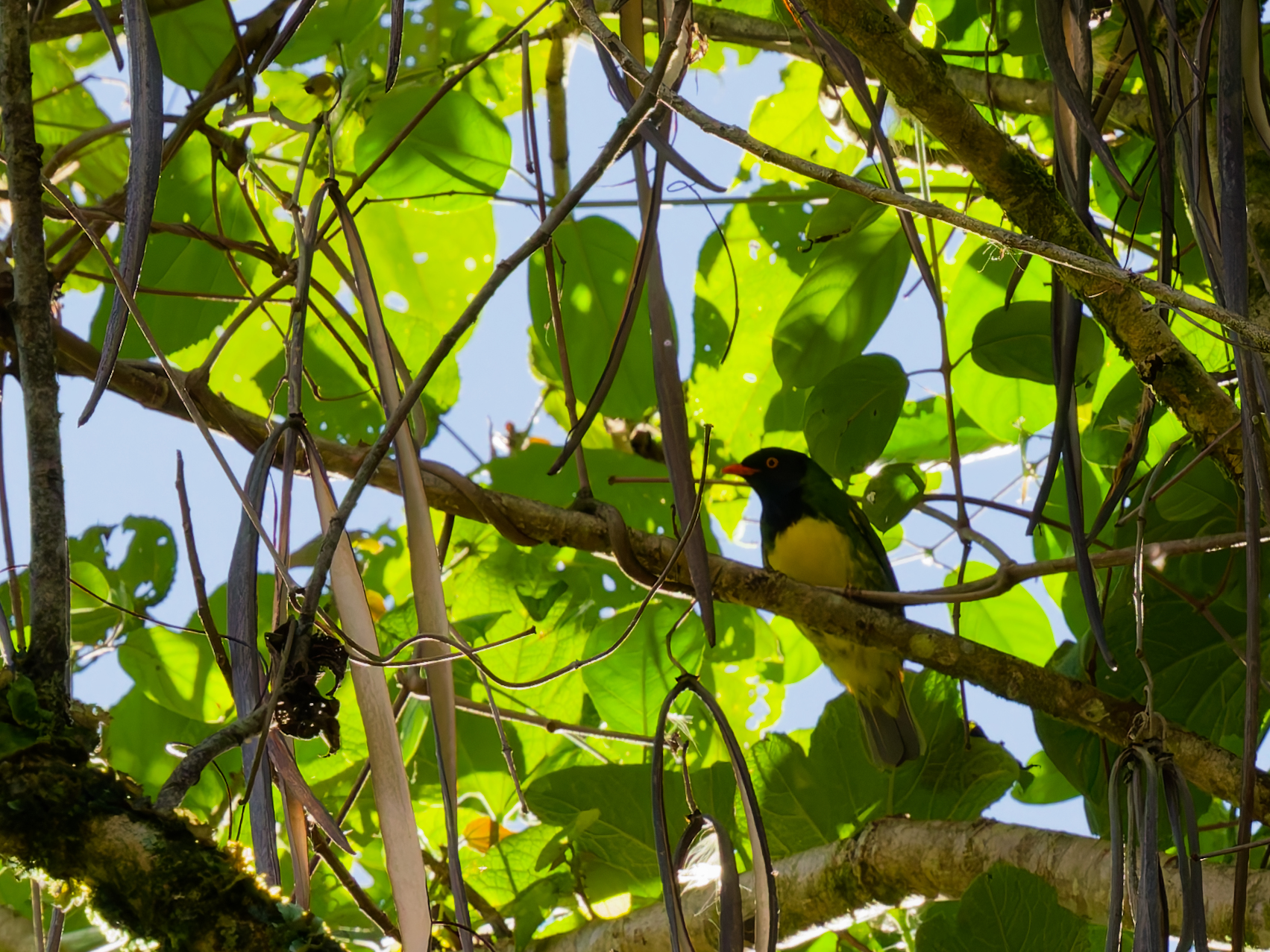
Black-chested Fruiteater

The black-chested fruiteater (Pipreola lubomirskii) is a species of bird in the family Cotingidae found in Colombia, Ecuador, and Peru, mostly on the eastern side of the Andes. Its natural habitat is subtropical and tropical moist montane forests and the IUCN lists its status as being of "least concern".

== Description ==
Fruiteaters are stocky birds with short tails and short tarsi (lower legs). The black-chested fruiteater is a medium-size fruiteater with a length of 18 cm (7.1 in). The male has a black head, throat and upper breast. The upper parts of the body are bright green and the underparts yellowish-green with mottling on the flanks. The female lacks the black head region and has a bright green back, throat and cheat and underparts streaked with yellow and green. The iris is yellow in both sexes, the beak pinkish-orange and the legs greenish-grey. This species could be confused with the green-and-black fruiteater (Pipreola riefferii), but the latter species has pale barring on the tertial wing feathers, and a yellow border to the black chest in the male. The song is a faint, high-pitched ascending whistle "tseeeeeeweee", and there are further short, rising and falling, whistling calls.

== Distribution and habitat ==
The black-chested fruiteater is native to the Andean region of South America. Its range extends on the eastern side of the Andes from southern Colombia, through Ecuador, to northern Peru; it is found in montane forests and its altitudinal range is 1,500 to 2,300 m (4,900 to 7,500 ft). It also occurs as separate populations locally on the western side of the Andes at Cajamarca and in the south of Marañón Province.

== Status ==
Though somewhat uncommon and with a rather restricted range, the population of the black-chested fruiteater seems stable and the International Union for Conservation of Nature has rated it as being a "least-concern species".
