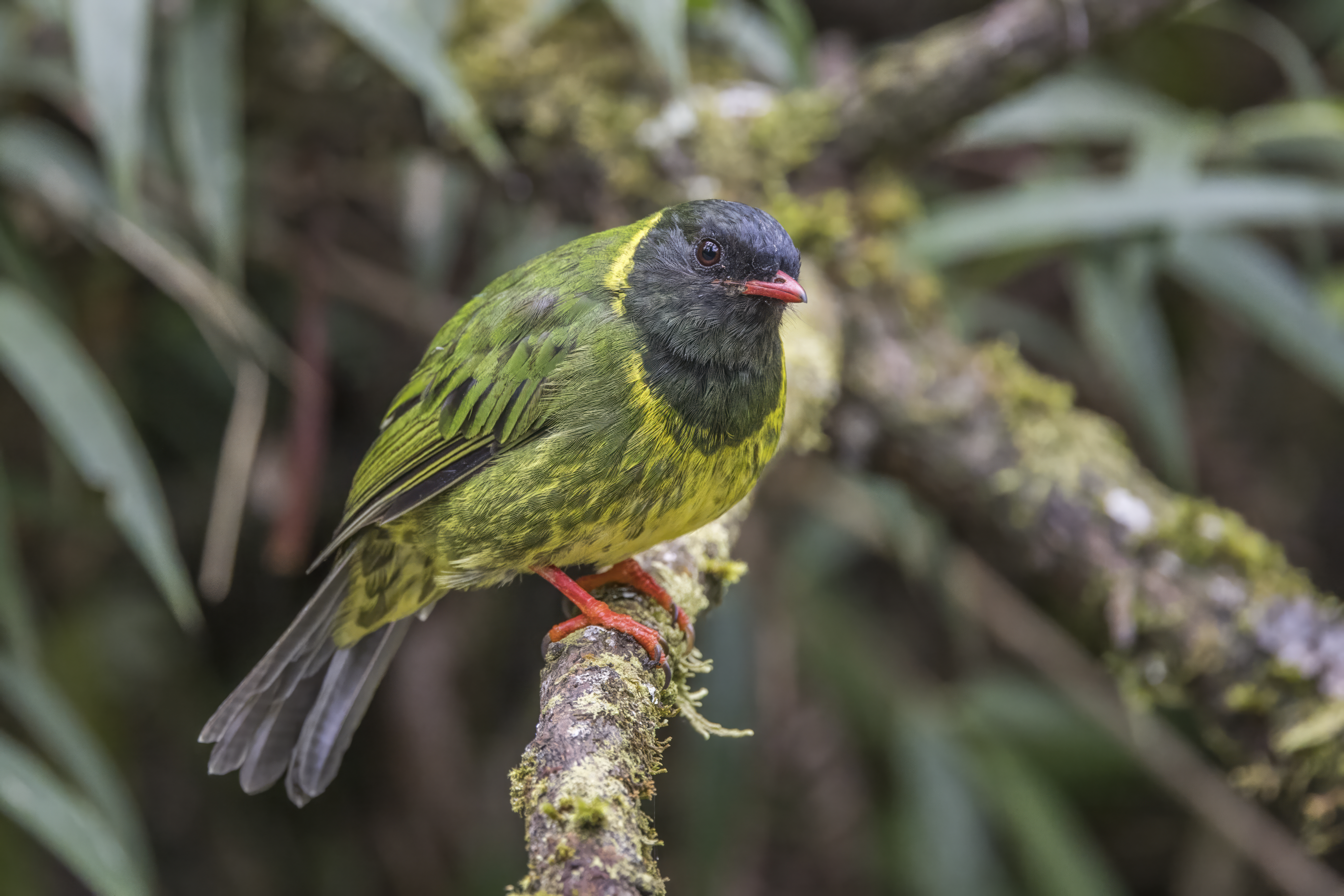
- Male P. r. riefferii, Colombia

Conservation status
- Least Concern (IUCN 3.1)

Scientific classification
- Kingdom: Animalia
- Phylum: Chordata
- Class: Aves
- Order: Passeriformes
- Family: Cotingidae
- Genus: Pipreola
- Species: P. riefferii

Binomial name
- Pipreola riefferii (Boissonneau, 1840)

= Green-and-black fruiteater =

Species of bird

The green-and-black fruiteater (Pipreola riefferii) is a species of bird in the family Cotingidae, the cotingas. It is found in Colombia, Ecuador, Peru, and Venezuela.

== Taxonomy and systematics ==
The green-and-black fruiteater was originally described as Ampelis riefferii. It was soon moved to its present genus Pipreola.

The green-and-black fruiteater's further taxonomy is unsettled. The IOC and Birdlife International's Handbook of the Birds of the World assign it these six subspecies:

- P. r. occidentalis (Chapman, 1914)
- P. r. riefferii (Boissonneau, 1840)
- P. r. confusa Zimmer, JT, 1936
- P. r. chachapoyas (Hellmayr, 1915)
- P. r. melanolaema Sclater, PL, 1856
- P. r. tallmanorum O'Neill & Parker, TA, 1981

However, the Clements taxonomy does not recognize P. r. confusa, including it within P. r. chachapoyas.

What is now the band-tailed fruiteater (P. intermedia) was originally described as a subspecies of the green-and-black fruiteater. Authors have suggested that both P. r. tallmanorum and P. r. melanolaema deserve full species status.

== Description ==
The green-and-black fruiteater is 17.5 to 20 cm (6.9 to 7.9 in) long and weighs 46 to 61 g (1.6 to 2.2 oz). The sexes have different plumage. Adult males of the nominate subspecies P. r. riefferii have an entirely blackish green head and upper breast with a yellow band ("collar") around its base except on the nape. Their upperparts and tail are green and the wings mostly that color; the wing's tertials have white tips. Their underparts are yellow with black streaks that are heavier on the flanks than in the center. Females have a green head instead of the male's black and no yellow collar.

The other subspecies of the green-and-black fruiteater differ from the nominate and each other thus:

- P. r. occidentalis: males have a greenish wash on the throat and chest and only faint white tertial tips
- P. r. confusa: smaller than nominate; greenish upper breast and heavy green streaks on underparts
- P. r. chachapoyas: smaller than nominate; heavy green streaks on underparts
- P. r. melanolaema: darker wings than nominate; males have black hood; females have faint yellow collar
- P. r. tallmanorum: smallest subspecies; brighter red eyes than nominate; male has very glossy black hood and unstreaked lower breast and belly; female has bolder underparts green streaks than nominate

Both sexes of all subspecies have a dark red-brown iris, a bright red bill, and red or orange-red legs and feet.

== Distribution and habitat ==
The green-and-black fruiteater has a disjunct distribution. The subspecies are found thus:

- P. r. occidentalis: Colombia's Western Andes and south on the Andean west slope to El Oro Province in southwestern Ecuador
- P. r. riefferii: Colombia's Central and Eastern Andes into far western Venezuela's Táchira and Zulia states; the isolated Serranía del Perijá straddling the Colombia-Venezuela border
- P. r. confusa: eastern Andean slope through Ecuador slightly into northern Peru
- P. r. chachapoyas: eastern Andean slope in Peru from central Amazonas south to Huánuco Department
- P. r. melanolaema: Venezuelan Andes from central Táchira north into southern Lara; Venezuelan Coastal Range from Aragua east to Miranda
- P. r. tallmanorum: central Peru's Huánuco Department

The green-and-black fruiteater inhabits the edges and interior of montane forest, including cloudforest, and secondary woodland in the subtropical and lower temperate zones. In elevation it ranges between 1,800 and 3,050 m (5,900 and 10,000 ft) in the Venezuelan Andes and mostly between 1,750 and 2,150 m (5,700 and 7,100 ft) in the Coastal Range. It ranges between 1,500 and 3,200 m (4,900 and 10,500 ft) in Colombia, and mostly between 1,700 and 2,900 m (5,600 and 9,500 ft) in Ecuador and Peru.

== Behavior ==
=== Movement ===
The green-and-black fruiteater is a year-round resident.

=== Feeding ===
The green-and-black fruiteater is believed to feed only on fruit but details are lacking. It forages singly, in pairs, and occasionally in small groups and often joins mixed-species feeding flocks. It plucks fruit while perched or while briefly hovering after a short flight.

=== Breeding ===
The only data on the green-and-black fruiteater's breeding biology come from two nests in Colombia. Eggs were laid between February and August. The nests were cups made mostly from moss lined with rootlets. They were in small vegetation between about 1 and 2 m (3 and 7 ft) above the ground. The clutch size was two eggs.

=== Vocalization ===
The song of most subspecies of the green-and-black fruiteater has variously been written as "tic-tic-ti-ti-ti-tiseeeeeeeeeeeeaa" and "ts-s-s-s-s-s-se-eeeeeeeeuuw". Their call is a "[v]ery high-pitched, sibilant ti-ti-ti-ti for up to 5 seconds, dying away". Subspecies P. r. tallmanorum's call is different, "ti-ti-ti-seeee" with a thin, high-pitched last note.

== Status ==
The IUCN has assessed the green-and-black fruiteater as being of Least Concern. It has very large range; its population size is not known and is believed to be decreasing. No immediate threats have been identified. It is considered "fairly common to common" in Venezuela, common in Colombia, and fairly common in Ecuador and Peru. It is the "most widespread and abundant of the Andean fruiteaters [and] is ecologically the most tolerant." It occurs in several protected areas.
