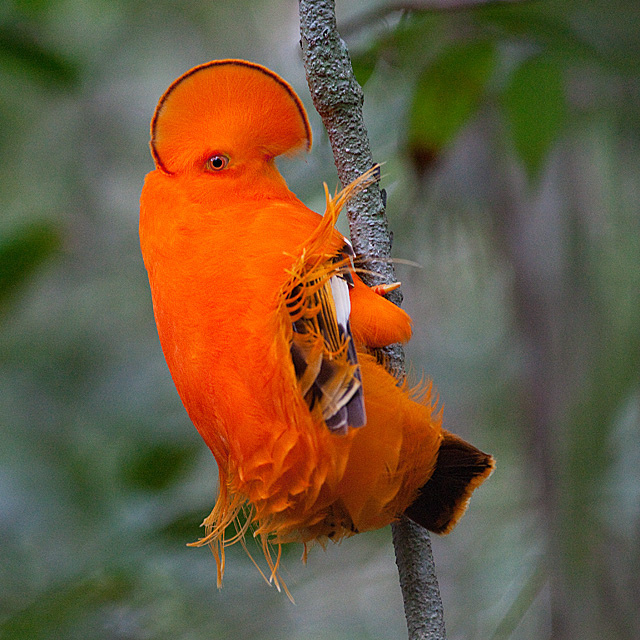
- Male
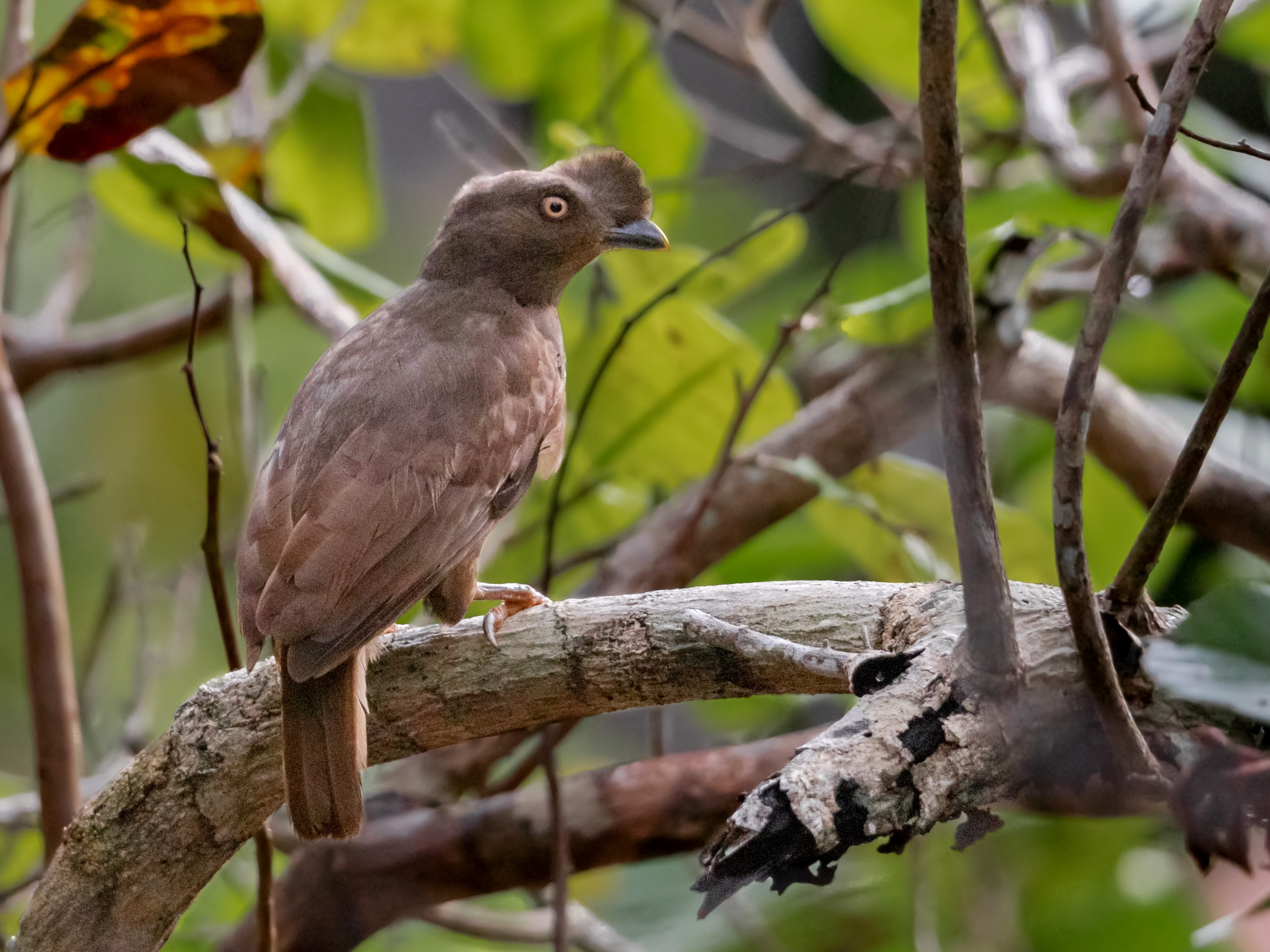
- Female

Conservation status
- Least Concern (IUCN 3.1)
- CITES Appendix II

Scientific classification
- Kingdom: Animalia
- Phylum: Chordata
- Class: Aves
- Order: Passeriformes
- Family: Cotingidae
- Genus: Rupicola
- Species: R. rupicola

Binomial name
- Rupicola rupicola (Linnaeus, 1766)

Synonyms
- Pipra rupicola Linnaeus, 1766

= Guianan cock-of-the-rock =

Species of bird

The Guianan cock-of-the-rock (Rupicola rupicola) is a species of cotinga, a passerine bird from South America. It is about 30 cm (12 in) in length and weighs about 200 to 220 g (7.1 to 7.8 oz). It is found in tropical rainforests, near its preferred habitat of rocky outcrops. The female's plumage is brownish/dark smokey grey in colour, and generally less noticeable than the males because of their nesting work in rocky areas. The male's feathers are a bright orange. Both have a heavy body, broad-based bill and wear a remarkable half-moon crest on the head. It is one of two species of the genus Rupicola, the other being the Andean cock-of-the-rock. The Guianan cock-of-the-rock lives across the forested region of northeastern South America. Its diet consists mostly of fruit, but they sometimes feast on small snakes and lizards.

The Guianan cock-of-the-rock breeds in the early months of the year and, on average, the female lays her eggs around March. The females choose a mate by flying down to the ground and pecking the male on his rump. The male then turns around and the mating takes place almost immediately. During the height of the mating season, males engage in competitive displays in the lek, which is a complex courting behaviour that is done to attract females. Males and females live separately except when the females choose a mate. The mating success varies based on multiple factors, ranging from the plumage exhibited by a male to the composition of the lek itself. There is speculation that the male–male competition is an important factor in lek formation and breeding. The main predators of the Guianan cock-of-the-rock are harpy eagles and black-and-white hawk-eagles.

== Description ==
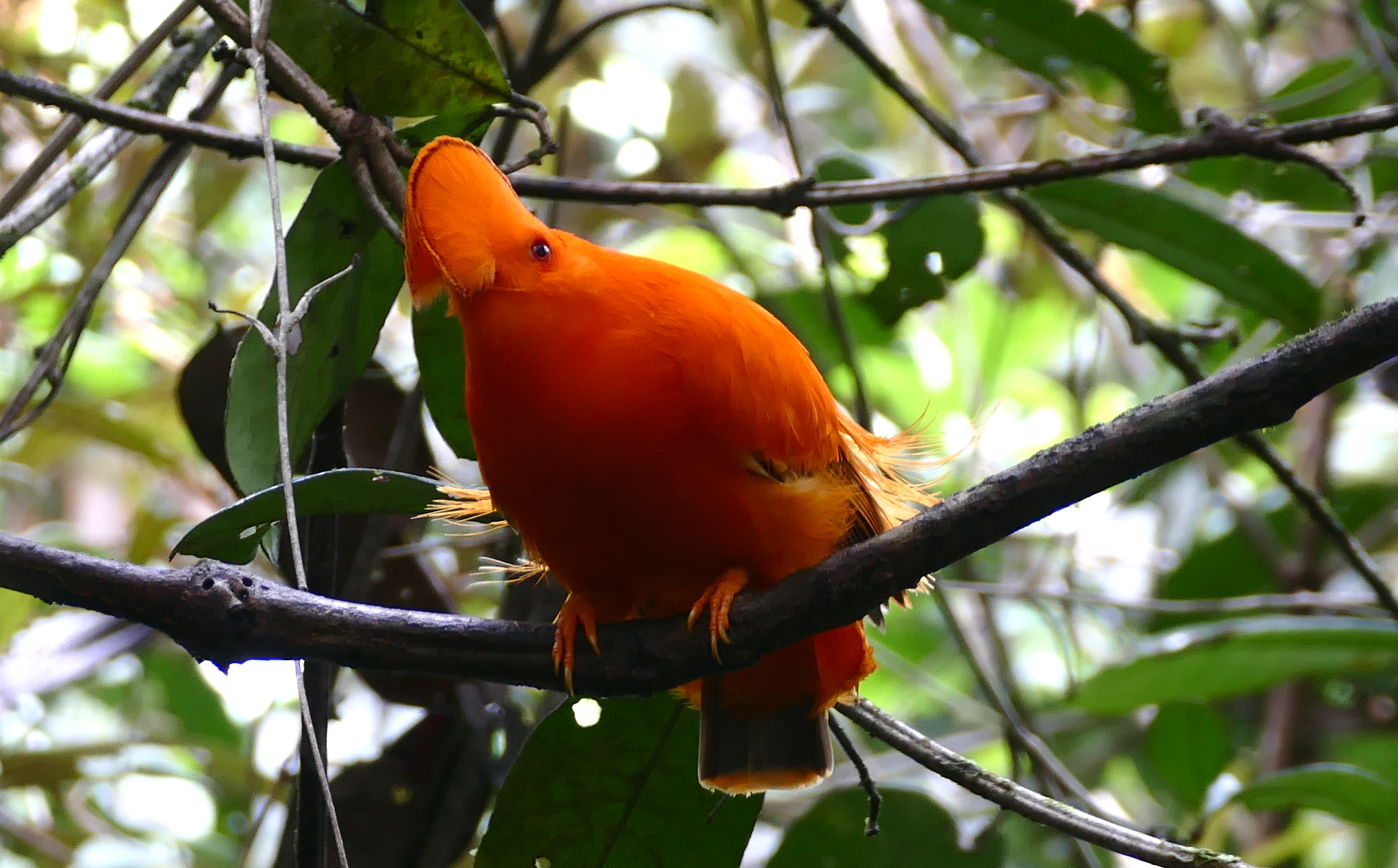
Male Guianan Cock-of-the-rock perched, showing a frontal view of the eccentric crests

The Guianan cock-of-the-rock is a stout-bodied bird with a prominent half-moon crest. It is a sexually dimorphic bird. The male's crest is more pronounced than the female's and is bright orange. The males also have an orange-tipped black tail, black, orange, and white wings, a bright orange bill, an orange iris yellowing as it nears the outer edge, and silky-orange filamentous feathers of the inner remiges. Both sexes also have orange legs and skin. The less conspicuous female is dark brownish-grey overall and has a yellow-tipped black bill, a duller orange iris, and a smaller crest. One-year-old juvenile male looks similar to an adult female but has orange speckles over its body. After two years, the juvenile males become mostly orange with brown and grey spots. Males attain their definitive plumage at around three years. Juvenile females look almost identical to their adult counterparts. Guianan cocks-of-the-rock have a total length of approximately 30 cm (12 in) and a total weight of around 200 to 220 g (7.1 to 7.8 oz). The two species of cock-of-the-rock are allopatric, and therefore do not meet with one another. The plumage of the male Andean cock-of-the-rock is redder and its wings are mostly black, lacking the orange colouration seen on the male Guianan. The female Andean cock-of-the-rock is reddish brown rather than the brownish-gray of the Guianan.

== Etymology ==
The generic and specific names are derived from the Latin words rupes "rock" or "cliff", and cola "inhabiting", which express its habit of nesting on rock walls.

== Taxonomy ==
The Guianan cock-of-the-rock is one of two species of the genus Rupicola. It was described by Carl Linnaeus in 1766 as the type species of its genus. Its closest relative and congener, the Andean cock-of-the-rock (Rupicola peruvianus), is similar in body shape and colouration, though the two are wholly allopatric from each other. Their closest family relatives are the Red cotingas (Genus Phoenicircus). The two Rupicola species are in the subfamily Rupicolinae, which also includes other species of cotingas such as the before-mentioned Red cotingas (Genus Phoenicircus, which is a sister genus to Rupicola), Snowornis pihas, and the berryeaters (Genus Carpornis).

== Range and habitat ==
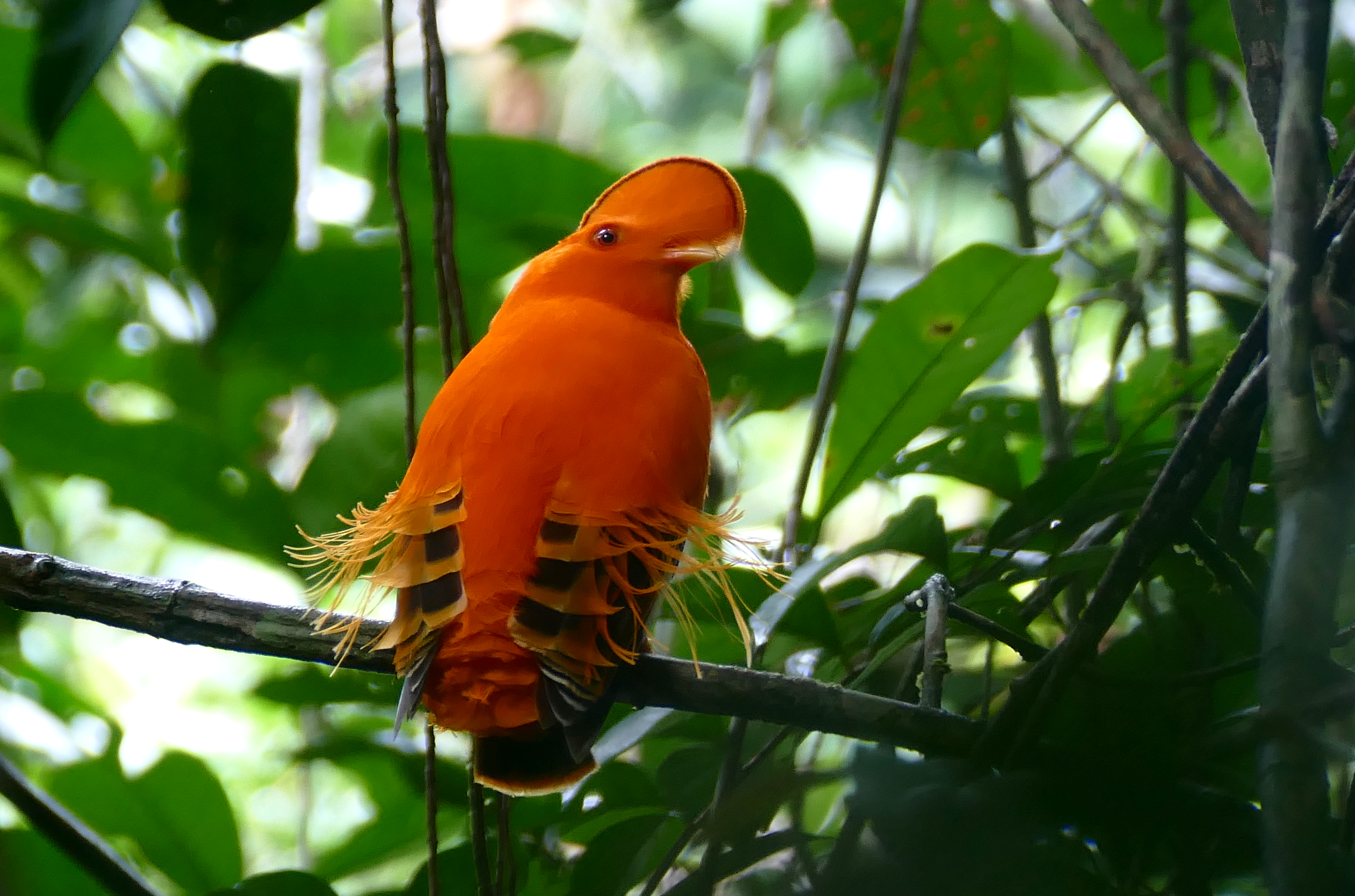
Male in his lush, tropical habitat

As suggested by its name, the Guianan cock-of-the-rock is found in the Guianan Shield, occurring in French Guiana, Suriname, Guyana, southern Venezuela, eastern Colombia, and northern Amazonian Brazil. Its preferred habitats are humid forests near rocky outcrops. They are normally found at an altitude of 300 to 2,000 m (980 to 6,560 ft).

The Guianan cock-of-the-rock has distinctive territorial markings. Males usually take dominance of an area on the ground, although sometimes they occupy middle strata in forests. They make their characteristic marking by clearing out debris from the ground, including twigs, leaves, and pellets. This area is called a "court". Quality of courts is known to have some influence on mate choice. The court quality is determined by the territory density and location to the center of activity in the lek. The reason for the focus on the center of activity in the lek is that successful males tended to own courts in the most densely clustered lek areas. Guianan courts are commonly found in the Guianan Shield, a forested region in northeastern South America.

== Ecology and behavior ==
=== Diet ===
The diet of the adult Guianan cock-of-the-rock consists mainly of fruits meaning they are frugivorous. Up to 65 species of fruit have been reported in their diet, primarily from canopy trees or lianas. Three-quarters (75%) of the fruit eaten by the Guianan cock-of-the-rock at one study site were either black- or red-coloured fruit. In British Guiana, E. Thomas Gilliard found papayas growing at the base of a huge rock. On top of the rock were perched females that were nesting. He found that no other papayas were growing in that part of the forest and speculated that the perched females ate papayas in the forest where they are native and dropped the seeds below where they were nesting. Small snakes, lizards, insects and frogs are occasionally found in its diet. By selectively feeding on nearby fruit trees and then defecating or regurgitating the seeds within the leks, these birds can actively influence the regeneration and succession of the forest habitat where they breed.

=== Breeding ===
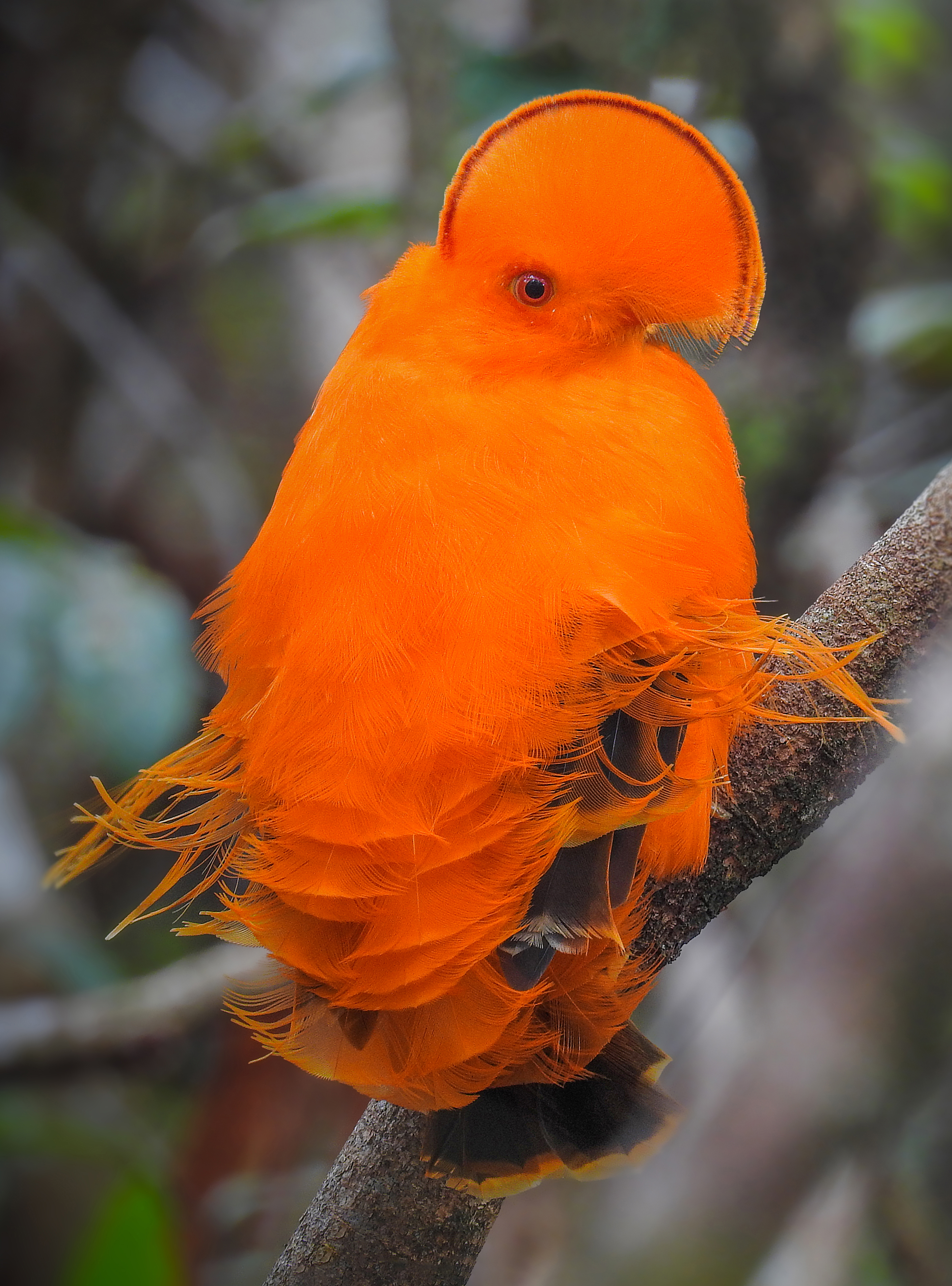
Closer view of the male's crest and ornamental feathers

Guianan cocks-of-the-rock breed early in the year, and the females lay their eggs around March, nesting in rocky areas. During the height of the mating season, males gather in leks with multiple males defending a social display arena of much greater area than that of a lone male. The males each have their own area on the forest floor where they make their courts. The size of each court is about 1 metre (3 ft) in diameter, and the next bird is often about 3 metres (10 ft) away. The females and males live separately; only when it is time to mate do females fly over to observe and choose a male. When this occurs, the females tap the males from behind and insemination quickly follows. When females approach a lek, the males stand firmly and present themselves rigidly.

Mating success is dependent on a variety of factors that range from the plumage exhibited by a male to the composition of the lek itself. In one study, the female Guianan cocks-of-the-rock displayed sexual selection based on sequential comparisons or threshold standards. The hens engaged in a "pool–comparison" tactic, meaning that females chose males of higher rank in courtship. Males of higher rank were those with more matings received from other females; the lower-ranking single males were ignored. The rankings were determined by where the courts were positioned in the lek: courts that were more centrally placed indicated more successful and higher-ranking males. The females in the study were individually observed to aggregate towards larger, more centrally concentrated leks, demonstrating active female choice.

==== Nesting ====
Unlike other species of the family Cotingidae, the Guianan cock-of-the-rock makes its nest on rocky cliff faces and caves rather than in the trees. The female lays one or two eggs in the nest of mud and plant material, which is attached by saliva to a vertical rock. The female takes care of the building and maintenance of the nest, the incubation of the eggs and the parenting. The male does not participate at all. Eggs typically incubate for 27–28 days. The ideal nesting sites for this species are usually located in a cave or vertical rock face with crevices that provide some shelter and protection from the elements. The nests themselves are solid moldings formed from mud and plant material deposited into the crevices. Due to the solid nature of these nests, they typically persist from one breeding season to the next. Females will make repairs to their nests as the breeding season begins.

==== Mating behavior ====
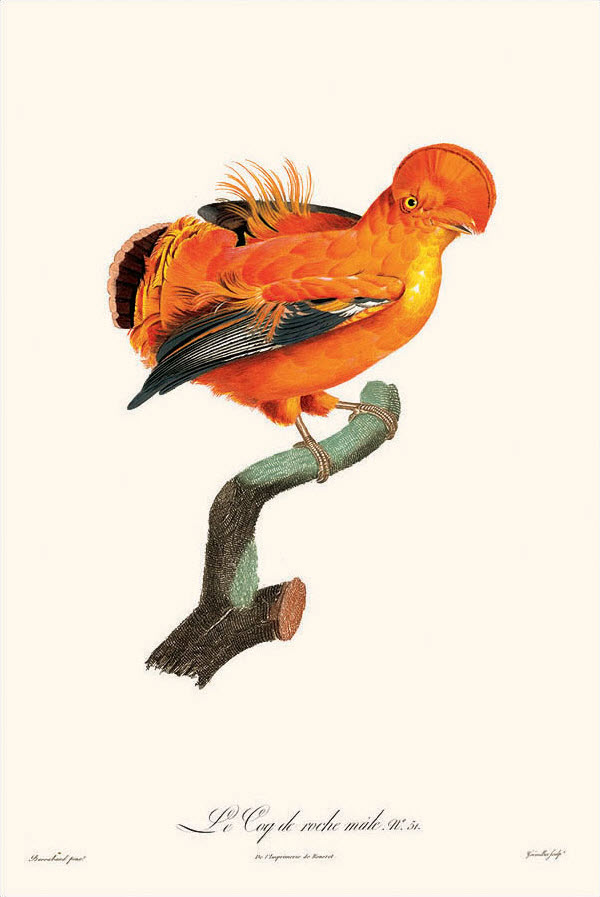
Illustration by Jacques Barraband showing male plumage

The smaller of the two cocks-of-the-rock, the male Guianan takes the lesser part in breeding. It is polygynous and has nothing to do with nesting once mating is done. The male's energy instead is devoted to very elaborate display rituals that show off his magnificent plumage. These displays take place in communal leks, where 40 or more males may gather to challenge rivals and beckon to the females.

The displaying male purposely contrasts himself from the forest and shows his crest and plumage so much that the bill and tail become obscured, almost making him difficult to recognize as a bird, to attract females. Within the lek, each female has her own perch on a low branch, while the males own a "court" on the ground below that is cleared of dead leaves by the draughts of each male taking off and landing. The males have a variety of calls and movements, showing off the crest, elongated filaments on the rump, secondary feathers, and the snapping of their bills. Males display on branches about 2.5 metres (8.2 ft) from the ground until a female approaches when the males display and call from individual plots on the ground. Most males copulate with only a few females. However, some are very successful and may copulate with many. Unlike many other bird species, the male does not use resources nor parental care to entice females.

Males often engage in courtship disruption practices. In a study conducted by Pepper W. Trail, the interactions between adult males, females, and yearlings were observed and linked to mate choice and male dispersion patterns within leks. Adult males produced this disruptive behaviour with varying intensity, which depended on the situation. In lower-intensity disruptions, males usually directed their aggression or threats towards neighboring males, in attempts to improve or maintain breeding status and success. The males that were hassled tended to be more successful and often were disrupted with much greater frequency than males with lower mating success. Higher-intensity disruptions were used by less successful males and directed towards females who wandered by. This behaviour is suggested to have the effect of redirecting females towards the hassling male. Yearlings often disrupted courtships of the more mature adults on the basis of practice for future courtships, since the yearlings do not possess any territory within the lek. Female disruption was an uncommon event that had little, if any, effect on the accessibility of a male. Young males of highly promiscuous species such as the Cock-of-the rock often failed to mate in their first year, probably because older, more experienced males will enjoy the majority of matings. In this strong system of sexual selection, the successive breeding of dominant and aggressive males leads to high sex drives and the endurance of polygyny. A theory suggests that the selection of these aggressive males also puts a premium, or value, on female characteristics. Hence, there is a less likely occurrence of female-elicited aggression.

Male Guianan cock-of-the-rock "delight in homosexuality" with almost 40 percent engaging in a form of homosexual activity and a small percentage never copulating with females.

==== Ecological consequences of breeding ====
One possible advantage to lek formation (in Guianan cock-of-the-rock and other species) is severe selection and consequent rapid evolutionary advancement, all of which is possible due to the high expendability of males. Only a few males are needed to fertilize the next generation. The courtship behaviour is similarly theorized to have arisen from differences in the division of labour between the two sexes. Females expend their energy on building nests and rearing young, while males spend most of their time and energy on finding mates and caring for their plumage.

Guianan cocks-of-the-rock form large leks, averaging 55 adult males. The males in these display leks were especially vulnerable to attacks and predation by large snakes and other natural predators. In manipulated groups of smaller size, around 6, predation was less likely to occur, due to an inverse relationship between the number and frequency of attacks and the size of leks. Thus, with a smaller frequency of attacks on the smaller group, the Guianan cock-of-the-rock males were less likely to flush or disperse completely as compared to a large group where a false alarm could trigger a complete flush 90% of the time. It was found that these birds have relatively ineffective methods of anti-predation and that social anti-predation and the infrequency of encounters with predators were keeping these lekking males alive.

There is speculation that the simulation of male–male competition is important in lek formation and breeding.

==== Impact of natural and sexual selection on trait development ====
The colouration of the males allows them to visibly stand out from the brown forest floor. This bright colouration provides a sexual advantage for adult males, increasing their likelihood of successfully mating. The result is rapid evolutionary selection within the species for brighter plumage and more conspicuous behaviour patterns in the males. The bright colouration also makes the males more susceptible to predation. Males are more expendable for this reason; only a small number of males are needed within any generation in order to perpetuate the species. While sexual selection leads to bright plumage, natural selection, in turn, favors defensive colouration in the birds. There is higher fitness in birds monitoring nests whose colouration acts as camouflage-protection from predation.

== Conservation ==
Fairly common in its large range, and with its population stable, the Guianan cock-of-the-rock is considered by the International Union for Conservation of Nature to be a Least Concern on its red list of threatened species.

The main predators of the Guianan cock-of-the-rock are harpy eagles, black-and-white hawk-eagles, black hawk-eagles, and slaty-backed forest falcons. Felines such as the jaguar, mountain lion, and ocelot can also be predators, along with snakes such as the bird snake, Amazon tree boas, emerald tree boas, boa constrictor, tiger rat snake, and fer-de-lance.

The species is rare in captivity, but breeding has been achieved at a small number of facilities. The world's first successful captive breeding was at Dallas World Aquarium (US) in 2008.

=== Predation response ===
In larger lek groups, there is less risk of predation. In a group, there are more individuals to alert the group about an approaching predator. All the birds in the groups will be vigilant in looking for a predator because there is an advantage to seeing the predator first. There is also the risk that in a bigger group, there will be more false alarm signals. The common signal is vocalization, after which the birds will fly up into the trees. It was found the birds did not, however, give this signal when there was a snake.
