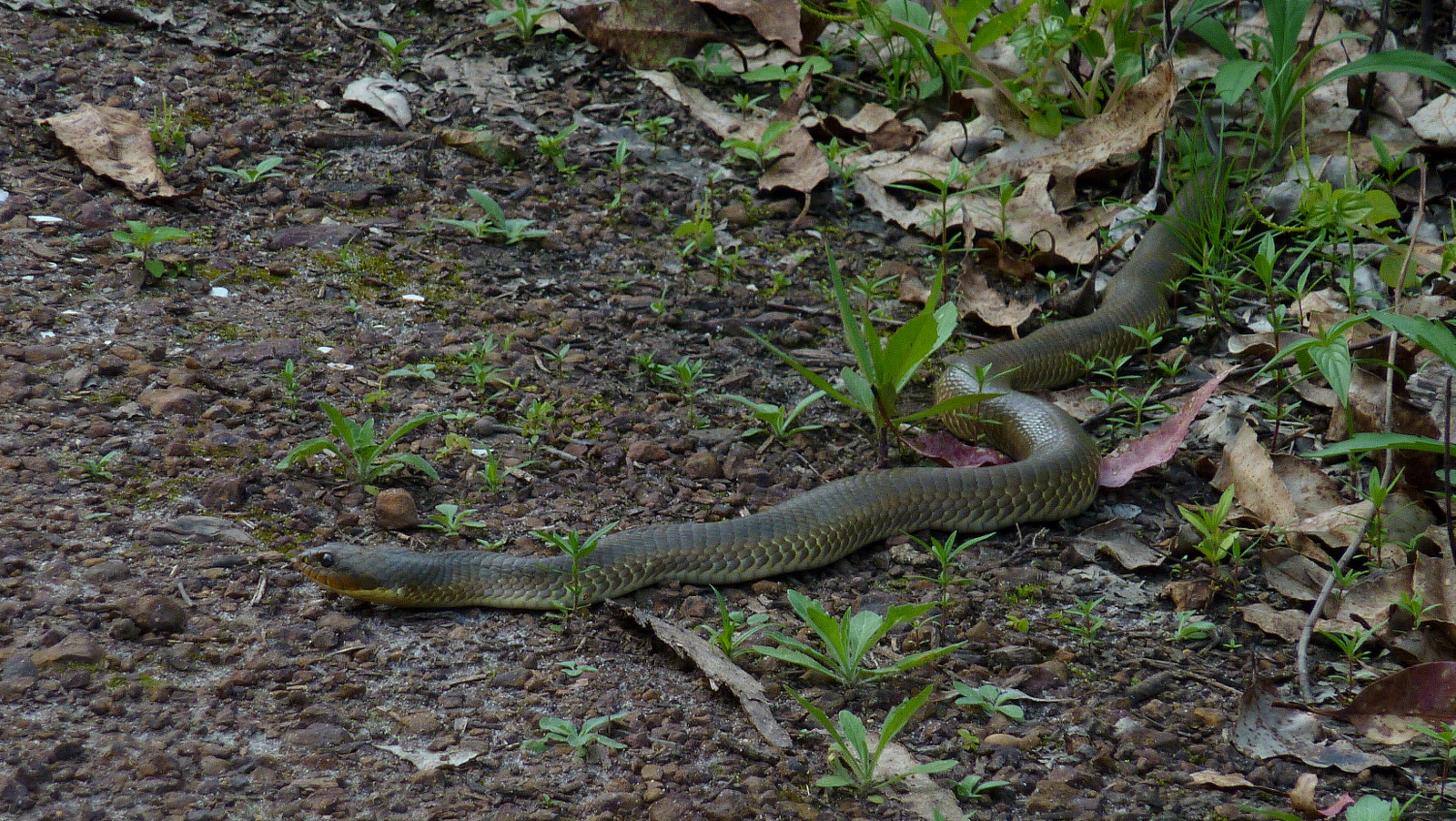
- Pseustes sulphureus, now Spilotes sulphureus, in Atlantic Forest in Bahia, Brazil

Scientific classification
- Kingdom: Animalia
- Phylum: Chordata
- Class: Reptilia
- Order: Squamata
- Suborder: Serpentes
- Family: Colubridae
- Subfamily: Colubrinae
- Genus: Pseustes; Fitzinger, 1843

= Pseustes =

Genus of snakes

Pseustes was a genus of snakes of the family Colubridae.

== Taxonomy ==
Jadin et al. (2013) reassigned all species of Pseustes to the genera Phrynonax and Spilotes.

== Species ==
- Pseustes cinnamomeus (Wagler, 1824) = Phrynonax sexcarinatus (Wagler, 1824)
- Pseustes poecilonotus (Günther, 1858) = Phrynonax poecilonotus (Günther, 1858)
- Pseustes sexcarinatus (Wagler, 1824) = Phrynonax sexcarinatus (Wagler, 1824)
- Pseustes shropshirei (Barbour & Amaral, 1924) = Phrynonax shropshirei (Barbour & Amaral, 1924)
- Pseustes sulphureus (Wagler, 1824) = Spilotes sulphureus (Wagler, 1824)
