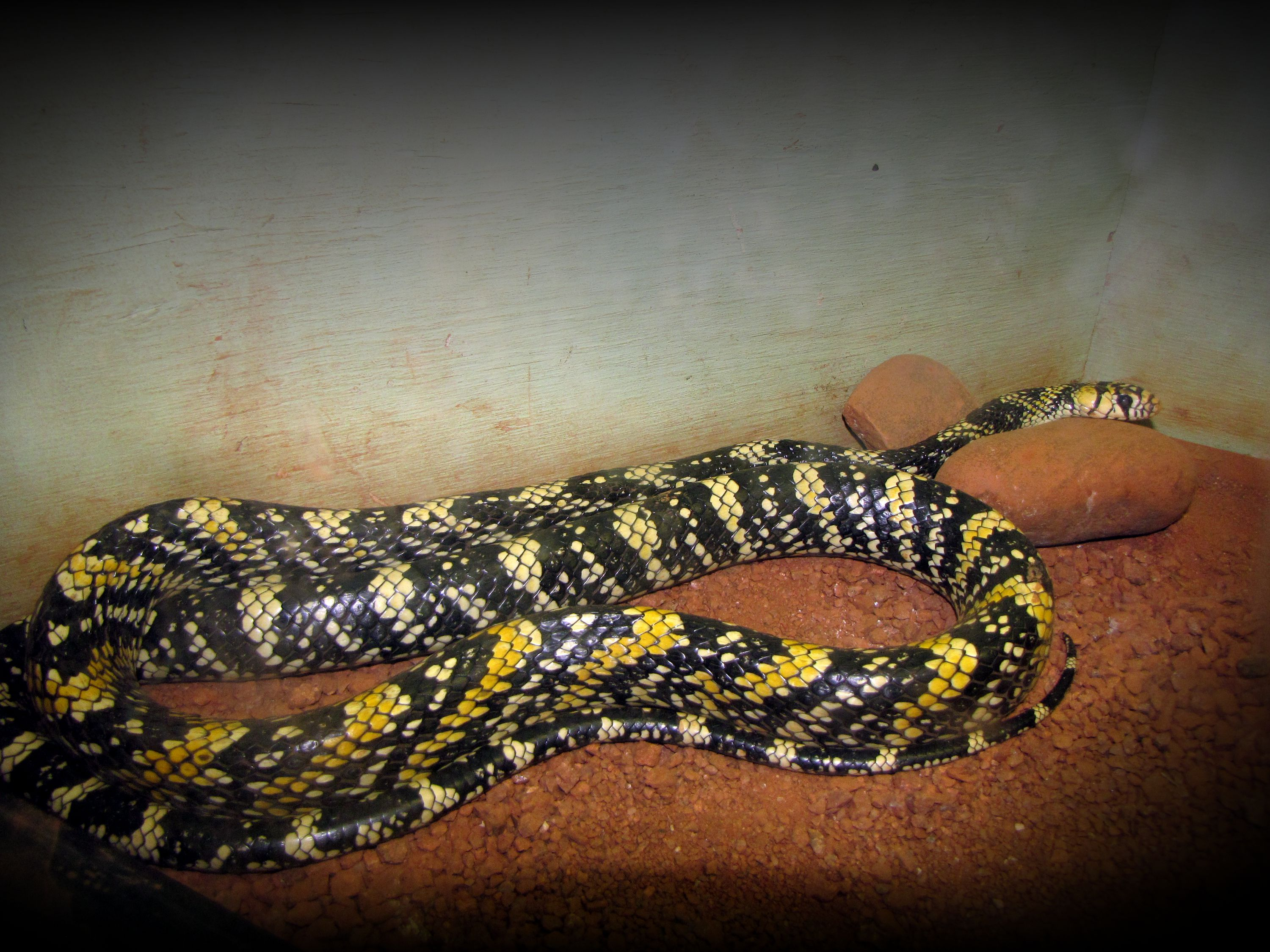
- Spilotes pullatus

Scientific classification
- Kingdom: Animalia
- Phylum: Chordata
- Class: Reptilia
- Order: Squamata
- Suborder: Serpentes
- Family: Colubridae
- Subfamily: Colubrinae
- Genus: Spilotes; Wagler, 1830

Synonyms
- Cerastes, Coluber, Dipsas, Herpetodryas, Natrix, Paraphrynonax, Phrynonax, Pseustes

= Spilotes =

Genus of snakes

Spilotes is a genus of snakes in the family Colubridae. The genus is endemic to the New World.

== Geographic range ==
Species in the genus Spilotes are found in Mexico, Central America, and South America.

== Species ==
Two species are recognized as being valid.

- Spilotes pullatus (Linnaeus, 1758) - chicken snake, tropical chicken snake, yellow rat snake
- Spilotes sulphureus (Wagler, 1824) - yellow-bellied hissing snake, Amazon puffing snake

Nota bene: A binomial authority in parentheses indicates that the species was originally described in a genus other than Spilotes.
