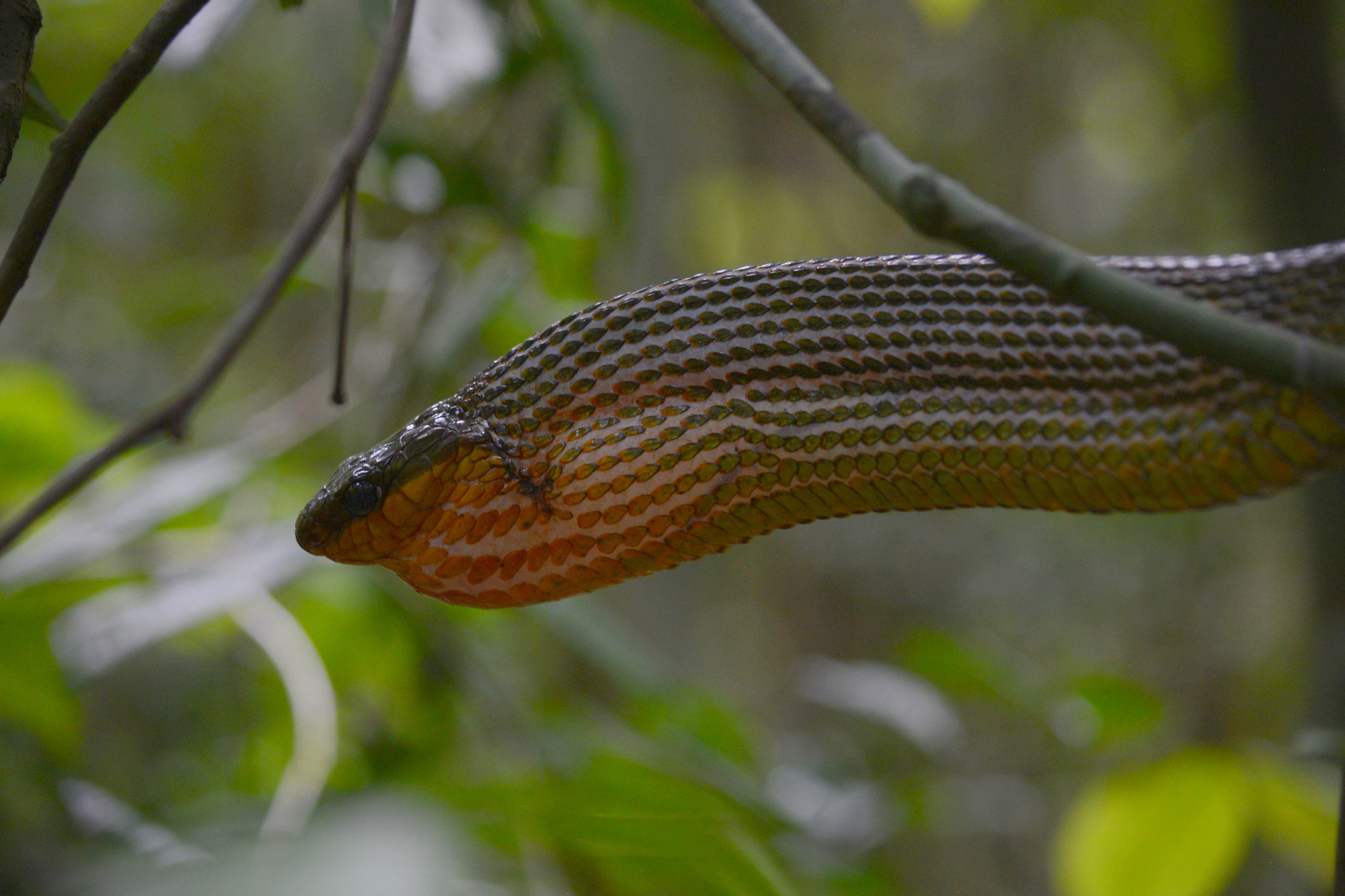
- Spilotes sulphureus in defensive posture at Murici Ecological Station, Brazil

Conservation status
- Least Concern (IUCN 3.1)

Scientific classification
- Kingdom: Animalia
- Phylum: Chordata
- Class: Reptilia
- Order: Squamata
- Suborder: Serpentes
- Family: Colubridae
- Genus: Spilotes
- Species: S. sulphureus

Binomial name
- Spilotes sulphureus (Wagler, 1824)

Synonyms
- Natrix sulphurea Wagler, 1824; Coluber poecilostoma Wied-Neuwied, 1824; Spilotes poecilostoma A.M.C. Duméril, Bibron & A.H.A. Duméril, 1854; Phrynonax sulphureus Boulenger, 1894; Paraphrynonax versicolor Lutz & Mello, 1920; Pseustes sulphureus Wagler, 1824

= Spilotes sulphureus =

Species of snake

Spilotes sulphureus, commonly known as the yellow-bellied hissing snake or Amazon puffing snake, is a species of venomous snake in the family Colubridae. It is widely distributed throughout South America, as well as the Caribbean island of Trinidad.

== Taxonomy ==
Originally placed in the genus Pseustes, it is now considered in the genus Spilotes.

=== Subspecies ===
Two subspecies are recognized as being valid, including the nominotypical subspecies.

- S. s. sulphureus (Wagler, 1824)
- S. s. dieperinkii (Schlegel, 1837)

Nota bene: A trinomial authority in parentheses indicates that the subspecies was original described in a genus other than Spilotes.

== Description ==
S. sulphureus is a large snake, which can grow up to 3 metres (9.8 ft) in total length (including tail). Its venom is bimodal and can directly affect both mammal and reptile prey.

== Diet ==
Adults of S. sulphureus feed on small mammals, birds and other snakes (both venomous and non-venomous), while juveniles feed on lizards, mice and rats.
