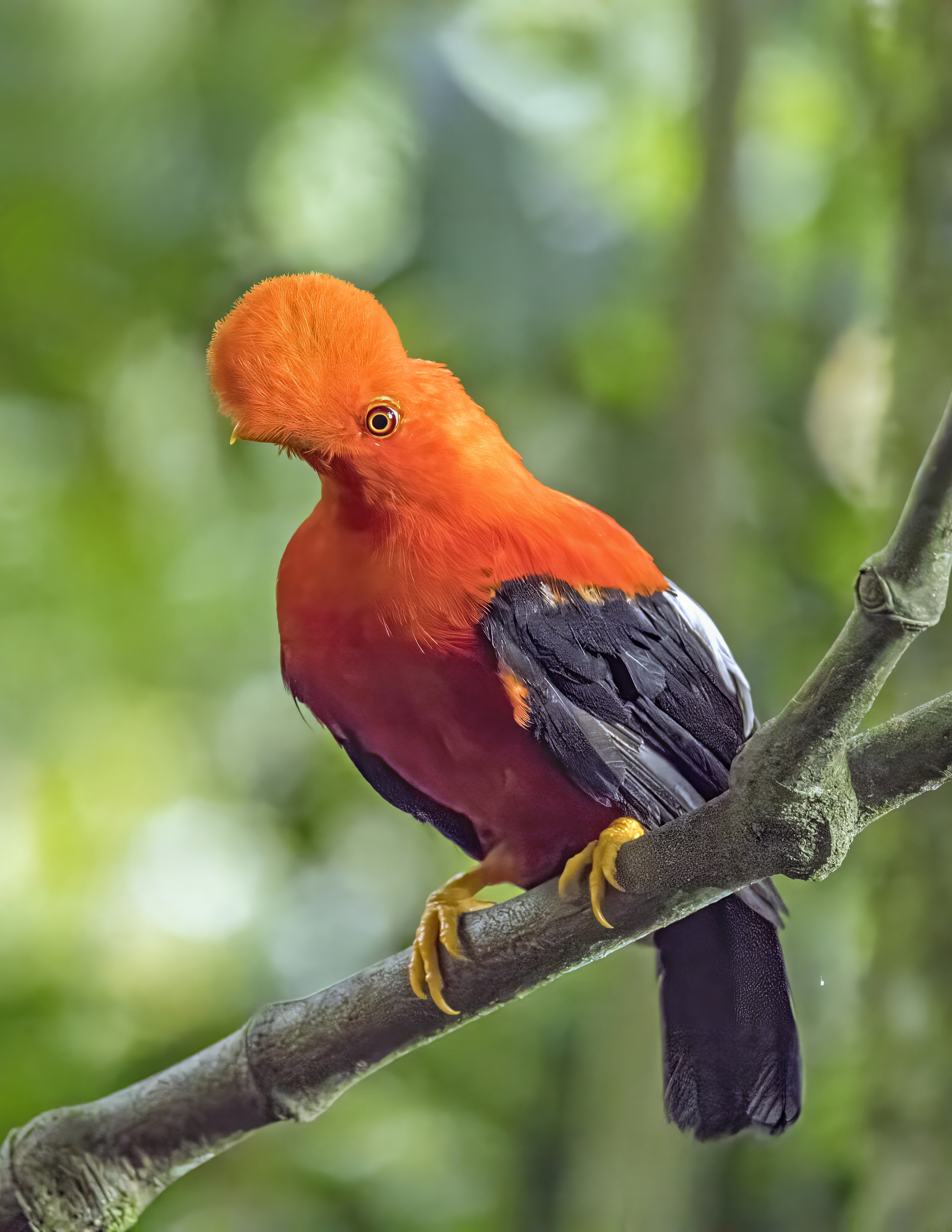
- Male R. p. sanguinolentus, Colombia
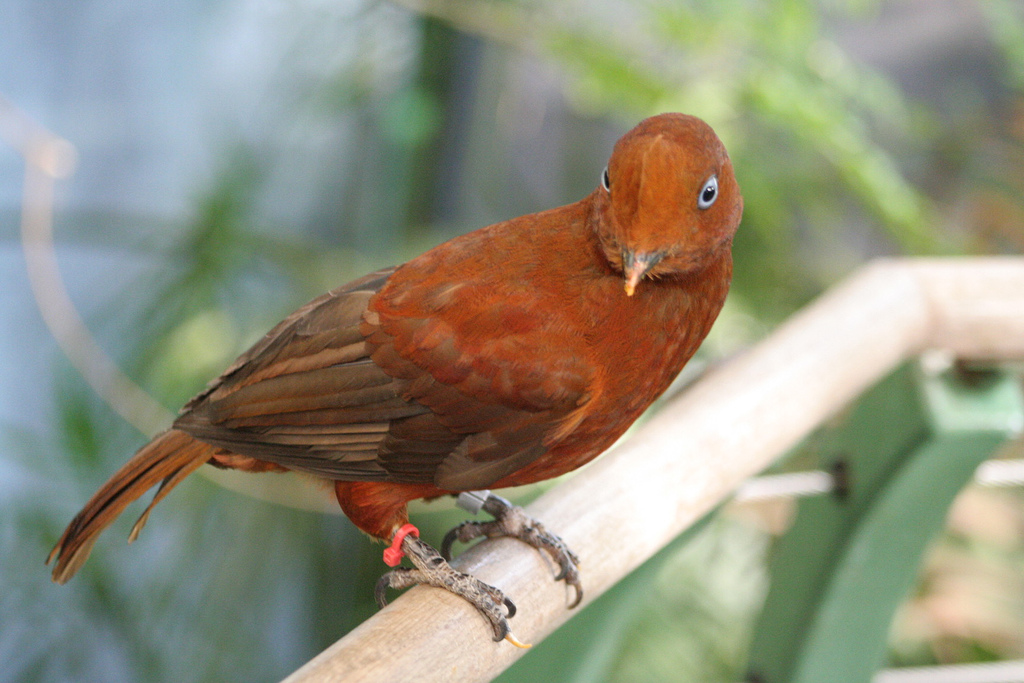
- Female (nominate)

Conservation status
- Least Concern (IUCN 3.1)
- CITES Appendix II

Scientific classification
- Kingdom: Animalia
- Phylum: Chordata
- Class: Aves
- Order: Passeriformes
- Family: Cotingidae
- Genus: Rupicola
- Species: R. peruvianus

Binomial name
- Rupicola peruvianus (Latham, 1790)

Subspecies
- See text

= Andean cock-of-the-rock =

Species of bird

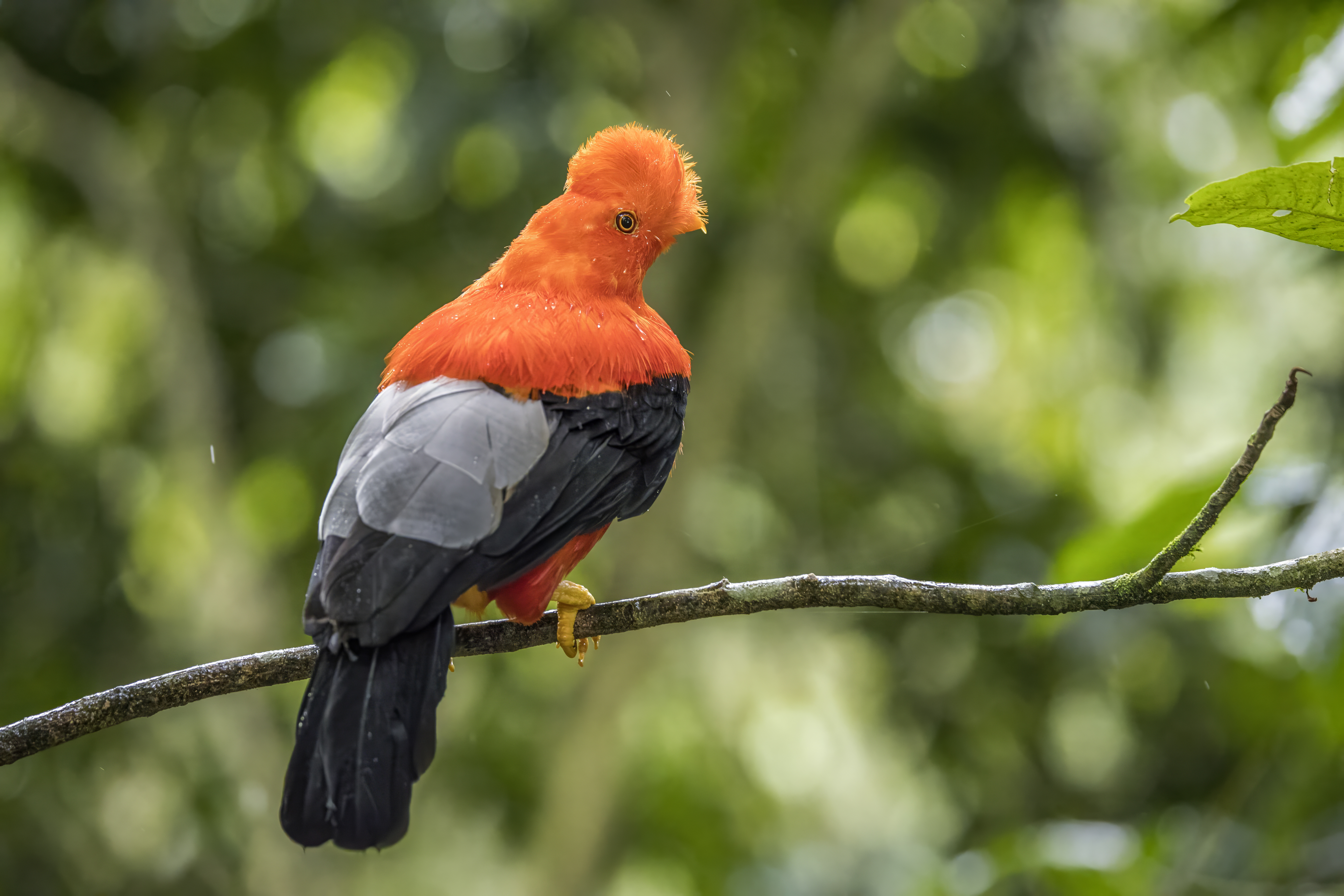
Male R. p. sanguinolentus showing back feathers

The Andean cock-of-the-rock (Rupicola peruvianus), also known as tunki (Quechua), is a large passerine bird of the cotinga family native to Andean cloud forests in South America. It is the national bird of Peru. It has four subspecies and its closest relative is the Guianan cock-of-the-rock.

The Andean cock-of-the-rock exhibits marked sexual dimorphism; the male has a large disk-like crest and scarlet or brilliant orange plumage, while the female is significantly darker and browner. Gatherings of males compete for breeding females with each male displaying his colourful plumage, bobbing and hopping, and making a variety of calls. After mating, the female makes a nest under a rocky overhang, incubates the eggs, and rears the young by herself.

The Andean cock-of-the-rock eats a diet of fruit, supplemented by insects, amphibian, reptile, and smaller mice. It is distributed all across the cloud forest of the Andes, having a range of around 260,000 km^{2} (100,000 sq mi). Even though it is being affected by the destruction of its habitat, the Andean cock-of-the-rock is not classified as threatened.

== Taxonomy and etymology ==
One of two species in the genus Rupicola, the other being the Guianan cock-of-the-rock, the Andean cock-of-the-rock was first described by English ornithologist John Latham in 1790. It is classified in the Cotingidae, a family of largely frugivorous tropical forest suboscine passerines. The generic name is derived from the Latin stems rupes "rock" or "cliff", and cola "inhabiting", and is derived from its habit of nesting in rock walls. Its specific epithet peruvianus "of Peru" is masculine despite the -a ending of the genus name (in Latin, names in -cola were masculine or neuter); peruviana is seen in older works.

Four subspecies are known:

- R. p. peruvianus – (Latham, 1790), nominate subspecies
- R. p. aequatorialis – Taczanowski, 1889
- R. p. sanguinolentus – Gould, 1859
- R. p. saturatus – Cabanis and Heine, 1859

== Description ==
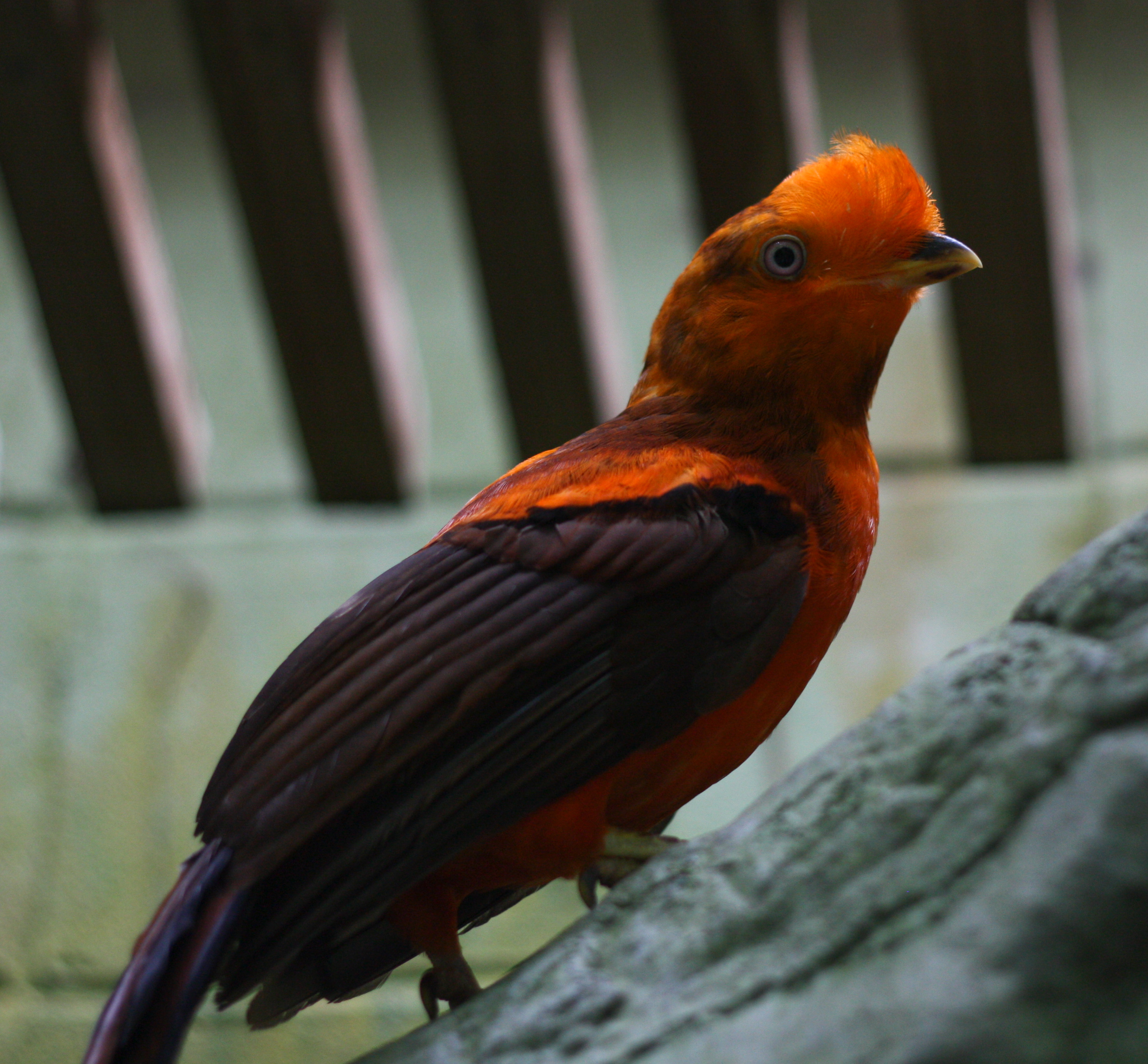
Immature male at the Cincinnati Zoo, US

The Andean cock-of-the-rock is a large passerine, approximately 32 cm (13 in) long and weighing around 265 grams (9.3 oz; 0.584 lb), although males are somewhat larger and the heaviest specimens can reach 300 grams (11 oz; 0.66 lb). The bird is one of many bird species to exhibit marked sexual dimorphism. The male has a large disk-like crest and brilliant scarlet or orange plumage. He has a black tail and wings, and pale greyish scapulars. The female is significantly drabber and browner than the male and has a less prominent crest. The bill is yellowish in the male and dark with a small yellow tip in the female. Depending on sex and subspecies there are significant variations in the color of the iris, ranging from red over orange and yellow to bluish-white in the male, and whitish over reddish to brown in the female. In addition to the display calls described in the breeding section below, foraging birds give a loud querulous "tank?" when disturbed or in flight.

== Distribution and habitat ==
The Andean cock-of-the-rock is distributed in the cloud forests of the Andes. It lives in a large range of about 260,000 km^{2} (100,000 sq mi) across Venezuela, Colombia, Ecuador, Peru, and Bolivia, mostly in ravines and forested streams in montane areas at 500 to 2,400 m (1,600 to 7,900 ft) elevation. It typically stays in the lower and middle forest levels but will range higher in fruiting trees and will sometimes enter and cross clearings. It is generally shy and inconspicuous, often seen only briefly after being flushed out or while swiftly flying down a valley.

R. p. aequatorialis is the most widespread subspecies, ranging across the Andes of East Colombia to West Venezuela, East Ecuador, and East Peru. The nominate subspecies, R. p. peruvianus has a small range stretching only through the Andes of Central Peru. R. p. sanguinolentus ranges throughout the Andes in West Colombia to Northwest Ecuador. The subspecies R. p. saturatus has a range across Southeast Peru and West Bolivia.

== Behavior ==
=== Food and feeding ===
The diet consists mainly of fruit and insects, although lizards and frogs have been recorded. The fruits consumed are often from the plant families Lauraceae, Annonaceae, and Rubiaceae, although a few other plant families have also been reported in their diet. They are one of many species recorded following army ants. They occasionally will eat high-protein fruits, but they prefer to eat the other fruits on their menu.

=== Breeding ===
Male cocks-of-the-rock are polygamous, and have nothing to do with nesting once mating is done. The male's energy instead is devoted to very elaborate display rituals that show off his magnificent plumage. These displays take place in communal leks, where males gather to challenge rivals and beckon the females. The males are easily disturbed, so their behavior is not easy to see. One study reported that the display activity is dependent on light intensity, with the morning display period occurring during the same light intensity level as the afternoon period.

At the lek, males have been observed to break up into pairs, performing "confrontation displays". This consists of facing each other while bowing, jumping, and flapping their wings, sometimes even snapping their bills, and at the same time giving off various squawking and grunting calls. When the female approaches, she becomes even more intense. The display turns into a cacophony of bright color and a frenzied activity filling the air with very strange sounds.

Breeding takes place at different times of the year in different areas. In Colombia, breeding normally happens from February until July. In Ecuador, the breeding interval spans from July until February.

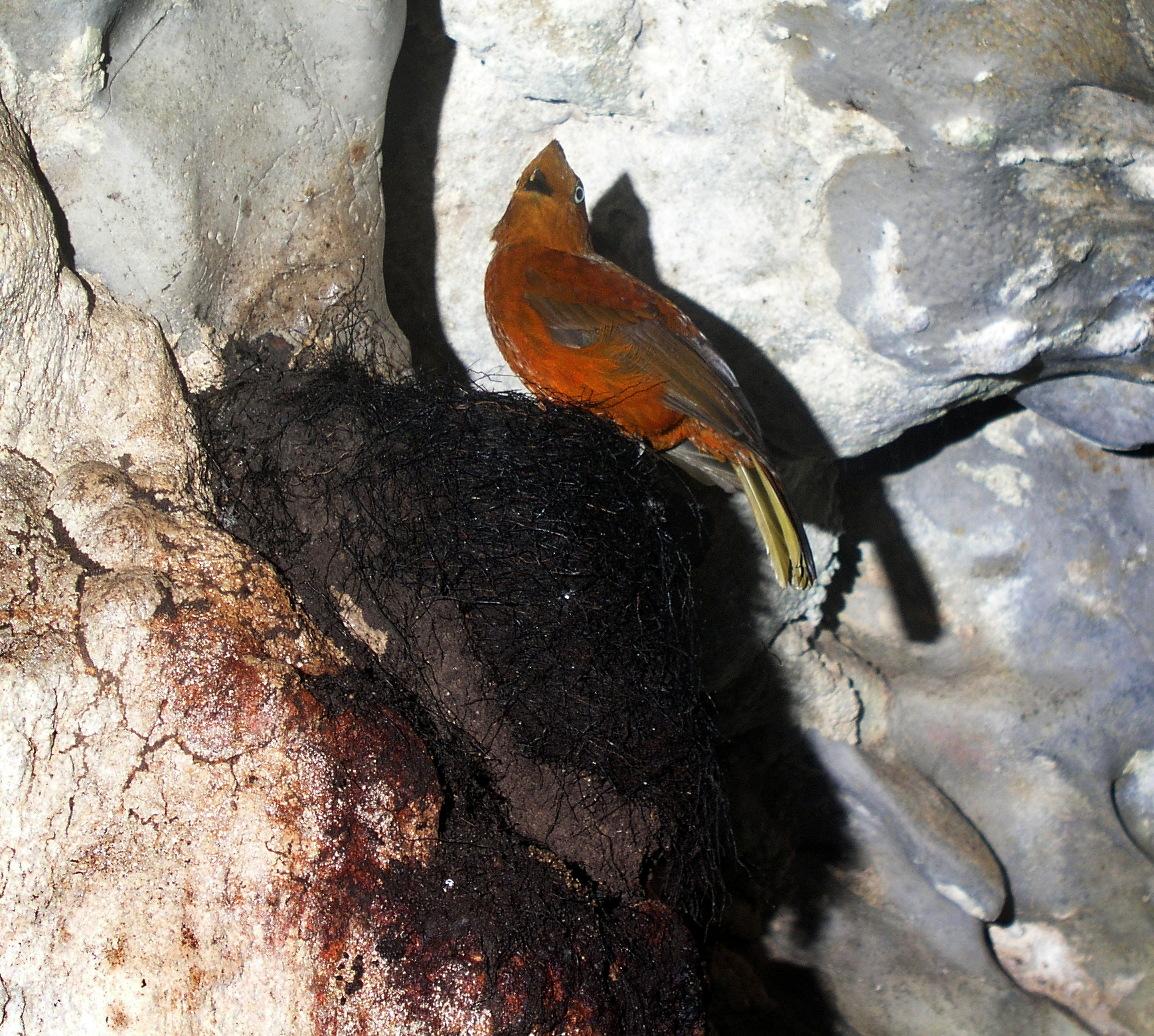
A female cock-of-the-rock in its nest

=== Nesting ===
The nests, built entirely by the female, are mud-plastered to cave entrances or rocky outcrops in forest ravines. The nests are often constructed from the saliva of the females mixed in with vegetable matter and mud. The nest is shaped like a concave cup. The female typically lays two white eggs. The female incubates these eggs for about 25 to 28 days.

=== Impact on environment ===
Andean cocks-of-the-rock influence the environment around them. It was found that a white-capped dipper renovated an abandoned cock-of-the-rock nest to lay its eggs in. Cocks-of-the-rock also change the surrounding flora through seed dispersal. Seeds that the birds ingest often are found deposited around lek and nesting sites. This favors the germination and growth of those seeds. The diversity of these types of seeds has been found to be increased at lek and nests and decreased throughout the surrounding forest.

=== Predators ===
Andean cocks-of-the-rock face slightly larger predators than smaller songbirds. Predators are attracted to leks by the conspicuous behavior of the displaying males. The animals reported to prey on adult cocks-of-the-rock include hawk-eagles, forest-falcons, hawks, owls, jaguars, mountain lions, ocelots, and the boa constrictor.

== Relationship with humans ==
The Andean cock-of-the-rock is the national bird of Peru. Juveniles and adults have occasionally been pets.

=== Conservation ===
The worldwide population size and trends in population numbers have not been determined, but it is believed that the Andean cock-of-the-rock is not threatened. The species is evaluated as Least Concern on the IUCN Red List of Threatened Species despite habitat destruction. It is patchily distributed, but its range is large enough to sustain it at a Least Concern status.
