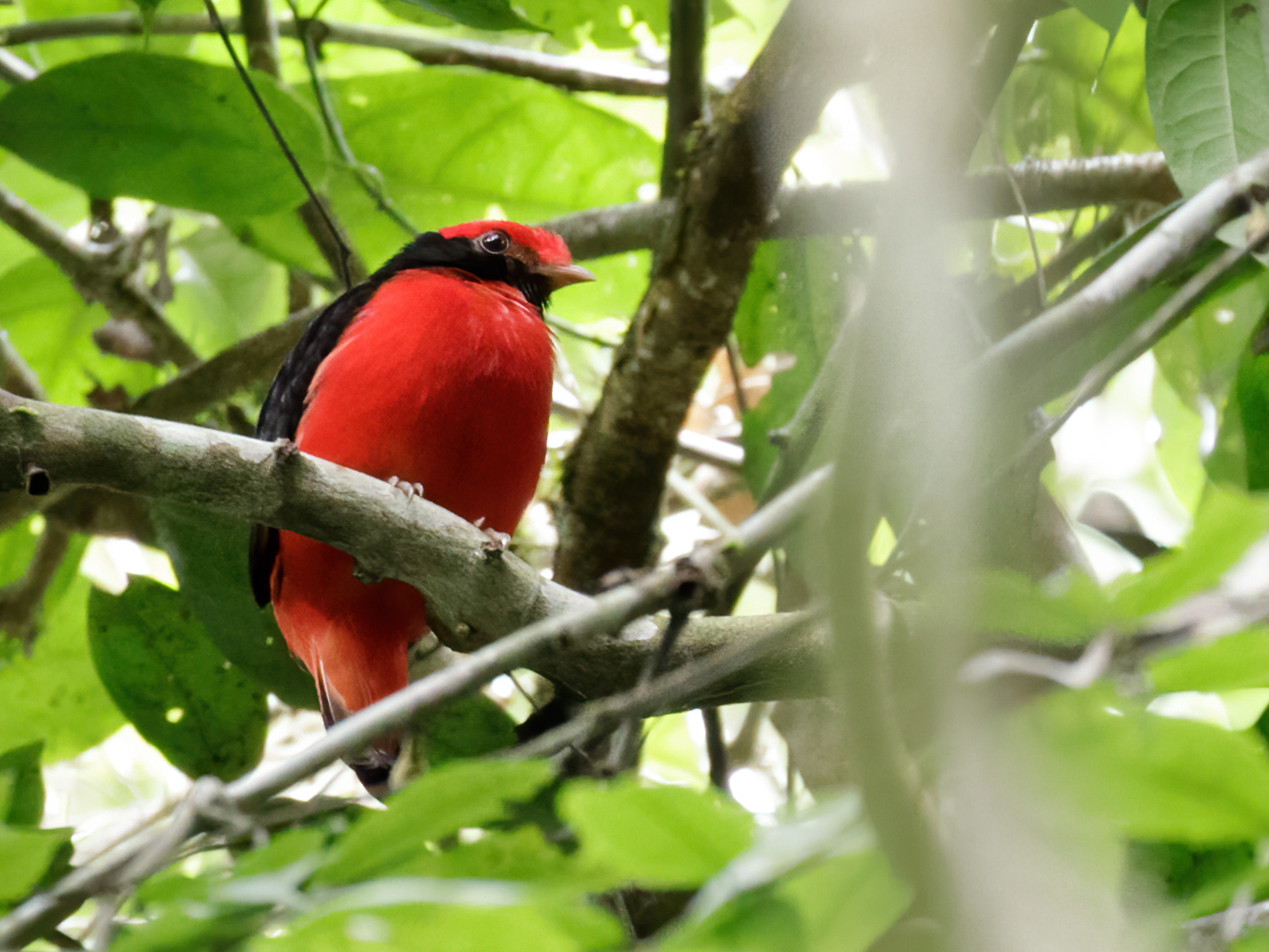
- Male
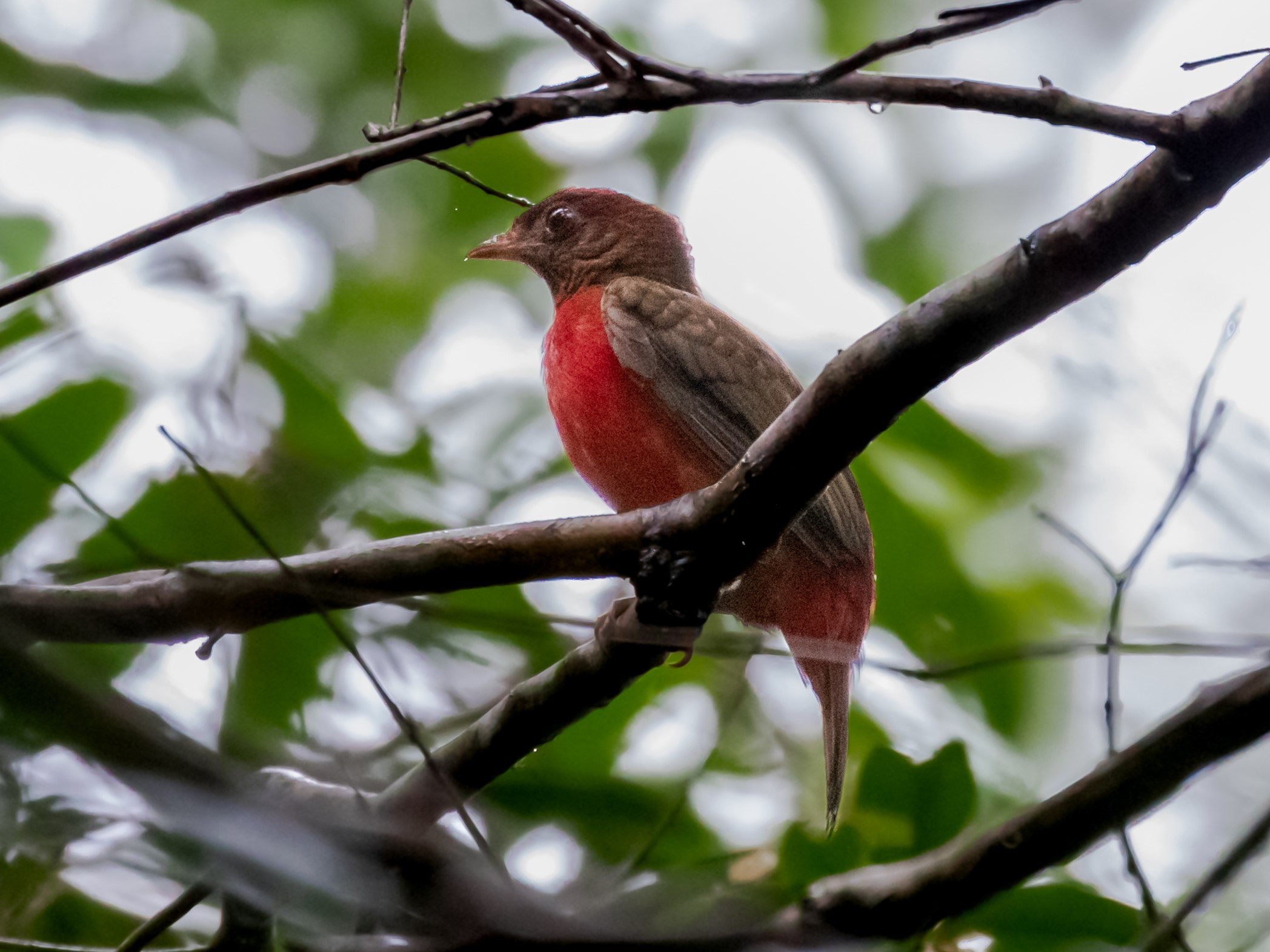
- Female

Conservation status
- Least Concern (IUCN 3.1)

Scientific classification
- Kingdom: Animalia
- Phylum: Chordata
- Class: Aves
- Order: Passeriformes
- Family: Cotingidae
- Genus: Phoenicircus
- Species: P. nigricollis

Binomial name
- Phoenicircus nigricollis Swainson, 1832

= Black-necked red cotinga =

Species of bird

The black-necked red cotinga (Phoenicircus nigricollis) is a species of bird in the family Cotingidae, the cotingas. It is found in Brazil, Colombia, Ecuador, Peru, and Venezuela.

== Taxonomy and systematics ==
The black-necked red cotinga shares genus Phoenicircus with the Guianan red cotinga (P. carnifex) and the two form a superspecies. Both are monotypic.

== Description ==
The black-necked red cotinga is 22 to 24 cm (8.7 to 9.4 in) long and weighs about 93 g (3.3 oz). The sexes have different plumage. Adults have distinctive forehead feathers that project forward, partially concealing the nostrils, and prominent bristles around the base of the bill. Adult males have a red to rosy red crown on an otherwise glossy blackish head and neck. Their back is also glossy blackish and their rump and uppertail coverts red to rosy red. Their wings are glossy blackish. Their tail is red to rosy red with a black bar across the end. Their underparts are red to rosy red. Females are larger than males. They have a dull reddish crown and ear coverts on an otherwise olive face; their upperparts and wings are also olive. Their tail is dull reddish. Their underparts are red. Both sexes have a dark brown iris, a yellow-ochre bill, and pinkish red legs and feet. Immature males resemble adult females with deeper red underparts.

== Distribution and habitat ==
The black-necked red cotinga is a bird of the western and central Amazon Basin. It is found from the southeastern third of Colombia south through eastern Ecuador into northeastern Peru as far as eastern San Martín and western Loreto departments. Its range continues east very slightly into extreme southern Venezuela and across western and central Brazil to western Pará. Its range slightly overlaps that of the Guianan red cotinga in the vicinity of the lower Tapajós River.

The black-necked red cotinga inhabits humid terra firme forest. In elevation it reaches 350 m (1,100 ft) in Colombia, 400 m (1,300 ft) in Ecuador, 200 m (700 ft) in Venezuela, and 600 m (2,000 ft) in Brazil.

== Behavior ==
=== Movement ===
The black-necked red cotinga is believed to be a year-round resident.

=== Feeding ===
The black-necked red cotinga feeds almost entirely on fruit, though details are lacking.

=== Breeding ===
Male black-necked red cotingas display to females at a lek, typically 6 and 10 m (20 and 35 ft) above the ground. They make "twisting display flights" between perches. While perched they bob their heads, fluff out their rump feathers, and call. Nothing else is known about the species' breeding biology.

=== Vocalization ===
Male black-necked red cotingas give "a loud whea, often preceded by [a] soft wur". During the display flight they also make the whea "immediately preceded by whistling wing noise". The call has also been described as "an explosive skeéyh!, sometimes in series". Both sexes also make the call while foraging.

== Status ==
The IUCN has assessed the black-necked red cotinga as being of Least Concern. It has a very large range; its population size is not known and is believed to be decreasing. No immediate threats have been identified. It is considered uncommon in Colombia, "rare and local" in Ecuador, "uncommon and local" in Peru, and uncommon in Brazil. As of 2003 it was known from only two locations in Venezuela. It occurs in a few protected areas.
