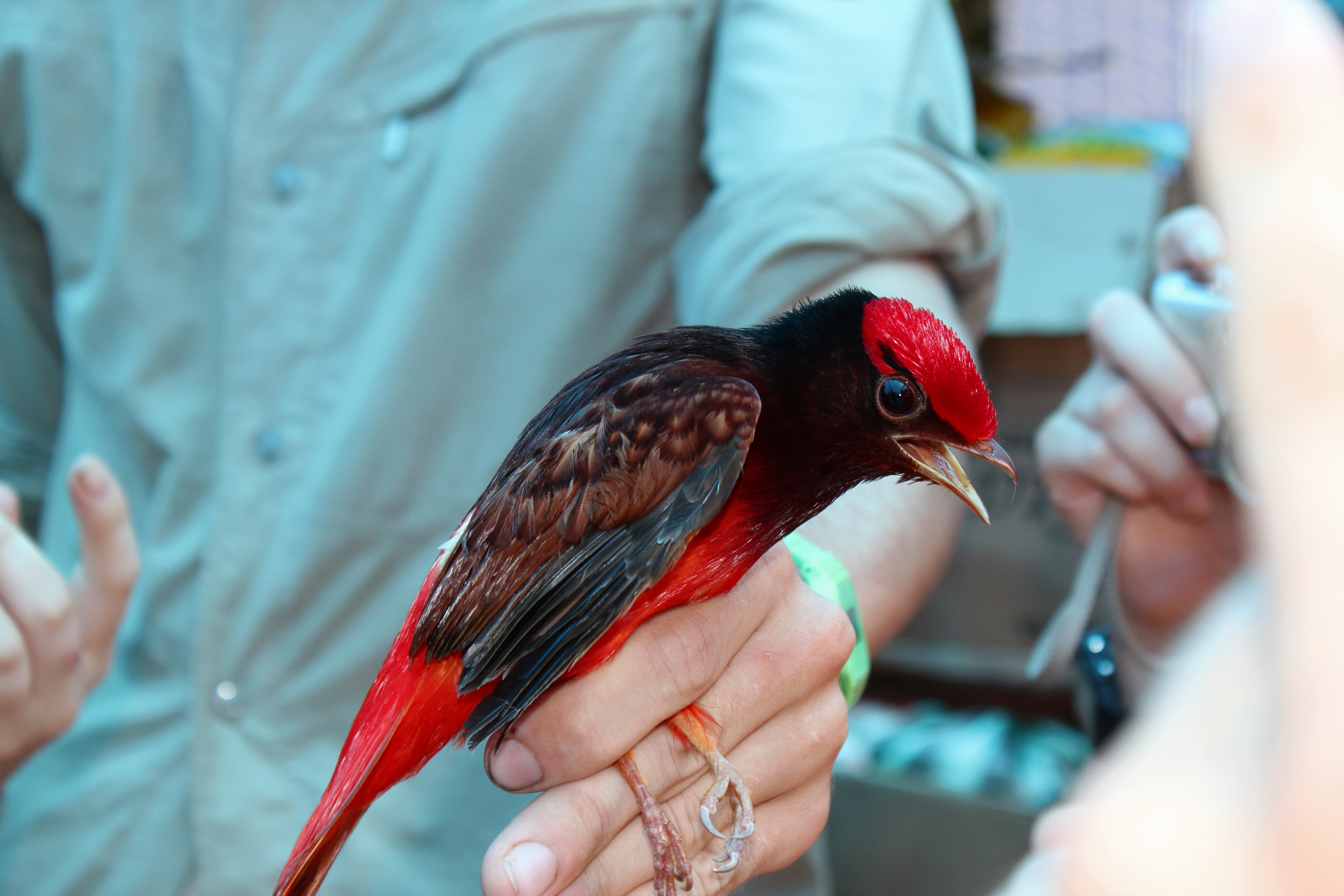

Conservation status
- Least Concern (IUCN 3.1)

Scientific classification
- Kingdom: Animalia
- Phylum: Chordata
- Class: Aves
- Order: Passeriformes
- Family: Cotingidae
- Genus: Phoenicircus
- Species: P. carnifex

Binomial name
- Phoenicircus carnifex (Linnaeus, 1758)

Synonyms
- Lanius carnifex Linnaeus, 1758; Ampelis carnifex Linnaeus, 1766

= Guianan red cotinga =

Species of bird

The Guianan red cotinga (Phoenicircus carnifex) is a species of bird in the family Cotingidae, the cotingas. It is found in Brazil, French Guiana, Guyana, Suriname, and Venezuela.

== Taxonomy and systematics ==
In 1743 the English naturalist George Edwards included an illustration and a description of the Guianan red cotinga in the first volume of his A Natural History of Uncommon Birds. He used the English name "The Red Bird from Surinam". Edwards based his hand-colored etching on a specimen in the collection of the Duke of Richmond. When in 1758 the Swedish naturalist Carl Linnaeus updated his Systema Naturae for the tenth edition, he placed the Guianan red cotinga with the shrikes in the genus Lanius. Linnaeus included a brief description, coined the binomial name Lanius carnifex and cited Edwards' work. The Guianan red cotinga is now placed in the genus Phoenicircus that was introduced in 1832 by the English naturalist William Swainson. The genus name combines the Ancient Greek phoinikeos meaning "crimson" or "dark red" with kerkos meaning "tail". The specific epithet carnifex is Latin meaning "executioner" or "murderer".

The Guianan red cotinga shares genus Phoenicircus with the black-necked red cotinga (P. nigricollis) and the two form a superspecies. Both are monotypic.

== Description ==
The Guianan red cotinga is 22 to 24 cm (8.7 to 9.4 in) long and weighs about 82 to 95 g (2.9 to 3.4 oz). The sexes have different plumage. Adults have distinctive forehead feathers that project forward, partially concealing the nostrils, and prominent bristles around the base of the bill. Adult males have a glossy bright red crown on an otherwise blackish to maroon-brown head. Their upperparts are also blackish to maroon-brown. Their wings are mostly rufescent brown with duskier primaries. Their tail is bright red with a dark brownish bar across the end. Their underparts are bright red. Females are larger than males. They have a dull reddish crown and ear coverts on an otherwise olive face; their upperparts and wings are also olive. Their tail is dull reddish. Their underparts are rosy red. Both sexes have a red-brown iris, a horn-colored to brownish orange bill, and pinkish to pale brownish orange legs and feet. Immature males resemble adult females with deeper red underparts.

== Distribution and habitat ==
The Guianan red cotinga is found from eastern Bolívar state in far eastern Venezuela east through the Guianas and south in northern Brazil. In Brazil the western edge of its range is eastern Roraima and eastern Amazonas, its eastern edge the Atlantic in northwestern Maranhão, and its southern edge in the lower Tapajós River drainage. The western part of its range slightly overlaps that of the black-necked red cotinga. It inhabits humid to wet lowland forest. In elevation it reaches 250 m (800 ft) in Venezuela and 600 m (2,000 ft) in Brazil.

== Behavior ==
=== Movement ===
The Guianan red cotinga is believed to be a year-round resident.

=== Feeding ===
The Guianan red cotinga appears to feed only on fruit; species in at least eight botanical families have been recorded as its source. It plucks the fruits while perched or with a short sally.

=== Breeding ===
Male Guianan red cotingas display to females at a lek. They swoop between perches that are typically between about 8 and 12 m (25 and 40 ft) above the ground. While perched they lean forward, droop their wings and tail, and call noisily. In Suriname the display period spans at least December to May. One nest was a shallow cup made from mud and twigs lined with rootlets and plant fibers. It was built in a crevice in a tree about 2.7 m (9 ft) above the ground. When discovered in late January it held two nestlings.

=== Vocalization ===
The dawn call of the Guianan red cotinga is "pee-chew-eet". During the lek display its wings make a mechanical whirring sound. When alarmed it makes a "wheep".

== Status ==
The IUCN has assessed the Guianan red cotinga as being of Least Concern. It has a large range; its population size is not known and is believed to be decreasing. No immediate threats have been identified. It is considered rare and very local in Venezuela and uncommon in Brazil. It is known in two preserves in Venezuela and is "almost certainly present in several other protected areas".
