= Phrynonax shropshirei =

Conservation status
- Least Concern (IUCN 3.1)

Scientific classification
- Kingdom: Animalia
- Phylum: Chordata
- Class: Reptilia
- Order: Squamata
- Suborder: Serpentes
- Family: Colubridae
- Genus: Phrynonax
- Species: P. shropshirei

Binomial name
- Phrynonax shropshirei Barbour & Amaral, 1924

Species of snake

Phrynonax shropshirei, Shropshire's puffing snake, is a species of snake of the family Colubridae.

The snake is found in Costa Rica, Panama, Colombia, Venezuela, and Ecuador.
