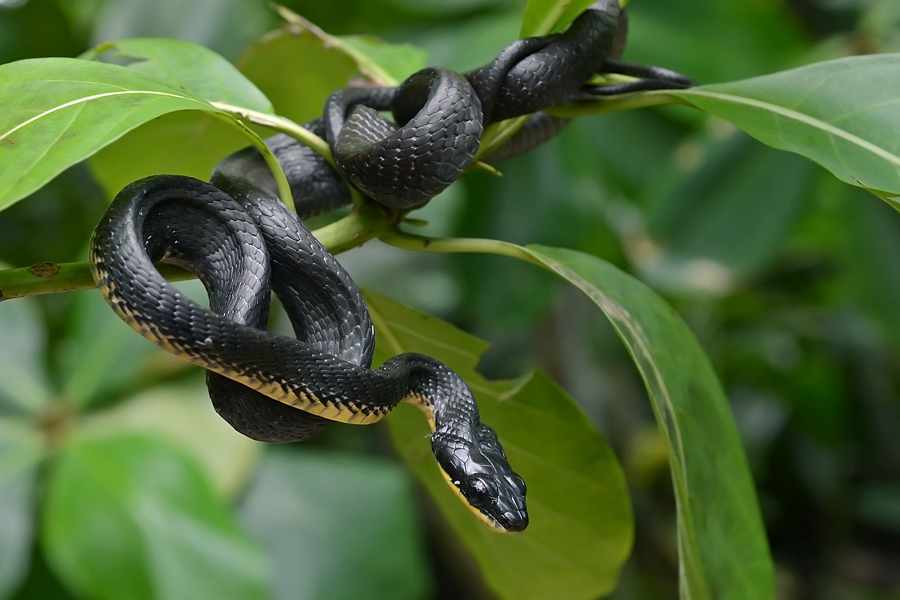
- Phrynonax poecilonotus

Scientific classification
- Kingdom: Animalia
- Phylum: Chordata
- Class: Reptilia
- Order: Squamata
- Suborder: Serpentes
- Family: Colubridae
- Subfamily: Colubrinae
- Genus: Phrynonax; Cope, 1862

Synonyms
- Ahaetulla, Chironius, Herpetodryas, Natrix, Pseustes, Spilotes, Synchalinus, Tropidodipsas

= Phrynonax =

Genus of snakes

Phrynonax is a genus of snakes in the family Colubridae. The genus is endemic to the New World

== Geographic range ==
Species in the genus Phrynonax are found in South America, Central America, and Mexico.

== Species ==
Three species are recognized as being valid.

- Phrynonax poecilonotus (Günther, 1858) - puffing snake
- Phrynonax sexcarinatus (Wagler, 1824) - northeastern puffing snake
- Phrynonax shropshirei Barbour & Amaral, 1924 - Shropshire's puffing snake

Nota bene: A binomial authority in parentheses indicates that the species was originally described in a genus other than Phrynonax.

== Etymology ==
The specific name, shropshirei, is in honor of James B. Shropshire, "Chief Sanitary Inspector, U.S. Army, Canal Zone", who collected the paratype.
