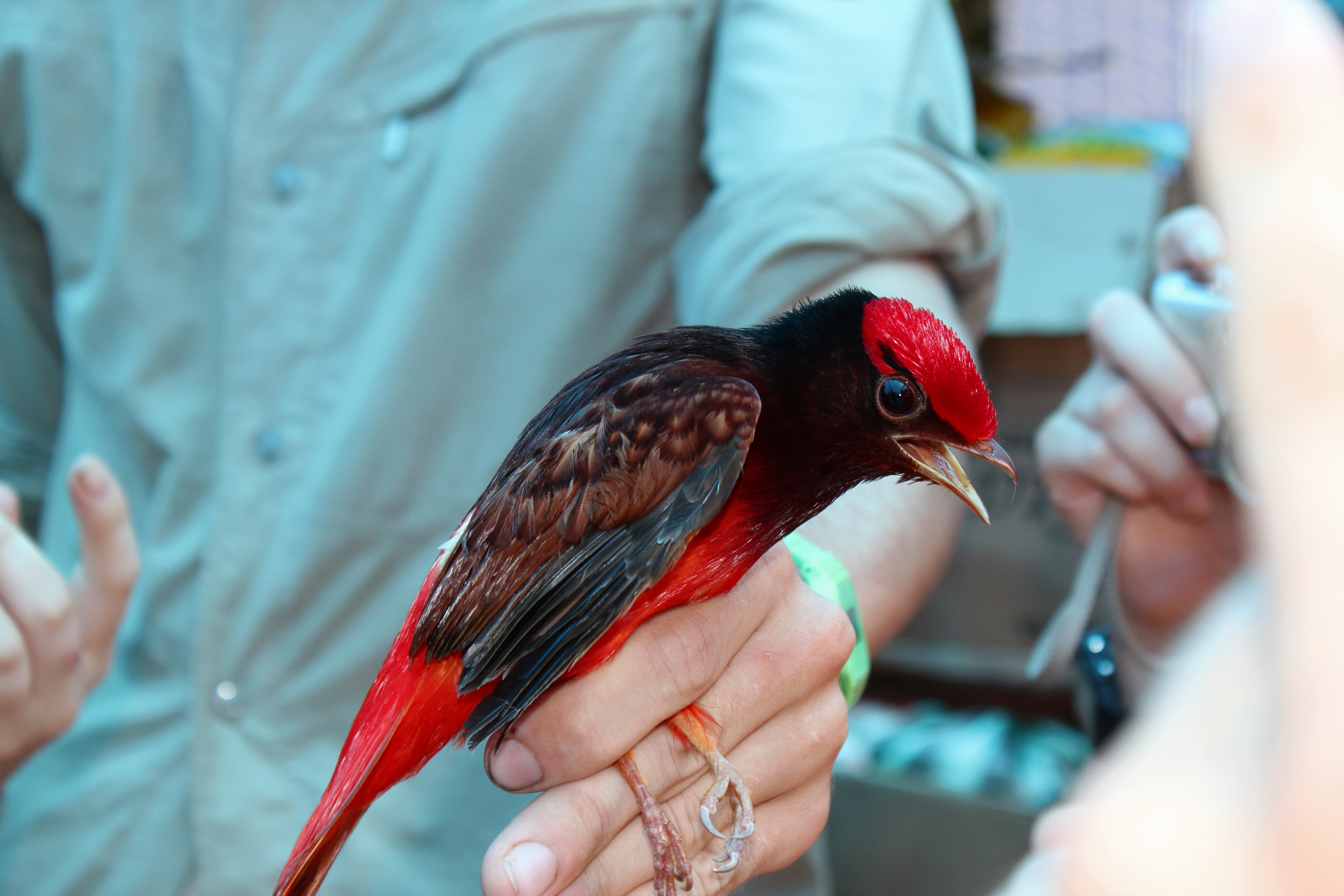
- Guianan red cotinga (Phoenicircus carnifex)

Scientific classification
- Kingdom: Animalia
- Phylum: Chordata
- Class: Aves
- Order: Passeriformes
- Family: Cotingidae
- Genus: Phoenicircus; Swainson, 1832

Type species
- Lanius carnifex (Guianan red cotinga) Linnaeus, 1758

= Phoenicircus =

Genus of birds

Phoenicircus is a genus of birds in the family Cotingidae. They have a bright red breast, crown, tail, and rump with the Guianan species having dark brown wings and the black-necked species having black wings. They are frugivores, eating primarily berries and drupes.

== Taxonomy ==
The genus Phoenicircus was introduced in 1832 by the English naturalist William Swainson. The type species was designated as the Guianan red cotinga by George Robert Gray in 1840. The name combines the Ancient Greek phoinikeos meaning "crimson" or "dark red" with kerkos meaning "tail".

The genus contains the following two species:

Image	Scientific name	Common name	Distribution
	Phoenicircus carnifex	Guianan red cotinga	Guianas and lower Amazon river valley
	Phoenicircus nigricollis	Black-necked red cotinga	Amazonia
