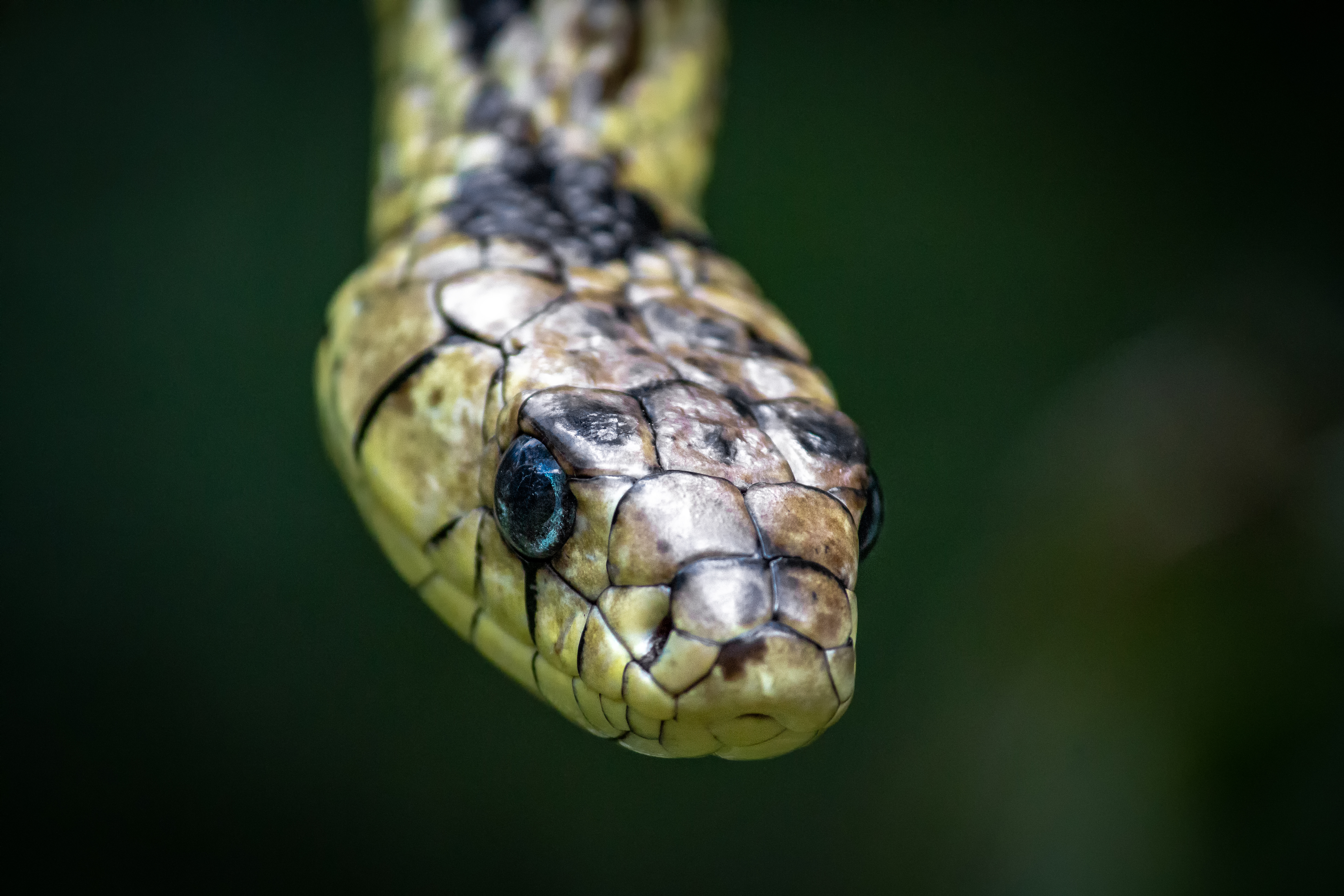
- Caninana at Alto Ribeira Tourist State Park, Brazil

Conservation status
- Least Concern (IUCN 3.1)

Scientific classification
- Kingdom: Animalia
- Phylum: Chordata
- Class: Reptilia
- Order: Squamata
- Suborder: Serpentes
- Family: Colubridae
- Genus: Spilotes
- Species: S. pullatus

Binomial name
- Spilotes pullatus (Linnaeus, 1758)

Synonyms
- Coluber pullatus Linnaeus, 1758; Tyria pullata — Fitzinger, 1826; Spilotes pullatus — Wagler, 1830

= Spilotes pullatus =

Species of snake

Spilotes pullatus, commonly known as the chicken snake, tropical chicken snake, yellow rat snake, or tiger rat snake is a species of large nonvenomous colubrid snake endemic to the Neotropics.

== Taxonomy ==
=== Subspecies ===
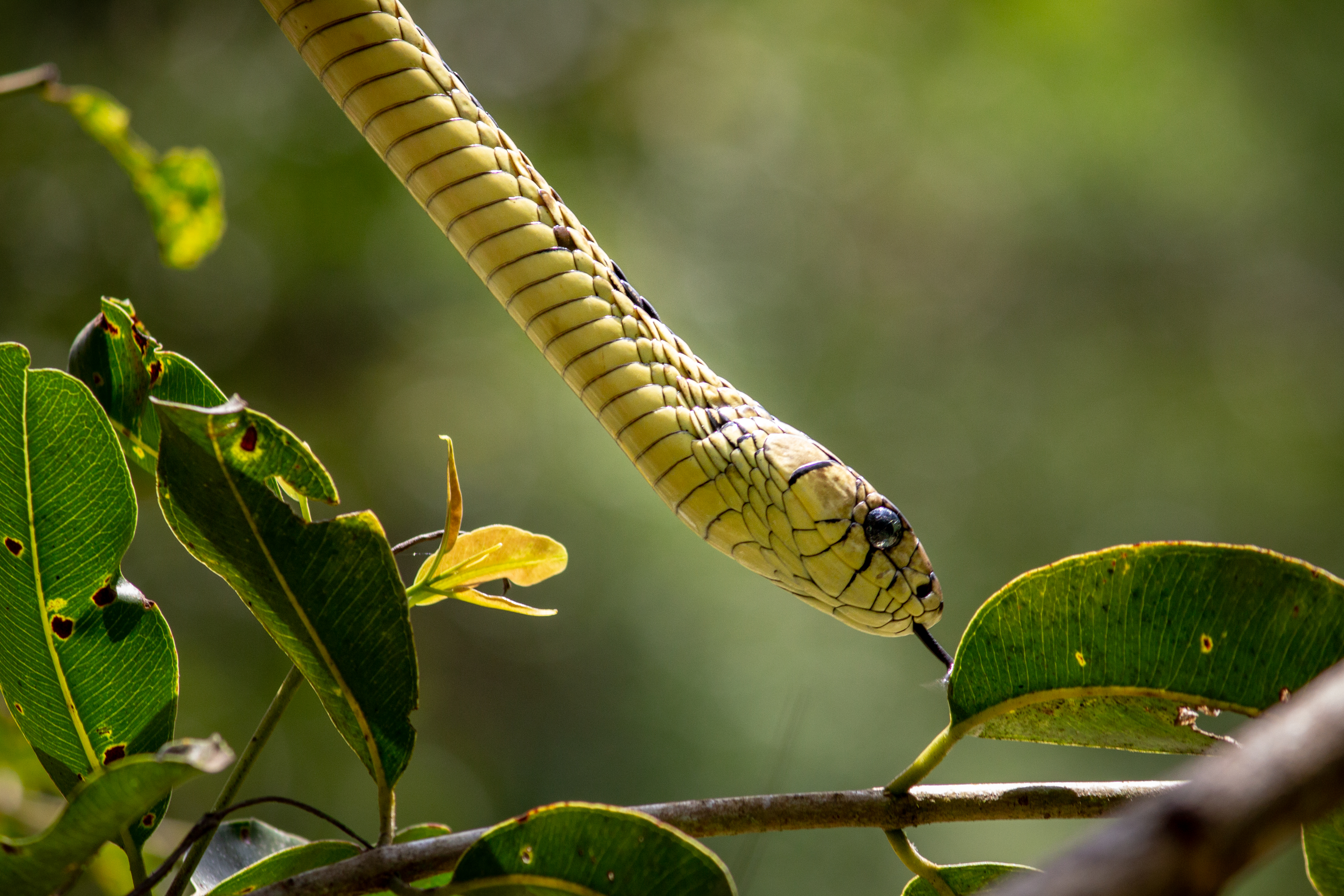
Spilotes pullatus

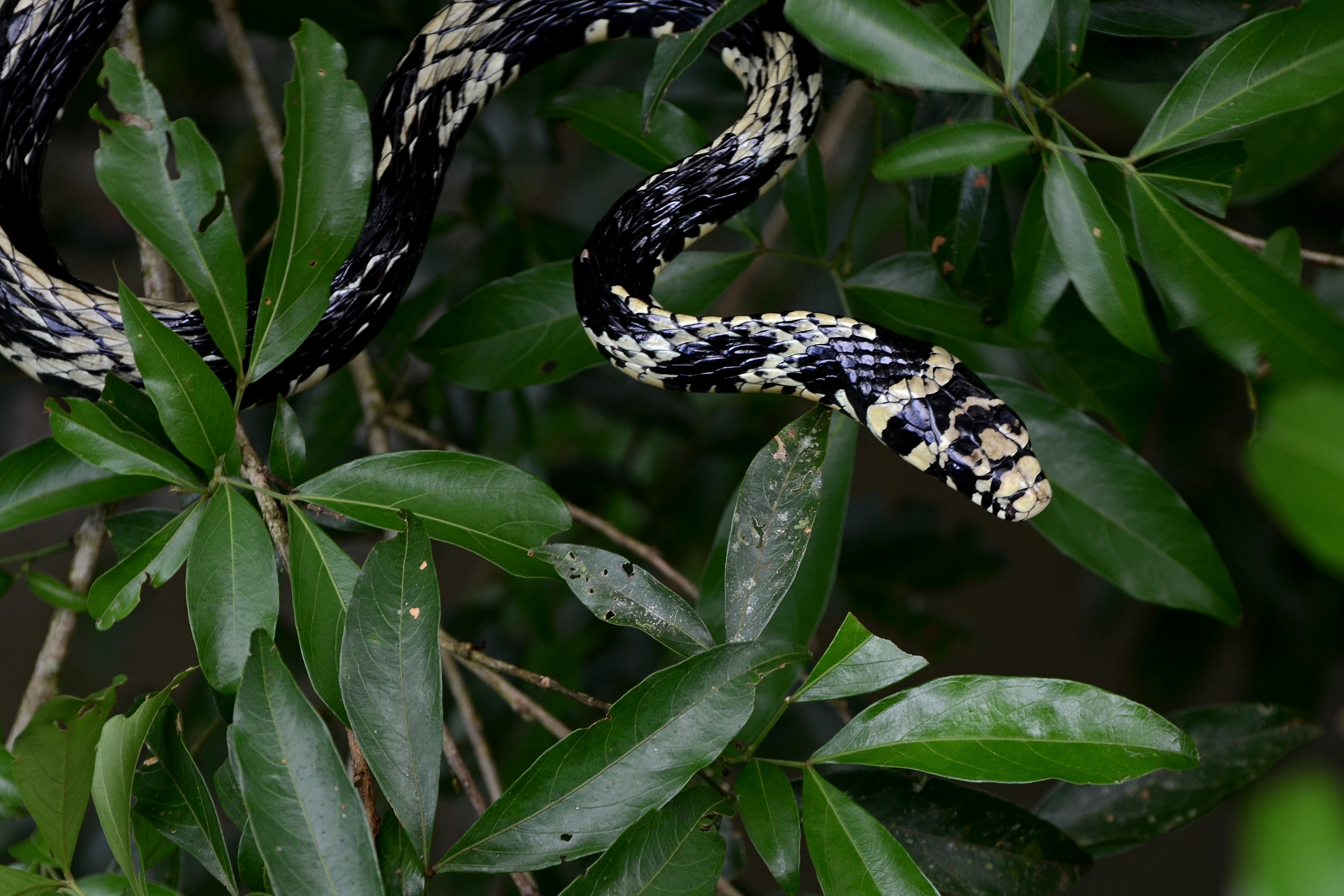
S. pullatus at the La Selva Biological Station in Costa Rica

Including the nominotypical subspecies, the following five subspecies are recognized:

- S. p. pullatus (Linnaeus, 1758)
- S. p. anomalepis Bocourt, 1888
- S. p. argusiformis Amaral, 1929
- S. p. maculatus Amaral, 1929
- S. p. mexicanus (Laurenti, 1768)

== Geographic range ==
It is found in southern Mexico, Central America, northern and central South America, and Trinidad and Tobago in the Caribbean.

== Description ==
Adults may attain a maximum total length of 2.7 m (8.9 ft), with the average length ranging from 1.5 to 2 m (4.9 to 6.6 ft).

Dorsally, S. pullatus is black with yellow spots which may form crossbands. The tip of the snout is yellow. The head shields may be mostly yellow, or mostly black, or crossbanded with a combination of yellow and black, but the sutures between the shields are always black. Ventrally, it is yellow with irregular black crossbands.

The body is relatively slender and somewhat laterally compressed. The head is distinct from the neck. The eye is moderate in size with a round pupil. There are no suboculars, and the loreal is either very small or absent. There are 6 or 7 upper labials, the 3rd and 4th entering the eye, the last two very large. The dorsal scales are pointed and overlapping.

The dorsal scales are arranged in 16 (or 14) rows at midbody. Ventrals 198-232; anal plate entire; subcaudals 90-120, divided.

== Habitat ==
It tends to inhabit forested areas, and is often found near water.

== Behavior ==
It is mainly arboreal, but also terrestrial. It is diurnal and an active forager.

== Diet ==
It feeds on a wide variety of prey, including small mammals (such as rodents and bats), birds, lizards, other reptiles, amphibians, and eggs.
