= Phrynonax sexcarinatus =

Scientific classification
- Kingdom: Animalia
- Phylum: Chordata
- Class: Reptilia
- Order: Squamata
- Suborder: Serpentes
- Family: Colubridae
- Genus: Phrynonax
- Species: P. sexcarinatus

Binomial name
- Phrynonax sexcarinatus (Wagler, 1824)

Species of snake

Phrynonax sexcarinatus, the northeastern puffing snake, is a species of snake of the family Colubridae.

The snake is found in Brazil, Venezuela, and Ecuador.
