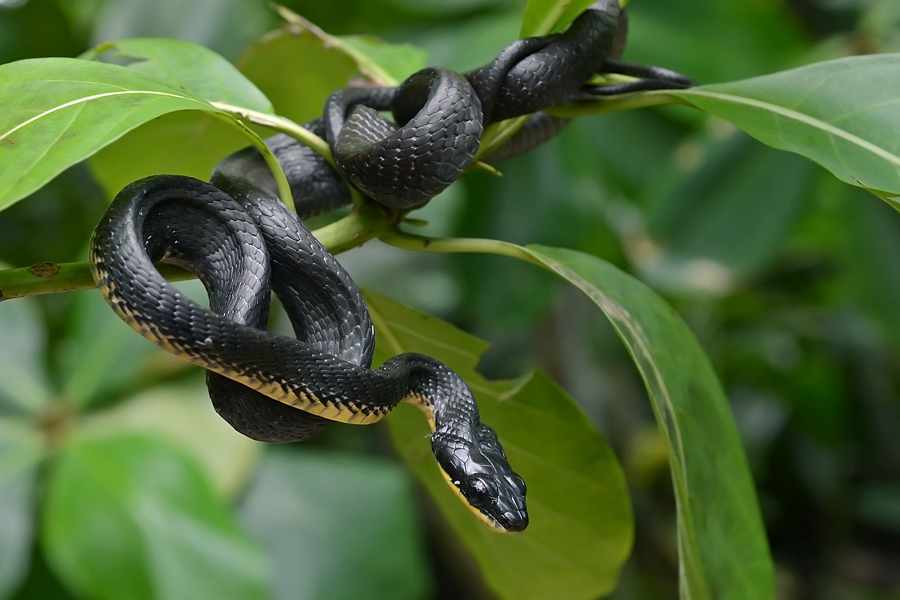

Conservation status
- Least Concern (IUCN 3.1)

Scientific classification
- Kingdom: Animalia
- Phylum: Chordata
- Class: Reptilia
- Order: Squamata
- Suborder: Serpentes
- Family: Colubridae
- Genus: Phrynonax
- Species: P. poecilonotus

Binomial name
- Phrynonax poecilonotus (Günther, 1858)

Synonyms
- Spilotes poecilonotus Günther, 1858; Phrynonax poecilonotus — Boulenger, 1894; Pseustes poecilonotus — Brongersma, 1937; Phrynonax poecilonotus — Jadin et al., 2013

= Phrynonax poecilonotus =

Species of snake

Phrynonax poecilonotus is a species of nonvenomous snake in the family Colubridae. The species is endemic to the New World.

== Common names ==
P. poecilonotus is commonly known in Trinidad and Tobago as dos cocorite, in Brazil as papa-ovo, and in English as the puffing snake or the bird snake.

== Geographic range ==
P. poecilonotus is found from Mexico through Central America to northern and central South America and Trinidad and Tobago.

== Diet ==
P. poecilonotus apparently eats any terrestrial vertebrate small enough to handle and is well known as a predator of bird eggs (hence some of the common names). In captivity, they are known to enjoy scrambled eggs.

== Description ==
P. poecilonotus is one of the most variable snakes in the world. For about the first year of their life, they look very dull in color, and look all the same upon hatching. During the first four years, the snake's appearance will change rapidly, from slate grey and yellow, to slate and orange, etc. Past the first four years of life, changes will be very slow, but they will still change in appearance. The snakes can be combinations of black with red, orange, yellow, and/or lavender, or slate and red, yellow, orange, and/or lavender. However, when handled, their behavior is similar, and they will readily bite.
